= Mark Cawthra =

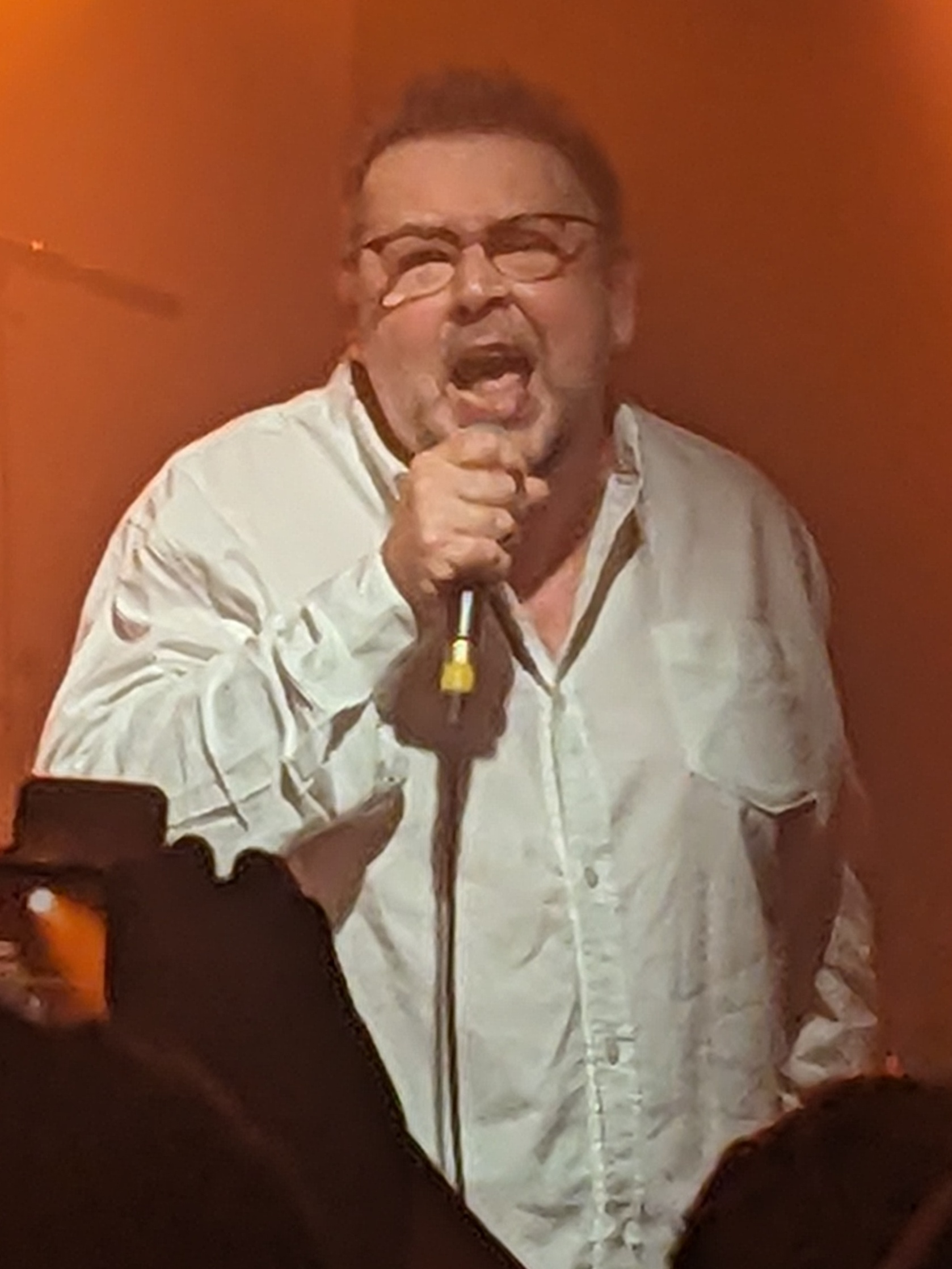
- Cawthra in 2024
- Born: Mark Andrew Cawthra; 28 April 1961 (age 65); Bishop's Stortford, Hertfordshire, England
- Other name: Little Bobby Shattocks
- Occupations: Musician; songwriter; producer; engineer
- Title: Manager of the Infallible Ear
- Relatives: Gypie Mayo (brother)
- Musical career
- Instruments: Drums; guitar; keyboards; bass guitar; vocals
- Years active: 1975–present
- Member of: Redbus Noface
- Formerly of: Cardiacs; The Grown-Ups

Mark Andrew Cawthra (Note: Written "Crawtha" in Echoes and Dust) (born 28 April 1961) is a British musician of the project Redbus Noface and formerly of Cardiacs.

== Biography ==
Mark Andrew Cawthra was born on 28 April 1961 in Bishop's Stortford, Hertfordshire, England. His brother was the guitarist Gypie Mayo. Cawthra's first serious musical activity was in an early (unnamed) music project with schoolfriend Tim Smith (bass guitar) and David Philpot (keyboards), a band in which he was the drummer. The music, a mix of jazz and rock, drew inspiration from the "Canterbury" bands, particularly Egg.

After a period of playing drums with other musicians around Kingston upon Thames, he moved to North Yorkshire and lived there for the whole of 1978. He returned to London in 1979, following an invitation to join Tim and Jim Smith in Cardiac Arrest, replacing Peter Tagg on drums. Other members of the band at this time were Colvin Mayers (keyboards), (later to play with Adrian Borland in the Sound), and Mick Pugh (vocals). The Cardiac Arrest album The Obvious Identity was recorded at this time. Subsequently, he and Tim Smith recorded the band – now renamed Cardiacs – for a number of sessions in a small Surbiton studio. The results became the Cardiacs demo album Toy World. Cawthra may be seen briefly dancing to Cardiacs' "R.E.S" in the Seaside Treats video.

Following a short period in 1982 in which he was Cardiacs' keyboard player and percussionist, he left the band, moved to Birmingham and briefly worked with two of the remaining members of the Birmingham band Dangerous Girls, following their split. The line-up, calling itself TAAGA, produced one single, "Friend of Mine", working with UB40 producer Bob Lamb.

Cardiacs Rude Bootleg was recorded from the mixing desk by Mark on a cassette deck in the effects rack at the Reading Festival. The EQ settings on the mixing desk were left behind from the band who had played last on the night before, Saxon, and needed little alteration.

On returning to London, he worked for the remainder of the 1980s as crew member or live sound engineer, touring with several acts including Immaculate Fools, It's Immaterial, Then Jerico and Bronski Beat. He was also Cardiacs front-of-house engineer at this time, and a member of the band Grown Ups with William D. Drake, Elaine Herman, Jon Bastable (The Trudy), Dominic Luckman and Craig Fortnam. Five tracks were recorded by this line-up but never released.

From 1988, his work was based in and around Leeds, culminating in the building of a 48-track facility, That Studio Where he worked with This et al., producing demo material prior to the release of their Baby Machine album, and with the North Sea Radio Orchestra, mixing their first two albums. The studio was closed down in 2007.

Today, his work is all studio-based, recording and mixing demos and masters in a new home facility in Leeds. Mixing credits include the Emmett Elvin albums Bloody Marvels, Assault on the Tyranny of Reason, The End of Music and Being of Sound Mind, and the Gong album, Rejoice! I'm Dead! working alongside Dave Sturt. His mastering credits in addition to the North Sea Radio Orchestra and Emmett Elvin albums, William D. Drake's second album, Briny Hooves, as well as releases by Local Girls, the post-Oceansize project British Theatre, Charlie Cawood, Knifeworld, and Khyam Allami's debut Resonance/Dissonance, the latter nominated for the 2012 Songlines music award.

He contributed a track and compiled and mastered Leader of the Starry Skies: A Tribute to Tim Smith, Songbook 1, an album produced to gain funds for Tim Smith and his ongoing care, and raise awareness of his work. His first solo project Redbus Noface album #1 If It Fights The Hammer It will Fight The Knife was released on Believer's Roast in 2011. He compiled and mastered Believers Roast's The Exquisite Corpse Game, a collection of contiguous fragments by various artists each of whom has only heard the closing 20 seconds of the previous section. J. G. Thirlwell, Bob Drake, Weasel Walter, Max Tundra and Katherine Blake were among the contributors.

== Discography ==
=== As Mark Cawthra ===
- Songs by Cardiacs and Affectionate Friends - Truth Be Told" CD (2001) ORG228
- Leader of the Starry Skies: A Tribute to Tim Smith, Songbook 1 - Let Alone My Plastic Doll" CD (2010) Believers Roast
- The Rising Of The Lights - William D Drake - "Me Fish Bring" CD (2011) Onomatopoeia

=== As Redbus Noface ===
- Redbus Noface - If It Fights The Hammer It Will Fight The Knife CD (2011) Believers Roast
- Redbus Noface - The Central Element - "Jack Blind Acid" CD (2012) Believers Roast
- Redbus Noface - EP #1 Crumbs In The Deathbed (2021) Self-released

=== Credits ===
List of credits on released recordings
Title	Artist(s)	Year	Producer	Recording engineer	Mixer	Masterer	Instruments	Other	Ref
The Obvious Identity	Cardiac Arrest	1980	Cardiac Arrest	Simon (some); Peter (most)			Drum, voice, handclaps		
Toy World	Cardiacs	1980	Cardiacs	Mark Cawthra; Peter Cunzler	Cardiacs		Drums, voice	Lyrics (with Tim Smith and Jim Smith)	
"Friend of Mine"	Taaga	1983	Taaga; A-Wop-Bop-A-Loo-Bop-Lop-Bob-Lamb				Drums, cymbals, percussives		
The Seaside	Cardiacs	1984	Tim Smith; Graham Simmonds	Graham Simmonds			Drums on "A Wooden Fish on Wheels", "Ice a Spot and a Dot on the Dog" and "To Go Off and Things", keyboards and vocals on other tracks (not credited on every release)	Co-writer on "It's a Lovely Day", "A Wooden Fish on Wheels", "Ice a Spot and a Dot on the Dog", and "To Go Off and Things"	
Seaside Treats	Cardiacs	1985	Tim Smith; Graham Simmonds				Drums on "To Go Off and Things"	Wrote the words for "To Go Off and Things"	
Big Ship	Cardiacs	1987	Tim Smith; Graham Simmonds	Yes	Graham Simmonds; Tim Smith				
Cardiacs Live	Cardiacs	1988						Co-writer on "Cameras"	
Archive Cardiacs	Cardiacs	1989	The Consultant; Miss Swift				Drums, keyboards, vocals	Co-writer on "A Game for Bertie's Party"	
All That Glitters Is a Mares Nest	Cardiacs	1995						Co-writer on "To Go Off and Things"	
North Sea Radio Orchestra	North Sea Radio Orchestra	2006		Yes	Yes	Yes			
Briny Hooves	William D. Drake	2007	William D. Drake; Darryl Anthony	Darryl Anthony	Darryl Anthony	Yes			
Birds	North Sea Radio Orchestra	2008	Yes	Marco Migliari; Bob Reich; Darryl Anthony		Yes			
King of the Down	Arch Garrison	2010	Craig Fortnam; Mark Cawthra	Craig Fortnam					
I a Moon	North Sea Radio Orchestra	2011		Craig Fortnam		Yes			
Resonance/Dissonance	Khyam Allami	2011		Khyam Allami	Khyam Allami	Mark Cawthra; Khyam Allami			
The Rising of the Lights	William D. Drake	2011	Gaz Williams; William D. Drake	Gaz Williams	Gaz Williams	Donal Whelan	Slide guitar on "Me Fish Bring"		
Clairvoyant Fortnight	Knifeworld	2012	Kavus Torabi	Chris Fullard (drums); Grant Leslie (piano)	Yes	Yes			
I Will Be a Pilgrim	Arch Garrison	2014	Craig Fortnam	Craig Fortnam		Yes			
On the Dry Land	The Sea Nymphs	2016			Yes (track 1)	Ron Synovitz		Recording assistance in 2015/16	
Rejoice! I'm Dead!	Gong	2016	Gong	Nick Howiantz; Gong	Mark Cawthra (Note: Except "Beatrix" and "Visions" by Dave Sturt)	Andy Jackson			
The Divine Abstract	Charlie Cawood	2017	Charlie Cawood; Amir Shoat	Amir Shoat; Alex Fletcher; Rich Davis; Antoine Collin; Ali Hakimi	Amir Shoat	Yes			
Singin' to God	The 180 Gs	2018	David Minnick	David Minnick	David Minnick	Yes			
Every Night Something Happens	Lost Crowns	2019	Richard Larcombe; Rhodri Marsden	Richard Larcombe; Rhodri Marsden; Nick Howiantz (drums and bass); Eli Perl (additional)	Rhodri Marsden	Ron Synovitz	Vocals on "Housemaid's Knees" and "Let Loving Her Be Everything"		
Nothing Is Ordinary (vinyl remaster)	Omnia Opera	2019	Neil Spragg	Omina Opera		Matt Colton; Mark Cawthra (remastering)			
Paradise Park	Ham Legion	2019	Nick Howiantz; Ham Legion	Nick Howiantz; Ham Legion		Yes			
The Heart Is In The Body	Lost Crowns	2025	Richard Larcombe; Rhodri Marsden	Richard Larcombe; Rhodri Marsden; Jon Clayton (drums)	Rhodri Marsden	Rhodri Marsden	Vocals on "She Didn't Want", "Et Tu Brute" and "O Alexander"		
Optimal Eternalist	Emmett Elvin	2026	Emmett Elvin	Emmett Elvin		Yes			
