= North Sea Radio Orchestra (album) =

Studio album by North Sea Radio Orchestra
- Released: 2006
- Recorded: 2006
- Studio: Belsize Music Rooms London; That Studio Leeds; Foma London
- Genre: Classical music
- Length: 57:55
- Label: Oof! Records
- Producer: Mark Cawthra

North Sea Radio Orchestra chronology
North Sea Radio Orchestra (2006)	Birds (2008)

North Sea Radio Orchestra is the first album by the English cross-disciplinary musical ensemble, North Sea Radio Orchestra. It was released in 2006 on Oof! Records.

== Background ==
North Sea Radio Orchestra was recorded four years into the existence of North Sea Radio Orchestra (NSRO), and was the ensemble's first full-length recording following a series of limited-edition EPs. It has a collection of songs and instrumental compositions drawn from the ensemble's live repertoire, many of which had been played by NSRO since its inception. All of the material on the album is original compositions, much of it settings of Victorian and Edwardian poetry. These include settings of Thomas Hardy's "Shelley’s Skylark", Yeats' "He Gives His Beloved Certain Rhymes" and "He Wishes For The Cloths Of Heaven", plus the instrumental "Kingstanding" and the part-instrumental/part-choral "Chimes" (featuring a setting of poetry by Henry Wadsworth Longfellow).

Most of the music was written by the group leader Craig Fortnam, but other members of the ensemble also contributed material. William D. Drake provided "Bill's March" and "Mimnermus in Church" (the latter, a setting of a poem by William Johnson Cory with orchestrations by Craig Fortnam). The folk song "Joy for my Heart" was co-written by Sharron Fortnam and Craig Fortnam.

The album was recorded, engineered and mastered by Mark Cawthra.

== Critical reception ==
Professional ratings
Review scores
Source	Rating
Allmusic	

The album received plenty of critical praise. Word magazine called it "a beautiful debut.... unreservedly recommended", while Leeds Guide praised "a style of songwriting and a lyricism (nostalgic, pastoral, quaint) which is peculiarly English and suddenly, in their hands, timeless"; its reviewer dubbed the recording "one of the best albums, whatever the genre, that I have heard this year". Playlouder.com claimed that "North Sea Radio Orchestra splash colour into every corner of the speakers with a regal splendour and effervescent celebration of God, Nature or whatever it is you may wish to call it."

In the underground press, Art Rocker praised the NSRO for "doing something really quite special.....in their ability to ebb and sway and permeate through styles without erring away from the constant series of lush orchestrations", and hailed the record as "the most beautiful album of the year… could surely sway even the most ardent distortion-pedal freak to step back and open their minds and hearts to this." Foggy Notions called it "an everchanging trip, blooming with melody and twinkling beauty from start to finish". Subba Cultcha commented that the ensemble’s music was "stepping easily between genres, sometimes classical, sometimes indie; inspired and compelling and often magical, like the soundtrack to a film that hasn’t been made yet. It’s a thoughtful, melodic and calming record that is sure to attract fans way beyond its classical base."

A review in Boomkat, while drawing attention to the NSRO’s "idiosyncratic bombast", "cartoonishly baroque melodies" and "unbridled eccentricity", praised the orchestra's "considerable performance skills and elegant arrangements", and concluded that the album was "a fairly surreal experience all round".

== Track listing ==
All music is composed by Craig Fortnam except "Mimnermus in Church" and "Bills March" by William D. Drake arr. Fortnam

No.	Title	Lyrics	Length
1.	"Organ Miniature"		0:51
2.	"Every Day Hath Its Night"	Alfred Tennyson	3:22
3.	"Kingstanding"		7:18
4.	"Chimes"	Henry Longfellow	12:32
5.	"Guitar Miniature"		1:11
6.	"Mimnermus in Church"	William Johnson Cory	6:04
7.	"He Gives His Beloved Certain Rhymes"	William Butler Yeats	5:06
8.	"Hole in the Sky"		4:48
9.	"Joy for my Heart"	Sharron Fortnam	3:00
10.	"Shelley's Skylark"	Thomas Hardy	10:12
11.	"He Wishes for the Cloths of Heaven"	Yeats	2:42
12.	"Bill's March"		0:49

== Personnel ==
North Sea Radio Orchestra:

- Craig Fortnam - nylon-string acoustic guitar, bass guitar, chamber organ
- Sharron Fortnam: lead vocals (soprano)
- Richard Larcombe, Dug Parker: vocals (main harmonies)
- James Larcombe: piano, chamber organ
- Ben Davies: piano
- Nicola Baigent: clarinet, bass clarinet
- Geraldine Peach: oboe
- Luke Crookes: bassoon
- Harry Escott: cello
- Jen Underhill, Brian Wright: violins
- Hugh Wilkinson: percussion

North Sea Radio Chorus:

- William D. Drake, Louise Harrison, Suzy Kirby, Gideon Miller, Kavus Torabi, Melanie Woods (with Ben Davies, Sharron Fortnam, Richard Larcombe, Dug Parker and Geraldine Peach)

Guest musician:

- Rob Deschamps: additional percussion on "Every Day Hath Its Night" and "Bill's March"
