= Sharron Fortnam =

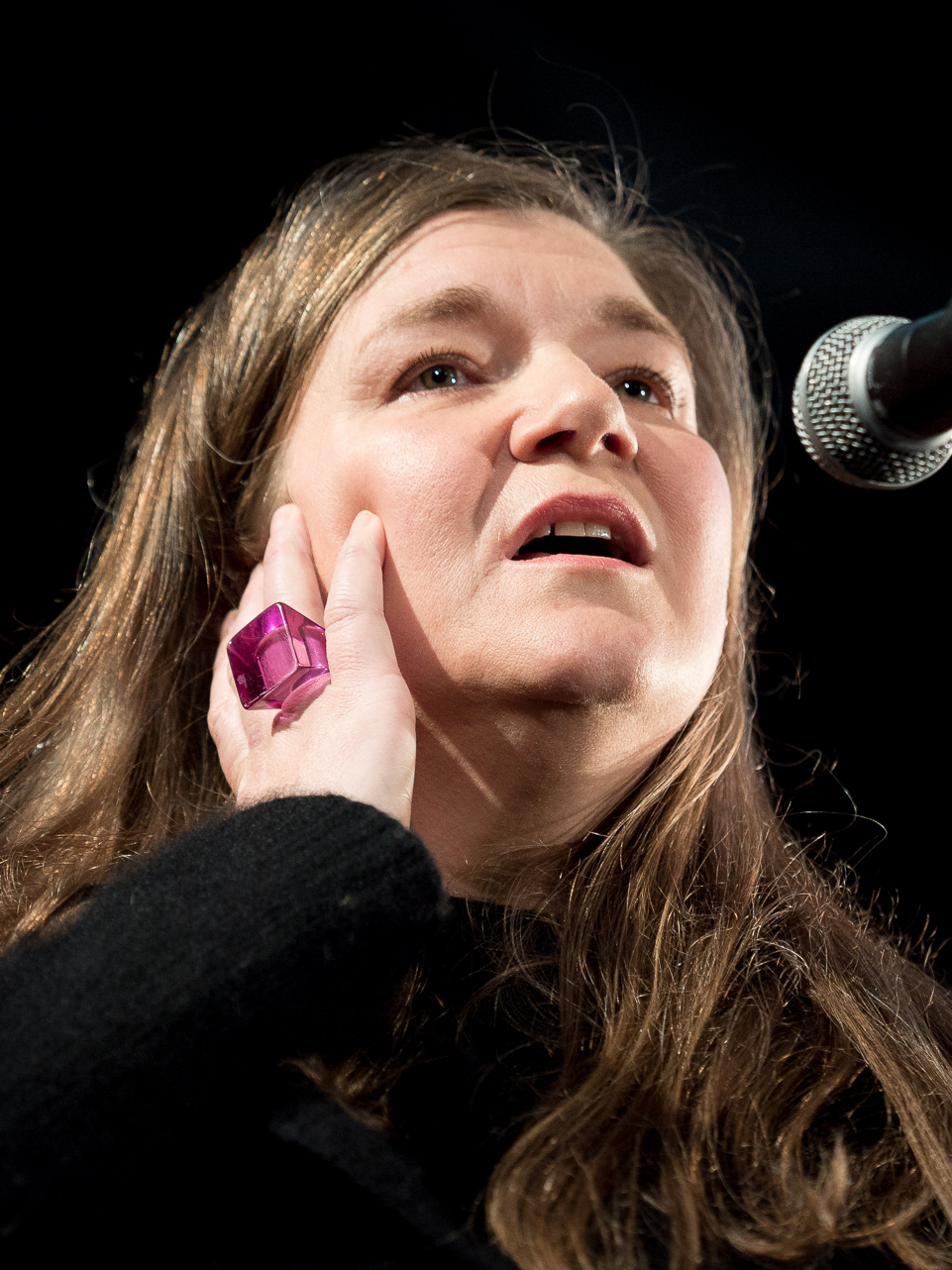
- Fortnam performing with NSRO in 2016
- Born: Sharron Saddington; April 1971 (age 55); Kingston upon Hull, East Riding of Yorkshire, England
- Education: Birkbeck College, University of London (BA (Hons))
- Occupations: Musician; singer; songwriter; copywriter; graphic designer
- Spouse: Craig Fortnam (m. 2003)
- Musical career
- Genres: Art pop; chamber pop; chamber music
- Instruments: Vocals; bass guitar; keyboards; sampler; percussion
- Member of: Cardiacs; Lost Crowns; Article 54; Kugelschreiber
- Formerly of: Lake of Puppies; The Shrubbies; North Sea Radio Orchestra; The fFortingtons

Sharron Fortnam (née Saddington, born April 1971) is an English musician and songwriter. A singer and bass guitarist, she is the leader of the art pop band Kugelschrieber and a member of both Cardiacs and Lost Crowns. She has previously been a member of North Sea Radio Orchestra, The Shrubbies, Lake of Puppies, Arch Garrison and the fFortingtons, as well as collaborating with Led Bib.

== Background/career ==
=== Early years and bands, including Lake of Puppies and the Shrubbies (1996–1999) ===
Sharron Saddington was born in Kingston upon Hull in April 1971 into a musical family in which "everyone [could] sing." She became a bass guitarist out of necessity, having started a three-piece band which needed a bassist.

Saddington befriended Cardiacs keyboard player William D. Drake in 1987. Moving to London in late 1993, by 1996 she had formed a new band with Drake called Lake of Puppies. She remembers "I definitely influenced Bill, and he influenced me, but he was the master of that ship. I was just amazed. I've been thinking 'you were so punching above your weight' but then, I like to punch above my weight. It's how you learn, and I like going feet first. I like making life hard for myself, basically." The duo soon recruited three further members - clarinettist Bernie Holden, drummer Chin Keeler and Saddington's future husband and musical partner Craig Fortnam on nylon-string guitar. Despite recording an EP's worth of material (which remained unreleased until 2024), Lake of Puppies was a short-lived band and had split up by 1997.

Saddington then teamed up with Craig Fortnam to form a new band - initially called Shrubby Veronica and subsequently The Shrubbies - with saxophonist/keyboard player/cellist Sarah Smith (another ex-Cardiac) and drummer Ben Clarke (shortly replaced by yet another Cardiac, Dominic Luckman). As with Lake of Puppies, Saddington sang and played bass guitar; she shared the songwriting duties with Fortnam, who set many of the poems that she had originally written in her bedroom next to the North Sea. The Shrubbies gigged around London for a couple of years, recording and releasing an album called Memphis in Texas in 1997 on the Merlin Audio label, and with Dan Maitland eventually replacing Sarah Smith before the band split up in 1999.

In 2003, Sharron Saddington and Craig Fortnam married, and consequently Saddington was known as Sharron Fortnam from that point onwards.

=== Cardiacs (1998–1999, 2004–2007, 2024–present) ===
Now firmly established within the group of musicians surrounding Cardiacs, Sharron contributed backing vocals to the recording sessions for the band's 1999 album Guns (and on the non-album song "Faster Than Snakes with a Ball and a Chain"). She joined the live Cardiacs band in late 2004, again as backing singer (and featured lead vocalist on "Will Bleed Amen"), but left in 2007.

In 2024, she made a guest appearance with the Cardiacs Family & Friends band who performed the "Sing to Tim" tribute concerts to the late Cardiacs leader Tim Smith. Having contributed to the sessions for the posthumously-released Cardiacs album LSD (2025), she then rejoined the band as a full member, singing backing vocals in concert (as well as all of the female lead vocal parts from all Cardiacs eras).

=== North Sea Radio Orchestra, Arch Garrison, and the fFortingtons (2002–2023) ===
Following the split of the Shrubbies in 1999, Sharron and Craig Fortnam continued their musical partnership as the core duo of North Sea Radio Orchestra, which emerged in 2001.

The project began as a contemporary music ensemble and cross-disciplinary chamber orchestra, playing original settings of English Romantic poetry as well as original songs and instrumental pieces. As the ensemble was gradually reduced to a more workable scale, NSRO developed into a smaller group with more affinities with Krautrock and chamber pop. During her time with the project, Sharron sang the majority of the lead vocals as well as contributing lyrics and directing the artwork.

During this period, the Fortnams also worked together in two other projects.

- The fFortingtons were an occasional acoustic pop trio (and partial Lake of Puppies reunion) consisting of the Fortnams plus William D. Drake, who had initiated the project by approaching Sharron and asking her what sort of music she'd like to do next. The fFortingtons made a few low-key concert appearances and supported Sidi Bou Said at the latter's one-off reunion gig at The Water Rats, London, in 2005, but did not release any recordings (though some do exist).
- Arch Garrison was initially a Craig-fronted folk-influenced duo playing his original songs, to which Sharron lent backing vocals. Sharron played on the band's 2010 debut album King of the Down, but left before the second album, I Will Be A Pilgrim. She did, however, co-write and sang on one ...Pilgrim song, "O Sweet Tomorrow" (originally a fFortingtons tune).

Having written and played on five North Sea Radio Orchestra albums, Sharron left NSRO circa 2019 to focus on her own projects.

=== Lost Crowns (2019–present) ===
Sharron Fortnam sings harmony vocals as a full member of Richard Larcombe's experimental rock septet Lost Crowns. She has appeared on both of the project's albums to date – 2019's Every Night Something Happens and 2025's The Heart is in the Body.

=== Kugelschreiber (2024–present) ===
Following her departure from North Sea Radio Orchestra, Sharron Fortnam formed and led a new project called Kugelschreiber in which she sings lead vocals, composes the majority of song material and plays bass guitar, keyboards, sampler and tuned percussion. The other members of the band are currently James Larcombe on keyboards, hurdy-gurdy, sampler and backing vocals, Chip Cummins on drums, percussion and backing vocals (plus additional guitar and keyboards) and Jen Macro on guitar.

The first Kugelschreiber album, Cheerleaders, was released in 2024 on Sharron's own label Wamho (as was the long-delayed Lake of Puppies EP). Produced by Fortnam, Cummins and Jesse Cutts (Spratleys) it features guest appearances from all members of Led Bib, flute player Chris Williams and guitarist Mike Vennart (Oceansize, Biffy Clyro, Empire State Bastard, Cardiacs), plus Sarah Measures (ex-Monsoon Bassoon), Emily Jones and Rob Crow (Pinback, Heavy Vegetable, etc) on additional vocals.

Giving the album an eight-out-of-ten rating, whisperinandhollerin described it as "quirky, harmony-led alt-pop that sort of sounds like Young Marble Giants crossed with Steeleye Span with additional glockenspiel", noting "the spirit of 2004 post-rock explosion which also feels like a part of the stylistic infusion which makes this album. It’s big on hippy, trippy, folksy woodwind and tinkling chimes. For all the aspirations, it’s rather less funk ‘n’ flex pop than low-key bedroom pop, although to my ears, at least, it’s all the better for it. But it’s big on lo-fi indie groove, strong on melody, and pleasant on the ear."

Writing in The Quietus, Sean Kitching called "Cheerleaders" "a winning formula of infectious keyboard and percussive grooves that’s consistently emotionally affecting and at times outright psychedelic" with "a lightness, in keeping with the poppy aspect of these tunes, that doesn’t sacrifice depth". Dubbing it one of his "stand-out albums so far this year", he also hailed the album's closing track "Hold On, Space Cadet!" as his favourite piece of music of 2024. Andrew Neal of Silent Radio called Cheerleaders "excellent" and "an album that takes the individuality of its influences together with the songwriting qualities they possess and sprinkles a heady covering of magic dust on top." Roger Trenwith of The Progressive Aspect described it as "a shimmering album of sweet but not too sweet delights" in which "the music is gently insistent, like a cat kneading the duvet to get you to wake up and feed it... Sharron's Kugelschreiber have written their mark on the pop history of 2024, I just hope enough folk sit up and take notice."

Preceded by two singles, "(me x u) ≠ (u x me)" and "Fuck Symmetry", Cheerleaders was supported the same year by a short English tour with Liverpool experimental rockers a.P.a.T.T..

=== Other projects ===
As a backing singer, Sharron Fortnam appeared on William D. Drake's Briny Hooves album (2007) and on the eponymous debut album by Italian progressive rock band Not a Good Sign (in 2013). She has been a contributor to Rhodri Marsden's Brexit-themed "disco symphony" project Article 54, and has sung two songs on two separate Kev Hopper albums, Moving and Handling and Sans Noodles.

In 2018, Steve Feigenbaum of Cuneiform Records introduced Fortnam to Mark Holub of experimental jazz band Led Bib, who invited her to contribute to new Led Bib material. She eventually contributed most of the vocals and lyrics to the band's 2019 album It's Morning. She has reflected "I could easily have said no, because at the time I was feeling quite under-confident. I was just coming out of early motherhood and stuff like that, which does take such a lot from all of you; you come out wondering 'Who am I?'. But I said yes, because I'd decided a couple of weeks before that I was going to start saying yes to everything. I can be quite fearless, and that's not always a good thing, but I'll take it. And it does lead to all these experiences, and some of them are not great. But I've generally been quite lucky, quite charmed in that way that – I've said yes, and I've gone for it, and it's worked out."

=== Equipment, inspirations and approach ===
Sharron began her bass guitar playing career with a Guild bass which was "knacked, it had a hill in the middle of it that you had to navigate." She currently plays a Fender Mustang Bass, and favours fingerpicking. Geddy Lee of Rush was an initial inspiration as a player; more recently, she has cited Kev Hopper (Stump, etc.), Jesse Cutts (Spratleys), Ruth Goller (Melt Yourself Down, Let Spin, Vula Viel, Shabaka Hutchings, etc.) and Rob Crow as current inspirations.

"I think that that's our job as bass players. We're here to make you feel entirely safe. It's our key role. When you go to a show you should just be able to leave everything behind and just be in a situation of escapism, and in a moment with the players and the people around you. For me, the main role of the bass is to provide that for you: that safety. You're in safe hands, and if I don't play well, that's my problem, not yours. An audience should never have to be worried about anything."

— Sharron Fortnam

Sharron has cited ABBA as a particular influence on her singing technique and approach to harmony writing, commenting "I have an Agnetha voice and a Frida voice and I do it on purpose sometimes because I want to use certain words in a song, and if I continue in the voice I've started in, that word is going to be hard to sing. So I might have to go a little bit nasal, and that's like Agnetha. If you want to go a little bit saucy, that's Frida." She has also claimed Field Music, Broadcast, Prince and Pixies as further inspirations.

Regarding singing and bass playing, Sharron has commented that it is "hard to do them separately. They make sense of one another. The difficulty comes when occasionally I'll record something and I haven't finished writing the melody, and I need to add it later. That means I've got to learn it, and it's really hard when it hasn't come from the same place as the rest of the song. That's the only time it feels remotely complicated." Before starting Kugelschreiber, she went through a fifteen year period of not playing bass, and has described this as having been "a really great thing, to start again and start something new. It became a way of expressing almost impossibly complicated feelings. Words wouldn't be able to do it, but the bass can."

Her songwriting, with Kugelschreiber in particular, is "inspired by scientific concepts, human behaviour and parallels between the two" as well as by visual art.

== Graphic design ==
Sharron Fortnam works as a graphic designer under the company name of herstrangehand, which is responsible for all Kugelschreiber artwork as well as the art for Arch Garrison's King of the Down and the first three North Sea Radio Orchestra albums (the self-titled debut, Birds and I a Moon).

== Discography ==
=== with The Shrubbies ===
- "The Shrubbies" (EP, Merlin Audio, MER97028CD, 1997)
- Memphis in Texas (album, Merlin Audio, MER99105CD, 1999)

=== with Cardiacs ===
- Guns (album, The Alphabet Business Concern, ALPH CD 027, 1999)
- Greatest Hits (compilation album, The Alphabet Business Concern, ALPH CD 029, 2001)
- Cardiacs EP (EP, Melodic Virtue, MVP008, 2025)
- LSD (album, The Alphabet Business Concern, ALPHDCD033, 2025)

=== with North Sea Radio Orchestra ===
- "North Sea Radio Orchestra" (EP, 2003, private release)
- "The Flower" (single, Oof! Records, OOF 002, 2005)
- North Sea Radio Orchestra (album, Oof! Records, OOF006, 2006)
- "The End of Chimes" (single, Oof! Records, OOF009, 2007)
- Various Artists, The Arctic Circle Presents: That Fuzzy Feeling (LoAF, LOAF14+, 2007) – NSRO contributes “O Come O Come Emanuel”
- Birds (album, Oof! Records, OOF010, 2008)
- Various Artists, Mojo Presents: The Wall Re-Built! (Disc Two) (Cherry Red Records, MOJOCDD1002, 2009) – NSRO contributes "Vera/Bring the Boys Back Home"
- I a Moon (album, The Household Mark, THM001, 2011)
- Various Artists, Leader of the Starry Skies: A Tribute to Tim Smith, Songbook 1 (Believers Roast, BR 003, 2011) – NSRO contributes "March"
- Dronne (album, The Household Mark, THM004, 2016)
- Gap Species (compilation album from early EPs/singles/rarities, The Household Mark, THM005, 2019)

=== with Arch Garrison ===
- King of the Down (album, Double Six Records, DS021CD, 2010)
- I Will Be a Pilgrim (album, The Household Mark, THM003, 2010) - co-writing and backing vocals on "O Sweet Tomorrow" only

=== with Lost Crowns ===
- "Sound as Colour" (single, Bad Elephant Music, no catalogue number/video-only release, 2019)
- "Let Loving Her Be Everything" (single, Bad Elephant Music, no catalogue number/video-only release, 2019)
- Every Night Something Happens (album, Bad Elephant Music, BEM065, 2019)
- "Et Tu Brute" (single, Believers Roast, no catalogue number/video-only release, 2025)
- The Heart is in the Body (album, Believers Roast, BR39CD, 2025)

=== with Led Bib ===
- It's Morning (album, RareNoise Records, RNR108, 2019)

=== with Lake of Puppies ===
- Lake of Puppies (EP, Wamho Records, ERB001, 2024)

=== with Kugelschrieber ===
- "(me x u) ≠ (u x me)" (single, Wamho Records, no catalogue number/download-only, 2024)
- "Fuck Symmetry" (single, Wamho Records, no catalogue number/download-only, 2024)
- Cheerleaders (album, Wamho Records, ERB002, 2024)

=== as guest performer ===
- Ginger, Yoni (album, Round Records, 2007) - vocals
- William D. Drake, Briny Hooves (album, SheBear Records, SHECUB001, 2007) - backing vocals on "The Fountains Smoke" and "Melancholy World"
- Not a Good Sign, Not a Good Sign (album, Fading Records/AltrOck Productions, FAD009, 2013) - backing vocals
- Article 54, The Hustle (album, self-released, 199341E, 2019) - vocals
- Article 54, Stayin' Alive (album, self-released, 209621E, 2020) - vocals
- Kev Hopper, Moving and Handling (album, self-released, 2020) - vocals on "Moving and Handling"
- Emmett Elvin, Being of Sound Mind, (album, Bad Elephant Music, 2020) - vocals
- Kev Hopper, Sans Noodles (album, Dimple Discs, 2022) - vocals on "Fruit Flies"
