= Leader of the Starry Skies: A Tribute to Tim Smith, Songbook 1 =

Compilation album by various artists
- Released: 13 December 2010
- Genre: Psychedelic rock
- Length: 73:56
- Label: Believers Roast
- Producer: Bic Hayes; Jo Spratley

Singles from Leader of the Starry Skies: A Tribute to Tim Smith, Songbook 1
- 1. "Stoneage Dinosaurs" Released: 16 April 2011

A Loyal Companion: A Tribute to Tim Smith

Leader of the Starry Skies: A Tribute to Tim Smith, Songbook 1 is a compilation album featuring cover versions of songs by Tim Smith, the songwriter behind Cardiacs, The Sea Nymphs, Spratleys Japs and his solo project OceanLandWorld. It was released on CD on 13 December 2010 on the Believers Roast label (via Genepool distribution). The release date for download, via iTunes, was 20 December 2010.

All contributing artists and bands have either stated a strong Cardiacs influence in their music, profess sincere admiration for Smith's work, or feature at least one person who has at some time been involved with Cardiacs. Contributors to the project include The Magic Numbers, Robert White of The Milk and Honey Band with Andy Partridge (XTC), Steven Wilson of Porcupine Tree, Katharine Blake of Mediaeval Baebes, progressive rock band Oceansize, Julianne Regan of All About Eve, 1990s Britpop band Ultrasound (who reunited especially to record their cover version), Jason Pegg of Clearlake and no less than five former Cardiacs members -keyboard player William D. Drake, drummer and keyboard player Mark Cawthra, guitarist Bic Hayes (under the project name of mikrokosmos), guitarist Kavus Torabi (with his Knifeworld project) and drummer Peter Tagg (with the Trudy).

The album was recorded as a response to Tim Smith's hospitalisation in 2008 (following a combined heart attack and stroke in London) was released on Torabi's Believers Roast label in order to raise funds for his care and recovery. All profits from the album sales went directly to help Tim Smith. A bonus disc, called A Loyal Companion, was free with CD preorders.

== Track listing ==
All titles by Tim Smith

1. "Savour" – William D. Drake
2. "Big Ship" – Ultrasound
3. "Fear" – Oceansize
4. "Let Alone My Plastic Doll" – Mark Cawthra
5. "Day Is Gone" – The Trudy
6. "Foundling" – Stars in Battledress
7. "Will Bleed Amen" – Max Tundra featuring Sarah Measures
8. "Shaping the River" – Julianne Regan
9. "The Stench of Honey" – Knifeworld
10. "A Little Man and a House" – The Magic Numbers
11. "Is This the Life" – mikrokosmos
12. "March" – North Sea Radio Orchestra
13. "Lilly White's Party" – Robert White with Andy Partridge
14. "Wind and Rains is Cold" – Rose Kemp vs. Rarg
15. "Up in Annie's Room" – Katharine Blake
16. "Stoneage Dinosaurs" – Steven Wilson
17. "Home of Fadeless Splendour" – The Scaramanga Six

A Loyal Companion

1. "Spell With a Shell" – Silvery
2. "Arnald" – Eureka Machines
3. "Gloomy News" – The Gasman
4. "My Trademark" – Bug Prentice
5. "Victory Egg" – Sidi Bou Said
6. "To Go Off and Things" – Panixphere
7. "I Hold My Love in My Arms" – Local Girls
8. "Dirty Boy" – Sterbus
9. "Tree Tops High" – Jason Pegg
10. "Everything Is Easy" – The Scaramanga Six
11. "Joining the Plankton" – a/c woods
12. "Dead Mouse" – Spiritwo
13. "All Spectacular" – Agency
14. "Nurses Whispering Verses" – Idiot Box
15. "The Barnacle Tree" – Sarah Cutts (hidden track)
16. "Odd Even" – Local Girls (digital only, hidden track)
17. "Dead Mouse" – Ham Legion (digital only, hidden track)
18. "A Duck And Roger The Horse" – Stephen EvEns (digital only, hidden track)

== Personnel ==
- Tim Cook – artwork
- Phil Selfe – photography
- Robert White – design & layout
- Mastered by Mark Cawthra
- Produced by Bic Hayes & Jo Spratley

=== Songbook 1 ===
"Savour"

- Dug Parker – vocals, glockenspiel
- Nicola Baigent – clarinets
- Jon Bastable – bass guitars
- Mark Cawthra – drums, ukulele, acoustic and slide guitars
- William D. Drake – vocals, piano, television organ, melodica

"Big Ship"

- Andrew "Tiny" Wood – vocals and shit
- Richard James Green – guitars and whatnot
- Vanessa Best – bass and that
- Matt Jones – keyboards and stuff
- Andy Peace – drums and whathaveyou
- Recorded at Livingstone by Kevin Feazey(The Fierce and the Dead)

"Fear"

- Mike Vennart – vocals, guitar
- Steve Durose – guitar, vocals
- Gambler – guitar, keyboards
- Steven Hodson – bass
- Mark Heron – drums
- Recorded by Steve Durose produced by Oceansize

"Let Alone My Plastic Doll"

- Recorded with love and performed (with vocal support from Ms Julie Peace) by Mark Cawthra at That Studio Wiltshire

"Day Is Gone"

- Melissa Jo Heathcote
- Del Tagg
- Paul Crook
- Peter Tagg
- Eugene Bezodis
- Recorded by Del Tagg. Produced by The Trudy and mixed by Mark Cawthra

"Foundling"

- Richard Larcombe – voice, guitar, handbells
- James Larcombe – piano, voice, hurdy-gurdy, autoharp

"Will Bleed Amen"

- Recorded by Ben Jacobs at The Electric Smile. Woodwinds and lady vocals by Sarah Measures

"Shaping the River"

- Julianne Regan (with a chunk of Mr Drake in the middle) Ms Regan smugly plays and sings everything else

"The Stench of Honey"

- Kavus Torabi – guitars, singing, percussion, devices
- Melanie Woods – singing
- Emmett Elvin – keys
- Chloe Herrington – saxophone, bassoon, recorder
- Craig Fortnam – bass guitar
- Stephen Gilchrist – drums
- Recorded at The Cop's Dream. Produced by Kavus Torabi

"A Little Man and a House"

- Ben Amesbury – engineering, mixing, backing vocals
- Romeo Stodart – mixing
- Tom Clues – backing vocals, additional drums
- Recorded at TMN's Wrecking Ball Studios Livingston London

"Is This the Life"

- Recorded and mixed by Christian Hayes at The Monastery Hampshire

Featuring:

- Jesse Joe Cutts – lead guitar
- Jo Spratley – voice

"March"

- Nicky Baigent – clarinet
- Luke Crookes – bassoon
- Ben Davies – piano
- Harry Escott – cello
- Craig Fortnam – guitar, synth
- Sharron Fortnam – voice
- James Larcombe – organ
- Hugh Wilkinson – percussion
- Brian Wright – violin
- Produced by Mark Cawthra

"Lilly White's Party"

- Robert White – keyboards, bass programming, singing
- Andy Partridge – zither, backing vocals
- Produced and mixed by Robert White at Pookhill Barn Firle

"Wind and Rains Is Cold"

- Rose Kemp – vocals
- Rarg – track

"Up in Annie's Room"

- Performed, arranged, produced and engineered by Katharine Blake

"Stoneage Dinosaurs"

- Recorded solo at No Man's Land by Steven Wilson

"Home of Fadeless Splendour"

- Julia Arnez – guitars, vocals
- Paul Morricone – guitars, vocals, Q-chord
- Steven Morricone – bass, vocals, piano, flexatone, glockenspiel
- Stephen Gilchrist – drumbs, more drumbs, even more drumbs

=== A Loyal Companion ===
"Spell With a Shell"

- James – guitar, vocal
- Jarvis – bass
- Lewis – drums

with:

- Jessica Grace Everitt – additional vocals
- Recorded by Kevin James Feazey(The Fierce and the Dead) at Pinna Studio London

"Arnald"

- Chris Catalyst – guitar, bass, xylophone, keys, bottles, vocals
- Davros – guitar, bottles, vocals
- Pete Human – bass, bottles, vocals
- Wayne Insane – big drums
- Studio time graciously donated for The Cause by Matt Peel and Andy Hawkins at Cottage Road Studios Headingley Leeds

"Gloomy News"

- Christopher Reeves he did it all

"My Trademark"

- Ally Craig – vocals, guitar
- Ruth Goller – bass, vocals
- Stephen Gilchrist – drums, vocals
- Produced by Andrew Wane

"Victory Egg"

- Claire Lemmon – guitar, vocals
- Gayl Gordon – bass guitar
- Melanie Woods – drums, vocals
- Recorded by Kavus Torabi and mixed by Sel Belamir

"To Go Off and Things"

- Bic – shouting, guitar
- Jon Poole – guitar, shouting
- Craig Fortnam – bass, shouting and laughing
- Steve Gilchrist – drums, nuisance

"I Hold My Love in My Arms"

- Ginger Bitter – singing
- Dr. Woody Fontaine – bass
- Military Spode – drums
- El Hubris – guitar

"Dirty Boy"

- Sterbus – vocals, acoustic guitar, loyalty, Nuisance, backing vocals
- Lucio Vaccaro – soprano sax
- Francesco Grammatico – producing, piano bits
- Joe Inkpen – chords finder

"Tree Tops High"

- Produced by Jason Pegg

"Everything Is Easy"

- Julia Arnez – guitars, vocals
- Paul Morricone – guitars, vocals, baritone sax
- Steven Morricone – bass, vocals, piano, tenor sax
- Stephen Gilchrist – drums
- Rob Paul Chapman – trombone
- Recorded and mixed by Alan Smyth at 2fly Studios in Sheffield

"Joining the Plankton"

- Adam Woods did it
- Jon Poole played bass and mixed it

"Dead Mouse"

- Arranged, produced and performed by Yael Claire
- Shemi Frenkel – bagpipes performance
- Mixed by Nick Stenning

"All Spectacular"

- Jemima Waller (and Theo McGuinness) – vocals
- Simon Waller – guitar, bass
- Felix Waller – cello
- Adam Woods – drums
- Adam McGuinness – keyboards
- Zia McGuinness – recorder, accordion
- Maryan Balkwill – cello arrangement

"Nurses Whispering Verses"

- Rebecca Stubbs – keys
- Ade Clark – bass
- Kris Barfordr – drums
- Richard Bolton – guitar, vox
- Gareth Pugh – guitar
