= North Sea Radio Orchestra =

UK orchestra

- Orchestra
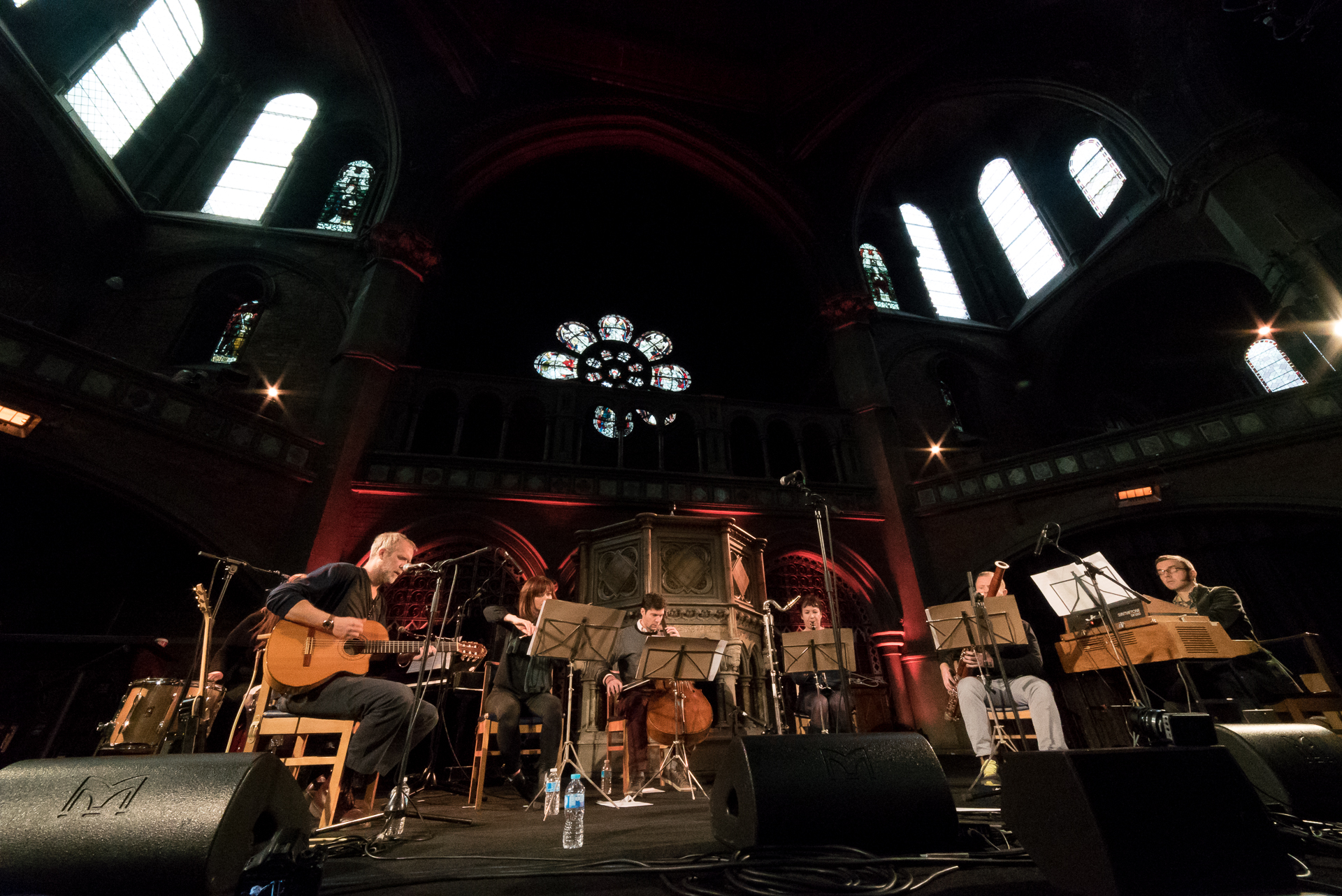
- 2016 concert at Union Chapel
- Short name: NSRO
- Founded: 2002
- Location: London, England
- Principal conductor: Craig Fortnam
- Website: nsro.co.uk

The North Sea Radio Orchestra (NSRO) is an English contemporary music ensemble and cross-disciplinary chamber orchestra (plus chorus). Formed in 2002, the NSRO was set up mainly as a vehicle for the compositions of its musical director, Craig Fortnam, but has also performed works by William D. Drake and James Larcombe. The ensemble is notable for its post-modern fusion of Romantic music and later twentieth-century forms, and for its bridging of the worlds of contemporary classical music, British folk music, London art rock and poetry.

== Sound and presentation ==
The North Sea Radio Orchestra is an ensemble of varying size, drawing on a pool of up to twenty members. It performs compositions which range from single-instrument solos and voice-and-guitar duos up to full chamber-orchestra-and-choir pieces (and all points in between, including assorted trios, quartets, quintets etc.). The instrumentation within the ensemble features woodwind, strings, orchestral and electronic percussion, nylon-string guitar, chamber organ, piano and the human voice. In some line-ups, between six and ten members have sung as "the North Sea Chorus".

Compositionally, the NSRO favours original material with elements of the following – tonal/melodic classical composition, English choral and festival music, modern and ancient folk music, and minimalism. Some improvisation is also encouraged. The NSRO themselves cite influences including Benjamin Britten, television composer Vernon Elliott, The Incredible String Band, Vaughan Williams, and more metaphysical influences such as "London clay, water from the Thames and shingle from Bankside". Various critics have also made comparisons to the music of rock/classical/crossover musicians such as Simon Jeffes' Penguin Café Orchestra, Sean O'Hagan's High Llamas, Frank Zappa, Clogs, Sufjan Stevens, Max Richter, Nick Drake, Virginia Astley, Kate St John and Peter Warlock. Since 2010, the band has displayed a stronger influence of Krautrock.

Another frequently cited compositional influence on the NSRO is Tim Smith, leader of the British psychedelic rock group Cardiacs (which incorporates influences including Early and baroque music). The NSRO is generally regarded as being part of the collection of varied musical groups connected with Cardiacs: it includes in its line-up one former and one current member of Cardiacs, plus at least five other musicians associated with the band.

"There's no pining for anything, we don't walk around in waistcoats. But it is very much informed by certain types of English music, those are my influences."

— Craig Fortnam explains the apparent "nostalgic English" sound of NSRO

For much of its existence, the NSRO was nostalgic in presentation and themes. Between 2002 and 2010, the poetry chosen for musical settings was predominantly classic 18th /19th/ early 20th century pre-modernist material, chosen for "its natural song-like meter and rhyme". with the ensemble's subtler post-modern elements generally restricted to the musical content. Poets chosen included W. B. Yeats, Thomas Hardy and Alfred, Lord Tennyson. Craig Fortnam has also set modern texts, written in the same nostalgic vein by Daniel Dundas Maitland. Since 2010, the band's work has focussed on setting Craig and Sharron Fortnam's original lyrics.

== History ==
=== Prehistory ===
While growing up in Kingston upon Thames and playing in psychedelic rock bands as a teenager, Craig Fortnam gravitated towards the cluster of bands surrounding the long-standing British psychedelic band Cardiacs. He went on to study composition and guitar at Dartington College of Arts. Graduating in 1990, he returned to London. During this period he composed material written for a variety of classical genres and ensembles, but also became involved with the London underground rock scene as a guitarist. One of the bands which he played in was the psychedelic acoustic band Lake of Puppies, led by Fortnam's friend (and former Cardiacs keyboard player) William D. Drake. The band gigged infrequently and recorded a few tracks, but never released an album. However, the band also featured singer and bass guitarist Sharron Saddington. The two would also become longtime musical partners, and following their marriage, she would become known as Sharron Fortnam.

In 1995, Craig and Sharron teamed up with two other former Cardiacs (saxophonist/keyboard player Sarah Smith and drummer Dominic Luckman) to form the Shrubbies. This band gigged enthusiastically in London for several years (playing concerts with like-minded bands such as The Monsoon Bassoon, Podsdarapomuk and Delicate AWOL) and released one eponymous EP in 1997 followed by the album Memphis in Texas in 1999. However, Fortnam began to become disillusioned with the poor etiquette and atmosphere he encountered at rock concerts, later recalling "I began to realise that most people were there for a social thing, and people were talking all the way through. That just started annoying me and I thought, 'I'll write music that doesn't have drums, that isn't loud, and we'll play places where people sit down and then they won't talk." The Shrubbies split up in 1998, and the now-married Fortnams opted to pursue a more ambitious and flexible project which could showcase both Craig's contemporary classical compositions and Sharron's unconventional singing voice (which blended elements of classical mezzo-soprano with folk and pop stylings). Recruiting several other musicians, they set up the North Sea Radio Orchestra.

=== 2002–2003: The City Church concerts ===
The North Sea Radio Orchestra first appeared in public via a series of successful concerts in various antique churches within the square mile of the City of London – St Martin, Ludgate; St Clement Eastcheap and St Olave Hart Street. Taking place during 2002 and 2003, these concerts were publicised mainly by word-of-mouth. They were very much self-motivated occasions with a slightly antique/Edwardian feel (complete with home-made art-deco-styled concert programmes designed by Sharron Fortnam).

"It was thirty quid to hire a church in the City of London, so I thought, I know, we'll just do gigs in city churches, and it'll be like this weird thing, this funny band who play in churches. And the music I wrote, I was really aware of the acoustic potential, so some songs were definitely written so I could have this amazing piano chord that just goes 'ching!' and just let it ring for a bit. It's just a way of creating your own world, isn't it? Nobody else is doing that, so that's half the battle – doing something different."

— Craig Fortnam on the early City of London church concerts

Members of NSRO for the first concert included the Fortnams, percussionist Hugh Wilkinson, cellist/composer Harry Escott and organist/composer James Larcombe (of Stars in Battledress), all of whom would continue in the ensemble long-term. Other performers included Nick Hayes (clarinet). Inspired by the success of the first few concerts, the NSRO began to expand (ultimately becoming a twenty-person ensemble). While the instrumentalists were mostly drawn from the classical world, the vocal chorus contained former Shrubbies concert-mates and collaborators from the Fortnams' time on the London art rock circuit. These included current and former members of Stars in Battledress, The Monsoon Bassoon and Sidi Bou Said. Stars in Battledress frontman Richard Larcombe (brother of James) also shared some lead vocal parts with Sharron Fortnam. Later on, the Fortnam's former Lake of Puppies bandmate William D. Drake joined the ensemble as chorus singer and occasional solo pianist.

A few demo CDs were also made available at this time. These included early recordings of Craig Fortnam's settings of Tennyson's "The Flower" and "Every Day Hath Its Night" and the Zappa-esque "Nest of Tables". Early (and very positive) reviews of both the EP and the concerts appeared in underground publications including Organ and Evophonic.

=== 2004–2006: The NSRO gains wider attention ===
In October 2004 the NSRO played a concert at Bush Hall in West London which was reviewed by John L. Walters in The Guardian. Walters drew attention to the initial difficulties in classifying the ensemble's music but drew positive conclusions: “Is it ironic? Romantic retro? Or post-minimalist post-modernity? Behold the eleven-piece chamber orchestra beneath the chandeliers of Bush Hall, and you realise that Craig Fortnam, their leader and chief composer, is utterly serious in his quest for accessible, intelligent, non-trivial music…. What makes the NSRO special is Fortnam's gift for orchestration, the deft and original way he puts deceptively simple materials in the hands of sophisticated performers. Melody pours from his pen on every page."

In 2005, the NSRO released their first formal EP The Flower (on seven-inch vinyl) on the tiny London independent label Oof! Records. It contained a re-recorded version of "The Flower", plus two more Tennyson settings ("The Lintwhite" and "Move Eastward Happy Earth") and three instrumental pieces ("Music For Two Clarinets And Piano", "Organ Miniature No. 1" and "Nest of Tables"). On 22 October 2005 the NSRO played their first concert at St Martin in the Fields, Trafalgar Square, London.

On 31 July 2006 the North Sea Radio Orchestra performed at the Spitz, East London at a Music Orbit evening (a spin-off of the iF Festival) alongside NEM and Makeshift. The evening was presented as "a combination of gamelan, improvisation, electronica and lyrical chamber music." In September 2006, an NSRO track appeared on the nu-folk compilation album Folk Off: New Folk and Psychedelia from the British Isles and North America – this was the Craig Fortnam solo performance of “Guitar Miniature”.

The NSRO performed at the Spitz again on 28 October 2006 (supported by William D. Drake). This concert received a five-star review in the Daily Telegraph which nominated the "superbly disciplined chamber ensemble" as "the kind of deserving enterprise the BBC should really be throwing money at," and singled out praise for Sharon Fortnam's voice as possessing "dazzling, pre-industrial clarity." Reviewing the same concert, underground e-zine Bubblejam commented on the intimate quality of the music and the quality of the concert itself – "not unlike being at a church service or a poetry recital – the crowd were completely rapt and utterly silent." The reviewer also concluded "for an all too brief time, they evoke an atmosphere of timeless beauty in the otherwise harsh environs of the East End. If I met an extra-terrestrial and wanted to communicate the concept of Englishness quickly and easily, I could do a lot worse than to play them the music of the North Sea Radio Orchestra."

=== 2006: Release of debut album ===
In October 2006 the NSRO released their debut album – North Sea Radio Orchestra – on Oof! Records. The album was recorded, engineered and mastered by former Cardiacs member Mark Cawthra and contained much of the ensemble's live set from the past three years. Tracks included Fortnam's settings of Thomas Hardy's "Shelley's Skylark", Yeats' "He Gives His Beloved Certain Rhymes" and "He Wishes for the Cloths of Heaven", plus new instrumental "Kingstanding" and the part-instrumental/part-choral "Chimes". Other members also contributed material. William D Drake provided "Bill's March" and "Mimnermus in Church" – the latter a Drake setting of a poem by William Johnson Cory with orchestrations by Craig Fortnam – and Sharron and Craig Fortnam co-wrote the folk song "Joy For My Heart".

"It's funny, because for our first album we did a lot of recordings in St Olave's, which is a beautiful, pre-Fire of London church that survived, just behind Trinity Square. And the sound of that record, to me, is like London. It sounds like timeless London to me. Like the Thames, the shingle when the tide goes out. "

— Craig Fortnam contradicts NSRO's "pastoral" image

The album received plenty of critical praise. Word Magazine called it "a beautiful debut.... unreservedly recommended," while Leeds Guide praised "a style of songwriting and a lyricism (nostalgic, pastoral, quaint) which is peculiarly English and suddenly, in their hands, timeless" and their reviewer dubbed the recording "one of the best albums, whatever the genre, that I have heard this year." Playlouder.com claimed that "North Sea Radio Orchestra splash colour into every corner of the speakers with a regal splendour and effervescent celebration of God, Nature or whatever it is you may wish to call it."

In the underground press, Art Rocker praised the NSRO for "doing something really quite special.....in their ability to ebb and sway and permeate through styles without erring away from the constant series of lush orchestrations", and hailed the record as "the most beautiful album of the year… could surely sway even the most ardent distortion-pedal freak to step back and open their minds and hearts to this." Foggy Notions called it "an everchanging trip, blooming with melody and twinkling beauty from start to finish," while Subba Cultcha commented that the ensemble's music was "stepping easily between genres, sometimes classical, sometimes indie; inspired and compelling and often magical, like the soundtrack to a film that hasn't been made yet. It's a thoughtful, melodic and calming record that is sure to attract fans way beyond its classical base." A review in Boomkat (while drawing attention to the NSRO's "idiosyncratic bombast", "cartoonishly baroque melodies" and "unbridled eccentricity") praised the orchestra's "considerable performance skills and elegant arrangements", and concluded that the album was "a fairly surreal experience all round."

=== 2007–2008: Further afield ===
On 26 January 2007 the North Sea Radio Orchestra returned to Bush Hall for another concert (supported again by William D. Drake). On 3 March they played their first concert outside London, at St Michael's Church, Blewbury, Berkshire. This was followed by another appearance at St Giles in the Fields in London on 27 April. On 2 July the NSRO released the 7-inch vinyl-only EP End of Chimes. This featured an edit of the album centrepiece "Chimes" plus three entirely new tracks ("Guitar Miniature No2", "Hurdy Gurdy Miniature", "The Tide Rises the Tide Falls") and was hailed as "a highly entertaining discovery" by Drowned in Sound and as "gentle, lush and frankly beguiling" by SoundsXP.

Later in the year, the NSRO performed two of their highest profile concerts to date – the first being a slot at the Green Man Festival in August, and the second being a performance at the Roundhouse, Chalk Farm, London, on 19 November. In December 2007 the NSRO version of the hymn "O Come O Come Emanuel" appeared on the compilation album The Arctic Circle Presents: That Fuzzy Feeling ( a collection of Christmas songs). The NSRO played live to promote the album at a concert at the Union Chapel, London on 5 December 2007 (alongside Ellis Island Sound, Mara Carlyle, David Julyan and The Dollboy Windpipe Arkestra).

2008 saw the North Sea Radio Orchestra performing more concerts outside London. During the first half of the year they made an appearance at the Jacqueline Du Pre Music Rooms in Oxford in January 2008, and performed at the Friends Meeting House, Brighton on 16 March 2008 supported by Crayola Lectern.

The Brighton concert was notably in that (despite a very positive audience response) it generated the first negative press for the ensemble. The Stool Pigeon criticised the nostalgic quality of the NSRO's music commenting that "it's frequently a fine and lovely thing. But in some ways it can't help feeling like a retreat… Certainly there are moments of beauty, but ultimately it's like stepping back into an alternate, pre-war England where rock'n’roll – not to mention mass industrialisation and immigration – never happened. Which is fine for a night, but I wouldn't want to stay."

Notorious underground music commentator Everett True was considerably more scornful in his Hugs And Kisses blog (reprinted in The Village Voice), castigating the band for "po-faced snobbery" and "baroque warbling" and comparing them unfavourably to their more post-rock inclined support act: “Crayola Lectern tick the same high musicality boxes as the band that followed, sure: but possess one crucial factor that the North Sea Radio Malarkey just don’t, just don’t get. They have heart.” Conversely, Chris Anderson of Crayola Lectern – in his own blogged review of the same concert – described the NSRO as "perfectly formed and rather marvellous... a magnificent creation."

The NSRO played in Malvern in July 2008 (although with only a two-person line-up) and returned in full strength to the Green Man Festival in August. On 27 September 2008 the NSRO performed an "open rehearsal" at the Purcell Room, Southbank Centre, London in a double bill with Ted Barnes. This was part of the Open Weekend event (itself part of the 2008 Cultural Oympiad).

=== 2008: Release of second album Birds ===
A second North Sea Radio Orchestra album – Birds – was released on 1 December 2008 on Oof! Records (with the band performing a concert at St Martin in the Fields on 18 November 2008, to promote it). The album contained a version of previous EP lead track "The Flower" and another long-standing NSRO Tennyson setting, "Move Eastward Happy Earth", plus further settings of poems by Geoffrey Chaucer ("Now Welcom Somer") and William Blake ("The Angel", "A Poison Tree" and "Golden Cage").

Reviews of the album were generally positive. Isle of Man Today described Birds as "effortlessly beautiful to listen to… NSRO manage to take you back centuries to an ancient form of music while retaining an eerie ability to remain thoroughly modern… Birds has a distinctly non-conformist sound but nevertheless achieves its aim with quiet, reserved gusto. NSRO aren't about to go on a media rampage shouting about how good they are; the whole project is far too middle-class for that. But by putting out Birds they are giving their audience a knowing wink. They realise they've created a fine piece of work and you can feel the confidence growing from track to track."

Cambridgeshire Times called the album "an intriguing proposition (which) feels at times like it's just been unearthed from an archaeological dig alongside some ancient flagstones. Organ, violins, clarinet, bassoon and oboe feature heavily alongside acoustic guitar, drum, percussion and choral parts, conjuring up images of royal court musicians… (The album) straddles the less crowded end of 60s folk and revives traditional chamber music, managing to sound timeless and refreshing rather than hopelessly outdated. A calming record of quality musicianship and carefully woven melodies." The review also praised Sharron Fortnam as being "a beguiling embodiment of a cut-glass English Rose singer, delicate, classical, strong and capable."

Reviewing Birds in issue 181, Mojo described the album as sounding like "Tortoise reworked by Howard Goodall" and suggested "there's charm and melody aplenty, but the churchier excursions suggest bourgeois smugness – Blake would not approve." In the underground music press, the Name Someone That's Not A Parasite music blog hailed the NSRO as "(the) band British Sea Power wish they could be! These guys are like a latter day Incredible String Band mess of uniquely Anglican eccentricity." Describing the NSRO's music as "kitchen-sink folk" Subba Cultcha commented that Birds was "something quite magical, but at times cringingly twee and fluffy, but in terms of artistic endeavour, it's a tour-de-force in no uncertain terms. Part classical, part folk, part something entirely new, if you fancy dipping your toe in something a bit different, then this is a great rock pool to do it in."

Organ lavishly praised the album, saying that "North Sea Radio Orchestra are blossoming in a rather fine way now with their inviting mix of delicate English prog and 20th century classical pastoral folk. Harmonically rich and fluid in a Henry Cow, Art Bears, Incredible String Band kind of way... A fine mix of delicate English folk and something that has evolved out of fine traditions of chamber music… Birds is an album pulling gently in two distinct ways. One direction; nice, simple, sitting in a sunny field, female-voiced acoustic folk, the other towards a rarer thing, this fusion of English medieval progressive classical, chamber orchestral music, via Vaughan Williams, Cardiacs, Vernon Elliott, Henry Cow. In the end, it all works as a melodic spirited integral classical whole. Always more than just decorating modern music with classical instrumentation, at its core a real orchestra, this is something that's both timeless and enchantingly beautiful – a very fine, very enjoyable rather magical album."

=== 2009–2010: Selective gigging, Arch Garrison, Vernon Elliott and Leader of the Starry Skies ===
Following the release of Birds, NSRO appearances and activity became rarer, partly due to Craig Fortnam's concentration on a smaller-scale project called Arch Garrison, the live line-up of which also featured James Larcombe. (The project's debut album was released on Double Six/Domino Records in February 2010.)

Despite this, North Sea Radio Orchestra performed several concerts in 2009. On 29 May they performed a free concert in Brixton Library, London, as part of Lambeth Readers and Writers Festival. On 11 July they performed at the 'Les Tombees de la Nuit' Festival in the Opera House in Rennes, Brittany. On 22 October they played at the Union Chapel, London, as part of the Marginalise Concert Series organised by the Arctic Circle label, performing the music of one of their leading influences, Vernon Elliot (arranged by Craig Fortnam and fellow composer Laura Rossi). The playlist featured music from the animated television series The Clangers, Ivor the Engine and Pogles Wood.

In December 2010, an NSRO cover version of the Cardiacs song "March" appeared on Leader of the Starry Skies: A Tribute To Tim Smith, Songbook 1, a fundraising compilation album to benefit the hospitalised Cardiacs leader Tim Smith.

=== 2011–present: Third album I a Moon, Folly Bololey and fourth album Dronne ===
The third North Sea Radio Orchestra album, I a Moon, was released on 4 July 2011. Craig Fortnam composed the music for the album during the winter of 2010/2011, and the album was recorded at various locations in southern England on his laptop computer.

Prior to release, the band announced a number of changes in approach. Firstly, the album would have a "darker, less pastoral sound" with new influences including Krautrock and experimental indie band Deerhoof (and with more emphasis on synthesizer and percussion than previously). Secondly, that there would be a move away from setting poetry in favour of setting self-written lyrics. The band also announced that 'I a Moon' would be released on their own new label, called The Household Mark, on 4 July 2011.

The band also announced a series of live dates for summer 2011, including a repeat performance of the Vernon Elliot music at Kings Place, London, on 10 June, further visits to the Quaker Meeting House in Brighton (10 July) and St Martin-in-the-Fields (15 July) and appearances accompanying indie-folk band Stornoway at the Eastleigh Festival (8 July) and at London's Somerset House (9 July).

When former Henry Cow member John Greaves asked Max Marchini of Italy-based Dark Companion Records if the label would be interested in producing a live concert and accompanying album, Craig Fortnam was asked to create a new arrangement of the songs from Robert Wyatt's classic Rock Bottom. These were performed later in 2017 in Lyon as the Folly Bololey - Songs from Robert Wyatt's "Rock Bottom" concert featuring Greaves, the NSRO and Italian singer Annie Barbazza. Marchini subsequently produced the critically acclaimed album version of Folly Bololey, recorded live during the Musiche Nuove a Piacenza Festival in November 2018 and eventually released in 2019, with liner notes written by Robert Wyatt and Jonathan Coe.

In September 2016 - prior to the performance and release of the Folly Bololey concert and album - North Sea Radio Orchestra released their fourth album, Dronne. It was described by Prog magazine as being "particularly inspired" and like "a core sample drilled down through the last few hundred years of music, revealing traces of Purcell, Victorian parlour music, Britten, sea shanties, and krautrock." Craig Fortnam noted that his preceding work on Folly Bololey had informed the approach of Dronne by teaching him how to "(tread) the fine line between spontaneity and composition whilst maintaining a sense of freedom within the original arrangements." The album featured another cover of a Robert Wyatt song, "The British Road".

On 2 January 2019, North Sea Radio Orchestra released Gap Species, a collection of early and rare recordings from 1998 to 2006, through Bandcamp. Further Folly Bololey concerts followed in the same year in London and France.

== Ensemble members ==
Dates are rough approximations based on releases.

=== Current ===
- Craig Fortnam – guitar, keyboards, MIDI, bass guitar, organ, piano, vocals, percussion, synth (1998–present)
- Harry Escott – cello (1998–present)
- Luke Crookes – bassoon (1998–present)
- James Larcombe – organ, piano, synth, hurdy gurdy, keyboards (1998–2016, 2025–present)
- Nicola Baigent – clarinet, flute (2006–present)
- Brian Wright – violin, viola (2006–2016, 2025–present)
- Chantelle Pike – vocals (2025–present)

=== Former ===
- Sharron Fortnam – vocals (1998–2016)
- Nick Hayes – clarinet (1998–2006)
- Daniel Hewson – trombone (1998–2006)
- Hugh Wilkinson-Hunt – vibes, percussion (1998–2016)
- Geraldine Peach – oboe (1998–2008)
- Jen Underhill – violin (1998–2006)
- Terry Pitt – violin (1998–2006)
- Ben Davies – piano, organ (2006–2011)
- Richard Larcombe – vocals, guitar (2006)
- Dug Parker – voice (2006–2016)
- Sarah Longe – violin (2008)
- William D. Drake – piano, organ, vocal (2019)
- Tommasso Franguelli – vibes, percussion (2019)
- Cheb Nettles – drums (2019)
- Laurent Valero – violin, viola, recorder, bass recorder (2019)

=== North Sea Chorus ===
- Drake (2006–2008)
- Louise Harrison (2006–2008)
- Suzy Kirby (2006–2008)
- Gideon Miller (2006–2008)
- Kavus Torabi (2006–2008)
- Melanie Woods (2006–2008)
- Davies (2006–2008)
- S. Fortnam (2006)
- R. Larcombe (2006–2008)
- Parker (2006)
- Peach (2006)
- Luke Albery (2008)
- J. Larcombe (2008)

=== Lineups ===
| Period | Members | Release |
|---|---|---|
| 1998–2006 | Craig Fortnam – guitar, keyboards, MIDI; Sharron Fortnam – vocals; Nick Hayes – clarinet; Daniel Hewson – trombone; Harry Escott – cello; Hugh Wilkinson – percussion; Luke Crookes – bassoon; Geri Peach – oboe; James Larcombe – organ; Jen Underhill – violin; Terry Pitt – trumpet | Gap Species (2019) |
| 2006 | Nicola Baigent – Bb clarinet/bass clarinet; Crookes – bassoon; Ben Davies – piano; Escott – cello; C. Fortnam – guitar, bass guitar, organ; S. Fortnam – lead voice; J. Larcombe – piano, organ; Richard Larcombe – voice; Dug Parker – voice; Peach – oboe; Underhill – violin; Wilkinson – percussion; Brian Wright – violin; North Sea Chorus: William D. Drake; Louise Harrison; Suzy Kirby; Gideon Miller; Kavus Torabi; Melanie Woods; Davies; S. Fortnam; R. Larcombe; Parker; Peach | North Sea Radio Orchestra (2006) |
| 2008 | Baigent – clarinet; Crookes – bassoon; Davies – piano, chamber organ; Escott – cello; C. Fortnam – guitar, chamber organ, piano, voice; S. Fortnam – lead voice; J. Larcombe – monosynth. chamber organ; Sarah Longe – violin; Parker – voice; Peach – oboe; Wilkinson – percussion; Wright – violin; North Sea Chorus: Luke Albery; Davies; Drake; Harrison; Kirby; J. Larcombe; R. Larcombe; Miller; Torabi; Woods | Birds (2008) |
| 2011 | Baigent – clarinet and bass clarinet; Crookes – bassoon; Davies – piano and organ; Escott – cello; C. Fortnam – guitar, voice, organ and percussion; S. Fortnam – lead voice; J. Larcombe – monosynth, organ and hurdy gurdy; Parker – voice; Wilkinson – percussion; Wright – violin and viola | I a Moon (2011) |
| 2016 | Baigent – Bb/bass clarinet; Crookes – bassoon; Escott – cello; C. Fortnam – guitars, organ, synth, percussion, vocals; S. Fortnam – vocals; J. Larcombe – piano, organ, synth; Parker – voice; Wilkinson-Hunt – vibes, percussion; Wright – violin, viola | Drone (2016) |
| 2019 | Baigent – Bb/bass clarinet, spoken word; Crookes – bassoon; Drake – piano, Farfisa organ, vocal; Escott – cello; C. Fortnam – guitar, Farfisa organ, vocal; Tommasso Franguelli – vibes, percussion; Cheb Nettles – drums; Laurent Valero – violin, viola, recorder, bass recorder | Folly Bololey (Songs from Robert Wyatt's Rock Bottom) (2019) |
| 2025 | Baigent – Bb and bass clarinet, flute; Crookes – bassoon; Escott – cello; C. Fortnam – vocals, guitars, bass guitar, piano, organ, synth, percussion; J. Larcombe – piano, various keyboards, hurdy gurdy; Chantelle Pike – vocals; Wright – violin and viola | Special Powers (2025) |

== Musical connections ==
- Craig Fortnam also plays in Arch Garrison with NSRO bandmate James Larcombe. Craig and Sharron Fortnam occasionally played acoustic alternative pop with William D. Drake under the name of The fFortingtons. He is currently the percussionist for Cardiacs.
- After leaving North Sea Radio Orchestra, Sharron Fortnam set up and led the experimental pop band Kugelschreiber. She is also a member of Cardiacs and Lost Crowns, and has worked with Kev Hopper, Led Bib, William D. Drake, Article 54 and others.
- William D. Drake is a former member of Cardiacs, Nervous, and Wood, and maintains a solo career as both songwriter and underground classical pianist
- Harry Escott is a composer who has had pieces commissioned by Westminster Cathedral Choir, The Fitzwilliam String Quartet and The Chamber Ensemble of London, in addition to his work in film, TV and theatre. In collaboration with Molly Nyman, he has composed music for (among others) Hard Candy, Channel 4's Poppy Shakespeare and Michael Winterbottom's A Mighty Heart and Road To Guantanamo. His film music is performed by his own group, The Samphire Band, in which Craig Fortnam plays guitar.
- Richard and James Larcombe work together as Stars in Battledress and are frequent collaborators with William D. Drake. Richard has also worked as Defeat The Young and Lost Crowns, and is the former frontman of Magnilda.
- Kavus Torabi is the leader of Knifeworld (in which Craig Fortnam previously played bass), the current guitarist for both Guapo and Gong, and a former member of The Monsoon Bassoon and Cardiacs. He has also worked with Spider Stacy (The Pogues), Chrome Hoof and Mediaeval Baebes.
- Kavus Torabi and Richard and James Larcombe are all members of sea shanty band Admirals Hard.
- Melanie Woods is a member of Sidi Bou Said and also sings in Knifeworld.
- Luke Albery is also the frontman of the rock band Footsteps And Voices.
- Luke Crookes works with the Philharmonia Orchestra (London) and has recorded for Olympia Records: he is also a music educator and animator.
- Sara Longe is also a member of the Ebony Ensemble.
- Brian Wright is a member of Instrumental, a string sextet who perform extensively at contemporary music festivals in Europe, covering the music of electronic acts such as Orbital, Brian Eno, and Moby.
- Sara Longe, Suzy Kirby, Harry Escott, Ben Davies and Sharron Fortnam have all worked with Wildhearts songwriter Ginger (on the Yoni album).

== Discography ==
Studio albums

- North Sea Radio Orchestra (2006, Oof! Records)
- Birds (2008, Oof! Records)
- I a Moon (2011, The Household Mark)
- Dronne (2016, The Household Mark)
- Special Powers (2025, Believers Roast)

Collaborative albums

- Folly Bololey (Songs from Robert Wyatt's Rock Bottom) (with John Greaves and Annie Barbazzo) (2019, Dark Companion)

Compilation albums

- Gap Species (2019, The Household Mark)

Singles and EPs

- "North Sea Radio Orchestra" (2003, private release)
- "The Flower" (2005, Oof! Records)
- "The End of Chimes" (2007, Oof! Records)

Compilation appearances

- Folk Off: New Folk and Psychedelia from the British Isles and North America (2006, Sunday Best Recordings – NSRO contributes “Guitar Miniature”)
- The Arctic Circle Presents: That Fuzzy Feeling (2007, Arctic Circle Records – NSRO contributes “O Come O Come Emanuel”)
- Mojo Presents: The Wall Re-Built! (Disc Two) (2009, Mojo Magazine – NSRO contributes “Vera/Bring the Boys Back Home”)
- Leader of the Starry Skies: A Tribute to Tim Smith, Songbook 1 (2011 – Believers Roast – NSRO contributes "March")
