= I a Moon =

Studio album by North Sea Radio Orchestra
- Released: 2011
- Genre: Classical music
- Label: The Household Mark
- Producer: Craig Fortnam

North Sea Radio Orchestra chronology
| Birds (2008) | I a Moon (2011) | Dronne (2016) |

I a Moon (Note: Stylised in sentence case) is the third album by the English cross-disciplinary music ensemble North Sea Radio Orchestra (NSRO). It was released on July 4, 2011, on the Household Mark label.

== Background ==
I a Moon was the first NSRO album to be produced in full by the group leader Craig Fortnam, who composed the music for the album during the winter of 2010/2011. The album was recorded, edited and mixed at various locations in southern England on Fortnam's laptop computer, apparently following an unsuccessful attempt to record it in the "live" manner of the two previous albums.

The album reflects several changes in approach for the NSRO, with Fortnam attempting to steer the project away from its cosy reputation. He has commented, "I got a bit tired of reading reviews of [the NSRO's music] 'tolling through the sunlit glades' and all that. People have accused us of being twee, and if you only like The Ramones then we probably do sound fairly twee, that's fine. But I always think it has a certain darkness that saves it from that, personally." Early press releases highlighted the album's "darker, less pastoral sound", announced new influences including Krautrock and the experimental indie band Deerhoof, and revealed that the band's music would now have more emphasis on synthesizer and percussion than previously. This was the first album by the band without its choral vocal section, the North Sea Chorus.

The second change of approach was a move away from the Victorian and Edwardian poetry settings of the first two albums in favour of Fortnam writing his own lyrics. Fortnam has commented that "I think I was slightly aware that I was removing myself a little bit [previously]. Why cut down an avenue of self-expression? I was aware of that for the first time, really." This also resulted in a darker musical and lyrical tone, which Fortnam revealed "touches on tragic things that I've experienced, and that brings on more profound feelings." One of the major inspirations of the work was the plight of Fortnam's friend and mentor Tim Smith, who was incapacitated by a heart attack and series of strokes in 2008.

I a Moon was the first album to be released independently on Craig and Sharron Fortnam's own new label, The Household Mark.

== Critical reception ==
Initial critical responses to I a Moon was positive. The Rock Club compared the album to the work of Joanna Newsom, Julianna Barwick and The Leisure Society and commented on its "significant charm". BBC Review's Gary Mulholland hailed it as "the world's first baroque-Krautrock-folk-rock-Michael Nyman-madrigal-Kate Bush-electro-pop album" and as being "genuinely very beautiful." He also commented that "North Sea Radio Orchestra really should be smug, boring and irrelevant. So how do they make this stuff so exciting?... The words throughout the album feel like the thoughts of someone so outside of the real world that they can hover above themselves, watching their own futile attempts to connect, like a child watching ants and pondering whether to drown them. This alienated, superior feel is contrasted by the sheer beauty of Craig Fortnam's melodies, which have that knack of suddenly shifting to the one chord available that can make spines tingle and toes curl with pleasure. Meanwhile, the arrangements wear their classical and ancient folk influences so lightly that a track like "Berliner Luft" can find itself sounding like Neu! without need of drums nor electric guitars."

== Track listing ==
All music written by Craig Fortnam except where noted. All arrangements by Craig Fortnam. Lyricists as credited.

1. Morpheus Miracle Maker (lyrics by Craig Fortnam) (5:21)
2. I a Moon (lyrics by Sharron Fortnam) (2:23)
3. Guitar Miniature #3 (1:42)
4. Heavy Weather (lyrics by Craig Fortnam/Sharron Fortnam) (8:09)
5. Berliner Luft (6:11)
6. Morpheus Drone (2:25)
7. The Earth Beneath Our Feet (lyrics by Craig Fortnam) (5:31)
8. Ring Moonlets (3:22)
9. When Things Fall Apart (lyrics by Craig Fortnam/Sharron Fortnam) (4:31)
10. Mitte Der Welt (6:08)

== Personnel ==
North Sea Radio Orchestra:

- Craig Fortnam: nylon-string acoustic guitar, chamber organ, percussion, vocals
- Sharron Fortnam: lead vocals (soprano)
- Dug Parker: vocals (main harmonies)
- James Larcombe: monosynth, chamber organ, hurdy-gurdy
- Ben Davies: piano, chamber organ
- Nicola Baigent: clarinet, bass clarinet
- Luke Crookes: bassoon
- Harry Escott: cello
- Brian Wright: violin, viola
- Hugh Wilkinson: percussion

with

- Matt Shmigelsky: extra bells
- Sarah Cutts, Jo Spratley: backing vocals on "'Morpheus Miracle Maker"
