= Birds (North Sea Radio Orchestra album) =

Studio album by North Sea Radio Orchestra
- Released: 1 December 2008
- Studios: Real World, Wiltshire; Apollo 8, Wiltshire; Foma, London
- Genre: Classical music
- Length: 41:11
- Label: Oof!
- Producer: Mark Cawthra

North Sea Radio Orchestra chronology
North Sea Radio Orchestra (2006)	Birds (2008)	I a Moon (2011)

Birds is the second album by the English cross-disciplinary musical ensemble North Sea Radio Orchestra. It was released on 1 December 2008, on Oof! Records.

== Background ==
Birds was a continuation of the work begun on the ensemble's first album, North Sea Radio Orchestra, consisting almost entirely of original compositions and containing settings of antique poetry from the Victorian and Edwardian eras and earlier. As with the previous album, Birds contained settings of poems by Thomas Hardy ("The Wound" and "Phantom") and Alfred, Lord Tennyson ("The Flower" and "Move Eastward Happy Earth", both of which had been in the repertoire of the ensemble since its earliest concerts in 2002). Birds expanded the band's choice of poetry for setting choice by including settings of Geoffrey Chaucer ("Now Welcom Somer") and William Blake ("The Angel", "A Poison Tree" and "Golden Cage"). Almost all of the music was written by group leader Craig Fortnam with the exception of "Personent Hodie" (a Fortnam arrangement of a traditional tune) and "Harbour Wall", which was a Fortnam arrangement of a composition by William D. Drake (the original of which had appeared as a solo piano performance on Drake's 2007 album Yews Paw).

The band performed a concert at St Martin in the Fields on 18 November 2008 to promote the release of Birds.

One album track, "The Flower", had previously been released as the first track on a 7-inch vinyl EP.

== Critical reception ==
Professional ratings
Review scores
Source	Rating
Allmusic	(unrated) link

Reviews of the album were generally positive. Isle Of Man Today described Birds as "effortlessly beautiful to listen to… NSRO manage to take you back centuries to an ancient form of music while retaining an eerie ability to remain thoroughly modern… Birds has a distinctly non-conformist sound but nevertheless achieves its aim with quiet, reserved gusto. NSRO aren't about to go on a media rampage shouting about how good they are; the whole project is far too middle-class for that. But by putting out Birds they are giving their audience a knowing wink. They realise they've created a fine piece of work and you can feel the confidence growing from track to track."

The Cambridgeshire Times called the album "an intriguing proposition [which] feels at times like it's just been unearthed from an archaeological dig alongside some ancient flagstones. Organ, violins, clarinet, bassoon and oboe feature heavily alongside acoustic guitar, drum, percussion and choral parts, conjuring up images of royal court musicians… [The album] straddles the less crowded end of 60s folk and revives traditional chamber music, managing to sound timeless and refreshing rather than hopelessly outdated. A calming record of quality musicianship and carefully woven melodies." The review also praised Sharron Fortnam as being "a beguiling embodiment of a cut-glass English Rose singer, delicate, classical, strong and capable."

Reviewing Birds in issue 181, Mojo described the album as sounding like "Tortoise reworked by Howard Goodall" and suggested "there's charm and melody aplenty, but the churchier excursions suggest bourgeois smugness - Blake would not approve." In the underground music press, the Name Someone That’s Not A Parasite music blog hailed the NSRO as "(the) band British Sea Power wish they could be! These guys are like a latter day Incredible String Band mess of uniquely Anglican eccentricity." Describing the NSRO’s music as "kitchen-sink folk" Subba Cultcha commented that Birds was "something quite magical, but at times cringingly twee and fluffy, but in terms of artistic endeavour, it’s a tour-de-force in no uncertain terms. Part classical, part folk, part something entirely new, if you fancy dipping your toe in something a bit different, then this is a great rock pool to do it in."

Organ lavishly praised the album, saying that "North Sea Radio Orchestra are blossoming in a rather fine way now with their inviting mix of delicate English prog and 20th century classical pastoral folk. Harmonically rich and fluid in a Henry Cow, Art Bears, Incredible String Band kind of way... A fine mix of delicate English folk and something that has evolved out of fine traditions of chamber music… Birds is an album pulling gently in two distinct ways. One direction; nice, simple, sitting in a sunny field, female-voiced acoustic folk, the other towards a rarer thing, this fusion of English medieval progressive classical, chamber orchestral music, via Vaughan Williams, Cardiacs, Vernon Elliott, Henry Cow. In the end, it all works as a melodic spirited integral classical whole. Always more than just decorating modern music with classical instrumentation, at its core a real orchestra, this is something that’s both timeless and enchantingly beautiful – a very fine, very enjoyable rather magical album."

== Track listing ==
All music is composed by Craig Fortnam except where noted.

No.	Title	Lyrics	Music	Length
1.	"The Angel"	William Blake		2:12
2.	"The Wound"	Thomas Hardy		3:54
3.	"Copt Gliders"			4:48
4.	"Move Eastward Happy Earth"	Alfred Tennyson		4:07
5.	"A Poison Tree"	Blake		2:15
6.	"The Flower"	Tennyson		3:53
7.	"Harbour Wall"		William D. Drake; Fortnam	3:57
8.	"Guitar Miniature"			1:21
9.	"Phantom"	Hardy		2:10
10.	"Personent Hodie"		trad.; Fortnam	3:24
11.	"Now Welcom Somer"	Geoffrey Chaucer		6:14
12.	"Golden Cage"	Blake		2:47

== Personnel ==
North Sea Radio Orchestra:

- Craig Fortnam – nylon-string acoustic guitar, chamber organ, piano, vocals
- Sharron Fortnam – lead vocals (soprano)
- Dug Parker – vocals (main harmonies)
- James Larcombe – monosynth, chamber organ
- Ben Davies – piano, chamber organ
- Nicola Baigent – clarinet
- Geraldine Peach – oboe
- Luke Crookes – bassoon
- Harry Escott – cello
- Sarah Longe, Brian Wright – violins
- Hugh Wilkinson – percussion

North Sea Radio Chorus:

- Luke Albery, Ben Davies, William D. Drake, Louise Harrison, Suzy Kirby, James Larcombe, Richard Larcombe, Gideon Miller, Kavus Torabi, Melanie Woods
