= Mimnermus in Church =

Mimnermus in Church is a poem written by William Johnson Cory.

== Background ==
William Johnson was an Eton College master and author of the lyrics to the "Eton Boating Song". He left Eton under suspicion of improper relations with students and added "Cory" to his name. He published a volume of homoerotic verse called Ionica. Mimnermus in Church contrasts the warm delights of actual life with the cold joys of a merely promised heaven.

Richard Ollard wrote that the poem "expresses [Cory's] view of life better than anyone else can."

== Text ==
You promise heavens free from strife,
Pure truth, and perfect change of will;
But sweet, sweet is this human life,
So sweet, I fain would breathe it still;
Your chilly stars I can forgo,
This warm kind world is all I know.

You say there is no substance here,
One great reality above:
Back from that void I shrink in fear,
And child-like hide myself in love:
Show me what angels feel. Till then
I cling, a mere weak man, to men.

You bid me lift my mean desires
From faltering lips and fitful veins
To sexless souls, ideal quires,
Unwearied voices, wordless strains:
My mind with fonder welcome owns
One dear dead friend's remember'd tones.

Forsooth the present we must give
To that which cannot pass away;
All beauteous things for which we live
By laws of time and space decay.
But O, the very reason why
I clasp them, is because they die.

== Song setting ==
This poem was set to music (circa 1994) by the English songwriter and composer William D. Drake and performed by his psychedelic acoustic band, Lake Of Puppies. The setting was later given a fuller orchestration by Lake of Puppies member Craig Fortnam and was taken into the repertoire of the chamber ensemble North Sea Radio Orchestra (in which both Drake and Fortnam performed, with the former Lake of Puppies singer and bass guitarist Sharon Fortnam). Writing in The Guardian, John L. Water described the arrangement as "ha[ving] a languorous, grandiose quality reminiscent of The Blue Nile."

A recording of the North Sea Radio Orchestra version of the song is on the ensemble's first album, North Sea Radio Orchestra, released in 2006.

== See also ==
- Mimnermus
