= Shrubbies =

English pop group

- Left to right: Sharron Saddington, Dominic Luckman, Sarah Smith, and Craig Fortnam.

Background information
- Also known as: Shrubby Veronica
- Origin: London, England
- Genres: Psychedelic pop; indie rock
- Years active: 1996–1999 (Note: Descriptions of the North Sea Radio Orchestra album Gap Species suggest that Shrubbies dissolved in 1998.)
- Label: Merlin Audio
- Spinoffs: North Sea Radio Orchestra
- Spinoff of: Lake of Puppies
- Past members: Sharron Saddington; Craig Fortnam; Sarah Smith; Ben Clarke; Dominic Luckman; Dan Maitland

The Shrubbies were an English pop group from London, active from 1996 to 1999. The band was formed as Shrubby Veronica by Craig Fortnam (vocalist and guitarist), Sharron Saddington (vocalist and bass guitarist) and the former Cardiacs members Sarah Smith (vocals, saxophone, keyboards) and Dominic Luckman (drums). They gigged enthusiastically in London for several years and then split up as Fortnam was disillusioned with playing the traditional indie rock toilet circuit.

Fortnam had a chance meeting with William D. Drake which led to him joining Drake's band, Lake of Puppies, with Saddington. Fortnam and Saddington fell in love, forming the Shrubbies with Smith and Luckman. The band released an eponymous EP, The Shrubbies, in 1997 and the album Memphis in Texas in 1999. Fortnam and Saddington later married and recruited musicians associated with Cardiacs to form the North Sea Radio Orchestra.

== History ==
After playing bass guitar in a jazz fusion band, Craig Fortnam had a chance meeting with the former Cardiacs member William D. Drake, which led to him joining Drake's post-Cardiacs psychedelic pop combo Lake of Puppies with Sharron Saddington. Fortnam fell in love with Saddington, and the couple formed the Shrubbies alongside former Cardiacs and Sea Nymphs member Sarah Smith on saxophone and keyboards, and Ben Clarke on drums. Former Cardiacs drummer Dominic Luckman joined the fold when Clarke left the band. The pop group, initially called Shrubby Veronica, originated from London in 1996, with their Myspace page giving the location of Wallington. They gigged enthusiastically in London and beyond, supporting a headlining gig by Huge Baby and playing concerts with like-minded bands the Monsoon Bassoon, Podsdarapomuk and Delicate AWOL. Following Sarah's departure from the band (prior to 8 March 1999), Dan Maitland signed up on saxophone and keyboards. The Shrubbies, with Maitland, were confirmed as support for Cardiacs' June 1999 tour.

I began to realise that most people were there for a social thing, and people were talking all the way through. That just started annoying me and I thought, 'I'll write music that doesn't have drums, that isn't loud, and we’ll play places where people sit down and then they won’t talk.'

— Craig Fortnam to The Stool Pigeon

Though the collaboration was creatively rewarding for Fortnam, he became disillusioned with playing the traditional indie rock toilet circuit. Fortnam was annoyed the poor etiquette and atmosphere he encountered at concerts, so the band split up in 1999. Following their dissolution, Fortnam went to Dartington College to study composition and decided he "wanted to be Stravinsky", married Saddington and like-minded musicians associated with Cardiacs and classical connections to form the North Sea Radio Orchestra, with Sharron on lead vocals.

Shrubbies, featuring Dominic Luckman, were set to specially reform for the Alphabet Business Convention at the Salisbury Arts Centre on 26 August 2017, but were replaced by the band Prescott on the revised bill.

== Discography ==
The Shrubbies' discography was produced by Cardiacs frontman Tim Smith and released though the record label Merlin Audio. The songs were recorded at Apollo 8 in Chessington, Surrey and Purple Studios in Norwich, Norfolk. The music has been described as folk-pronk and folk prog by Misfit City and Ondarock respectively, and their releases have been categorised as acoustic pop, baroque pop, electroacoustic folk, folk baroque, psychedelic folk, psychedelic pop and psychedelic rock. A four-track EP released in 1997 and the album Memphis in Texas in 1999 following the dissolution.

=== The Shrubbies EP ===
The Shrubbies

EP by the Shrubbies
- Released: 20 September 1997
- Studio: Apollo 8 (Chessington)
- Length: 15:27
- Label: Merlin Audio
- Producer: Tim Smith

Shrubbies chronology
| The Shrubbies (1997) | Memphis in Texas (1999) |

A self-titled EP featuring a selection of songs from Memphis in Texas was released by Merlin Audio on 20 September 1997, exclusively on CD. Misfit City described the tracks as "four complex and leaping songs, swinging through an adventure playground of sophisticated eccentric harmony based around Craig’s dextrous gut-strung acoustic guitars and Sharron’s fluffy chirrup", praising Sarah Smith's saxophone and keyboard riffs.

==== Track listing ====
All lyrics are written by Sharron Saddington except "Sabled Fur" by Craig Fortnam; all music is composed by Fortnam.

| No. | Title | Length |
|---|---|---|
| 1. | "Carefree Clothes" | 3:31 |
| 2. | "Body Cried Alive" | 4:13 |
| 3. | "Perfect Present" | 4:08 |
| 4. | "Sabled Fur" | 3:26 |
| Total length: | | 15:27 |

==== Personnel ====
Credits adapted from The Shrubbies EP liner notes.

Shrubbies

- Sharron Saddington – vocals, bass guitar
- Dominic Luckman – drums
- Sarah Smith – vocals, saxaphone [sic], keyboards
- Craig Fortnam – vocals, guitar

Additional musicians

- Tim Smith – handclaps on "Perfect Present"
- Rob Deschamps – French horn on "Carefree Clothes"

Technical

- Tim Smith – production
- Matthew Cutts – photography
- John Whitehouse – digital mastering

=== Memphis in Texas ===
Memphis in Texas

Studio album by Shrubbies
- Released: 1999
- Studio: Apollo 8 (Chessington); Purple Studios (Norwich)
- Length: 46:03
- Label: Merlin Audio
- Producer: Tim Smith

Shrubbies chronology
| The Shrubbies (1997) | Memphis in Texas (1999) |

The Shubbies' lone album was released on CD by Merlin Audio in 1999. Memphis in Texas (stylised in all lowercase) was reissued on Bandcamp on 11 September 2011.

==== Track listing ====
All lyrics are written by Sharron Saddington except "Sabled Fur" by Craig Fortnam; all music is composed by Fortnam.

| No. | Title | Vocal | Length |
|---|---|---|---|
| 1. | "My Shoulder Ride" | Sharron | 2:55 |
| 2. | "No Sounds" | Sharron; Craig | 2:21 |
| 3. | "Body Cried Alive" | Sharron | 4:15 |
| 4. | "Sabled Fur" | Craig | 3:30 |
| 5. | "Twiddle Your Thumbs Mum" | Sharron | 2:00 |
| 6. | "Carefree Clothes" | Sarah | 3:31 |
| 7. | "Visitors' Book" | Sharron | 3:50 |
| 8. | "Memphis in Texas" | Sharron; Craig | 7:42 |
| 9. | "Perfect Present" | Sharron | 4:09 |
| 10. | "Hearty Connection" | Sharron | 5:07 |
| 11. | "Knives" | Sharron | 6:43 |
| Total length: | | | 46:03 |

- Adapted from Bandcamp.

==== Personnel ====
Adapted from the Memphis in Texas liner notes.

Shrubbies

- Sharron Saddington (Note: Saddington is credited as "Sharron Fortnam" on Bandcamp, following her marriage to Craig.) – vocals, bass guitar
- Dominic Luckman – drums, percussion
- Sarah Smith – vocals, saxophone, keyboard, Hammond organ, cello
- Craig Fortnam – vocals, guitars, keyboard, harmonium

Additional musicians

- Tim Smith – handclaps on "Perfect Present"
- Rob Deschamps – French horn on "Carefree Clothes"
- The Inkling Quartet – strings on "Hearty Connection"

Technical

- Jonnie Hamilton – photography
- Big Faluda Productions (Ian Johnson) – design
- Tim Smith – production
