= The Monsoon Bassoon =

English rock band

- The Monsoon Bassoon in 1999

Background information
- Origin: Leyton, East London, England
- Genres: Psychedelic rock; math rock; art punk
- Years active: 1995–2001
- Labels: Org; Weird Neighbourhood
- Spinoffs: Miss Helsinki; Authority; Hatchjaw and Bassett
- Spinoff of: Die Laughing; Squid Squad
- Past members: Kavus Torabi; Dan Chudley; Sarah Measures; Laurie Osborne; Jamie Frazer Keddie

The Monsoon Bassoon were an English independent rock band active between 1995 and 2001, notable for their exceptionally complex and energetic music. During their lifespan, the band won the NME's Single Of The Week award three times (for three consecutive single releases). They were an integral part of the "London math-rock" scene of the late 1990s and had a passionate underground following, particularly inspiring other bands.

== Sound ==
The Monsoon Bassoon's music (largely created by guitarists Kavus Torabi and Dan Chudley) can be described as psychedelic rock or math rock (the band themselves sometimes used the tongue-in-cheek term "lysergic funk"). Their music drew on a variety of other sources including British and American art rock, heavy metal, folk music, avant-garde music, New York minimalism and progressive rock.

Although the results sounded chaotic or confusing to some ears, the music was in fact carefully planned. Bass player Laurie Osbourne has commented "every note was very worked out and there wasn't much repetition." Kavus Torabi asserts "The music was co-written (by me) with Dan Chudley, and although we pretty much knew how we wanted the tunes to go before they were presented to the rest of the group, the songs would always be open to a few arrangement changes when we all worked on them."

The band were all highly skilled and disciplined musicians capable of precise and detailed performances, which enabled them to play highly complex material. Regular features of Monsoon Bassoon songs were male and female harmony vocals, swapping of the lead singer role, woodwind parts, polyrhythmic sections, time changes and unusual scales. At times, all of the band might appear to be playing in different timings, before locking into a crescendo. Another feature of the band was the use of stylistic shifts within songs and sudden changes in direction or mood.

The band cited a broad range of influences including Henry Cow, Cardiacs, Shudder To Think, XTC and Steve Reich. However, Osbourne has commented "we loved... all kinds of experimental rock; but we always really wanted to make pop music, experimental pop music." The band's output was notably melodic, and catchy enough for their singles to receive attention and outright praise.

== History ==
=== Prehistory (1988–1993) ===
Kavus Torabi and Dan Chudley (both guitarists and singers) met in their mutual hometown of Plymouth, Devon, UK and first worked together in 1988 in the psychedelic thrash-metal band Die Laughing, in which the two developed a tightly integrated and interlocking guitar style. After Die Laughing split in 1993, Chudley formed the band Squid Squad in which he played with singing flute player/clarinettist Sarah Measures and drummer Jamie Keddie. Torabi, Chudley, Measures and Keddie (along with bass player Laurie Osbourne) all relocated to Leyton, East London in 1994 and formed The Monsoon Bassoon.

=== Early days, Redoubtable and In Bold Gardens (1994–1997) ===
Early gigs and recordings brought the Monsoon Bassoon to the attention of Organ magazine and Org Records, who issued their first release - (the cassette EP Redoubtable) in 1995. The band briefly went into hiatus later that year following the departure of Jamie Keddie to the eccentric Britpop group Octopus. However, he was persuaded to return in early 1996 and the band began a new lease of life.

In 1997, The Monsoon Bassoon began recording material for their debut album, with Tim Smith (Cardiacs) as producer. Several of these tracks were released in early 1998 on a demo cassette called In Bold Gardens which received limited circulation and a handful of reviews. By this time the band were developing a strong reputation on the London underground scene thanks to their powerful live act, now focussed into tighter songs, and had played on concert bills with Nub and Sidi Bou Said.

=== The year of breakthrough singles (1998) ===
Monsoon Bassoon manager John Fowers had now set up Weird Neighbourhood Records in order to issue Monsoon Bassoon recordings. The label's first release was the debut Monsoon Bassoon single, the double A-side Wise Guy/28 Days In Rocket Ship. Much to the band's astonishment, this was awarded Single of the Week in New Musical Express. Laurie Osbourne later recalled "we had a really trendy moment where for some reason the NME started getting into progressive music. There was a writer called Simon Williams who runs Fierce Panda who discovered Coldplay, Super Furry Animals and so on, and he was really into us, so we had a moment of strange trendiness in amidst eight years of terminal untrendiness, you know?"

Kavus Torabi remembers that "it really kick-started an interest in the band. I love that it was completely on our own terms, it doesn't sound like anything else. It's such an improbable song, but it couldn't have been any other way. When it really started to come together in rehearsals there was a total feeling of magic between the five members of the band. I think we couldn't believe we had harnessed a song that good. I hope that doesn't sound too arrogant. It was a really potent time. I think it was one of those rare moments I felt truly alive and in the here and now. I still get a funny knot in my stomach when I hear it."

The next single, In The Iceman's Back Garden, was another NME Single of the Week and was received with similar enthusiasm in the underground press. Reviewing it, Robots And Electronic Brains described the Monsoon Bassoon as "the kind of band that Organ were calling pronk all those years ago: proggy bombast and stylistic excess welded to punk energy, thrill and speed. No two consecutive bars are the same, the total antithesis of bands like Tortoise or Mogwai, there's loads of fiddly bits, a fidgetful beat, tons of influences and an archly British, eccentric theatrical edge... It's a beauteous noise and an education your ears will thank you for."

The third Monsoon Bassoon single, The King Of Evil, was NME Single of the Week once again. Reviewing it, NME's Stevie Chick concluded "Slightly hamstrung by more than a few things, notably the fact that they don't live in Glasgow, they aren't on Digital Hardcore, they look like Club Dog roadies, they are completely and utterly skint and they have the lumpiest band name since Frottage Bunion, the fivesome nevertheless persist in making the most amazing alternative music...the most gorgeous, grotesque, explosive outbursts of noise witnessed since the madder bits of 'Come on Die Young' came round and ruined our woofers. Key words? Psychotic. Lunging. Lithe. Panthers in the back garden. Hair-raising, in every sense of the word."

The band rounded off their most successful year to date by supporting their longtime heroes Cardiacs at the Garage, London, on 4 December, followed by a concert with Rothko, Nightnurse and an embryonic Snow Patrol at the Camden Underworld on 15 December and a support slot for The Clint Boon Experience on 17 December at the Bull and Gate, Kentish Town.

=== I Dig Your Voodoo (1999) ===
The Monsoon Bassoon were, by now, at the epicentre of the loosely defined London math-rock scene. Centred around relatively small venues such as the Dublin Castle and Upstairs at the Garage, this featured London-based bands such as Billy Mahonie, Guapo, Rothko, Nub, Delicate AWOL, Geiger Counter (later Foe) and the Shrubbies, plus affiliated acts such as the Oxford-based Nought and developing indie acts such as Seafood.

The band's first (and only) album, I Dig Your Voodoo, arrived in 1999. Like the singles, it was released on Weird Neighbourhood Records. It received reviews in the mainstream press in publications as disparate as The Guardian, Heat, and NME. The latter, giving the album eight points out of ten, said "it is with longing arms that we clutch The Monsoon Bassoon close to our heavy bosom. They have come with a malicious intent to bludgeon all musical preconceptions into mush. And they will, ultimately, tug hard on your heartstrings in ways that you won't quite understand. It's all in the delivery. I Dig Your Voodoo... is psychedelic pop that has been hung, drawn and quartered only to be dipped into an acid pickle and served with a liberal helping of punk rock angst... Every spurt of sonic agitation is brimful of intent." Comparing the music to Nomeansno, Cocteau Twins’ Liz Fraser and Cardiacs, the review concluded that the album was "one fuck-off cosmic rock'n'roll sensation, with scant regard for the songwriting rulebook. Truly, it's a world of unfathomable prog-new-wave wonders. Pop music, then, but not as those in their right mind know it."

The band gigged persistently in and around London during this year, playing once again with Snow Patrol in July.

=== Final years (2000 to mid-2001) ===
Despite the positive response to their album, The Monsoon Bassoon did not get signed by any major labels to enable them to make the next step in scaling up their career. Undeterred, they continued to perform live, and to record and release on Weird Neighbourhood. 2000 saw the release of two seven-inch vinyl split singles, intended as the first two parts of an ongoing collaborative series, in which the band would cover/adapt one piece by a chosen collaborator in and in return would have one of their own pieces covered or adapted in a similar way. Wall of Suss 1 saw the band working with Rothko and Wall Of Suss 2 was a collaboration with Max Tundra.

In mid-2001, The Monsoon Bassoon provided three tracks for the "Summer 2001" box-set release in Day Release Records’ "Four Seasons Singles Club" series (alongside Defeat The Young and The Naysayer). Robots And Electronic Brains commented "Monsoon Bassoon offer up a blast of their patented blueprint of acid-powered sax abuse and corrugated rock. It's Morphine trying some rather less stuporific narcotics. On "God Bless The Monsoon Bassoon" they reprise the Cardiacs-folk of Sidi Bou Said..."

=== Split (late 2001) ===
Despite an ongoing show of confidence and a loyal fanbase, The Monsoon Bassoon's resources were flagging, and a second departure by Jamie Keddie spelled the end of the band. Laurie Osbourne recalls "we had no money and we didn't get signed — there was this big push to approach a label and get signed and it just didn't happen... After that, (Jamie Keddie) left and after that it was just, well, ‘if one of us leaves...’ We were just such a family unit that we had to split up. We'd been together, and lived together for eight years at that point. He left because he had a kid and a family."

In October 2001, via the skippyscage website, Sarah Measures announced that the band had split up. Her statement said:

"The Monsoon Bassoon has always, over its lifetime had the same dynamic five as the lineup. That could never change. We are, to each other, irreplaceable. So, if one of us couldn't continue to be in the band, it really, really wouldn't be the same. All for one and one... etc... With this situation arising, splitting up was the only option. But it's not just about that... we can't stop change (yeah, the wheels of time are turning...folks) and it's exciting for us all to experiment with new idea's, be it individually or together. We are committed friends, redoubtable to the last...so there are and will be plenty of projects...just not under the name of The Monsoon Bassoon. We have made some truly tremendous friends, and had hell of a ride... I'm so glad to have been a part of the greatest psychedelic hard-fuck rocking bastard group of recent times.

Many recordings from the band's last years remain unreleased, including a planned EP called My Kill Hand Never Felt So Good and the initial tracks for a second album provisionally entitled I Am The Master And You Are Coming With Me To Hell.

== Post-split ==
Following the break-up of The Monsoon Bassoon, the various members remained friendly and have worked both separately and together on various projects.

Guitarists (and principal composers) Dan Chudley and Kavus Torabi have sporadically worked together on several projects sharing much of the sound and spirit of their previous band. The first of these was Miss Helsinki, a 2003 band with Richard Larcombe (bass, from Stars In Battledress) and with James Keddie drumming when available: the sound of the group was similar to that of The Monsoon Bassoon, but minus the woodwind/reeds and with considerably simpler song structures. Miss Helsinki only ever played one short gig and released only one song ("I Felt Your Arms Around Me", which appeared on the Useless In Bed Volume 1 released by the tiny independent label House of Stairs) as well as having been released on SoundCloud. . In 2005 Chudley, Torabi and Jamie Keddie reunited in a new rock band called Authority, this time with Craig Fortnam (North Sea Radio Orchestra, the Shrubbies, Lake Of Puppies) playing bass. The band played several London concerts over the next two years and recorded several songs (available on their MySpace and SoundCloud pages), but folded amicably in 2007 due to the members’ other commitments. Chudley and Torabi have continued an occasional musical collaboration via the mainly acoustic psychedelic project Hatchjaw and Bassett .

Subsequently, Kavus Torabi has the busiest ex-member of The Monsoon Bassoon. His main projects are Knifeworld and heading the small independent label Believers Roast, but he has also played guitar for Cardiacs (whom he joined in 2004 and played with until the start of their ongoing hiatus in 2008). He is a key member of avant-rock group Guapo has played and recorded with Bob Drake, Chrome Hoof, was part of the chorus for North Sea Radio Orchestra, and has played with Mediaeval Baebes and Spider Stacy (The Pogues) and has recently joined legendary psychedelic band Gong. He co-hosts with Steve Davis' The Interesting Alternative Show on the Phoenix FM radio station in Essex.

Dan Chudley (now known as Daniel Chudley Le Corre) relocated to His home town, Plymouth with his family. He continues to write and perform music, including original guitar instrumentals, and produces new music under the project name of “Rhoald Earl & Emo”. Laurie Osbourne has written, recorded and performed as the dubstep project Appleblim, while Sarah Measures has played woodwind on records by Mothlite.

From the mid-2000s (decade) Torabi, Chudley and Sarah Measures have periodically reunited as members of the folk group Admirals Hard. This band is made up of members of the London math rock and alt.folk scenes and mostly play re-workings of sea shanties (although their sense of humour and outside musical interests are evident in their sea-shantified cover of Iron Maiden's Stranger In A Strange Land). The full line-up is Andy Carne (lead vocals), Kavus Torabi (mandolin, guitar and vocals), Dan Chudley (bass and vocals), Sarah Measures (flute and vocals), Stars In Battledress members Richard Larcombe (guitar, harmonium, vocals) and James Larcombe (harmonium, melodeon, hurdy-gurdy, vocals), Paul Westwood (ex-Geiger Counter and Foe, hammered dulcimer, harmonium, vocals) and Becky Jacobs (vocals, also in Tunng).

== Band members ==
- Kavus Torabi – guitar, vocals
- Daniel Chudley - Le Corre – guitar, vocals
- Sarah Measures – saxophone, clarinet, flute, vocals
- Laurie Osborne – bass
- Jamie Frazer Keddie – drums

== Discography ==
=== Albums ===
- I Dig Your Voodoo CD (1999, Weird Neighbourhood) WNRS4

=== Singles and EPs ===
- Redoubtable cassette EP (1995, Org Records) ORG007
- "Wise Guy" 7" (1998, Weird Neighbourhood) WNRS1
- "In the Iceman's Back Garden" 7" (1998, Weird Neighbourhood) WNRS2
- "The King of Evil" 7" (1999, Weird Neighbourhood) WNRS3
- "Wall of Suss 1" 7" split single with Rothko (2000, Weird Neighbourhood) WNRS5
- "Wall of Suss 2" 7" split single with Max Tundra (2000, Weird Neighbourhood) WNRS6
- 'My Kill Hand Never Felt So Good' EP (unreleased)

=== Compilations ===
- Summer 2001: 4 Seasons Singles Club 3 x CD (2001, Day Release Records) DRSUM01 (featuring the tracks "The Noosemaker", "God Bless The Monsoon Bassoon" and "Brickfields")
- Useless in Bed Volume 1 Compilation CD (2002, House Of Stairs) HOS001CD (featuring "Stag" from the unreleased In Bold Gardens EP)

=== Demo cassettes ===
- In Bold Gardens (1998)

== Artwork ==
All Monsoon Bassoon single and album artwork was designed by David Barclay, a tattooist in Old Street, London.

== Related bands ==
- Die Laughing – Plymouth metal band, featuring Kavus and Dan before forming the Monsoon Bassoon
- Squid Squad – Plymouth-based band, featuring Dan, Sarah and Jamie before the Monsoon Bassoon
- Knifeworld – New band formed by Kavus Torabi, originally a solo project
- The Don and Only – An electronic solo project by Dan Chudley
- Hatchjaw and Bassett – Dan Chudley and Kavus Torabi's largely experimental recordings
- Admirals Hard – Sea shanty band, led by Andy Carne and featuring ex-Monsoon Bassoon members
- Max Tundra – Members have acted as backing musicians for this electronic composer, and his song 'Acorns' is a posthumous tribute to the band.
- Miss Helsinki – Rock band briefly formed by Kavus, Dan and Jamie c. 2003
- Authority – New band formed by Kavus, Dan and Jamie in 2005
- Cardiacs – leader Tim Smith produced many of the Monsoon Bassoon's recordings, and Kavus Torabi now plays guitar in this seminal underground band.
- Guapo – Kavus Torabi also plays guitar in this UK avant-progressive act
- Daniel Chudley - Le Corre – Electronic and acoustic recordings - Ambient psychedelic folk instrumentals https://danielchudley-lecorre.bandcamp.com/follow_me
