= Rhodri Marsden =

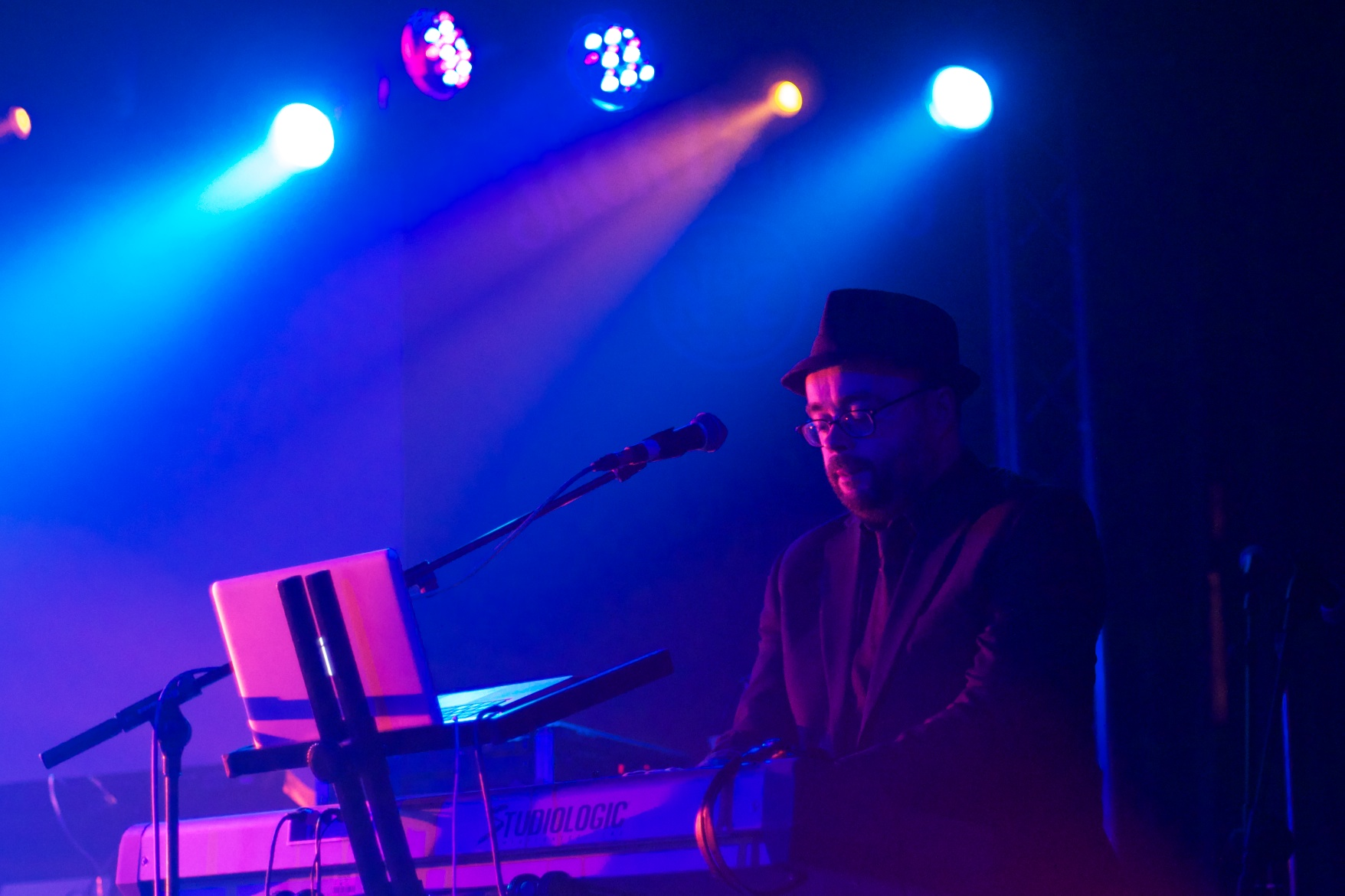
- Marsden in 2012

Background information
- Born: 1 October 1971 (age 55); St Albans, Hertfordshire, England
- Occupations: Writer; musician; musical director; producer; composer; copywriter
- Instruments: Keyboards; guitar; bass guitar; bassoon; musical saw; vocals
- Years active: 1990–present
- Member of: Scritti Politti; Cardiacs; The Free French; Prescott; Dream Themes; Lost Crowns; Article 54
- Formerly of: The Keatons
- Website: rhodri.biz

Rhodri Marsden (born 1 October 1971) is a London-based writer and musician.

== Journalism ==
Prior to the demise of the print edition of The Independent, Marsden wrote a technology column for nearly ten years, along with other columns on a range of subjects for the daily paper and the Saturday magazine. He previously wrote The Observer Music Monthly's "Guitarist Wanted" column, which required him to go undercover to audition for bands that he had no intention of joining. Apart from music and technology writing, Marsden is well known for his humorous, offbeat features written in an understated, self-deprecating style.

Other publications he has written for include The Guardian, Time Out, New Statesman, Daily Telegraph, and Olive magazine. His first book, FWD This Link, was published by Rough Guides in 2008 and his next, The Next Big Thing followed a year later. A third, Crap Dates: Disastrous Encounters From Single Life, was published in February 2012 and featured stories of people's terrible dates that were initially shared on Twitter and subsequently went viral. In 2017 his book A Very British Christmas was published by HarperCollins. Since 2022 he has been an editorial contributor to How to Spend It (HTSI), a weekly magazine of the newspaper Financial Times, writing the Technopolis column.

== Music ==
From 1990 to 1995 Marsden played guitar in London art-punk collective The Keatons, who notably supported Blur on their first tour of the UK but were thrown off for unprofessional conduct – as documented in Blur's biography, 3862 Days. He also sang with Gag, who recorded a Peel Session in 1993. Marsden had an earlier run-in with John Peel at the age of 17 when his fanzine, Glottal Stop, was the subject of a piece on Peel's show on BBC Radio Cambridgeshire.

In 2007 he worked on a DIY music project called "The Schema" – an attempt to get a single written, recorded, released and promoted on the internet in the space of a month. The accompanying video, directed by Alex de Campi and featuring Marysia Kay, became a hit on YouTube, but the single sold poorly.

He currently plays with Scritti Politti, Sweet Billy Pilgrim, Cardiacs, Stars in Battledress offshoot Lost Crowns, and Kenny Process Team. He also played regularly in Frank Sidebottom's Oh Blimey Big Band before creator Chris Sievey's death in 2010. A multi-instrumentalist, he has produced many recordings for Lush's ECC record label, and artists including Spearmint. He has also released three albums of his own music under the name The Free French on Spearmint's record label, Hitback Records.

In October 2019, along with a group of musicians calling themselves Article 54, he released The Hustle, an eight track concept disco symphony album with tracks inspired by the UK's Brexit negotiations. Tracks from the album were debuted on the 10 October edition of the BBC One political programme Brexitcast. It then appeared on the iTunes UK Album Chart, where it quickly began to outsell ABBA Gold. The album appeared on the Official UK Charts on 18 October, debuting at number 56 on the download chart.
