= Stars in Battledress (band) =

English musical duo

- Years active: 1999–present
- Labels: House of Stairs; Believers Roast
- Members: James Larcombe; Richard Larcombe
- Website: starsinbattledress.com

Stars in Battledress are an English musical duo featuring brothers Richard and James Larcombe. They are notable for their complex but tuneful compositions, their unorthodox fusion of folk music sources and British/American art rock influences, and for their intricate and allusive lyrics.

The duo have ties to other bands including North Sea Radio Orchestra, Cardiacs, The Monsoon Bassoon, Max Tundra, Admirals' Hard and Lost Crowns.

== Sound ==
Stars in Battledress draw strongly on traditional folk sources (most obviously in their use of folk instrumentation such as harmonium and autoharp, and in the specifically English inflections of Richard Larcombe's singing voice), 1990s American art rock (such as Don Caballero) and the complex "psychedelic mediaeval" music of the related British bands Cardiacs and The Sea Nymphs. Though the band have displayed a reluctance to be associated directly with progressive rock, the complexity of their music and the use of expansive keyboard textures have sometimes seen them labelled as a progressive rock act: Richard Larcombe's distinctly English tenor delivery has sometimes seen him compared to Richard Sinclair (Caravan, Hatfield and the North, etc.).

Stars in Battledress are also notable for Richard Larcombe's literate and allusive post-modern lyrics, which span traditional topics such as love songs and social advancement while also cross-referencing more unusual subjects such as silent film, doppelgangers, historical figures such as Havelock Ellis, the English landscape painters Thomas Gainsborough and John Constable and the work of the Canadian hard-rock band Voivod (sometimes incorporating several of these subjects within the same song).

== History ==
=== Stars in Battledress prehistory ===
Richard Larcombe (vocals, guitars, harmonium, autoharp) and younger brother James Larcombe (piano, harmonium, church organ, hurdy-gurdy, various keyboards) grew up in a musical family in the region of Plymouth, Devon, UK. The brothers were tentative musical collaborators from a fairly young age and had always intended to take their collective work further. Richard also attended school with future musical ally Kavus Torabi (Cardiacs, The Monsoon Bassoon, Guapo etc.).

Moving to London during the 1990s, Richard formed rock band Magnilda with himself on lead vocals and guitar - other members included future television and radio presenter Iain Lee (bass, vocals) and Cardiacs roadie "Captain" John Hook (drums). Magnilda displayed Richard's taste for complex and witty songs using advanced harmony (at this point, in a more straightforward indie-rock context) and tongue-in-cheek humour. Sometimes compared to mid-period XTC, they produced one cassette demo (Clocks Are Like People) and played concerts alongside (among others) The Monsoon Bassoon and The Shrubbies (the latter featuring various ex-Cardiacs and future North Sea Radio Orchestra members). The band came to an end in late 1998/early 1999, partly due to Lee's increasing commitment to The 11 O'Clock Show. At around the same time, James Larcombe was attending the University of Oxford.

=== 1999-2002: formation and early years ===
Upon James' graduation and subsequent move to London in 1999, he and Richard formed Stars in Battledress, naming themselves after the British military entertainment organisation. Unsuited to the environment of touring rock bands or indeed most rock venues, Stars in Battledress concentrated on playing small or acoustic-orientated venues where their drum-less lineup (generally Richard playing semi-acoustic guitar and James playing harmonium and digital piano) would work better. (This is a practise which they have continued to this day - appearing at smaller venues such as Toynbee Hall and Lark In The Park and sympathetic underground clubnights such as The Orchestra Pit - although they have notably played the larger capacity University Of London Union and The Garage, London in support of Cardiacs). The Larcombes had by now befriended their old musical hero - Cardiacs leader Tim Smith - and he was later to produce the recording sessions for their debut album.

Along with members of Foe, Ursa and The Monsoon Bassoon, the Larcombes became involved in setting up the small House Of Stairs record label. Their first appearance on record – the instrumental "Sand (Blowing About)", described as "a beautiful dance of fluent piano and autoharp" by Evophonic - appeared on the label's 2002 compilation Useless In Bed Vol. 1.

=== 2003-2009: Secrets And Signals and subsequent hiatus ===
In 2003 this was followed by the debut Stars in Battledress album, Secrets And Signals, which received favourable reviews in the underground press. Aural Innovations recommended the album to "those who enjoy a theatrical flair to their music" and described it as "a sometimes rich, sometimes sparse tapestry of progressive chamber pop", also noting its "lush, dreamy, fantasy quality". Ink19, noting the band's "ethereal and distinctly English" quality (and comparing them to similarly English mavericks such as Julian Cope or Felt) concluded "one has to be impressed with the talent and skill that the brothers Lancombe bring to this release with their considerable abilities... Yet, for all their technical ability and prowess, this album remains one that fails to connect emotionally." Pop Matters noted that "there is a richness and intelligent approach to each and every track" while cautioning that the album is "very pretty in some respects, but... lacks small intangibles in others."

Following the album release, Stars in Battledress played occasional live concerts (notably supporting Cardiacs and Momus). They initially planned to follow up the album with an EP called Story Of The Hood Tapes, Vol. 1, but this was eventually shelved. In the event, it would be eight years before they released a follow-up to Secrets And Signals, with the Larcombes concentrating on other projects in the meantime.

=== 2010-present: return to work and In Droplet Form ===
In 2010, Stars in Battledress broke their silence by contributing a cover version of the Cardiacs song "Foundling" to the Tim Smith fundraising album Leader of the Starry Skies: A Tribute to Tim Smith, Songbook 1. In 2011, this was followed by "Fluent English", the first new Stars in Battledress material in eight years, which was included on The Central Element (a limited edition compilation showcasing all the acts on Kavus Torabi's label Believers Roast, and which also included the brothers performing as part of Admirals' Hard on the track "Whip Jamboree").

In June 2014, Stars in Battledress released their second full-length album on the Believers Roast label, In Droplet Form, which they promoted with a number of live shows in and around London, as well as uploading a series of performances filmed at Westminster Kingsway College to YouTube. The album combined songs that had been played in their live sets for many years, such as "Fluent English", "Buy One Now", "Mewstone Avenue"(retitled "A Winning Decree") and "Hollywood Says So", along with more recent material such as "Unmatchable Bride", first premièred live in 2011.

The album received generally positive reviews from online and print media sources. Joe Banks of The Quietus described it as "tapping into something unique and undefinable," and "a genuinely mysterious album...like stepping into a haunted room never to return again." Prog Magazine called it "wittily experimental without being overbearing," while Uncut highlighted the album's debt to the Canterbury scene. In 2014, speaking with The Quietus about his favourite albums, Kavus Torabi picked In Droplet Form, saying:

I genuinely think this is one of my favourite albums of all time, and it's such an honour to put it out on my label. Whatever pathetic little label Believers Roast might be, to get to have a record like this on it was almost the whole reason to start it up in the first place. [...] Almost no one is writing music to this level of perfection. When the dust settles on this whole modern music trip, this will be one of the albums that shines through.

Since the release of In Droplet Form, Stars in Battledress have continued to play intermittent and occasional concerts.

== Related projects and associations (including Defeat the Young and Lost Crowns) ==
The Larcombes have been regular members of William D. Drake's live band since the early 2000s, and performed on his 2011 album The Rising Of The Lights. Both brothers are or have been members of the contemporary music ensemble North Sea Radio Orchestra (in which James plays organ, monosynth and various keyboards while Richard previously sang as both featured soloist and chorus member), and the sea-shanty band Admirals' Hard (in which Richard sings and plays guitar while James plays hurdy-gurdy - other group members are from The Monsoon Bassoon, Foe, and Tunng). In 2008, Richard and James Larcombe contributed remixes to Max Tundra's download-only covers album Best Friends in 2008 ( Richard remixed "Lamplight On A One-Horse Shoe" as "The Singing Doctor" and James remixed "The Balaton" as "Oakeshott").

Parallel with early Stars in Battledress work, the Larcombes were involved in another project called Defeat The Young - similar in scope to Stars in Battledress but firmly under Richard's control and with a stronger theatrical/music hall factor (George Formby and The Marx Brothers were added to the existing list of influences). With Richard in exclusive charge of songwriting and singing, James played hurdy-gurdy and various keyboards while other contributors included Paul Westwood (hammer dulcimer, ex-Foe/Geiger Counter), composer Terry Mann (double bass/vocals - and the Larcombe's brother-in-law) and Mark Braby (bass – organiser of The Orchestra Pit avant-garde performance nights in London). The band released a single eponymous three-song EP ("Bad Penny Said She Likes Me", "Lift Up What You're Wearing" and "King Of A Frozen World") which initially came out on the "Four Seasons Singles Club – Summer 2001" box set (day Release Records) and was subsequently issued separately by the band. A fourth song ("I'm Ruining Something") appeared on the House of Stairs Useless In Bed Vol. 1 2002 compilation. The band played several London dates (including a performance at the 12 Bar Club in November 2002 alongside Rhatigan, Tim Bowness/Peter Chilvers and David Schweitzer) but then ceased activity.

Also in 2002, Richard Larcombe played bass with Kavus Torabi's short-lived post-Monsoon Bassoon project Miss Helsinki.

James Larcombe currently plays keyboards for revived British psychedelic rock band Zag And The Coloured Beads. He is also a member of Arch Garrison, the solo vehicle of North Sea Radio Orchestra frontman Craig Fortnam, and plays on the 2014 album I Will Be A Pilgrim.

Richard Larcombe's latest project outside Stars in Battledress is Lost Crowns, for which he once again writes all the material. The band has made two appearances to date (both at Alphabet Business Concern festivals in Salisbury) with a London debut planned for January 2018. Other Lost Crown band members have included Charlie Cawood (bass guitar), Rhodri Marsden (keyboards), Josh Perl (keyboards) and Nicola Baigent (clarinet).

== Discography ==
=== Stars in Battledress ===
- "Sand (Blowing About)" (track on Useless In Bed, Vol. 1 House of Stairs label compilation, 2003)
- Secrets And Signals (House of Stairs, 2003)
- The Story Of The Hood Tapes, Vol 1 (unreleased)
- "Foundling" (track on Leader of the Starry Skies: A Tribute to Tim Smith, Songbook 1 compilation tribute album to Tim Smith, 2010)
- "Fluent English" (track on The Central Element compilation, 2011)
- In Droplet Form (Believers Roast, 2014)
