= William Johnson Cory =

English educator and poet (1823–1892)

William Cory
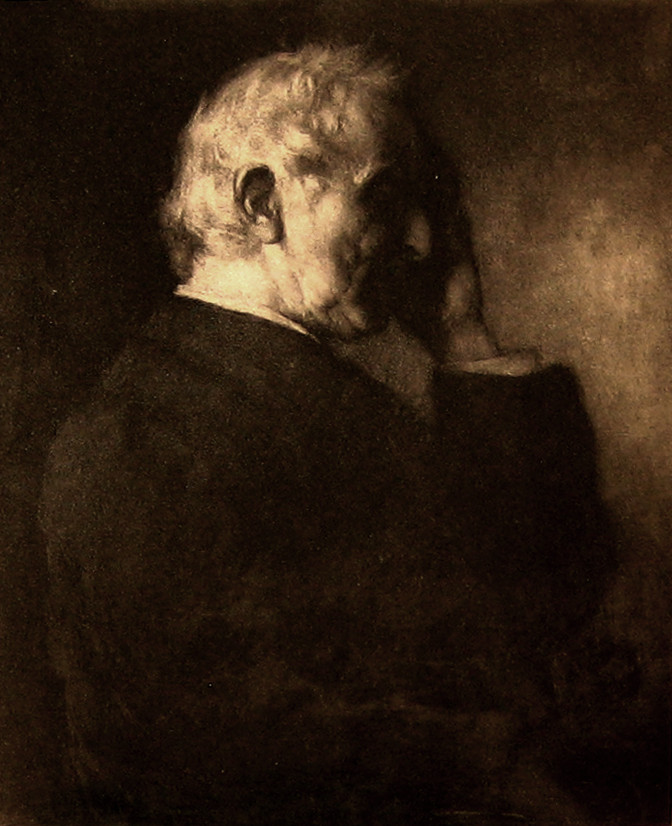
- Born: William Johnson; 9 January 1823; Great Torrington, Devon, England
- Died: 11 June 1892 (aged 69); Hampstead, London, England
- Education: Eton College; King's College, Cambridge
- Occupation: Teacher
- Writing career
- Language: English
- Genre: Poetry
- Notable work: Ionica

William Johnson Cory (9 January 1823 – 11 June 1892), born William Johnson, was an English educator and poet. He was dismissed from his post at Eton for encouraging a culture of intimacy, possibly non-sexual, between teachers and pupils. He is widely known for his English version of the elegy Heraclitus by Callimachus.

== Life ==
He was born at Great Torrington in Devon, and educated at Eton, where he was afterwards a renowned master, nicknamed "Tute" (short for "tutor") by his pupils. After Eton, where he won the Newcastle Scholarship, he studied at King's College, Cambridge, where he won the Chancellor's Medal for an English poem on Plato in 1843, and the Craven Scholarship in 1844. He was a writer of Latin verse as well as English verse. Although best known for the much-anthologised "Heraclitus", an adaptation of an elegy by Callimachus, ("They told me Heraclitus, they told me you were dead"), his chief poetical work is the collection Ionica. (Note: Ionica (Smith, Elder & Co., 1858. iv, 116 pages) contained 48 poems, two dated 1851 and 1855. Ionica II (C.U.P., 1877. 48 pages) had 25 poems, several bearing dates in the period 1859–1877. Ionica (George Allen, 1891. vi, 210 pages) contained 85 poems, omitting six of the 1858 volume and two of the 1877 book, but adding 20 new poems, three dated 1877, 1885 and 1889. The collected edition Ionica edited by A. C. Benson (George Allen, 1905. xxxii, 220 pages) restored five poems dropped in 1891 – three from the 1858 volume and two from the 1877 book – and added one from a letter of 1862 (first published in the Letters and Journals of 1897). Still omitted were "A Chobham Song", "Rhymes at the Wrong End" and "The Bridesmaid".)

Cory became an assistant master at Eton in 1845 just after graduating from King's. He insisted on the centrality of personal ties between teacher and student. The historian G. W. Prothero described him as "the most brilliant Eton tutor of his day". Arthur Coleridge described him as "the wisest master who has ever been at Eton". Among his former pupils are numbered several statesmen of the period, including Lord Rosebery, Captain Algernon Drummond, Henry Scott Holland, Howard Overing Sturgis, Charles Wood, 2nd Viscount Halifax and Arthur Balfour. He wrote the lyrics of the Eton Boating Song, first performed in 1863.

=== Resignation ===
Johnson was forced to resign from Eton at Easter 1872 after an "indiscreet letter" that he had written to a pupil was intercepted by the boy's parents and brought to the notice of the headmaster. Although it has been suggested that Johnson was a devoted paederast who numbered among his paramours Reginald Brett, the future Lord Esher, the Oxford Dictionary of National Biography maintains that this cannot be proved and that "No one can be quite sure of the exact circumstances of his resignation," adding: "There is no question, however, that he was dangerously fond of a number of boys. Although he probably did not allow his affections to take any physical form, he permitted intimacies between the boys. This conduct was brought to the notice of the headmaster, James Hornby, who demanded Johnson's resignation." In dismissing Johnson, Hornby commented that it was not for committing acts of “immorality in the ordinary sense of the word”, meaning sodomy in the euphemism of the era, and an alternative view of Johnson's dismissal is given by William C. Lubenow, who posits that Hornby "turfed out William Johnson and Oscar Browning because they were liberal reformers in a highly authoritarian institution ... [they] attempted to create a community where power and personality, desire and discipline, and love and learning were integrated. They committed the crime of Socrates: they corrupted youth by creating a world of multiple loyalties."

Giovanni Costigan wrote in 1972, "In the century that has passed since then, no further light, incredible as it may seem, has been shed upon the subject [of Johnson's dismissal] ... It may finally be remarked that in every reference yet made to this curious episode there seems never to have been a mention of the word 'homosexuality'."

Johnson retired to Halsdon and changed his name on 17 October 1872 to Cory (the maiden name of his paternal grandmother) before emigrating for health reasons to Madeira in February 1878, where he married and had a son. He returned to England in September 1882, settling in Hampstead, where he died on 11 June 1892. He was buried at Hampstead on 16 June.

=== Posthumous influence ===
Cory is noted for a letter in which he articulates the purpose of education. His words are taken by many as a justification for studying Latin. The full quotation goes:

At school you are engaged not so much in acquiring knowledge as in making mental efforts under criticism. A certain amount of knowledge you can indeed with average faculties acquire so as to retain; nor need you regret the hours you spent on much that is forgotten, for the shadow of lost knowledge at least protects you from many illusions. But you go to a great school not so much for knowledge as for arts and habits; for the habit of attention, for the art of expression, for the art of assuming at a moment's notice a new intellectual position, for the art of entering quickly into another person's thoughts, for the habit of submitting to censure and refutation, for the art of indicating assent or dissent in graduated terms, for the habit of regarding minute points of accuracy, for the art of working out what is possible in a given time, for taste, for discrimination, for mental courage, and for mental soberness.

In 1924 an entire book devoted to Cory was printed, entitled Ionicus. The author was Reginald Baliol Brett, 2nd Viscount Esher, to whom Johnson had grown close when Brett was a schoolboy. By then Brett was an adviser to the government and one of the most eminent and powerful men of his time. He had begun a correspondence with Cory while he was at Eton and continued it until the time of Cory's death. The dedication mentions three Prime Ministers, two of whom (Rosebery and Balfour) learnt at Eton "the elements of high politics from IONICUS" (Rosebery and Balfour), whereas the third (Asquith) "showed him kindness in his old age".

== Notes ==
References
