= Craig Fortnam =

English composer, conductor and musician

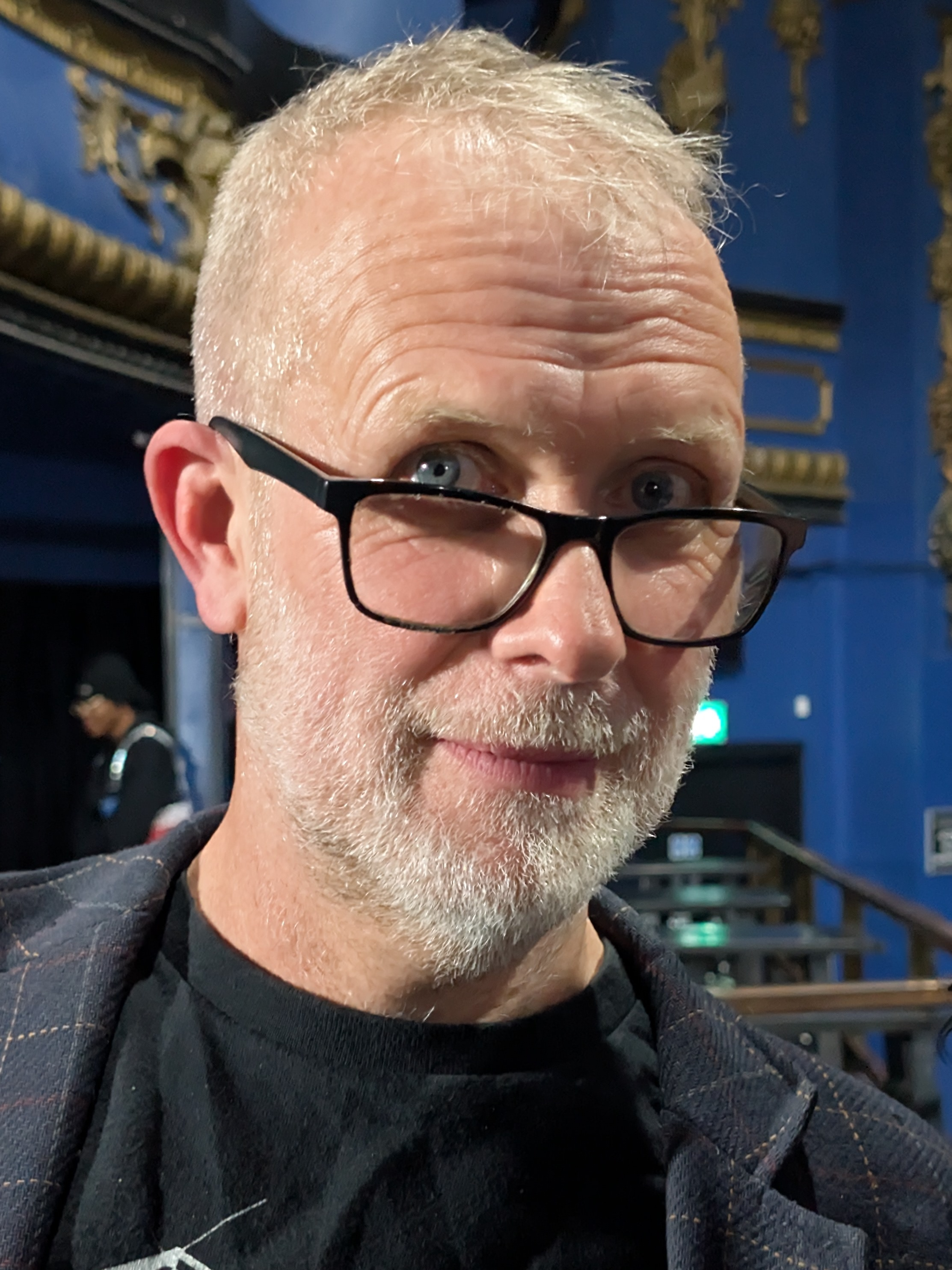
- Fortnam at Electric Brixton in 2026

Background information
- Born: Craig Edward Fortnam; September 1967 (age 58); Oxford, Oxfordshire, England
- Occupations: Composer; conductor; musician
- Instruments: Guitar; bass guitar; vocals; keyboards; percussion
- Labels: Onomatopoeia; Believers Roast
- Member of: North Sea Radio Orchestra; Arch Garrison; Cardiacs
- Formerly of: The Grown-Ups; Lake of Puppies; Shrubbies; Knifeworld; Panixphere
- Spouse: Sharron Saddington (m. 2003)
- Partner: Chloe Herington

Craig Edward Fortnam (born September 1967) is an English composer, conductor and musician. As a boy he lived in Blewbury Oxfordshire, moving to Kingston-Upon-Thames in 1977. Fortnam is a skilled guitarist and bass guitarist, specialising in nylon-string acoustic guitar (which he plays in a style drawing on classical and African techniques and the work of Nick Drake) and also sings. He is best known as the leader, conductor and principal composer of the North Sea Radio Orchestra, but also leads the smaller band Arch Garrison and was previously a key member of several other bands, most notably the Shrubbies and Lake of Puppies.

== Career ==
=== Musical education and early years in rock bands ===
Fortnam trained in composition and guitar at Dartington College of Arts, England before moving back to London in the early 1990s to seek work as a musician. During this time, he played with several rock and folk bands connected with the cult English rock band Cardiacs, striking up a long-lasting relationship with several of the band members. Among the bands Fortnam played in was Lake of Puppies (a "psychedelic acoustic" band led by former Cardiacs keyboard player William D. Drake), in which he met his future wife and long-term collaborator Sharron Saddington (later to be known as Sharron Fortnam). Fortnam and Saddington went on to form a similar pop group called the Shrubbies with two more ex-Cardiacs, saxophonist Sarah Smith and drummer Dominic Luckman.

During this time, Fortnam wrote a wide variety of music including some contemporary classical compositions which were performed by ensembles including the Kreutzer Quartet and the Britten Sinfonia.

=== North Sea Radio Orchestra ===
Craig and Sharron Fortnam formed North Sea Radio Orchestra (also known as NSRO) in 2002 as a vehicle for Craig's more classically inclined compositions and Sharron's voice (an unusual soprano blending elements of folk, rock, and classical music). The ensemble grew from an octet to a twenty-person grouping including a vocal chorus and has released five albums of original compositions – North Sea Radio Orchestra (2006), Birds (2008) and I a Moon (2011) Dronne (2016) and Special Powers (2025). Fortnam's brother, who was schizophrenic and had been mentally ill and physically unwell during his life, suddenly died during the writing of Dronne, with his death becoming a key influence on the album. NSRO has received a large amount of critical acclaim and played a wide variety of venues including many historic London churches and the Roundhouse.

=== Arch Garrison ===
Fortnam founded a more folk-influenced project, Arch Garrison, in 2010: initially as a duo of himself on voice and nylon-string guitar and Sharron Fortnam on backing vocals (Sharron would later leave the band, while James Larcombe joined on keyboards). The debut Arch Garrison album, King of the Down, was released by Double Six records on 22 February 2010, followed by I Will Be A Pilgrim (The Household Mark, THM003) in 2014 and The Bitter Lay (Believers Roast, BR24) in 2020.

=== Work under his own name ===
Since 2021, Fortnam has been releasing a mixture of song-based and instrumental music under his own name, beginning with Ark (Onomatopoeia) in 2021, and Instrumental Music 1 (Believers Roast) in 2022. A series of Bandcamp single releases put out over 2022 on a schedule based on the lunar calendar were compiled as Lunar One A Sides (Full Moon Releases Oct 2021 – Sept 22) and Lunar One B Sides (Full Moon Releases Oct 2021 – Sept 22)both released in November 2022 on Believers Roast and Bandcamp.

=== Work as session musician/instrumentalist ===
Fortnam was a featured musician on the soundtrack to the film A Mighty Heart (2007), playing both guitar and bass guitar. and also played guitar on the soundtrack to the 2008 film Shifty (written by Molly Nyman and NSRO member Harry Escott).

== Discography ==
=== With Shrubbies ===
- The Shrubbies EP (1997, Merlin Audio)
- Memphis in Texas (1999, Merlin Audio)

=== With North Sea Radio Orchestra ===
Albums

- North Sea Radio Orchestra (2006, Oof! Records)
- Birds (2008, Oof! Records)
- I a Moon (2011, The Household Mark)
- Dronne (2016, The Household Mark)
- Folly Bololey – The Music of Robert Wyatt NSRO/Greaves/Barbazza (2019, Dark Companion)
- Gap Species (2019, The Household Mark)
- Special Powers (2025, Believer's Roast)

Singles and EPs

- "North Sea Radio Orchestra" (2003, private release)
- "The Flower" (2005, Oof! Records)
- "The End of Chimes" (2007, Oof! Records)

Compilation appearances

- Folk Off: New Folk and Psychedelia from the British Isles and North America (2006, Sunday Best Recordings – NSRO contributes "Guitar Miniature")
- The Arctic Circle Presents: That Fuzzy Feeling (2007, Arctic Circle Records – NSRO contributes "O Come O Come Emanuel")
- Mojo Presents: The Wall Re-Built! (Disc Two) (2009, Mojo Magazine – NSRO contributes “Vera/Bring the Boys Back Home”)
- Leader of the Starry Skies: A Tribute to Tim Smith, Songbook 1 (2011 – Believers Roast – NSRO contributes “March”)

=== With Knifeworld ===
- Dear Lord, No Deal EP (2011)

=== With Arch Garrison ===
- King of the Down (2010, Double Six)
- I Will Be A Pilgrim (2014, The Household Mark)
- The Bitter Lay (2020, Believers Roast)

=== With Cardiacs ===
- LSD (2025, Alphabet Business Concern)

=== Solo ===
- Ark (2021, Onomatopoeia)
- Instrumental Music 1 (2022, Believers Roast)
- Lunar One A Sides (Full Moon Releases Oct 2021 – Sept 22) (2022, Believers Roast)
- Lunar One B Sides (Full Moon Releases Oct 2021 – Sept 22) (2022, Believers Roast)
- Bespoke Guitar Pieces (2024, Believers Roast)
- Bespoke String Trios (2024, Believers Roast)
- Music for String Quartet & Percussion (2025, UMC)

=== Collaborative ===
- The Exquisite Corpse Game (2013, Believers Roast)
- Empty Vessels Craig Fortnam//Laurent Valero (2026, Dark Companion)
