= Foundling (Cardiacs song) =

Rock song by Cardiacs

Song by Cardiacs

from the album Sing to God
- Released: 10 June 1996
- Recorded: 1995
- Length: 5:27
- Label: Alphabet Business Concern
- Songwriter: Tim Smith
- Producer: Tim Smith

"Foundling" is a song by the English rock band Cardiacs from their fourth studio album, Sing to God (1996). Written and produced by Tim Smith, it is a ballad built on dense keyboards and searing synth with gentle vocals and lyrical ideas about the afterlife. Reviewers considered the song an effective album closer, noting its beauty and emotional resonance. The song was included on compilations released by Org Records; a cover version by Spiritwo was released as a single by Org in 2007.

== Background and release ==
Tim Smith wrote songs when he could over 1994 and laid down piano and drum demos of them all, sticking to a simple approach to focus on intricate and engaging song structures. This approach differed from the past, as he had always arranged the parts as he went. The recording of Sing to God, a double album of 22 tracks, took place during the breaks of 1995, a particularly active year on the live front. Jon Poole played the majority of the bass parts as Jim Smith, Tim's brother, took less of a musical role, focusing more on engineering and editing. The album was produced by Tim Smith, who wrote the music and words of "Foundling".

"Foundling" was included as the 12th and final track on Part Two of Sing to God, released on 10 June 1996 by the Alphabet Business Concern. The song also appeared on the split EP or single Cardiacs/Camp Blackfoot (1999) and the compilation album Cardiacs and Affectionate Friends (2001), both released by Org Records, the label associated with the Organ fanzine. It was covered by the duo Stars in Battledress for the 2010 tribute album Leader of the Starry Skies.

== Music and lyrics ==
"Foundling" is a ballad. Its instrumentation includes a "searing synth", and is built on "dense keyboards". The song uses two "prolonged" versions of what blogger Dan Schmidt calls the "Tim Smith cadence": ♭III-♭VII-IV-vI and ♭III-♭VI-♭VII -♭VI-vi. On Sing to God, "Foundling" fades in from the keyboard lines of the previous track "Nurses Whispering Verses". Writer Eric Benac said the song "produces a satisfying symmetry with 'Eden on the Air'". In The Quietus, Sean Kitching compared the song to the gentler territory of Smith's Sea Nymphs project. According to Benac, its lyrics "weave a spooky ghost story" which plays with the ideas of the afterlife throughout the album—the bride, who comes from nowhere, haunts the "big dead boy" and stays in bed with him; he is not appreciative as he's giving himself "ten showers a day" in ponds and rivers, yet he cannot escape her and together they walk in the afterlife, as angels of a sort. Benac noted that the music mirrors the "ghostly lady" and "walking with angels", highlighting the line "I could walk with angels, but I'd rather walk with you" as working especially well.

== Reception ==
In a review of Sing to God, the Organ described "Foundling" as "soul-wrenching". In 2012, Punknews.org reviewer Skibz777 called "Foundling" a "spacey Floyd-ish song" and a "gorgeous closer" which "ties everything together on an impossibly sublime note". Nick Reed from The Quietus selected the song for its emotional resonance as one which makes him cry, calling it a "gorgeous ballad with this absolutely wrenching noise that I can't even describe." On the 2014 reissue of Sing to God, Kitching described "Foundling" as "tremulously lovely" alongside the track "No Gold", and Drowned in Sound's Benjamin Bland described the song as having "subdued beauty". Benac opined that Sing to God could've ended with the ambience of "Nurses Whispering Verses", but instead ended with the mysterious "Foundling". He considered the music "simple but effective, with Tim's voice as gentle as possible" and the love story a "creepy but affecting one."

== Spiritwo version ==
"Foundling"

Single by Spiritwo
- B-side: "Inner Self" (Sepultura cover); "No Such Thing"; "Video Store"
- Released: 19 February 2007
- Length: 4:10
- Label: Org
- Songwriter: Tim Smith

Spiritwo singles chronology
"Foundling" (2007)	"Bee/Alchemy" (2009)

The London-based pop project Spiritwo, fronted by a female singer of Israeli descent, recorded a version of "Foundling" as her debut single. (Note: Org Records also refers to the release as an EP.) It was released as a four-track CD single on 19 February 2007 via Org Records as Part 29 of their monthly "Org-An-Ised" singles series. A studio version of Spiritwo's dance cover of Sepultura's "Inner Self" also appears on the single, as well as two original tracks. Spiritwo originally recorded "Foundling" for an eight song demo which was made Organ Demo of the Week on 4 August 2005.

=== Track listing ===
All songs by Spiritwo except "Foundling" by T. Smith and "Inner Self" by M. Cavalera/Kisser.

CD single

1. "Foundling" (Cardiacs cover) – 4:10
2. "Inner Self" (Sepultura cover) – 3:42
3. "No Such Thing" – 4:28
4. "Video Store" – 3:42

=== Personnel ===
Credits adapted from the liner notes of "Foundling".

Publishing

- Spiritwo (Copyright Control)
- T. Smith (Copyright Control)
- M. Cavalera/Kisser (BMG Songs)
