= The Display Team =

British punk band

- Also known as: Mumrah (2000–2006)
- Origin: London, England
- Genres: Pronk; progressive rock; punk rock; psychedelic; jazz; ska
- Years active: 2000–present
- Labels: Genin
- Members: Chuckles The Clown; Jimb; Samwise; Joshing; Stanley Elvis
- Past members: Iain Mackenzie; Greg Cruse; DJ Implant; Nixo; Tiny Tommy Toot-Fruit; Ozrick; T-Cass; Mickey Bones
- Website: thedisplayteam.co.uk

The Display Team are a six-piece independent progressive punk band from South-East London, England. The group has received airplay in the UK on BBC Radio 6 Music and Phoenix FM, along with many shows podcast by DJs on Kooba Radio which is heard worldwide on the Internet.

== History ==
Begun in 2000, the band was known as Mumrah until 2006. The original members were Iain MacKenzie (rhythm guitar), Jimb (guitar), Chuckles the Clown (drums and voice), Greg Cruse (bass) and DJ Implant (voice and turntables). This incarnation was short-lived and Implant and Cruse left the band; Iain MacFrenzy assumed the position of lead vocalist and Nixo (bass) became a full-time member. The band expanded to include Mickey Bones (trombone, voice) and Tiny Tommy Toot-Fruit (Arif Driessen, trumpet and voice, now of UK/US ambient rock band *Shels). Toot Fruit left the band in 2008 to be replaced by T-Cass (trumpet, voice). The line-up at that time consisted of Iain MacFrenzy (rhythm guitar and voice), Chuckles The Clown (drums and voice), Jimb (lead guitar and voice), Oz (bass guitar and voice), Mickey Bones (trombone and voice) and T-Cass (trumpet and voice). This personnel recorded the album, Drones, in mid-2008 which was released on the Genin label - home of Djevara, Elephant Vs Leopard, Thumpermonkey, Claypigeon, Frowser and Pigshakle - on 1 February 2010.

Due to his commitments elsewhere, T-Cass left in early 2010 to play in alt-rock band They Came From Japan, and was replaced by Samwise, formerly of ska-punk band The Lovespuds, at the end of April. In November 2012, Joshing joined the band on guitar and voice, replacing MacFrenzy who had departed in 2011.

In 2014, the band successfully led a crowd-funding campaign to record a new album, entitled "Shifts", which was released in April 2016 on their own label, "Opposing Forces". Produced by the band and Paul "Tip-top, you don't stop, tip 'o the morning to you, day-tipping" Tipler, who also engineered the album, this was the last foray for Ozrick, who subsequently left the band in 2016 and was replaced by Stanley Elvis. Since then, the band has continued to rehearse and write in anticipation for a new release, as well as perform with artists such as Babar Luck, the Perhaps Contraption, and scando-prog allstars Major Parkinson.

Their music borrows from rock, ska, punk, progressive rock, funk, doo-wop, swing, hardcore and metal.

The Display Team's recordings have been played on BBC Radio 6 Music by Tom Robinson along with Phoenix FM and Kooba Radio. With other bands their contribution to the CD compilation Un-Scene 4 was noted by Rock Sound music magazine as deserving of "an honourable mention."

The group tours the UK and throughout Europe and has appeared on the BBC introducing stage at Rhythms of The World festival, Wasted Festival and Big Rivers Festival in the Czech Republic alongside bands such as Mad Caddies. Under their previous moniker Mumrah they played Uxfest in 2004 and 2006.

The Display Team's music has been influenced by "a wide range of pilferable sources, including Frank Zappa, Cardiacs, Mr. Bungle, Queen and a selection of punk and ska bands too numerous (and sometimes obscure) to single out by name." The band themselves also cite Mad Caddies, Madness, Reel Big Fish, Goldfinger, The Specials and The Beach Boys.

== Band members ==
Current members

- Chuckles The Clown – vocals, drums (2000–present)
- Jimb – guitar, vocals (2000–present)
- Samwise – trumpet, vocals (2010–present)
- Joshing – guitar, vocals (2012–present)
- Stanley Elvis – bass, vocals (2016–present)

Past members

- Iain Mackenzie – vocals, guitar (2000–2012)
- Greg Cruse – bass (2000)
- DJ Implant – vocals, turntables (2000)
- Nixo – vocals, bass (2000–2007)
- Tiny Tommy Toot-Fruit – trumpet, vocals (2003–2008)
- Ozrick – bass, vocals (2007–2016)
- T-Cass – trumpet, vocals (2008–2010)
- Mickey Bones – trombone, vocals (2003–2020)

== Discography ==
=== Albums/EPs ===
==== Huzzah! ====
(As Mumrah)
(Double EP)
Re-released on Riot 2006

Track List:
1. The Toilet
2. Do One
3. RoboChap Vs. Party Boy
4. Floggin' A Dead Horse

Bonus tracks! (“Six Hot Nubbins with the Good Time Gubbins” EP)

5. Gloi Polloi
6. You've Got A Great Future (Behind You)
7. Whinge Binge
8. Big Cheese & Hungry Mice

==== Drones ====
Official Debut Album Released on Genin Records 2010

Track List:
1. Worry Sponge
2. Gnaw The Iron Paw
3. Norwegian Honey
4. Check-Up (from the neck up)
5. Irksome Treasurer
6. Body-Renting
7. Karma's Gonna Get You (filthy scum)
8. Pitfalls of Politeness
9. Wring Wrong
10.A pathetic Pill
11.Conjunctivitis
12.A Letter To Russia

Shifts

Released on Opposing Forces 2016

Track List:
1. A Summer Of Subservience
2. Mercy Nurse
3. Corpus Of Lies
4. The Indecision Prism
5. Epitaph
6. I Am House
7. Foreign Affairs
8. The Crux Of The Brux
9. This Is The News
10. Big Wide Blue

=== Singles ===
==== Worry Sponge ====
2007

Track List:
1. Worry Sponge
2. I Smell Like An Old Man
