= Bellyeye =

Single by Cardiacs

from the album Sing to God
- B-side: "A Horse's Tail"; "No Gold"
- Released: 17 April 1995
- Recorded: January 1995
- Genre: Pop
- Length: 3:50
- Label: Org
- Songwriter: Tim Smith
- Producer: Tim Smith

Cardiacs singles chronology
"Day Is Gone" (1991)	"Bellyeye" (1995)	"Manhoo" (1995)

"Bellyeye" (Note: Written in The Quietus as "Belleye") is a song by the English rock band Cardiacs from their album Sing to God (1996). Written and produced by Cardiacs' leader, singer and guitarist Tim Smith, Org Records released it in association with the magazine The Organ as the album's first single on 17 April 1995 with "A Horse's Tail" and "No Gold". A Britpop-influenced pop song, "Bellyeye" features piano, drums, guitar and horns, and an ending extension with harpsichord and tambourine. The song's bass is melodic and Smith's vocal is clear, with dark lyrics on handling life's demands and the concept of saving or being saved.

Reviewers viewed "Bellyeye" as a straighter pop song from Sing to God that retained the album's particular production and arrangement, and complimented the song's euphoria and bombast whilst drawing comparison to the band Blur, fans of Cardiacs who Cardiacs opened for and influenced. The song's limited single is rare, with some containing a promotional sticker from Cardiacs' tour opening for Blur selling for more due to their rarity.

== Background and release ==
Rough Trade went bankrupt the week Cardiacs' previous album, Heaven Born and Ever Bright (1992), was released, leaving the band in debt due to the album being impossible to find in record shops. The magazine The Organ put on a couple of gigs that proved that the band's huge underground audience would still fill places like The Venue. Despite the setback, Cardiacs' leader, singer, main songwriter and guitarist Tim Smith said he had "a hundred songs written", leading to Organ using three as the "Bellyeye" EP to release on their label Org, a long-time Cardiacs supporter, after a long gap between Cardiacs albums.

Org Records released "Bellyeye" as a limited single with "A Horse's Tail" and "No Gold" on 17 April 1995 in association with the Organ magazine, The songs were recorded "in Wintery January 1995 in the Dark." "Bellyeye" was technically the first single from Sing to God before the band officially released "Manhoo" and "Odd Even" on the Alphabet Business Concern label. The single came with a promotional sticker from Cardiacs' tour opening for Blur, who were fans of the band. Like other Org Records singles, the "Bellyeye" release experienced the fate of being rare, with singles with the sticker selling for more due to their rarity. "Bellyeye" was included as the eighth track on Part One of Sing to God, released on 10 June 1996 by the Alphabet Business Concern.

== Composition and reception ==
In his book Cardiacs: Every Album, Every Song, Eric Benac says "Bellyeye" "showcases Tim's strong pop songwriting instincts and his love of dark lyrics". Benac opined that the production and arrangement of "Bellyeye" "could only have come from this particular Cardiacs album", but that the song is "poppier and straighter than normal" and "wouldn't be out of place on a Blur album." Benac noted the song's melodic bass and "clear and easy to follow" vocals by Tim Smith. Regarding the song's lyrics, which contain the concept of saving or being saved, Benac suggests the singer is "a troubled person" at wit's end who "can't seem to handle life's demands" and "always looking out for people in trouble with an 'Acme Thunderer Blaster' to help", tying the idea of a saviour to a superhero or "that of the comic book shaped cruisaders". The ending of the track is an extension of the core elements with "harpsichord, tambourine and an oddly-treated guitar". An alleged demo uploaded to YouTube has an arrangement of mostly piano and drums with light guitar and some horns, which Eric Benac said "isn't as rich as the album version". He noted that Tim Smith's "chords and playing obviously influenced the final take."

In a review of the 2014 release of Sing to God by Sam Shepherd of MusicOMH, Shepherd called "Bellyeye" an example of Tim Smith's "keen pop nous" which, along with "Manhoo" illustrates the debt that Blur owe Cardiacs. The Quietus's Sean Kitching said the song "clearly illustrates why Cardiacs were such an influence on bands like Blur to begin with", calling it "Smith's attempt at a slightly straighter pop song – totally euphoric like filling the cup of joy until it’s completely overflowing". Punknews.org called "Bellyeye," a catchy "Britpop-influenced tune which feels much like something Blur would perform if Damon Albarn was in the midst of a nervous breakdown". Describing the single release, Org Records said "Where do you think Mr. Bungle, Blur or a million others get all their best ideas?" The Guardian's Pete Cashmore called "Bellyeye" one of "Cardiacs’ most sensible moments" along with "Is This the Life" and "Feeding the Plankton", opining that a compilation of such moments "would be a pure pop classic". Marco Sgrignoli of the Italian music publication Ondarock called "Bellyeye" a "kaleidoscopic and bombastic" composition, "fatally catchy" despite its "stainless obliquity".

== Track listing ==
- CD single
1. "Bellyeye" (Tim Smith) – 3:50
2. "A Horse's Tail" (Jon Poole) – 3:48
3. "No Gold" (Smith) – 3:32

== Personnel ==
Credits adapted from the liner notes of the "Bellyeye" single.

- Jim Smith – bass, vocals
- Tim Smith – guitar, keyboards, vocals
- Jon Poole – guitar, keyboards, vocals
- Bob Leith – drums, vocals

with:

- Sarah Smith – massive saxes (tracks 1 and 2), singing (track 1)

String quartet on track 3

- Chris Brierley – violin
- Catherine Morgan – violin
- Mark Pharoah – viola (Note: Credited Mark Pharaoh on the Sing to God album)
- Robert Woollard – cello

Technical

- Produced by Tim Smith

Visual

- Marina – artwork, photographs
- James @ Filter – layout
