= Cay (band) =

English rock band

- Origin: Camden Town, London, England
- Genre: Alternative Rock
- Years active: c. 1998–2000
- Labels: Org Records, EastWest
- Past members: Anet Mook; Nicky Olofsson; Tom Harrison; Mark Bullock; Chris Hall; Jonny Nothard; Ed Sonsino

Cay were an English alternative rock band based in London containing members from the Netherlands, Sweden, England and Northern Ireland who were active in the late 1990s. The band released one album and recorded several radio sessions for the BBC.

== History ==
Cay formed in Camden Town, London in the mid-1990s around the nucleus of Dutch singer/rhythm guitarist Anet Mook and Swedish guitarist/pianist Nicky Olofsson, who were musical and romantic partners. The line-up solidified with the addition of London bass guitarist Tom Harrison and Northern Irish drummer Mark Bullock. The band name was hastily improvised from the initials of one of their demo tracks ("Cool As You") when Mook was talking to a record company.

"'Reasonable Ease...' is technically very variant with fast bits, slow bits, etc, but what we play within those parts is actually quite simple. On the other hand, a track like 'Better than Myself' is structurally very straightforward, but the parts we play that make up that structure are more technically difficult than a track that appears superficially to be pretty tricky. I guess it's safe to say that most of our songs are challenging in some way, even 'School' has a quirky time change throughout that means we can't fall asleep in the middle of it! In short, all our songs are fun to play. No-one ever complains that a part is boring for them to play, or if they do they get told to shut up and use their imagination to liven it up. I think that's what makes us a little bit better than a straightforward punk band."

— Cay drummer Mark Bullock on Cay’s technical approach to playing songs

Cay drew on a variety of influences, predominantly "punky, grungy" material such as Nirvana, Sonic Youth and the Sex Pistols (which, in tandem with Mook's hoarse and lacerating vocals, brought them comparisons to Hole which they ultimately found unwelcome). However, the band would also cite more diverse influences (such as Robert Fripp, or Mook's childhood love of diva singers including Diana Ross, Barbra Streisand and Billie Holiday). The band's approach was often more technically exploratory than many of their peers, leading to further comparisons with bands such as Gang of Four and Nomeansno.

Cay's first release was the Better Than Myself EP, released on Org Records in 1998, with the band's first Peel Session for BBC Radio 1 being broadcast on 20 September. The single and session (and the band's appearance at that year's in the City music festival in Manchester) attracted the attention of various record labels including EastWest Records, who signed the band. Two further singles followed on EastWest in early 1999 - "Neurons Like Brandy" and "Princes & Princesses" – with the band gaining further press attention. NME reviewed a London gig in January commenting that "Cay are simply following in that great Camden tradition of stealing what's best from America and coating it in north London grime."

Cay's debut (and only) album, Nature Creates Freaks was released in July 1999. Reviews were favourable, with the band being compared to the likes of Sonic Youth, Robert Fripp and the Breeders with NME commenting "this is the album (which Hole's) Celebrity Skin should have been. It's the most genuinely angry album you'll hear this year," as well as describing the band's sound as being "like the devil's own daughter gargling razor blades over the rawest hardcore." The album was followed by a third EastWest single, also called "Nature Creates Freaks". On 3 June 1999, the band recorded its second Peel Session (this time in the "Nearly Live" sequence) at the Queen Elizabeth Hall as part of the Sound City events. The band also won the Best British Newcomer award at the 1999 Kerrang! Awards.

"Just as the criminally underrated Silverfish did in the early-'90s, Cay sink their teeth into the devil's own blues and spit it out in ragged chunks of molten grunge. Tonight's gig is an almost primordial rampage over a wasteground of tumbling, speed-crazed tribal drumming and jittery super-fuzzed guitars… If Cay add little that's new to the great scheme of things, it matters not; for one night only the gutter finds its voice and does its damnedest to spew dirty garage punk filth over as wide an area as possible... the next explosion is only ever seconds away and 'Nature Creates Freaks' churns through a mess of scrag-end punk like a tractor ploughing a field of broken glass. Cay aren't going to save rock'n'roll but, like Idlewild, they make it seem nasty, noisy and fun again. Now wash your hands please."

— NME reviews a Cay concert in early 1999

Despite Cay's early promise, the band had by now become dogged by substance abuse and infighting which ultimately disrupted their activities and career to such an extent that by the following year the band had been dropped by both their label and their management. In April 2000, both Bullock and Harrison left the band.

Mook and Olofsson recruited a new rhythm section for Cay (Chris Hall on drums and Ed Sonsino on bass guitar) and returned to Org Records, who issued their final single "Resurrexit". The single received airplay on Radio 1 and the band played at the Glastonbury festival on 23 June (with their performance being recorded for a third Peel Session, broadcast the following day), followed by an appearance at Guildford Live Festival in July. However, the band's internal problems remained unresolved. After a final Peel Session recording on 22 November 2000 (broadcast on 5 December) featuring four new songs – "Sun Through the Rain", "Flying Fools Through Icy Attitudes", "FUNY (A Celebration of New York)" and "Part of the Show" - Cay simply disappeared.

There was no formal notification of a split and the Cay songs unveiled in the final Peel Session were never released. The band's former drummer Mark Bullock would go on to play on Feeder's Australian tour in 2000 (he would also play on the band's Top of the Pops performance of the "Just A Day" single in late 2001). Despite ongoing curiosity about the whereabouts of Anet Mook and Nicky Olofsson, or news of subsequent musical projects, further news on either was rare (or insubstantial) over the course of the following decade.

On 15 June 2011, Org Records founder Sean Organ announced on his Organart site that he had been informed in an e-mail from Mark Bullock of Anet Mook's death. Mook had been struck by a moving vehicle in the Netherlands. On 16 June 2011, Mark Bullock confirmed in his blog, "Sink of Swirling Stars", that Mook had died the previous week, adding that she had struggled with drug addiction for many years. Bullock later clarified the cause of Mook's death by stating that she was struck by a train and was sober and of sound mind at the time. Her funeral was held on the day of Bullock's posting.

== Discography ==
=== Singles ===
- Better Than Myself EP (1998) Org Records
- "Neurons Like Brandy" (1999) EastWest UK No. 78
- "Princes & Princesses" (1999) EastWest UK No. 77
- "Nature Creates Freaks" (1999) EastWest UK No. 93
- "Resurrexit" (2000) Org Records

=== Albums ===
- Nature Creates Freaks (1999) EastWest UK No. 197
