= Cardiacs =

English rock band

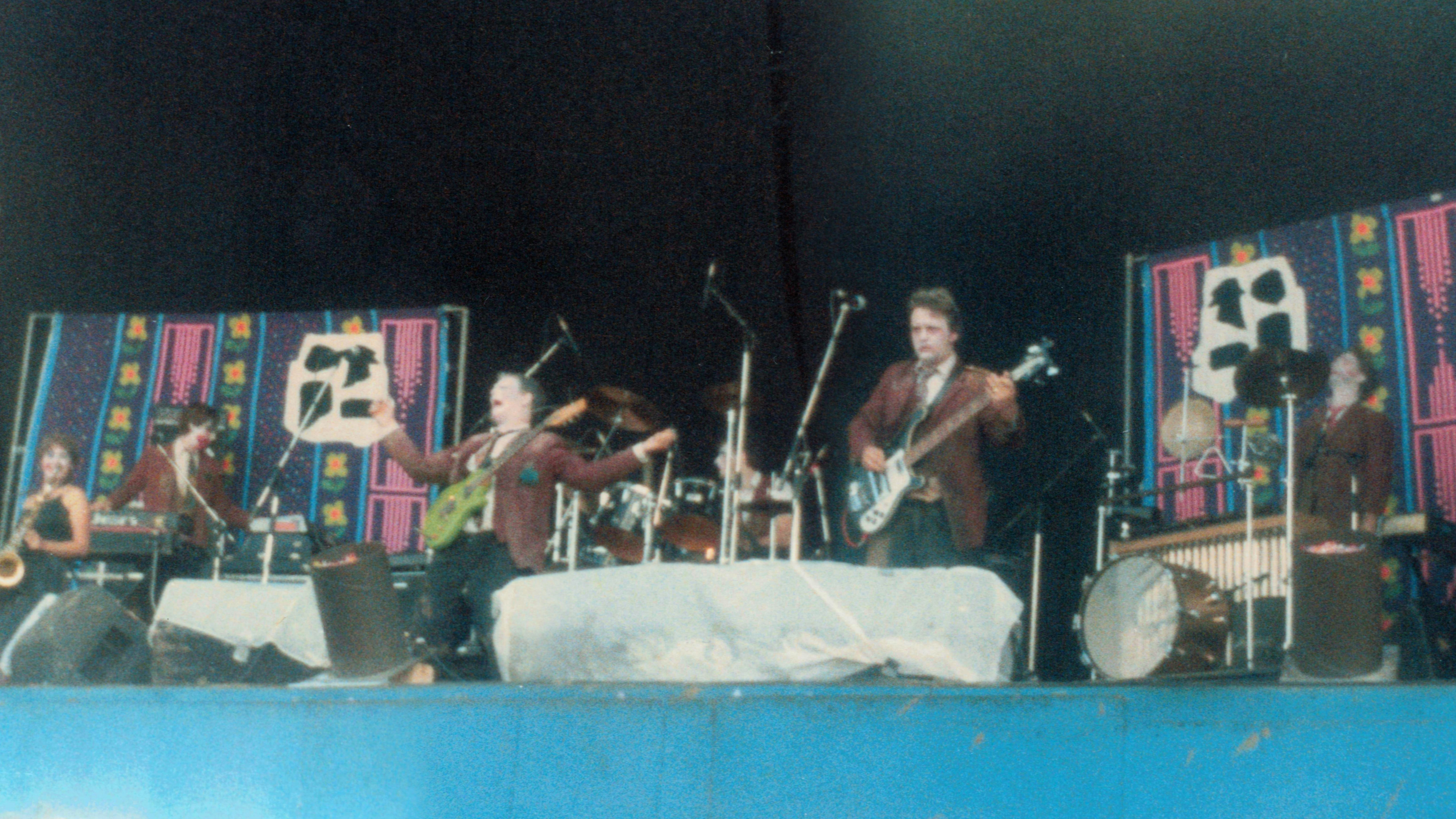
- Cardiacs live at Reading Rock Festival 1986

Background information
- Also known as: The Filth (1977–1978); Cardiac Arrest (1978–1980)
- Origin: Kingston upon Thames, England
- Genres: Art rock; progressive punk; psych rock; avant-punk; art pop
- Works: Discography; songs
- Years active: 1977–2008; 2021–present
- Labels: Tortch; Alphabet; Torso; Strange Fruit; Org; Melodic Virtue
- Spinoffs: Mr & Mrs Smith & Mr Drake; The Grown-Ups; Sea Nymphs; Panixphere; Spratleys Japs
- Members: Jim Smith; Bob Leith; Kavus Torabi; Sharron Fortnam; Craig Fortnam; Chloe Herington; Mike Vennart; Rhodri Marsden
- Past members: Tim Smith; Michael Pugh; Peter Tagg; Colvin Mayers; Ralph Cade; Mark Cawthra; Sarah Smith; Tim Quy; Dominic Luckman; William D. Drake; Graham Simmonds; Marguerite Johnston; Christian Hayes; Jon Poole; Cathy Harabaras; Claire Lemmon; Dawn Staple; Melanie Woods; Jane Kaye
- Website: cardiacs.net

Cardiacs (Note: sometimes also referred to as the Cardiacs) are an English rock band formed in Kingston upon Thames by guitarist and primary songwriter Tim Smith and his brother, bassist Jim Smith, in 1977 under the name Cardiac Arrest. (Note: The band was initially formed as the Filth before changing their name to Cardiac Arrest. Performing under the name until 1980, the group went through a number of name changes before settling on simply Cardiacs in 1981.) One of Britain's leading cult rock bands, their sound folds in genres including art rock, jazz, psychedelia and metal, which was topped by Tim Smith's anarchic vocals and hard-to-decipher lyrics. He was noted for his complex and innovative compositional style; Cardiacs have been credited with fusing circus, baroque pop and medieval music with progressive rock and post-punk. The band's theatrical performance style has often incorporated off-putting costumes with on-stage confrontations. Their sound and image has sometimes made them unpopular with the press, but they have amassed a devoted following and inspired many rock groups, including Blur.

During the band's first decade, they self-released a series of demo cassette tapes with DIY production values: The Obvious Identity (1980), Toy World (1981), and The Seaside (1984). From 1984 to 1989, following several personnel changes, Cardiacs settled on a six-piece lineup comprising Tim, Jim and saxophonist Sarah Smith, percussionist Tim Quy, drummer Dominic Luckman and keyboardist William D. Drake. They created their own indie label, the Alphabet Business Concern, and developed an absurdist mythology as well as a live show involving uniforms, smeared clown-like makeup, and on-stage confrontations. Their debut album A Little Man and a House and the Whole World Window (1988) found mainstream exposure with the single "Is This the Life" and was followed by On Land and in the Sea in 1989. With the addition of guitarist Christian Hayes and the departures of Sarah Smith, Quy, and Drake, Cardiacs slimmed to a four-piece and displayed a harder edged, metal-leaning sound by 1992's Heaven Born and Ever Bright which was retained for their subsequent albums. Meanwhile, the spin-off group the Sea Nymphs comprising Tim, Sarah and Drake recorded an album of the same name.

After guitarist and keyboardist Jon Poole and drummer Bob Leith, both formerly of the progressive pop band Ad Nauseam, replaced Hayes and Luckman in 1991 and 1993, the quartet released the albums Sing to God (1996) and Guns (1999). Beginning with the Special Garage Concerts shows in 2003, Kavus Torabi replaced Poole on guitar, and the band toured from 2004 to 2007 with an expanded lineup of additional singers and percussionists. In 2008, Tim Smith was abruptly hospitalised with dystonia resulting from a cardiac arrest and stroke, which caused the band to go on indefinite hiatus but also brought increased critical recognition, with several music outlets calling Sing to God a masterpiece. (Note: See Sing to God#Retrospective assessment) His death in 2020 saw a raft of tributes on social media. In 2021, Cardiacs' music appeared on streaming services and the band continued the recording of their sixth album LSD, which was released in 2025. As Cardiacs Family & Friends, band members performed the music of Tim Smith at several tribute shows entitled Sing to Tim in 2024, and a new lineup of Cardiacs played live dates in 2026 with Mike Vennart as lead singer.

== History ==
=== 1977–1984: Early years ===
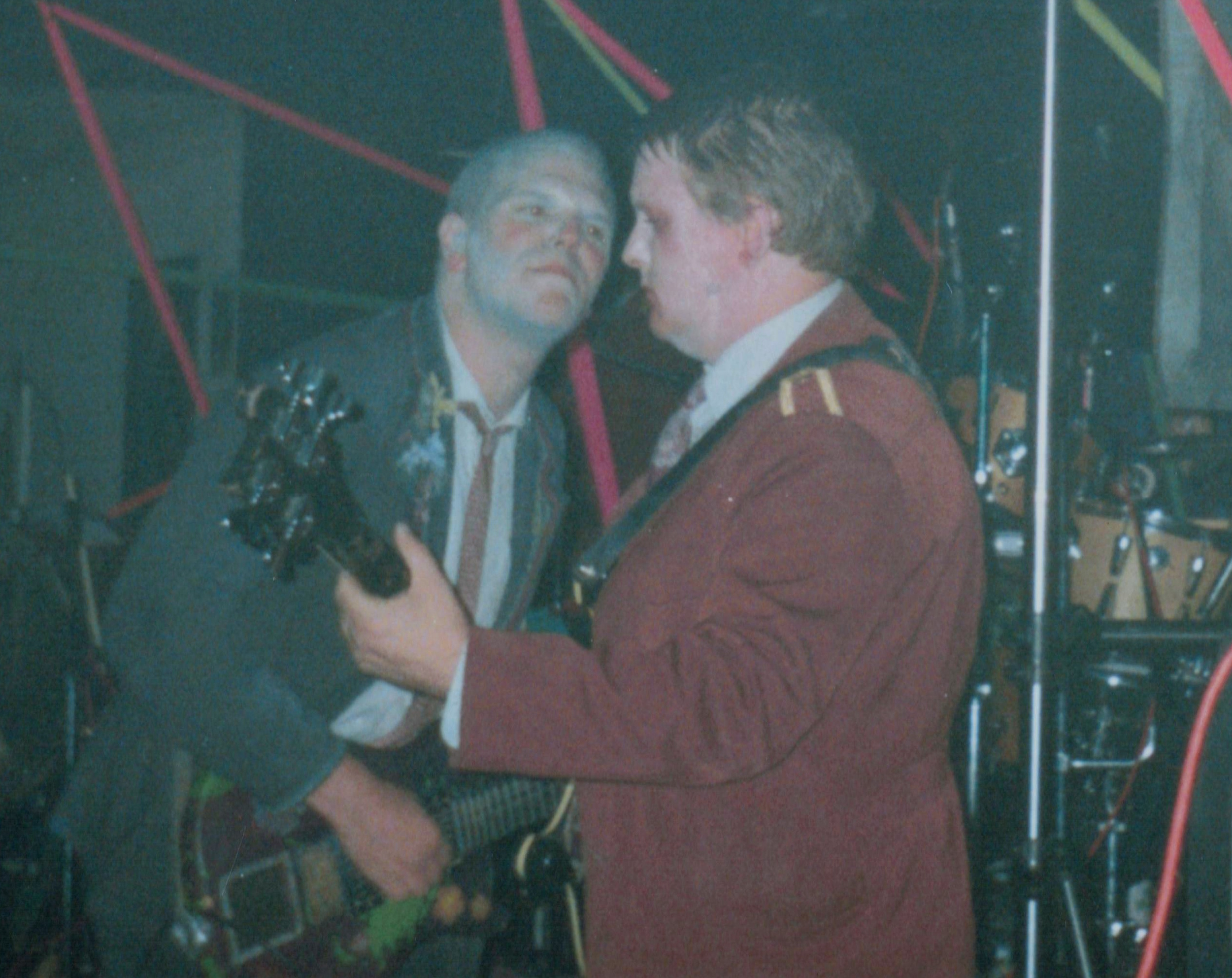
Brothers Tim and Jim Smith co-founded the band and were the sole constant members.

Cardiacs originated in Kingston upon Thames, Surrey, in the late 1970s. Frontman Tim Smith began his musical career in 1975 after forming a nameless band at school in which he played guitar. Smith played his first gig at Surbiton Assembly Rooms aged 16 alongside Adrian Borland of the Outsiders and drummer Bruce Bisland as Gazunder. The Cardiacs biography describes their two gigs in 1976 as sounding "a bit like the rocky instrumental bits" on David Bowie's The Man Who Sold the World (1970). The band that would become Cardiacs was formed in late 1977 by Smith and his brother Jim on bass guitar and backing vocals, alongside Michael Pugh on lead vocals and Peter Tagg on drums. The project was initially called the Filth, but soon changed their name to Cardiac Arrest, possibly by their second gig in 1978 according to Tagg. According to the official history, Tim Smith formed the band merely to punish his brother "for all the unkind things he would do to him as an infant", as Jim allegedly couldn't play an instrument.

Cardiac Arrest produced a demo in 1977, and released their debut single "A Bus for a Bus on the Bus" in 1979 under Tortch Records. Peter Tagg and Ralph Cade decamped from Cardiacs and formed the Trudy. Tim Smith, the primary lyricist, initially took on guitar and backing vocal duties before Pugh's departure saw him promoted to frontman. Cardiac Arrest followed the single with a full-length cassette release titled The Obvious Identity in 1980, which was released at around 1000 copies exclusively sold at concerts. Shortly after, the group went through a number of name changes, settling on simply Cardiacs in 1981. They held their first concert under the new name in April.

In 1981, Cardiacs self-released the cassette album, Toy World, featuring both new material and recordings dating back to the Cardiac Arrest period. (Consequently, some tracks featured Michael Pugh as lead singer rather than Tim Smith). During 1981, Colvin Mayers left the band to join the Sound, a group led by Borland. Sarah Cutts briefly covered live keyboards as well as saxophone, before Mark Cawthra swapped drums for keyboards and Dominic Luckman was recruited from the road crew as the new drummer. At around the same time percussionist Tim Quy became a full-time member (also doubling on bass synthesizer). In July 1983, Tim Smith married Sarah Cutts – taking his surname, she was henceforward known as Sarah Smith.

In mid-1983 Mark Cawthra left the band, to be replaced on keyboards by William D. Drake. Tim Smith had previously met Drake in 1982 at the debut performance of Drake's band Honour Our Trumpet (who promptly invited him to join as bass guitarist.) Following Cawthra's departure, Smith returned Drake's favour by inviting him to join Cardiacs. Drake played his first concert with the band on 31 August 1983. Later in the year, Cardiacs added Marguerite Johnston (alto saxophone) and Graham Simmonds (guitar), and for about a year the band worked as an octet. Both Johnston and Simmonds left during the following summer (in July and August respectively), although Simmonds stayed on as Cardiacs' sound engineer.

=== 1984–1989: The "classic lineup" established ===
==== The Seaside and Seaside Treats ====
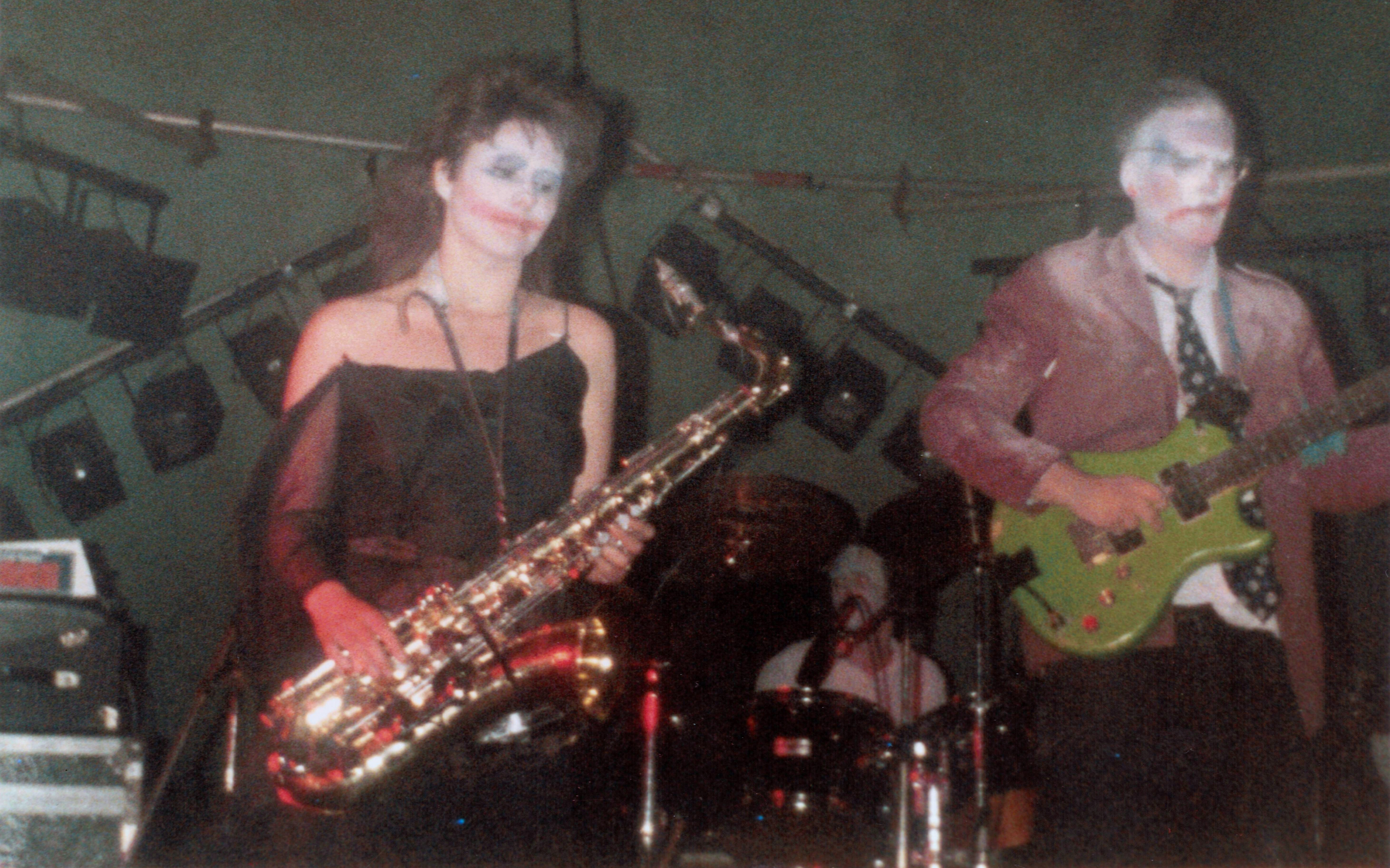
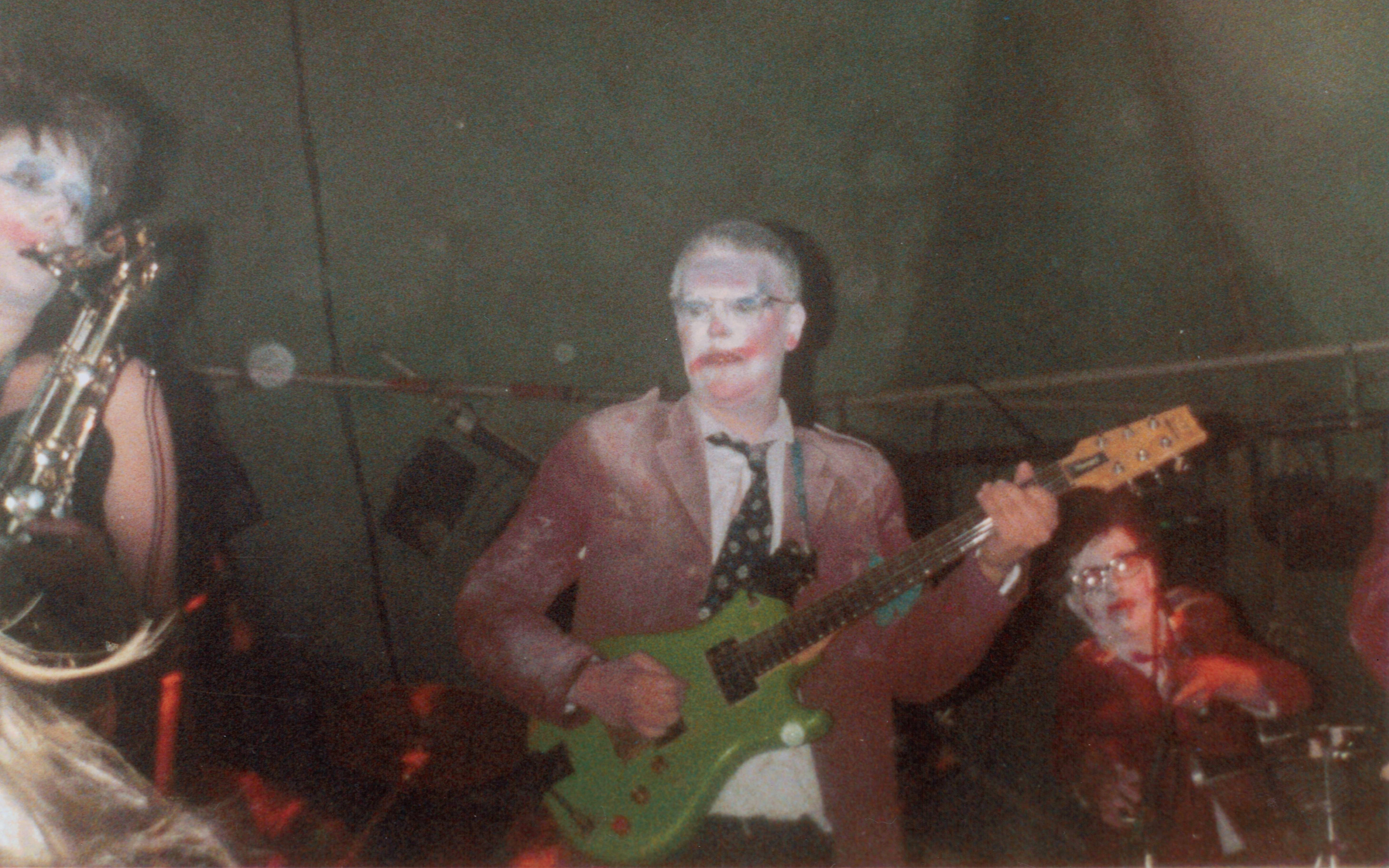
Cardiacs performing at Oxford Festival in 1986

By autumn 1984, the band lineup had settled as the sextet generally referred to as "the classic lineup" – Tim Smith (lead vocals and guitar), Jim Smith (bass and vocals), William D. Drake (keyboards and vocals), Sarah Smith (saxophones and vocals), Tim Quy (percussion and keyboards) and Dominic Luckman (drums). The first Cardiacs release featuring the "classic" lineup was their third album, The Seaside (although Cawthra featured throughout on drums, keyboards and voice; and Simmonds and Johnston also appeared on several tracks). The album was released on Cardiacs own record label, Alphabet (which later became Alphabet Business Concern). The bizarre and sinister "Alphabet Business Concern" mythology now began to become a significant part of Cardiacs' artistic presentation, and the band members would promote and add to it at every opportunity. The band evolved an elaborate and theatrical stage show, involving off-putting "bandsmen's uniforms, makeup, Sarah's music stand, [and] Tim's mile-wide grin".

A lot of people find our act disturbing because it brings out something in you that a lot of people won't admit to. It's the weirdness in everyone whether you like it or not. Some people think it's dead funny, others hate it. It's strange when people hate us—they really do hate us, it brings out something odd in people.

— Tim Smith

Between 5 November – 21 December 1984, Cardiacs performed their first major British support tour, supporting Marillion at the personal invitation of Marillion's vocalist, Fish. Whilst the tour afforded the band a new level of publicity, generally they were not well received by Marillion's fanbase. On most dates of the tour, the band was pelted with a variety of makeshift missiles. During the 13 December show at the Hammersmith Apollo, Fish himself was indignant enough about the Marillion fans and their hostile behaviour to come onstage during Cardiacs' set and berate the audience about it. The band eventually ducked out of the last three days of the Marillion tour.

A Cardiacs spin-off project – Mr and Mrs Smith and Mr Drake – emerged in 1984 which featured Tim, Sarah and Drake and consisted of a quieter, more acoustically orientated take on Cardiacs' music. The project released a self-titled cassette album which was only available via the Cardiacs fan club. Another outgrowth of 1980s Cardiacs was the Grown-Ups, where Drake, Craig Fortnam, Luckman and Cawthra linked up with friends and produced "seriously strange" avant-pop.

Cardiacs writing logo

On 1 April 1985, an attempt was made to film Cardiacs at a live concert at the Surbiton Assembly Rooms. The band had been approached by film-maker Mark Francombe (later a member of Cranes) and his colleague Nick Elborough, both of whom were at that time students at Portsmouth College of Art and Design. Francombe and Elborough offered to film the band for free as part of their coursework project. However, when the band viewed the resultant footage, they decided against releasing it. Instead, they retained Francombe and Elborough for a new video project which would become Seaside Treats, named after the 12" single that was released at the same time. As well as containing three music videos, Seaside Treats contained a ten-minute film named The Consultant's Flower Garden. The latter featured Cardiacs (and various people connected with them) in bizarre, comedic situations which continued to propagate the absurdist Alphabet Business Concern mythology which surrounded the band.

==== Big Ship, A Little Man and a House & On Land and in the Sea ====
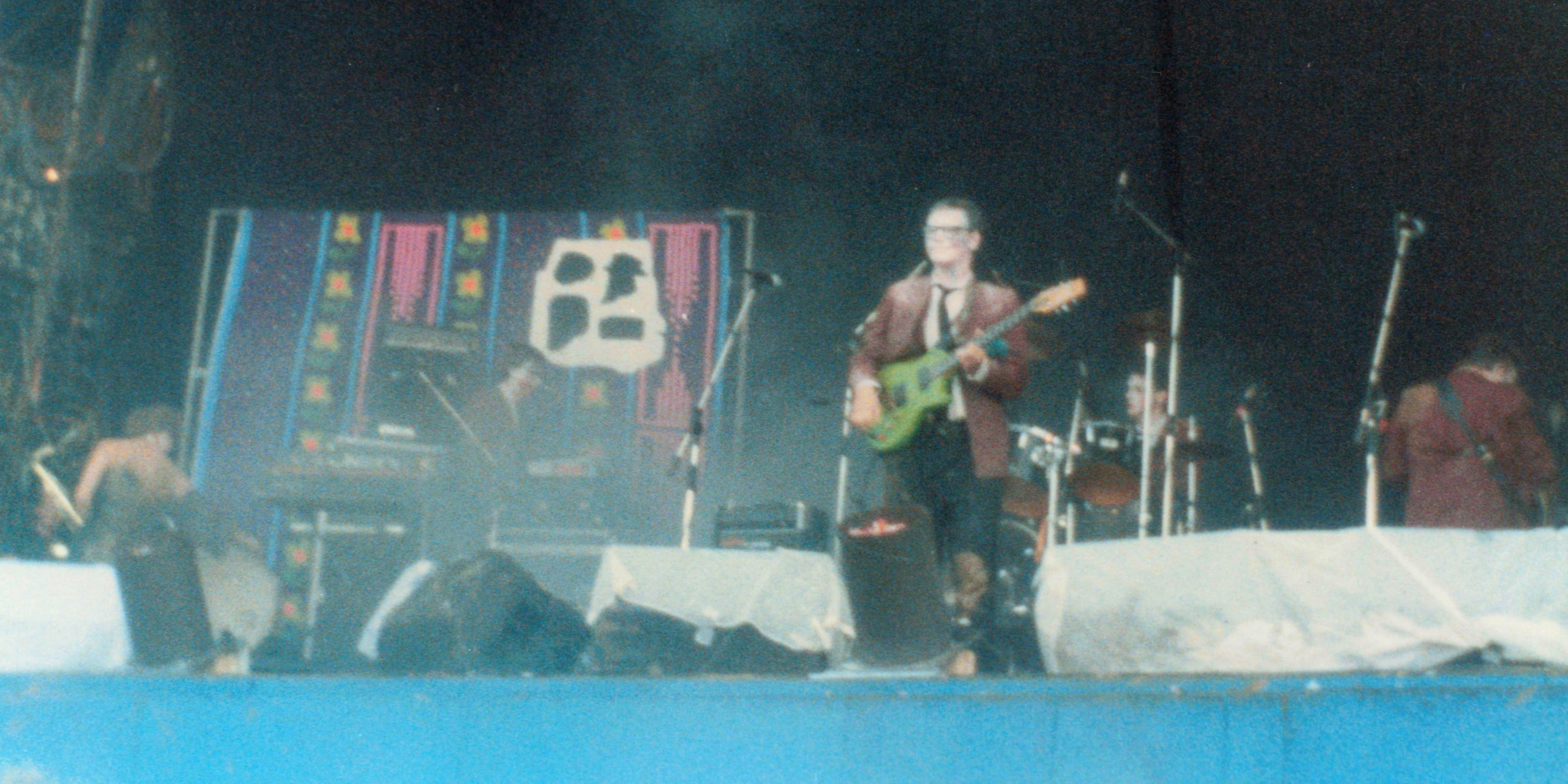
Cardiacs in 1986 performing at Reading Festival

Cardiacs played the Reading Festival on 24 August 1986, releasing the very rough audio footage as the Rude Bootleg album. On 27 January 1987, Cardiacs released the mini-album Big Ship, the first studio release by the sextet, to mixed reviews. The title track would prove to be one of their most enduring anthems.

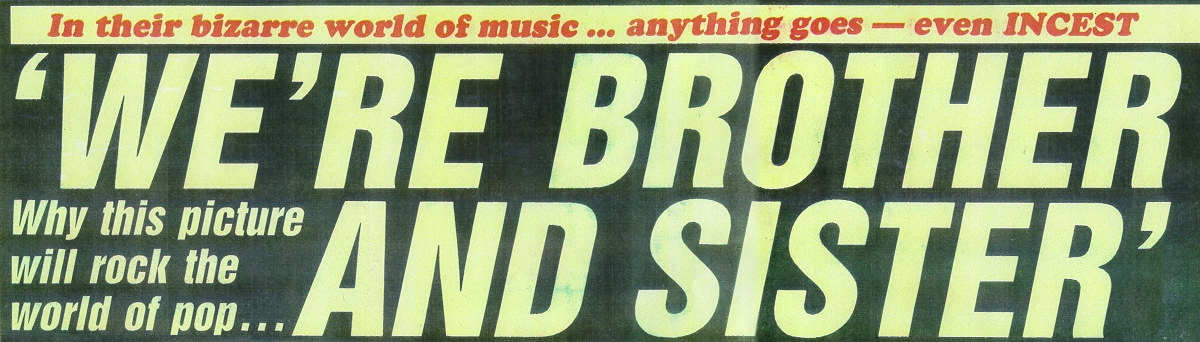
Headline in the Sunday Sport (falsely) accusing Tim and Sarah Smith of incest

In March 1987, the British tabloid newspaper Sunday Sport ran a story claiming to be an exposé and revealing the supposedly incestuous relationship between Tim Smith and Sarah Smith, in which the couple were portrayed as brother and sister. The headline ran, "In their bizarre world of music... anything goes – even incest." (The article ultimately debunked the story by including a corrective quote from Tim Smith's mother). Band manager Mark Walmesley is thought to have started the whole rumour to gain some publicity for the band, predating the superficially similar strategy later employed by the White Stripes twelve years later.

On 17 April, the band's music video for "Tarred and Feathered" (from the Big Ship mini-album) was broadcast on Channel 4's groundbreaking music show The Tube, giving Cardiacs their first exposure on national television. Later in the year, Cardiacs released a 12-inch single called "There's Too Many Irons in the Fire". In October, a live-in-the-studio session was recorded and broadcast by BBC Radio Leeds, followed in December by a similar session on BBC Radio 1 for Janice Long's Night Track show.

In 1988, Cardiacs released their debut studio album proper, A Little Man and a House and the Whole World Window. The single from the album, "Is This the Life", saw brief chart success due to exposure on mainstream radio, and garnered the attention of a wider audience when it entered the Independent Top 10 in the UK. The band followed up this burst of success with another single, a cover of the Kinks' "Susannah's Still Alive" with a video directed by Steve Payne. Strange Fruit Records also released a 12-inch vinyl EP of the band's BBC Radio 1 session from the previous year, under the title Night Tracks (The Janice Long Session). By this time, Cardiacs concerts were drawing hundreds of audience members and they were well on their way to becoming a hit underground band. On 15 May, the band played a concert at the Paradiso in Amsterdam, which was recorded for later release as Cardiacs Live.

Later in the year, Cardiacs recorded tracks for what would become their fifth studio album, On Land and in the Sea which was released in 1989. The album successfully consolidated the intricate style and unusual songwriting vision of A Little Man and a House..., but the stable lineup which the band had enjoyed for four years was now beginning to weaken.

=== 1989–2003: Classic lineup fractures and power quartet established ===
==== All That Glitters Is a Mares Nest and multiple departures ====
Over the following two years, the Cardiacs lineup began to disintegrate. Sarah Smith left the band suddenly in April 1989 and was not replaced, removing saxophone from the standard Cardiacs sound. Although Sarah would not rejoin the band, she would retain a long-term connection with Cardiacs by playing on future albums and would very occasionally appear as a special guest for live concerts. Tim Smith brought in a second guitarist – Christian 'Bic' Hayes, formerly of the Cardiacs-inspired Ring and the Dave Howard Singers – and the new two-guitar lineup toured extensively around the UK and Europe for the rest of the year (with Sarah Smith making the first of her special guest appearances at a Brixton Fridge concert on 17 September). During this period, the band also released Archive Cardiacs, a collection of material from the 1976–83 period (some of it previously unreleased).

Cardiacs toured and gigged intermittently during 1990, culminating in a shared concert with Napalm Death at Salisbury Arts Centre on 30 June. The Cardiacs half of the concert was filmed and released as the video Maresnest (produced by Steve Mallet and directed by Steve Payne, and eventually also released as the 1995 live album All that Glitters is a Mares Nest). The band performed as a seven-piece, with Sarah Smith making a one-day return as a band member. Although the concert has achieved legendary status amongst Cardiacs fans, it was problematic for the band. Among other things, Tim Smith's guitar fell apart and keys fell off Sarah Smith's saxophone. After the Salisbury concert, Tim Quy left the band to pursue other projects. He remained on good terms with the band and would later appear as a special guest during Cardiacs' 2001 Astoria gig.

The band was quiet for the first four months of 1991, during which time two more members departed. William D. Drake played his final concert with the band on 2 May at The Venue in New Cross (going on to join the band Nervous and, in 2001, embarking on a long-delayed solo career). Having joined up-and-coming indie-psychedelic band Levitation, Christian Hayes played his own final gig as a Cardiac in Oxford on 16 May: although Cardiacs and Levitation were friendly with each other and had even toured together, Hayes had finally found it impossible to balance the demands of both bands. Both Hayes and Drake would continue to be associated with Cardiacs, and would occasionally guest with the band at selected live concerts many years later.

Between 1991 and 1993, Tim Smith, Christian Hayes, and Jon Poole (with drumming by David Francolini) performed live shows in a revitalized lineup of Hayes' 80's band, Panixphere. The Cardiacs spin-off band performed Hayes' original material, the Tim Smith-penned "More Money Than God", various covers including Cardiacs, XTC, Ring, and Foetus songs, and raw versions of Jon Poole-penned tracks that would later be recorded for Sing to God.

==== Heaven Born and Ever Bright and the Rough Trade debacle ====
Remaining as a quartet of two guitars, bass and drums (with Christian Hayes being replaced as second guitarist by Jon Poole who had previously played with the Cardiacs-inspired Milton Keynes band Ad Nauseam), Cardiacs' live music shifted away from the wider instrumentation of the past and moved towards a more guitar-heavy, power-rock sound in line with the remaining quartet lineup, with additional keyboard and percussion parts recorded on backing tapes for the band to play over.

Before 1991 was over, the band had released the single "Day Is Gone" and played several concerts from October to December. This year also saw the release of Songs for Ships and Irons, which compiled material from the Big Ship mini-album plus various singles and EPs. The debut single of the Cardiacs spin-off the Sea Nymphs (previously Mr and Mrs Smith and Mr Drake), "Appealing to Venus", was a free bonus item with the first 500 copies of "Day Is Gone" and was subsequently sold through the fan club. The debut Sea Nymphs album, The Sea Nymphs, was released in 1992. Cardiacs remained active during 1992, touring frequently within the UK, including a double-headed tour with Levitation. On 4 June 1992 at the London Astoria, Cardiacs were supported by Radiohead.

Prior to the departure of Hayes, Cardiacs had recorded an album called Heaven Born and Ever Bright. This was released as the new Cardiacs album in the summer of 1992, the first fruit of a new distribution deal with Rough Trade Records. However, Rough Trade ceased trading shortly after the release of the album, and therefore it could neither be stocked nor ordered by record shops, leaving Cardiacs thousands of pounds in debt and unable to recoup their recording expenses.

By July 1993, long-time drummer Dominic Luckman had decided to quit, playing his last concert as a Cardiacs member on 20 July at Camden Palace, London. Luckman retained his connection with the band and would later make an appearance on stage during Cardiacs' 2001 Astoria show. In December 1993, Cardiacs revealed their new drummer, Jon Poole's former Ad Nauseam bandmate, Bob Leith. However, the following year proved to be Cardiacs' quietest year for a long time, with only four concerts played in total.

==== Sing to God & Guns ====
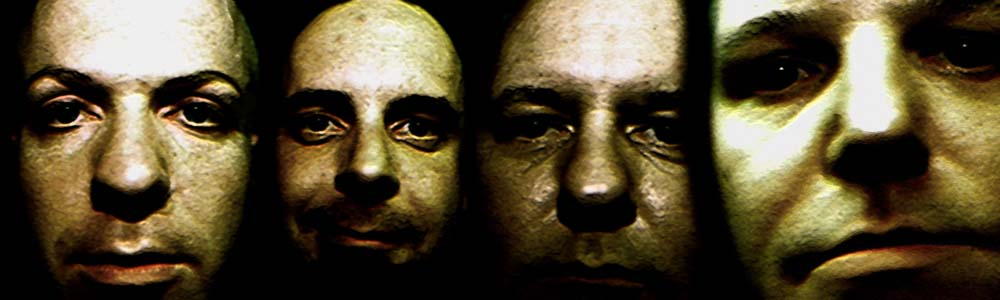
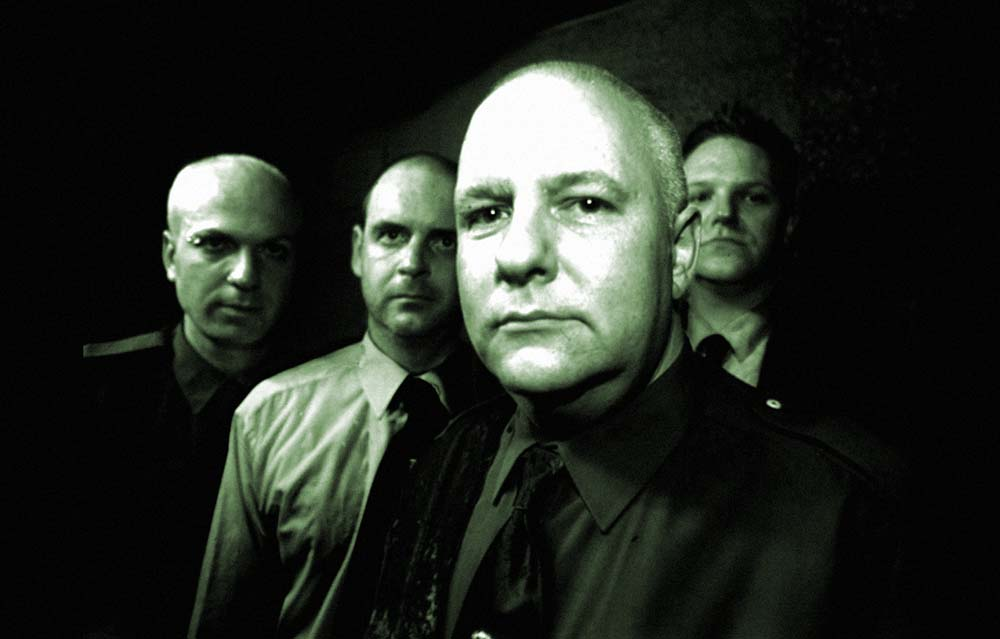
Cardiacs band photos

After three years without any new releases, 1995 saw the release of the "Bellyeye" single on Org Records (the record-releasing wing of long-term Cardiacs' supporters Organ Magazine). This was a taster for Cardiacs' most epic recorded effort to date. Sing to God was a double album, due to the sheer amount of material that Smith had written over a number of years. The album was notable for a change in Cardiacs' working methods – whereas most previous material had been written and arranged by Smith, the Sing to God sessions saw extensive contributions from Jon Poole who played a strong role in orchestrating Smith's basic material with detailed riffs and keyboard parts (and contributed several songs entirely written by himself). Drummer Bob Leith also made significant contributions to the album's lyrics.

Sing to God was released in two formats – as a limited edition double CD, and as two separate CDs. At the same time, the band reissued almost their entire back catalogue on CD. This constituted all of the albums from The Seaside onwards, CD issues of live album All that Glitters is a Mares Nest and the Archive Cardiacs compilation, and a new compilation, the Cardiacs Sampler.

In April 1995, Cardiacs performed a BBC Manchester radio session on Mark Radcliffe's show. During May, they toured with Pura Vida and Sidi Bou Said and recorded a live acoustic session for GLR Radio. On 17 June, they appeared as special guests of (and concert openers for) Blur at their triumphant London Mile End Stadium concert. From 31 October to 18 November, Cardiacs performed a long support stint on Chumbawamba's UK tour.

In June and November 1996, Cardiacs embarked on two UK tours of their own, most significantly filling the Astoria 2 on 2 November. The June tour was promoted by a second BBC Manchester radio session with Mark Radcliffe, aired on 11 June.

The next two years saw no new music from Cardiacs and reduced live activity. However, there were three more London concerts in 1998 – at one of these (the Garage concert on 4 December) the band was joined for an encore by William D. Drake. During the same year Cardiacs also played several performances in Germany and the Netherlands, and made appearances in Brighton and at a festival in St Austell in Cornwall. 1998 also saw renewed activity by the Sea Nymphs, with the "Appealing To Venus" single reissued with extra tracks by Org Records, and a rare concert at the Camden Falcon in north London.

At the start of 1999, Cardiacs played three nights in a row at the Camden Falcon, London between 29 and 31 January: on the final date, Sarah Smith and William D. Drake joined in for the encore. On 20 and 21 March the band played two concerts at the Garage with support from Dark Star (a new band featuring ex-Cardiac Christian Hayes) and Camp Blackfoot. Cardiacs toured the UK in June 1999 to support the release of their new album, Guns, described by some of the music press as being their most accessible album to date. The band performed another radio session on 13 June for "Inside Tracks" (on BBC Choice digital radio). Three more concerts followed in October.

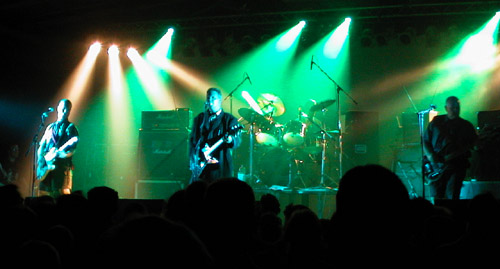
Cardiacs at Whitchurch Festival 2000

During 1999–2000, Cardiacs began work on a new studio album that remains incomplete and unreleased. Only one song slated for inclusion ("Faster Than Snakes With a Ball and a Chain") has ever been released to the public (it appears on the band's 2002 compilation Greatest Hits). Another song, the Jon Poole-penned "Silvery", appeared regularly in the band's live repertoire, and was later re-recorded by Jon Poole himself for the God Damn Whores' second album (albeit under the title "Sparkly Silver Sky"). While Tim Smith's given explanation for the album's nonappearance was that it had been rendered "broken" in some manner, bandmate Kavus Torabi has since stated that, while the band did record around this time, the concept of a "lost album" was apocryphal. Cardiacs concerts were rare over the next few years, although the band played the Glastonbury Festival on 23 June 2000 and played two subsequent Whitchurch Festivals on 5 August 2000 and 3 August 2001.

Counterbalancing the lack of tours, the band set up an annual tradition of one-off large-scale London concerts (the first of which took place on 11 November 2000 and the last in 2007). These usually took place in November at the London Astoria, and soon became a kind of Cardiacs family gathering in which the band was joined by various guests including former members and newer Cardiacs-inspired supported bands. During these concerts, Sarah Smith, William D. Drake, Christian Hayes and Dominic Luckman all appeared onstage with the band on various occasions, as did the Consultant and Miss Swift. Support bands were always musicians with a professed Cardiacs connection or influence, and included Oceansize, the Monsoon Bassoon, the Scaramanga Six, Stars in Battledress and Jon Poole's hard-rock band God Damn Whores.

=== 2003–2008: line-up changes and re-establishment ===
==== The Special Garage Concerts ====
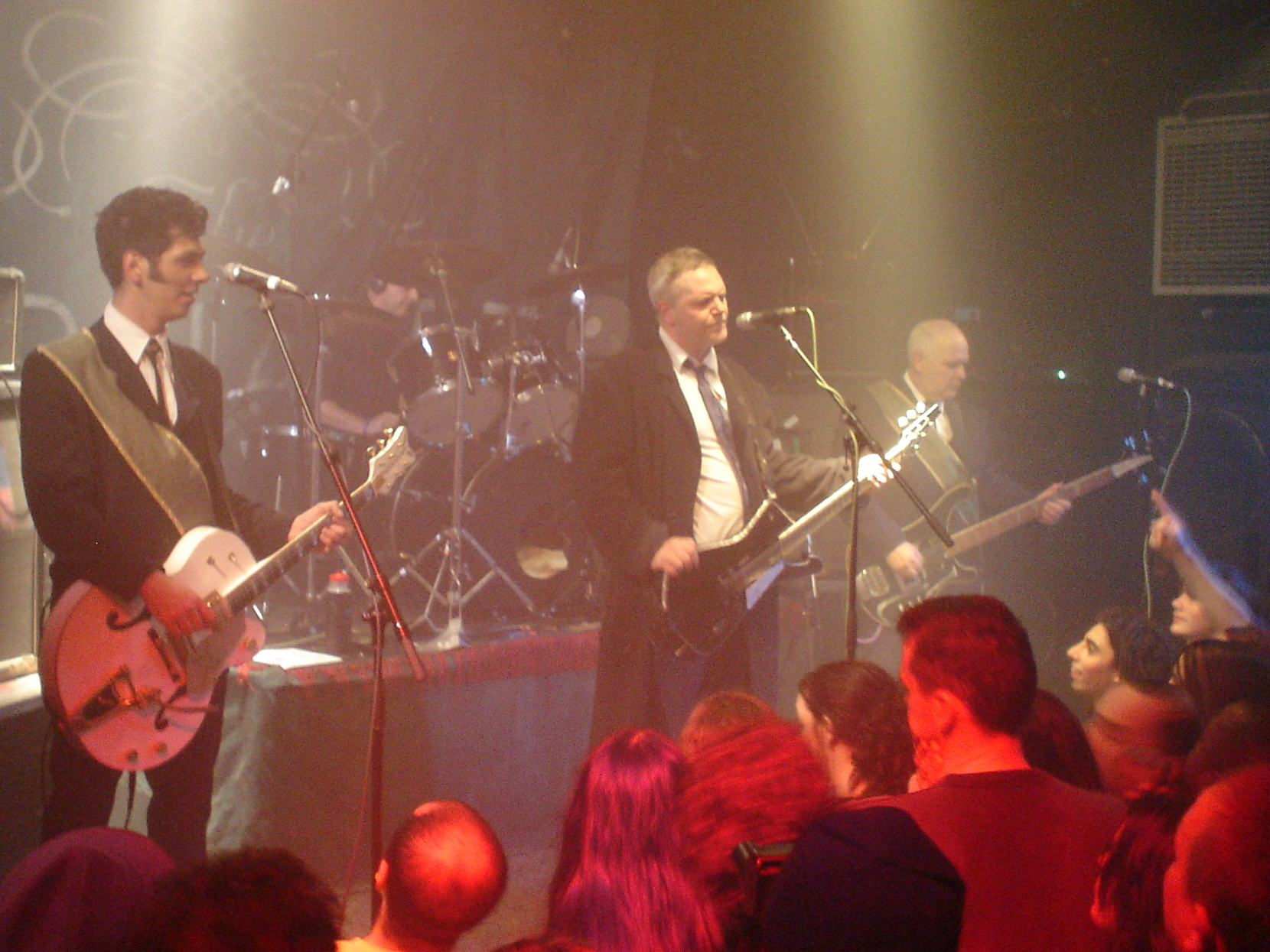
Cardiacs reprising the Garage Concerts set at the Bull and Gate in December 2005

Between 17 and 19 October 2003, Cardiacs recorded three special concerts at the Highbury Garage venue in London. As Jon Poole was by now also the bass player for the Wildhearts (and busy rehearsing for the upcoming Wildhearts tour) he was replaced for the concert by Kavus Torabi (formerly guitarist and singer for the Monsoon Bassoon, Torabi was also a long-standing Cardiacs associate who'd served as their guitar technician since the mid-1990s.)

For these concerts, the band exclusively played songs that had been performed prior to 1983. These were taken mostly from the band's cassette albums, but also included songs which had never been officially recorded before and had only ever been played at concerts. A two-volume CD set of recordings from the three shows – The Special Garage Concerts – was eventually released in 2005. Professional video camera equipment was apparently seen being used to record the band during the concerts, leading to a rumour that members of Org Records had filmed the entire three nights for later video release. This was debunked by Torabi in a 2009 interview, in which he stated that no such recordings existed. However, a static cam recording of one night was released by The Consultant.

==== Expanded line-ups and "Ditzy Scene" ====
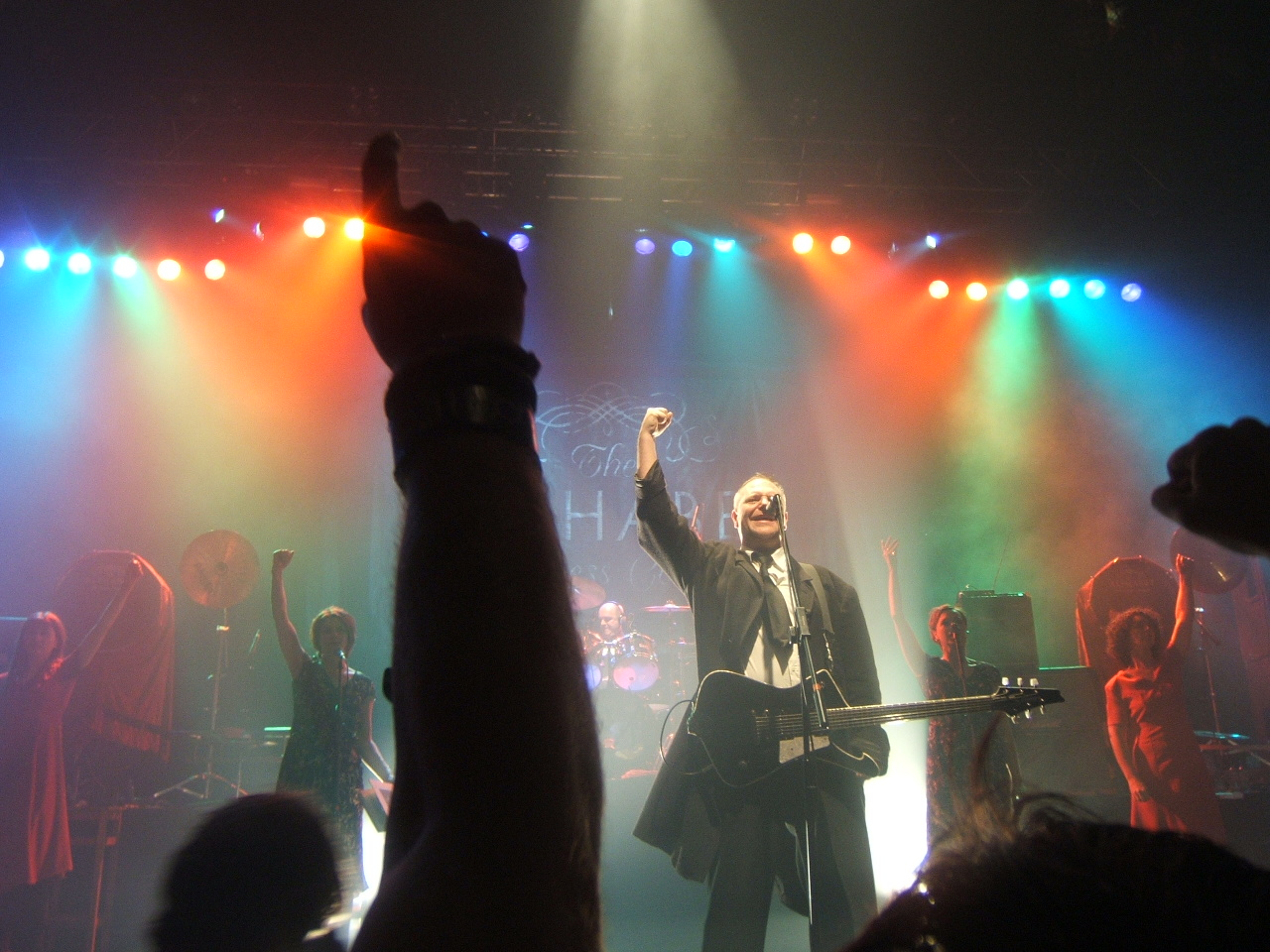
Cardiacs performing at the London Astoria in November 2005

In the autumn of 2004, Torabi officially replaced Poole as Cardiacs' second guitarist, and made his formal debut as a full group member at the annual London Astoria concert on 12 November (Poole would go on to concentrate on God Damn Whores, various Wildhearts-related projects, Crayola Lectern and others). This lineup performed classic songs on Radio2XS in December 2004 as part of the station's "Barn Sessions". A number of other new members were drafted into the Cardiacs lineup around the same time – three backing singers (Claire Lemmon and Melanie Woods of Sidi Bou Said, plus Shrubbies/North Sea Radio Orchestra singer Sharron Fortnam) and two percussionists – Cathy Harabaras and Dawn Staple – playing mostly bass drums.

After several years of limited live activity in front of established fans, Cardiacs made another attempt to recapture their momentum and play to fresh audiences by supporting long-terms fans the Wildhearts for the latter's tour between 8–15 December 2004. This tour saw another substitution – drummer Stephen Gilchrist (Graham Coxon, the Scaramanga Six, Stuffy/The Fuses) stood in for Bob Leith, who had previous tour commitments with art-punk band Blurt. Smith would later perform as a live acoustic trio with Ginger Wildheart and former Cardiac Jon Poole. Three more annual Astoria gigs were performed over the following three years (the 2005 edition having been professionally shot but left in an unedited state awaiting Tim Smith's involvement).

Cardiacs performed live radio sessions hosted by Marc Riley in October 2005 and June 2007.

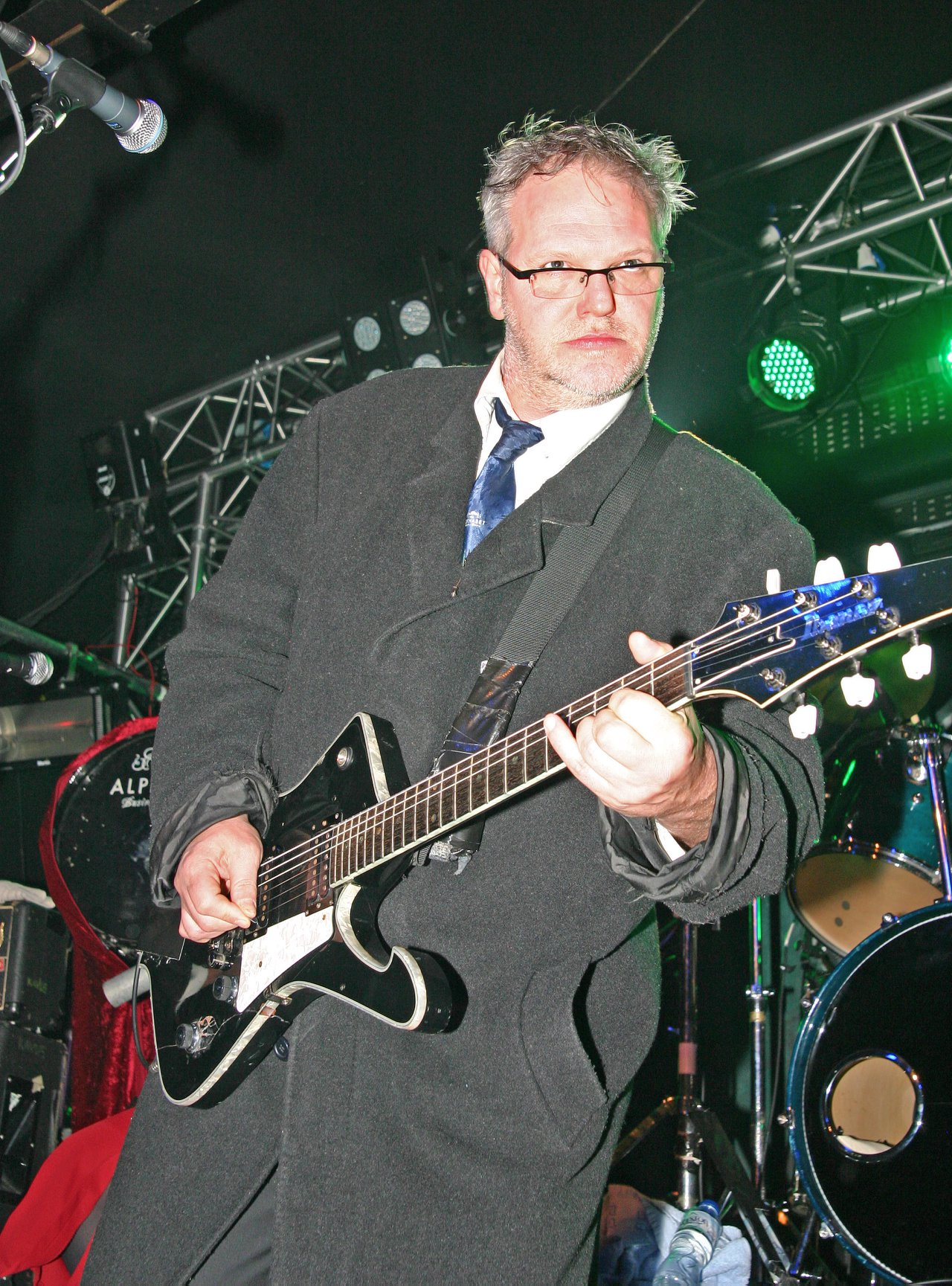
Smith with Cardiacs in 2007

On 5 November 2007, Cardiacs released their first new material for eight years. The "Ditzy Scene" single was released on Org Records as a limited edition of 1,000 copies, and featured the new line-up, albeit minus Sharron Fortnam. Heavily pre-ordered, the single featured two other new tracks "Gen" and "Made All Up", which teased Cardiacs' next planned project, a full album called LSD (intended as a double set, their second following Sing to God). (Note: Organ were initially unsure if the tracks would be on the album as they were promised a variety of old and new material and expected another single soon after.) On the release, Cardiacs biographer Adrian Bell comments "It's only when you become aware how insular the Alphabet Business Concern is that you realise the high regard they must have for The Organ".

Claire Lemmon and Dawn Staple had also left the active line-up by the time of the 2007 winter tour, on which Melanie Woods and Cathy Harabaras both doubled on percussion and singing. On the tour, Torabi recalled that "the crowds were getting bigger and younger and something was definitely happening", adding that Tim's brother and bass player Jim Smith said "something was in the air, that this might be our time." Cardiacs toured until the winter of 2007.

On 23 June 2008, the band performed three songs, including the unreleased live favorite "Silvery", live on Marc Riley's Brain Surgery. During an interview segment, Tim Smith revealed the band's plans for the rest of the year: a DVD release of All That Glitters is a Mares Nest, the release of LSD and two accompanying singles, another Marc Riley session and a fall tour supporting the new album.

=== 2008–2023: Lengthy hiatus, illness and death of Tim Smith, and side activities ===
==== Tim Smith's heart attack ====
At the end of June 2008, Tim Smith collapsed from a cardiac arrest after leaving a My Bloody Valentine concert. This led to hypoxic brain damage, leaving Smith severely debilitated by the rare condition dystonia. All Cardiacs-related releases and activity (including the work-in-progress for the unfinished LSD) were immediately shelved until further notice. A year of silence followed during which Smith recuperated in private. In June 2009, a new announcement appeared on the official Cardiacs website, letting readers know that, after a year of rehabilitation, Tim Smith's mind had returned to full functionality and that "no part of your favourite pop star's intellect or personality has been found to be absent whatsoever." It thanked fans for their kind thoughts and made clear Smith's interest in returning to playing music with Cardiacs at such time as his physical rehabilitation allowed. However, it became clear that such rehabilitation would be a long process; and in August 2010, Kavus Torabi stated in an interview podcast that Cardiacs would never play live again.

==== Fundraisers and related activities ====
In December 2010, two tribute CDs, Leader of the Starry Skies: A Tribute To Tim Smith, Songbook 1 and its limited edition companion Leader of the Starry Skies - A Loyal Companion, were compiled by former Cardiac Christian Hayes and former Spratleys Japs singer Jo Spratley. These were released on Kavus Torabi's record label Believers Roast, with all proceeds going directly to the continuing care of Tim Smith. The albums featured cover versions of Smith-penned material (originally for Cardiacs, the Sea Nymphs, Spratleys Japs and Smith's solo album OceanLandWorld) by musicians including the Magic Numbers, Steven Wilson, Oceansize, Robert White/Andy Partridge, Sidi Bou Said and North Sea Radio Orchestra as well as former Cardiacs including Hayes himself (as Mikrokosmos), Torabi (as Knifeworld), William D. Drake, Mark Cawthra and Peter Tagg (with the Trudy).

In 2013, after a long period of radio silence, the official Cardiacs website relaunched with many pieces of merchandise for sale, including a DVD release of All That Glitters is a Mares Nest. In the coming years, various Cardiacs releases would and continue to be added to the online shop, most notably a 2015 The Seaside boxset containing the original album remastered and with the original four "missing" tracks restored, as well as various supplementary material related to the era.

In 2013 and 2015 events dubbed "The Alphabet Business Convention" were held in celebration of, and with all proceeds going towards, Tim Smith's rehabilitation. They featured Cardiacs-related groups in performance such as Knifeworld, William D. Drake, and Redbus Noface, and were attended by Smith himself. Several smaller benefit concerts were held from time to time in this period and moving forward.

In a 2016 feature via The Quietus, Kavus Torabi shed light on several past, present, and future Cardiacs projects.

It was an extraordinarily interesting and brilliant time for me because we'd already talked a great deal about what the plan was for the next few years for Cardiacs. We were going to make a film. Tim and I were planning out loads of treatments and scripts. Tim wanted to share the burden of Cardiacs a bit with someone and I was more than happy to do that. The way things stand, [LSD] is nearly done but needs vocals and eyebrows and some of them need a few other touches. What there is does sound great but there's far more stuff completed that hasn't come out yet, that needs to come out. Tim is a perfectionist, and rightly so. Because his melodies make so much sense of everything, it would be ridiculous to put out these recordings, as exciting as they are, without the melodies. We have talked about people who Tim would approve of adding vocals, under his direction. I think Tim just wants to be well enough to really be producing it. I think his big drive at the moment is to finish off things that were started. There are a lot of loose ends that need tying up.

Jos Zwaanenburg, a Senior lecturer at the Conservatorium van Amsterdam, visited Tim Smith in Salisbury in October 2016 and was permitted to perform the previously unreleased Cardiacs piece "Pod" with his Zappa CS Ensemble at CvA.

The second Sea Nymphs album On the Dry Land was released in 2016 thanks to a turn for the better in Tim Smith's health; he was able to return to the studio to supervise production and additional recording necessary to the album's completion between 2015 and 2016. In an interview with Uncut, Smith said that even more Sea Nymphs material will be released at some point. He also stated that he was "deeply touched" by the efforts of those who had contributed toward the Cardiacs tribute album, Leader of the Starry Skies (the sales of which went directly toward rehabilitating Smith) and that he had since "made a pledge to [him]self to get better".

In December 2016 Tim, Sarah, and William D. Drake were interviewed for Prog magazine, detailing more of Tim's current condition, the sessions behind On the Dry Land's creation and completion and confirming "at least an album's worth" of Sea Nymphs material that is yet to be finished.

Cardiacs will always be here. As for me, I'm still fighting them critters who are trying their best to stop me. But they are losing.

— Tim Smith

A third Alphabet Business Convention was held on 26 August 2017, featuring Cardiacs-related and inspired bands, with Tim Smith in attendance, in the spirit of the preceding conventions.

In September 2017, the Alphabet Business Concern released the long-awaited Some Fairytales from the Rotten Shed DVD which featured Cardiacs rehearsing early songs in preparation for The Special Garage Concerts live shows and surrealist comedy similar to the Maresnest DVD.

In January 2018, almost ten years since Tim Smith's cardiac arrest, an interview and full explanation of his condition were published in multiple major news publications as well as the official Cardiacs website. A donation campaign was simultaneously launched, its goal being to facilitate improved care for Smith with the hope that the proper neurological treatment it would fund would help him regain control of his body, as he had responded positively to similar, but minimal and inconsistent treatment in the past. The initial donation goal of 40,000 GBP was achieved in less than 24 hours, and a new goal of 100,000 GBP was instated, which would fund treatment for one year.

On 25 October 2018, Tim Smith was awarded an honorary music doctorate by the Royal Conservatoire of Scotland. Jim Smith accepted the award on his brother's behalf.

Further fundraising events were held in 2018 and 2019, featuring live music from Cardiacs members and related bands, film screenings and interviews, with Tim Smith sporadically in attendance.

==== 2020–2023: Death of Tim Smith; "Vermin Mangle" ====
Following twelve years of living with dystonia, Smith died on 21 July 2020, with his death announced on Cardiacs website and other news publications the following day by his brother and original band member Jim Smith. A tribute post was made on the official site several days later by Cardiacs' "ordinary shop girl" and website maintainer, Mary. Following his death, Tim Smith received a raft of tributes on social media.

An unreleased Tim Smith Cardiacs song, "Vermin Mangle" (which had been performed by Smith solo in occasional live performances), was shared publicly on 30 July 2020 during Steve Davis' Tim Smith tribute show on Phoenix FM. The song was officially released on 1 September 2020 to mark Smith's funeral which was held the same day. It was released by the band's record label, the Alphabet Business Concern, as a free download through their Bandcamp page at midnight, intended as a thank-you to the group's fans. It was their first single and release of new material since "Ditzy Scene" in 2007, and was intended as the closing track for the then-unreleased LSD. A video recording of 2005's "Secret Bull & Gate Concerts" was broadcast on Cardiacs' YouTube channel December 2020.

==== 2023: Death of Tim Quy; box set reissue of A Little Man and a House and the Whole World Window ====
Former Cardiacs percussionist Tim Quy died on 2 February 2023, aged 61, having been through long and difficult illnesses. Jim announced his passing on the Cardiacs website.

In summer 2023, a 35th anniversary remastered and expanded boxset release of A Little Man and a House and the Whole World Window, overseen by Tim Smith in 2020 as his final task, was released in dedication to Smith and Quy, and quickly sold out.

=== 2024: Sing to Tim tribute shows and the lead-up to LSD ===
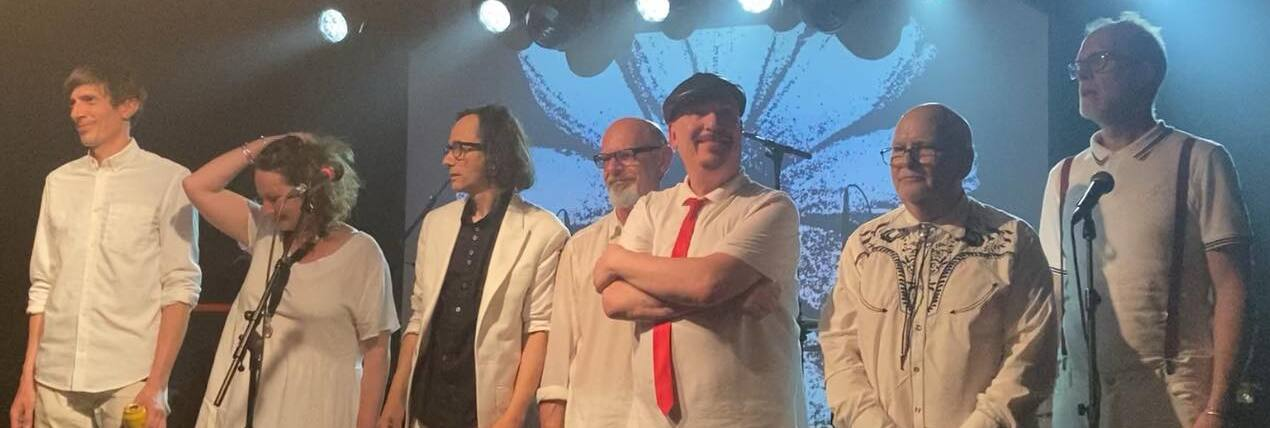
Cardiacs Family & Friends at the Sing to Tim show, 4 May 2024

Over three years after Tim's passing, and having teased at something involving the band in the days preceding, Tim Smith's Spratleys announced a show, featuring Cardiacs members "past, present, and future" to pay tribute to Tim Smith and his music, which was to take place at the Garage on 4 May 2024 (subsequently adding dates 3 May at the Garage and 5 May at Brudenell Social Club). Cardiacs Family & Friends consisted of Jim Smith (bass and backup vocals), Jon Poole (vocals and guitar), Christian Hayes (vocals and guitar), and Bob Leith (drums), with long-time associates Craig Fortnam (percussion), Chlöe Herington (saxophone), and Adrien Rodes (keyboard). Sharron Fortnam (vocals), Jo Spratley (vocals), Tiny Wood from Sleepy People (vocals), and Mark Cawthra (vocals) appeared on stage as guests, as well as Kavus Torabi (guitar, and who was slated to be a main Cardiacs Family & Friends member before schedule conflicts) on 3 May.

Following the May shows in London and Leeds, on 7 May 2024 it was announced that Sing to Tim would be coming back for an autumn tour in early October: the announcement was posted, like the last, on the Tim Smith's Spratleys Facebook page. On 17 June 2024, Cardiacs Family and Friends, along with Tim Smith's Spratleys, played a double-header radio session as part of the BBC Radio 6 Music Riley & Coe block. During their Riley & Coe interviews, Jo Spratley and Jim Smith explained that attempts had been made to resume live activity in 2020 and 2021, but were aborted for various reasons. With the passage of time, all involved believed it was now the right time to continue. Jim Smith also confirmed that the long-unreleased album LSD was in the mixing stage, and that he had hoped to release it around April 2025. He also elaborated that the album had been worked on before and during Tim's illness and after his passing, with contributions from many Cardiacs family members and friends.

The four autumn dates took place between 10 and 13 October at Band on the Wall (Manchester), SWG3 Warehouse (Glasgow), The Grove (Newcastle) and Concorde 2 (Brighton).

=== 2025–present: Release of LSD and singles, new live shows ===
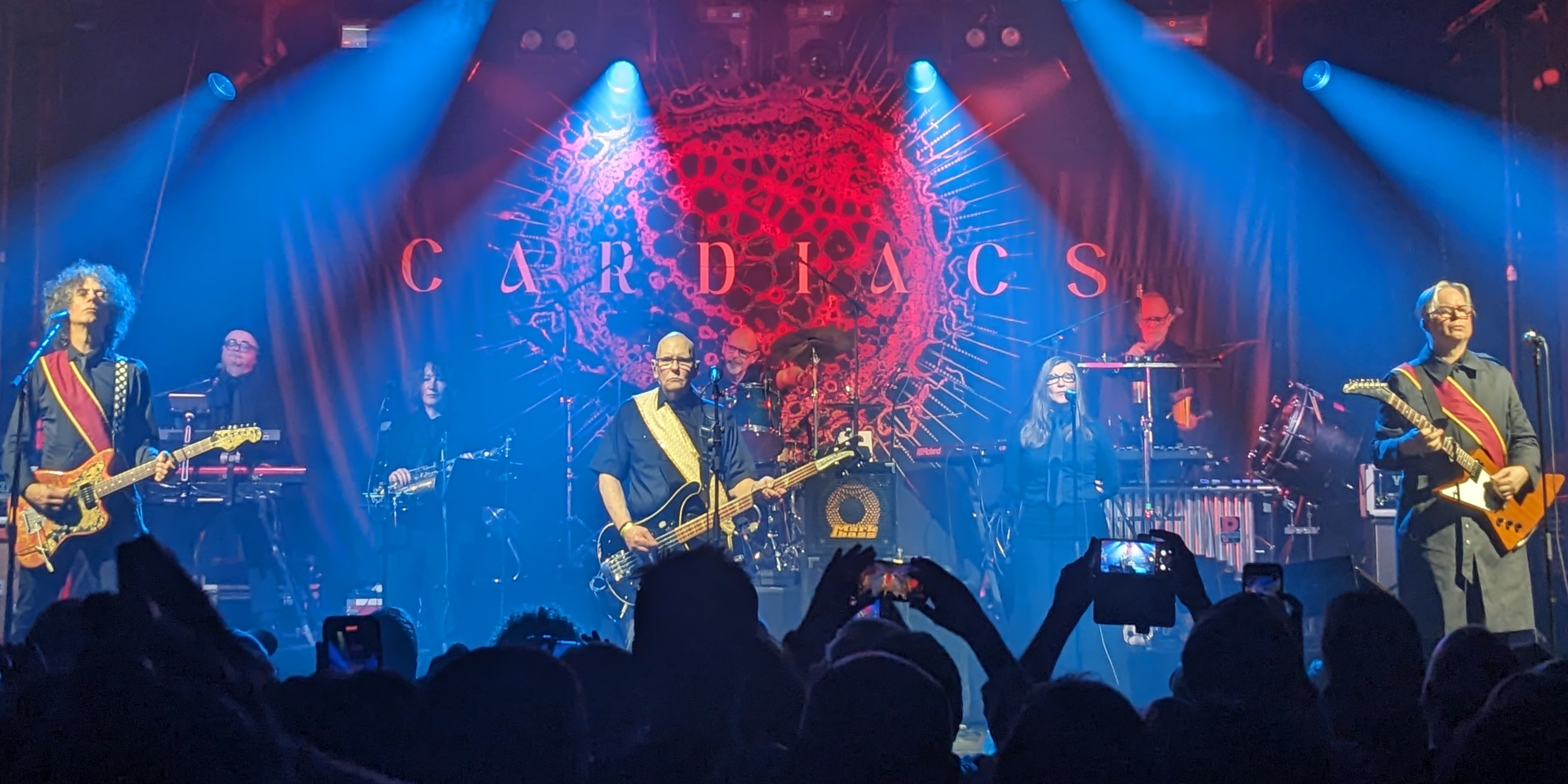
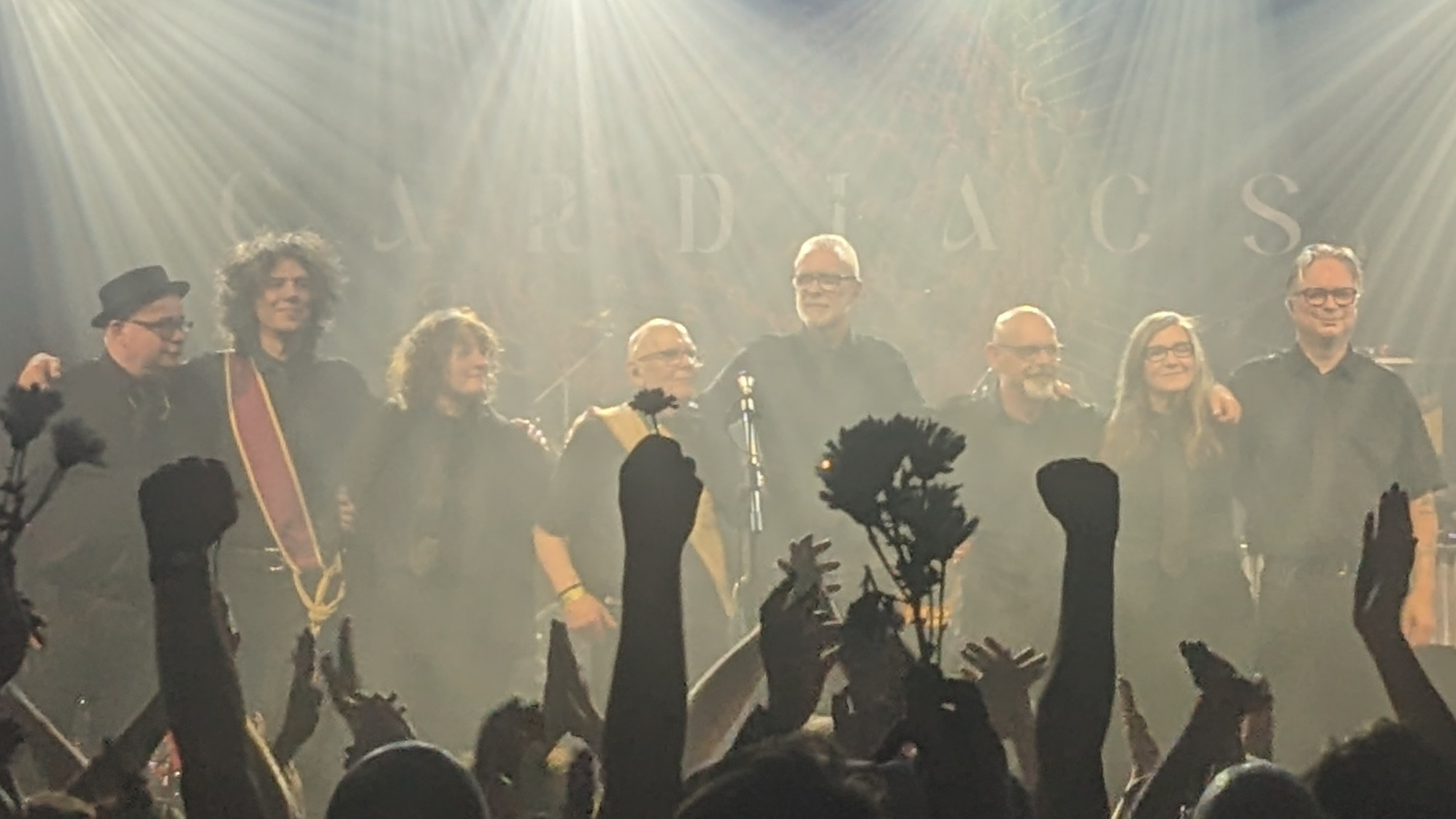
Cardiacs at Electric Brixton in 2026

On 26 July 2025, following a series of teaser images, The Alphabet Business Concern streamed a film of a previously unseen Cardiacs concert taking place at the Town and Country Club, London, 25 March 1988. At the end of the broadcast, a teaser for the first new Cardiacs single in 18 years, "Woodeneye" appeared, to be released 1 August 2025 as the first of three singles for LSD, which itself would be released on 19 September 2025 on physical and digital formats. An early broadcast of the song was played on BBC Radio 6 Music's programme Riley & Coe on 31 July 2025, before debuting on streaming services. Following this, it was confirmed that Mike Vennart had joined Cardiacs and performed as lead on "Woodeneye" and most of LSD, singing where Tim could not, with contributions from Rose-Ellen Kemp. Vennart had been chosen, in part, for the level of "vocal agitation" he could provide to Tim's melodies.

A second LSD single, "Downup", was released on 28 August 2025. At around the same time, the new formal line-up of Cardiacs was confirmed: Jim Smith (bass, vocals), Kavus Torabi (guitars, vocals) and Bob Leith (drums, vocals) being rejoined by Chlöe Herington (saxophone), Craig Fortnam (percussion, glockenspiel) and Sharron Fortnam (vocals) from the Sing to Tim project, plus new members Mike Vennart (lead vocals, guitars) and Jane Kaye (vocals). Rhodri Marsden would later be confirmed as the new keyboard player.

On 14 September 2025, The Alphabet Business Concern debuted LSD ahead of its wide release, with four live synchronized listening parties in various UK venues, each with a different Cardiacs-adjacent musical act as the "opener". A special taped introduction from Jim Smith was played at each, where he thanked fans for their support and firmly declared Cardiacs were to continue as a musical act beyond LSD. Jim was present at the Brighton event, alongside bandmates Torabi and Leith. The third LSD single, "Volob", was released on September 17, 2025.

After the release of LSD, Cardiacs announced three live dates in support of the album for March 2026, at Electric Brixton in London on March 11, Manchester's New Century Hall on March 12 and St. Luke's in Glasgow on March 13. In a September interview, Jim Smith promised that LSD would not be the final Cardiacs release, and that the band likely have "two more albums" which they expect to begin working on in the near future. In February 2026, ArcTanGent Festival announced its final line-up for its 2026 event to take place in August. Cardiacs were an addition to the roster, and the event organiser James Scarlett called the band "highly-requested absolute-legends".

== Musical and lyrical style ==
=== Genre ===
"Think about what pop music is, and where it has been, the things and changes that it has gone through, however ridiculous. All pop is ridiculous and fantastic. Who is to say that you can't do whatever you like with it when you look at its history?"

— Tim Smith, The Yorkshire Post, 2007

Cardiacs have been labeled as art rock, avant-punk, art-pop, experimental music, post-punk, art-punk, progressive rock, experimental rock, indie rock, avant-pop, psych-pop, and psych rock; Jerry Ewing of Prog called Cardiacs a cult alt prog band. Their music is particularly noted for balancing the attack and 'raw energy' of punk rock with the intricacies and technical cleverness of early British progressive rock, and this in turn has led to Cardiacs being referred to as "progressive punk", or the portmanteau "pronk", a musical style which Loudwire writer Jordan Blum said the band "essentially popularized – if not invented", with Cardiacs being labelled the primary exponents. The band have rejected the "prog punk" tag, and Tim Smith, who hated the term "pronk", maintained that Cardiacs were never punk or prog, but had always simply been a "pop" band who played "psychedelia". Torabi called it "pop music that hasn’t been filtered through a reductive process".

The Italian publication OndaRock commented that Cardiacs can also be classified as forerunners of two bizarre "non-genres" that collect projects outside the box, balanced between progressive complexity and pop/punk immediacy: the eighties "Zolo" and the more recent "Fabloo".

=== Style and musical elements ===
"You look at a road on an aerial photograph and you think, bloody hell, it's suburbia, all those little houses, all in a row, but all those houses have people in them – say there's four people in a house, that is four whole worlds... Yes, I mean we're part of it all, we're all in it, but it's strange that you have a house and it's all you ever wanted, you've worked all your life for it and you're keeping it in order for the eyes of others who probably couldn't give a toss anyway – or people who want to compete, to care, which is even weirder."

— Tim Smith discussing suburbia (an early Cardiacs lyrical obsession), Time Out of Mind, c. 1987.

Gil Kaufman of Billboard credited Cardiacs' "wild, whip-saw" style with folding in art rock, jazz, psychedelia, metal, prog and punk into a "roiling musical stew" topped by Smith’s anarchic vocals and hard-to-decipher lyrics. Cardiacs' music also incorporates a broad selection of elements taken from other musical forms such as ska, medieval music, folk music, heavy metal, hymns, classical music and corporate anthems. The Guardian writer Pete Cashmore noted some elements featured being "nursery rhymes, sea shanties, sweet psychedelia, vast hymnal shout-alongs and the occasional, incongruously straightforward rock anthem". The music magazine Organ once commented that "one Cardiacs song contains more ideas than most other musicians' entire careers."

=== Composition ===
Musicians that the band have admitted to as being influences include XTC, Van der Graaf Generator, Pixies, Jethro Tull, Gong, early Split Enz, Devo, Madness, Gentle Giant (though downplayed by Smith), Alberto y Lost Trios Paranoias, early Genesis, Deaf School and Wire. The Who's Quadrophenia was particularly influential on Smith's approach to songwriting, having taught himself how to write musical notation from the album's songbook.

Fans have spotted references to the films The Night of the Hunter and Eraserhead in Smith's words and music videos. Jim Smith recalls the film Overlord as another influence on his brother.

== Performance style and mythology ==
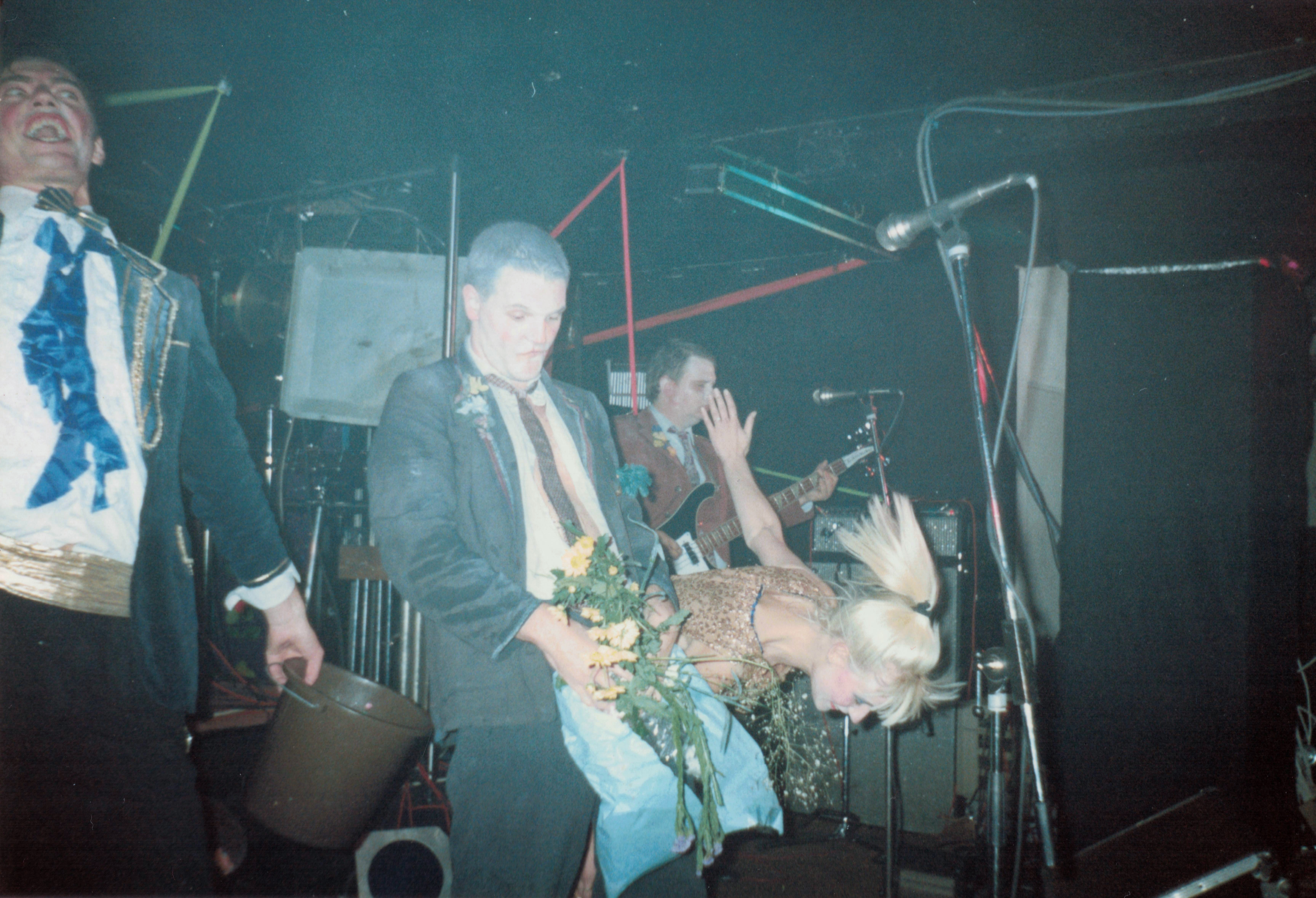
Cardiacs live in Amsterdam, 1987

Alphabet's original representative characters were Cardiac's "sordid, waxy" manager "the Consultant" (real name James Stevens) and his assistant and band advisor "Miss Swift", both of whom made onstage appearances with Cardiacs during the 1980s.

In performance, Cardiacs generally rejected (or occasionally parodied) standard rock band posturing. The band's shows instead featured behaviour which has been described as "therapeutic, surrealist pantomime", compared to absurdist theatre, and labelled "not so much theatrically eccentric as completely fucking neurotic". During any given performance Tim Smith ranted between and during numbers, acting out bizarre childlike ideas and emotions. During the 1980s the band perfected a detailed stage act involving shabby lift attendant costumes, badly-applied clown makeup, Tim Smith's bullying and confrontation of other band members (predominantly Jim Smith), and a final formal presentation of champagne and flowers by the Consultant and Miss Swift complete with confetti, taking place to "a euphoric sweep of saxophone and keyboards that wouldn't seem out of place in a '70s cigar advert." During the 1990s, the theatrical elements of the live show were toned down and the uniforms replaced by formal suits, although certain rituals (including the childlike mannerisms and Smith's ranting style) were retained.

== Legacy ==
While the critical status of Cardiacs is wildly mixed (the band tends to attract extreme responses, with some critics hailing them while others violently condemn them to the point of pariahhood), Cardiacs were renowned for their unique performing and songwriting styles and their poetically cryptic, philosophical and abstract lyrics, as well as for their ability to produce a unique, complex and innovative sound with all their musical ventures over and over again throughout their long career. Tim Smith regularly attracted fulsome praise: he has been described in the music press as the "Mozart", "Beethoven" and "Messiaen" of rock and pop music for his complex and innovative compositional skills, as well as being hailed as a genius (albeit sometimes a "deranged" one). The snooker player Steve Davis is also a big fan of the band and attended many of their live gigs, as well as co-authoring the book Medical Grade Music, featuring Cardiacs, with Torabi.. The actor Mark Benton is a fan.

"I love it when a celeb is on our side. It's not as if their opinions are any more important than anyone else's, I just like it. Who wouldn't? Imagine if a great big celeb lived next door to you and they said they liked your slippers, you'd tell everyone. I would."

— Tim Smith, The Yorkshire Post, 2007

Cardiacs have had a profound underground influence on over three decades of musicians, including the pioneers of the nu metal and avant-garde metal genres. The band has also influenced math rock artists such as the Monsoon Bassoon and Battles. Groups who have cited Tim Smith's work as a major influence include Blur, Mike Vennart and his band Oceansize, Mike Patton of Faith No More and Mr. Bungle, and Tool. During the 1980s, Cardiacs were a professed influence or inspiration for Marillion, It Bites and British psychedelic acts such as Ring; during the 1990s, emerging bands and musicians who were or became Cardiacs fans included Blur, Supergrass, Shane Embury of Napalm Death, Storm Corrosion's Steven Wilson and Mikael Åkerfeldt, Neil Cicierega, the Scaramanga Six, the Monsoon Bassoon, Leech Woman, Mike Keneally, Justin Hawkins of The Darkness, Dave Grohl of Foo Fighters, and the Wildhearts (who would later pay direct tribute via their track "Tim Smith" on 2009's Chutzpah! and 2021's "We Sing for Tim"). During the 2000s, Cardiacs influenced musical acts such as Rocketgoldstar, Little Trophy, the Display Team, Liberty Ships, Major Parkinson and Silvery. During the 2010s, Cardiacs-inspired musical acts like Black Midi, The Fierce and the Dead, Everything Everything, and Bent Knee entered the scene. Visual artists Cyriak and Jim Woodring have also professed an affinity for Cardiacs and Tim Smith.

Six months after Tim Smith's death, Cardiacs' discography was added to streaming services on 22 January 2021, with the only digital access previously having been provided by the band's Bandcamp page.

In January 2025, the band released a visual history coffee table book, Cardiacs: A Big Book and a Band and the Whole World Window, with author Aaron Tanner.

== Members ==
Current lineup

- Jim Smith – bass, vocals (1977–present)
- Bob Leith – drums, vocals (1993–present)
- Kavus Torabi – guitar, vocals (2003–present)
- Sharron Fortnam – vocals (2004–2007, 2025 or earlier–present)
- Craig Fortnam – percussion, keyboards, vocals, acoustic guitar (2025 or earlier–present)
- Chloe Herington – saxophone, vocals (2025 or earlier–present)
- Mike Vennart – lead vocals, guitar (2025 or earlier–present)
- Rhodri Marsden – keyboards, vocals (2025–present)

Former members

- Tim Smith – vocals, guitar, keyboards (1977–2008; died 2020)
- Michael Pugh – vocals (1977–1980)
- Peter Tagg – drums (1977–1979)
- Colvin Mayers – keyboards (1978–1981; died 1993)
- Ralph Cade – saxophone (1978–1979)
- Mark Cawthra – drums (1979–1982), keyboards (1982–1983), vocals (1979–1983)
- Sarah Smith – saxophone, clarinet, vocals, keyboards (1980–1989; later guest appearances)
- Tim Quy – percussion, keyboards (1981–1990; died 2023)
- Dominic Luckman – drums (1982–1993)
- William D. Drake – keyboards, vocals (1983–1990)
- Graham Simmonds – guitar (1983–1984)
- Marguerite Johnston – saxophone (1983–1984)
- Christian Hayes – guitar, vocals (1989–1991)
- Jon Poole – guitar, keyboards, vocals (1991–2003)
- Cathy Harabaras – percussion (2004–2008)
- Claire Lemmon – vocals (2004–2007)
- Dawn Staple – percussion (2004–2007)
- Melanie Woods – vocals (2004–2008)
- Adrien Rodes - keyboards (2024)
- Jane Kaye – vocals (2025 or earlier–2026)

== Discography ==
- A Little Man and a House and the Whole World Window (1988)
- On Land and in the Sea (1989)
- Heaven Born and Ever Bright (1992)
- Sing to God (1996)
- Guns (1999)
- LSD (2025)
