= Sing to God =

Studio album by Cardiacs
- Released: 10 June 1996
- Recorded: Spring–Winter 1995
- Studios: Apollo 8; Sally Birthday House
- Genres: Progressive rock; progressive metal; art punk; avant-garde; noise rock; progressive punk
- Length: 88:48
- Label: Alphabet Business Concern
- Producer: Tim Smith

Cardiacs chronology
Sampler (1995)	Sing to God (1996)	Guns (1999)

Singles from Sing to God
- 1. "Bellyeye" Released: 17 April 1995; 2. "Manhoo" Released: 1995; 3. "Odd Even" Released: 1995

Sing to God is the fourth studio album by the English rock band Cardiacs. (Note: A Little Man and a House and the Whole World Window (1988) is officially considered to be the band's first proper studio album. Sing to God is Cardiacs' seventh album if their cassette only releases The Obvious Identity (1980), Toy World (1981) and The Seaside (1984) are taken into account.) Their first album with drummer Bob Leith, it was recorded throughout 1995, breaking a hiatus by the band that had lasted since the band's previous album Heaven Born and Ever Bright (1992). During writing and recording, Jon Poole took a greater role than before, contributing to many songs written by band leader Tim Smith, and writing some of his own. The band decided to create a double album to encompass the great wealth of material written after their previous album. As with the band's previous albums, it presents a unique sound, and is seen as more eclectic than the band's previous albums.

The album was released in June 1996 by the band's own record label Alphabet Business Concern, originally as a limited edition double-disc CD set, before being re-released as two separate albums. Three singles were released from the album; "Bellyeye", "Manhoo" and "Odd Even". Upon release the album was mostly overlooked, with the exception of some hostile reviews, reflecting the band's unpopularity with the music press at the time. However, over time it has gained a reputation as a masterpiece and the band's magnum opus. Sam Shepherd of MusicOMH said the album is "quite possibly one of the greatest albums ever made." The album was re-released in 2014 as a double LP set, the first time it had been released on vinyl.

== Background ==
After Cardiacs released their fifth album On Land and in the Sea (1989), the group's line up drastically changed; percussionist Tim Quy, keyboardist William D. Drake, saxophonist Sarah Smith and guitarist Bic Hayes all left the band. For the band's subsequent album Heaven Born and Ever Bright (1992), the band became a four-piece, with Jon Poole replacing Bic Hayes' place on guitar during the sessions, and the results gave the album a more direct, heavier direction than the band's previous albums. The album was initially released on Rough Trade instead of the band's own label Alphabet Business Concern, who usually release the band's albums. However, as soon as the album was released, Rough Trade "went under" and closed, ceasing to exist, which put the band "in a bit of a financial trap".

Following its release, their drummer Dominic Luckman left the band and was replaced by Bob "Babba" Leith, and the band subsequently became their second "classic" line-up, sometimes referred to as "Cardiacs Mark II". During this period, the members of the band "all got up to other things." Band leader Tim Smith "produced some other bands albums and things like that." In doing this, the band got the money to re-release their own, older material and carry on, "so it was kind of a blessing in disguise in a funny kind of way." As a four-piece, their next album would utilise the studio to flesh out the band's sound. Due to the sheer amount of material that group leader Tim Smith had written over a number of years with little or no Cardiacs live performances, they decided that their new album would be a double album.

== Recording ==
The band recorded the album between Spring and Winter 1995 at the London studio Apollo 8, and at Sally Birthday House Studios (a studio of an unknown location described as simply being "somewhere"). Jon Poole recalled that "Jim and Jane's" house was a location for recording." Although the band have a status as a cult band, during recording, the band opened for Blur at Mile End Stadium and recorded a Radio 1 live session with Mark Radcliffe, which aired 24 April 1995, and a Lunchtime Acoustic Session broadcast live on GLR Radio on 16 May 1995.

I remember Tim had programmed the weird bit in the middle of "Odd Even" and left me to find a guitar line amongst the chords so I was sat on my own dropping myself in. When he came back it was done and he was very happy... particularly with my choice of last note! We would both make suggestions then Tim would edit the ideas into something that worked. Tim would chip in with ideas for my songs too like the string arrangement on "Manhoo" which was lovely.

— Jon Poole recalling some of the album's production.

The album sessions presented a change in Cardiacs' working methods. Whereas most previous material had been written and arranged by band leader Tim Smith, Sing to God features extensive contributions from Jon Poole, who played a strong role in orchestrating Smith's basic material with detailed riffs and keyboard parts and contributed several songs entirely written by himself, whilst drummer Bob Leith also made significant contributions to the album's lyrics. In a 1996 interview, Smith said "I really like the stuff [Poole]'s written, we all do. We're really dead lucky to have someone like him. He's written some great stuff for the new album." Poole recalled that "this was a joyous and creative time and easily the best time I had in the band which is strange as I was going through upheaval in my personal life and had to keep walking off into the fields to have a good old blub but maybe this added to it all! We took the studio to Jim and Jane's place in the country. When I arrived there Jim and Jane were adding snipping sounds with garden tools to 'Wireless'. To this day I think it's one of Jane's proudest moments and I love hearing her tell other people about how surreal it was."

During recording there, Tim Smith would create drums and rough keyboard chords on tape and would ask Poole to come up with guitar and bass riffs. Poole recalled "I was literally allowed to do pretty much anything I wanted." Tim would then "do the production bit" and "get the best out of" Poole. The two sometimes contributed to the writing of each other's tracks, including Smith contributing the string arrangement to Poole's "Manhoo". During this phase of recording, Jim and Jane invited all the band's friends over "every so often for parties that have now gone down in history as being nothing short of legendary." In 2009, Poole recalled that "I still can't listen to Mr Bungle or Mercury Rev without having disturbing flashbacks! It was a wonderful time and something that I'm so lucky to have been a part of. Tim would no doubt echo that."

Although Leith joined the band for the album, Poole confirmed that the drums on the album were programmed by Smith and Poole with assistance from Leith. Additionally, Poole stated that Jim had almost no involvement in the bass recording, participating in only four songs, which he has not specified to this day. He added that the majority of the album was recorded by Poole and Smith, but also affirmed that all members were heavily involved in recording backing vocals.

== Music ==
Sing to God presents a unique sound that critics found hard to classify, and is seen as "a record that is scarcely comparable to anything else by anyone else." A journalist from PIEmag said the album was "more original and dynamic than ever before; they mix their classic Cardiacesque, huge orchestral harmonies with delicate pop, fast rocking and furious, at times almost Naked City-ish jazz structures. To add yet another dimension to their music, they experiment with sound and production in a way we haven't heard since the heyday of Psychic TV, or even the old 'kraut' bands like Faust, Neu!, Can etc.." Benjamin Bland of Drowned in Sound said that "somewhat approximate to the notion of Cardiacs squared, Sing to God essentially takes everything Cardiacs had always been and ramps it up to maximum." He noted that "this is a record drenched in deranged pomposity, from the massive riffs to the expansive keyboards and theatrical vocals. That's without even mentioning the bits that sound something like Sgt Pepper being performed by a Frank Zappa conducted London Symphony Orchestra on speed." Sean Kitching of The Quietus said the album is "the pinnacle of Tim Smith's studio mastery and exhibits elements of the gentler side of his Sea Nymphs project alongside the full-on helter skelter, breakneck velocity more usually associated with the band. It is also, despite the richness of its orchestration and more experimental tendencies, decidedly a pop record–one as quintessentially English sounding as Pink Floyd's seminal Piper at the Gates of Dawn or XTC's classic English Settlement." He also commented that the album marked the point where "Smith's ability to express the music inside his head really began to transcend any sort of identifiable genre and turned Cardiacs into something truly unique."

The album also features material originally written for various other Cardiacs related projects. The track "Nurses Whispering Verses" had been recorded twice before, once on the band's 1981 cassette album Toy World and once on the original cassette release of the band's 1984 album The Seaside (it was removed from the 1995 CD reissue, but reinstated on the 2015 CD and Vinyl reissue in remastered form). "Bell Stinks", "Bell Clinks" and "Angleworm Angel", all written by Poole, were all taken from the repertoire of the thrash band Panixsphere, which featured Smith and Poole alongside Bic Hayes and David Francolini of Levitation. "Billion" is allegedly the first song which Tim Smith ever wrote, resurrected and recorded many years after its composition, whilst "Wireless" features Tim Smith reading from a children's story called "Peril on the Sea" written by Dawn Staple, who would join the band in 2004 as a percussionist and backing singer. Sam Shepherd opined that "if you were to take a guess at what Smith was suggesting with this album it would simply be that the world is a magical, wondrous place, and that it is still possible to see it through a child's eyes. To that end, any religious themes that can be detected are swamped in childlike word play or muted understanding. Creation is covered in the beautifully grotesque "Insect Hooves on Lassie", which finds Tim indulging in a little re-designing and making his own kind of hero dog."

=== Songs ===
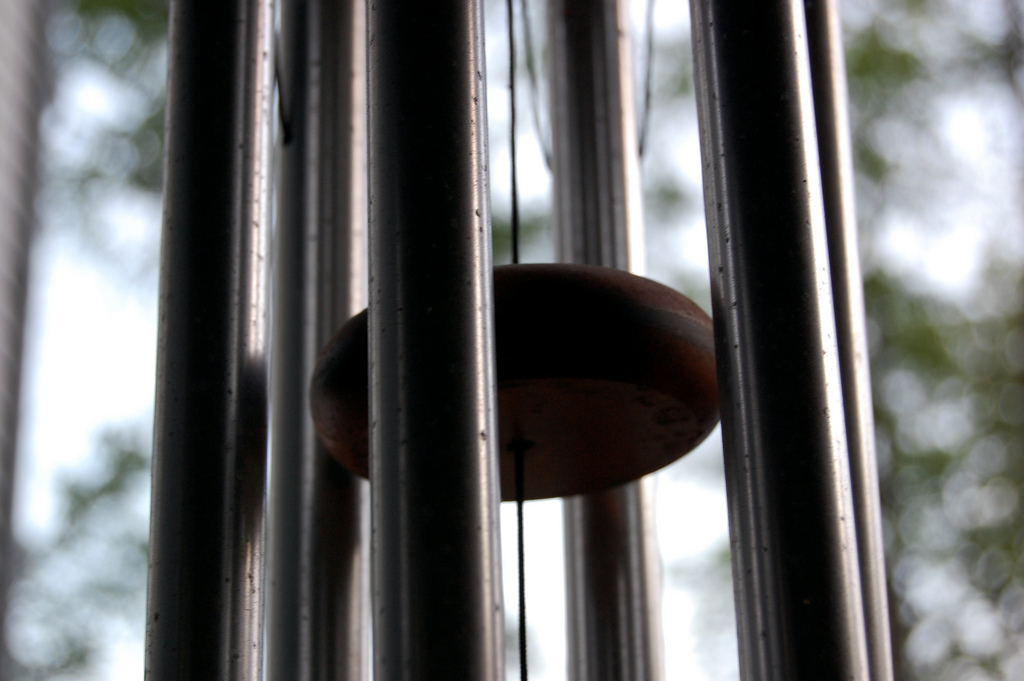
The sound of a Happy Apple, a Fisher-Price toy, begins the album, like "the twinkling of the stars that grace the cover of the album."

Kitching, describing the opening track "Eden on the Air", said "a sound like a wind chime being struck followed by some seconds silence proceeds from the initial drop of the needle as 'Eden on the Air' swells, imperceptibly at first, to coalesce like early morning mist, beautiful but only briefly there." Sam Shepherd of MusicOMH said that the "gently tinkling wind chime and then short passage" sound like "the twinkling of the stars that grace the cover of the album." "Eat It Up Worms Hero" has been described as coming "something of a shock, shaking the listener rudely out of their reverie" and as "easily the album's most abrasive and chaotic sounding track." It is a product of Smith using the studio as instrument, conducting a mass of choral voices against buzzsaw guitars and manic electronic pulses. The "singalong craziness" of "Dog Like Sparky" combines "a tale of everyday pet disablement to a wonky oompah knees up". Kitching called it a "stupidly, almost overwhelmingly happy song with a playful blasphemy hidden in its heart ("Put your hands on the Holy Bible and scream wank") and an utterly demented keyboard refrain that sounds like a fleet of ice-cream vans chiming simultaneously." Shepherd noted that "three songs in, and already there's been enough ideas thrown into the mix to fill most bands entire careers." "Fiery Gun Hand" keeps the pace of the album up and then "floors the accelerator. In anybody else's hands it's a song that could be described as metal or punk, but there are so many flourishes, so many deviations and any number of ridiculous fuck yous to convention that it can't be labelled. Which is of course exactly how it should be." Kitching called it "an electrifying piece of avant-pop orchestration with Jon Poole's guitar solo (spliced together by Smith from several Poole solos) redefining the term 'incendiary'."

A curious mix of classical, rock and hymn, this is Cardiacs giving praise to…well, something, or someone, it's never entirely clear. Smith's songwriting here is impeccable. Almost imperceptible shifts in chord patterns push the song towards rapture as it progresses, so that as it reaches the half way point there's already a sense of epiphany. Yet somehow, it continues to build and grow, striving for something more and finding it. "Dirty Boy" is not just singing to god; it feels like finding god.

— Sam Shepherd of MusicOMH describing "Dirty Boy".

"Bellyeye" and "Manhoo" have both been compared to Blur, a band influenced by Cardiacs. The latter, written by Poole, "has a skip in its step and a rumbling and forceful bassline that somehow couldn't be poppier if it was covered in glitter," and features a string arrangement written by Tim Smith. "Wireless" was described as one of the "most beautiful" tracks on the album, is Smith's re-imagining of Faust's song "Psalter", also known as "Lauft... Heisst Das es Lauft Oder es Kommt Bald... Lauft", but performed primarily on piano and scissor-wielding percussive ensemble that ends with Smith reading a "bizarre aquatic-themed children's story." Jim and Jane Smith added snipping sounds with garden tools to the song. "Dirty Boy", which opens the second disc, is "perhaps the album's crowning achievement" according to Kitching, beginning with a guitar riff and alchemically transmuting that song over the course of its nearly nine minutes duration with "celestially ringing sounds" constructed by "innumerably overlaid strata of acoustic guitar and incredibly drawn out sustained vocals that when performed live had an undeniably consciousness-altering effect on all those present." "Quiet as a Mouse", described as a "weird piece", was described by Tim Smith as the sound of "just somebody who left the tape running when we were doing these orchestral bits." The band came across it "kind of accidentally" and enjoyed it enough to include it on the album.

"Red Fire Coming out from His Gills" returns to the "aquatic fairy tale theme" of the end of "Wireless" and "turns it into a classically infused anthem that wouldn't be out of place as the soundtrack to a really strange animated children's TV show." "Foundling" was described as having "subdued beauty," and alongside "No Gold", return the album "once more to gentler Sea Nymphs territory, whilst "Nurses Whispering Verses", which takes its title from the Slapp Happy and Henry Cow song "In the Sickbay" from their album Desperate Straights (1975), is a "definitive" re-recording of one of the band's earliest songs, having originally been recorded and released twice for the band's first two albums, Toy World (1981) and The Seaside (1984), when it had become a firm favourite in the band's live performances at the time.

== Title and cover art ==
Tim Smith denied that the album title, Sing to God, was a reference to faith. He said that the album was named it "merely because [former Cardiacs keyboardist] Bill Drake had this little kid-hymn book and it was called Sing to God and we thought it was a nice title." He said that "it's just if the word "Jesus" appears [in the album's lyrics], it's just because it mentions Jesus in the same way that anyone's name would appear." The album cover, featuring the band's disembodied heads floating against a dark night sky dotted with stars, was inspired by the opening scene of the 1955 film The Night of the Hunter. Sean Kitching of The Quietus said that "the creepy fairytale atmosphere" of the film "makes it an entirely appropriate image that resonates perfectly with the album's overall vibe. The fact that the band members' eyes are all rendered artificially larger, suggesting wide-eyed children, or perhaps adults returned to that beatific state by the administration of some pharmaceutical philtre, also attests to the truly psychedelic nature of the sounds contained within."

== Promotion and release ==
The album was released on 10 June 1996 by the band's own label Alphabet Business Concern. Originally a limited edition run of 3000 double album CD sets, Sing to God was subsequently re-released as two separate albums, Sing to God – Part One and Sing to God – Part Two. The band's website explained this, saying the album "was later split into two separate albums due to a mistake". "Bellyeye" was released as the album's first single several months ahead of the album on Org Records, the record-releasing wing of long-term Cardiacs' supporters Organ Magazine. It was one of the band's few releases on a label other than Alphabet Business Concern. Tim Smith said the single was "only a small release made by some friends who run a fanzine over here. Since we hadn't released anything for a couple of years they offered to put that out for us. That was a part of the new album that we were recording at the time anyway." A comment about not disturbing commercial sensibilities was slightly edited in the "Manhoo" single because "it was too long and when it's too long it won't be played on the radio." The part in question was "that middle bit where it goes off the wall a little bit, it comes off the rail and then lands back where it was in the first place. [The band] thought [they'd] just keep it on the rail. [Tim Smith] likes both versions." Two further singles were released from the album, "Manhoo" and "Odd Even", both released like the album on the band's own Alphabet Business Concern label. Additional singles for “Bell Clinks” and “Dirty Boy” were planned but never released. None of the singles charted.

=== Reception ===
Professional ratings
Review scores
Source	Rating
Encyclopedia of Popular Music	3/5 stars
Organ	(very favourable)
Progsphere	(very favourable)
Uncut	9/10
Vox	0/10

AllMusic biographer Paul Simpson noted that Sing to God appeared to barely any press. One of the only original reviews was a review in Vox, who rated the album a score of 0/10. When asked by upon release by PIEmag how the album had been received by fans and the media, Tim Smith noted the band's lack of media reception and how it was "really not allowed to play anything that might go against the grain of the current fashion". He said that the band were a prime target for the British media's dartboard due to "the fact that we're not good looking, the fact that we're probably getting on a bit now, that kind of thing", and called Radio 1 DJ Mark Radcliffe "the only person in the media that sticks his neck out for us".

Over time, music critics have re-evaluated Cardiacs and their albums, and today Sing to God is considered a masterpiece, and is often retroactively regarded as the band's magnum opus or masterwork. Original copies for the album command high prices in second hand retail. A reviewer for PIEmag said the album was considered by "many (myself included)" to be "one of the finest moments in Cardiac history. Andrew "Tiny" Wood, singer of the band Ultrasound, reviewed the album as an "Under Rated Album" for Crackle Feedback as part of an article about his record collection. Wood said that Sing To God was released "right in the middle of the so called Britpop thing, and if anyone can lay claim to the Britpop crown it is the Cardiacs, largely ignored in a period which was desperately in need of a nostalgia for something that never really happened in the first place, instead of a celebration of what we Brits can achieve when we really put our minds and imaginations to it. The Cardiacs were probably the greatest band ever to come out of Britain, and one day they will be recognised." He commented that "It sprawls over two discs like a many-tendrilled beast, taking in influences from Krautrock to the Kinks in a lysergic soup like a scorpion sting to the head, sharp yet soporific, making me dizzy with intense spins and swirls of sound and colour." In an interview with Prog, Devin Townsend said Sing to God is the prog album he plays to "get [him] in a good mood": "It's uplifting and intense. Some of the chord changes are so unconventional and hilarious." In a 2015 list for Team Rock, musician Mike Vennart included "Eat it Up Worms Hero", "Dog Like Sparky" and "Dirty Boy" in his list of "The 10 Best Cardiacs Songs".

In a 2025 buyer's guide to Cardiacs for an article covering the album LSD, the magazine Uncut said Sing to God is "shot through with anxious energy, a bristling, unsettled psychedelia", calling it "perhaps Cardiacs' creative pinnacle", and described "Dirty Boy" as "overwhelming", "emotionally taut" and "one of their most enduring songs".

=== 2014 reissue ===
Professional ratings
Reviews for 2014 reissue
Review scores
Source	Rating
Drowned in Sound	9/10
The Line of Best Fit	8.5/10
MusicOMH	(very favourable)
Pennyblackmusic	(very favourable)
The Quietus	(very favourable)

The album was re-released as a 2xLP set on 14 July 2014, the first time it was released on vinyl. This re-release was a 180g "heavyweight" vinyl set, described by The Quietus as being "always deserved" and "beautiful". The set features previously unseen band photographs inside the sleeve and the individual band members' faces from the album cover now adorning a side each of the centre labels. Sam Shepherd of MusicOMH called it "the latest in a series of re-issues of albums that have long been unavailable, except to those with exceedingly deep pockets on eBay." Uncut listed the reissue at number 20 on their "Reissues of the Year" list.

Benjamin Bland of Drowned in Sound said that "to say it's highly regarded amongst Cardiacs fans everywhere would be the understatement of the century." Sam Shepherd of MusicOMH was very favourable, called the album "the band's crowning glory" and "quite possibly one of the greatest albums ever made." He said "it would be possible to write about Sing to God and the sheer brilliance of Cardiacs for ever, but the truth is, words will never be able to describe just how incredible the band and this album is. The only way to find out is to hear it, and once you do, things will never be quite the same again. This really is an album worthy of laudation." He also noted that "It is an incorrect received wisdom that double-albums are fundamentally flawed. Prior to Sing to God, it's an argument that may have held some water, but over the course of two discs (or four sides of vinyl) there is not an ounce of fat or mindless folly. This is an album of unmitigated genius from start to finish."

Sean Kitching of The Quietus said "this is a wonderful album for those whose hearts lack the cynicism to ridicule its often delirious flights of fancy, a cornucopia of synaesthetically rendered technicolor delights for those who have not yet lost the innocence required to be receptive its psychedelic splendour." Michael Rodham-Heaps of Freq.org.uk called it "an absolute joy from start to finish". Alex Wisgard of The Line of Best Fit gave the album a score of 8.5/10, saying "no one was writing music like this in the Nineties – okay, Mansun came close with Six, but they never made a career out of songs like that, did they? And you can't imagine Cardiacs ever having an "I Can Only Disappoint U" moment - and I doubt anyone has really ever tried since. With Tim Smith still recovering from a life-threatening heart-attack-and-stroke combination which befell him in 2008, sadly the man himself is in no position either. But with their work slowly coming back into circulation, now is as good a time as any to try and unravel their mystery before anyone else catches up."

== Legacy ==
When asked in a 2001 interview with Margen Magazine, whether he thinks Sing to God is the band's best album due to it being their "more known album", Tim Smith replied "no… I sort of like them all in one way or another." The band followed Sing to God with Guns (1999), which shocked fans due to its less restless sound.

Singin' to God, released in 2018 under the name of the 180 Gs, reinterprets the songs of Sing to God in a barbershop, or a cappella, style. The Detroit group which created the idea previously adapted Negativland's songbook and covered the Residents' Commercial Album the following year. In the magazine Art Rockin', Lee Henderson praised Singin' to God for being "full of abundant lushness, ripe with energy, tenacious arrangements, with nearly unreal accomplishment." Matt Keeley of Kittysneezes said that the album was "mostly for those who are already fans of Cardiacs" and called the a cappella arrangements of the band's complex melodies "jawdropping", with the album being "a masterpiece in its own right" alongside the original.

== Track listing ==
String Quartet arrangements by Tim Smith. Riffs and arrangements throughout by Jon Poole and Tim Smith. All lyrics and music by Tim Smith except where noted.

Disc one
No.	Title	Lyrics	Music	Length
1.	"Eden on the Air"			2:21
2.	"Eat It Up Worms Hero"	Smith; Bob Leith		2:33
3.	"Dog-Like Sparky"			4:53
4.	"Fiery Gun Hand"			5:13
5.	"Insect Hoofs on Lassie"			3:00
6.	"Fairy Mary Mag"			3:44
7.	"Bellyeye"			4:09
8.	"A Horse’s Tail"	Jon Poole	Poole	3:47
9.	"Manhoo"	Smith; Poole	Poole	4:59
10.	"Wireless"			8:22
Total length:				43:01

Disc two
No.	Title	Lyrics	Music	Length
1.	"Dirty Boy"	Smith; Leith		8:54
2.	"Billion"			0:41
3.	"Odd Even"			3:18
4.	"Bell Stinks"	–	Poole	1:19
5.	"Bell Clinks"	Poole	Poole	2:54
6.	"Flap Off You Beak"			3:44
7.	"Quiet as a Mouse"	–	–	1:28
8.	"Angleworm Angel"	Poole	Poole	2:24
9.	"Red Fire Coming Out from His Gills"			2:14
10.	"No Gold"			3:31
11.	"Nurses Whispering Verses"	Smith; Leith		9:53
12.	"Foundling"			5:27
Total length:				45:47

Notes

- "Wireless" contains the story "Peril on the Sea" by Dawn Staple.
- A hidden track of a seconds-long, quiet bell jingle (often referred to as the 'ABC/Alphabet Business Concern/Cardiacs chimes/theme') closes the album after a short silence, as with most Cardiacs albums.

== Personnel ==
Credits adapted from the liner notes of Sing to God.

- Bob Leith – drums (though credited, did not play on the album), vocals
- Jim Smith – bass, vocals
- Tim Smith – guitar, keyboards, vocals
- Jon Poole – guitar, keyboards, vocals

With Extra Special Guest stars:

- Sarah Smith – vocals, saxophones
- Claire Lemmon – vocals
- Natalie Box – violins
- Jane Kypriandis – scissors
- Mark Barratt – trumpets
- Chris Brierly, Catherine Morgan, Mark Pharaoh, Robert Woodard – string quartet

Additional personnel

- Cardiacs – television organ (Note: "Trivia - the 'television organ' is an organ that WD Drake (a former member of Cardiacs) accidentally built out of an old television.")
- David Murder – orchestral arrangements on "Fiery Gun Hand" and at the end of "Wireless", orchestrations, orchestra
- Dawn Staple – "Peril on the Sea" story
- Tim Smith – production
- Jim Smith – engineering (uncredited)

Artwork

- Matt Anker – photography
- Phil at Murray Weaver – manipulation
