= Kooba Radio =

- Type: Podcast and online streaming radio
- Country: United Kingdom
- Availability: International
- Founded: Jon Chappell, Alex Malloy, She Who
- Launch date: 21 December 2002
- Official website: http://www.koobaradio.co.uk/

Kooba Radio was an independent, non-profit, Internet-based radio station focused on alternative rock, playing unsigned bands and artists with independent record labels. Kooba is PRS (Performing Right Society) registered and played to a listenership in over 20 countries.

Created 21 December 2002, Kooba Radio began was principally based in South East London. Starting initially with founders Jon Chappell (Jonny Yeah), Alex Malloy (The Boy Malloy) and She Who Must Not Be Named, the main ethos behind the station was "if you've signed, you've sold out" with a strong impetus towards the promotion of promising bands hitherto ignored by major record labels. This slogan was abandoned when it became prevalent that bands would release their music on their own labels.

The flagship show of the station is the Jonny and Alex Show, originally featuring the principal founders (Jon and Alex) with the added participation of both occasional and regular guests appearing on a random basis. The content of the show, which often takes on the feel of the zoo format features occasional comedy sketches, irreverent chat, interviews and guest performances from musicians.

One of the many local scenes from South East London which Kooba helped promote was the Basement Rock movement.

The station started out with a once a week show which streamed on-demand over the Internet using SHOUTcast via a link on the website. It has since greatly expanded its listening audience following the advent of the popular podcast broadcast platform, going on to be noted in Time Out London's Podcast of the Week in 2006.

The style of music played on the shows is varied and includes alt rock, electro, post rock, punk, post punk, classic rock, metal, folk, pronk, hip hop, rock and roll, comedy, blues, experimental and a myriad of other styles.

== Christathon ==
By far Kooba's most successful creation is Christathon – Kooba Radio’s annual crucifixion themed pub crawl.

Christathon went viral in 2011 leading to media attention from timeout and AllInLondon.

Although Kooba Radio closed in 2012 another Christathon is planned for Easter Sunday 2014, this time organised by people unaffiliated to Kooba Radio.

== Station Closure ==
Kooba Radio ceased recording new shows at the end of 2012, marking the end of a decade broadcasting unsigned bands and new music. The last show-proper was the run down of the 2012 Band of the Year Competition. This will be followed by Christathon 2013 and a 1-off live special later in 2013.
