= Stuffy/The Fuses =

- Origin: London, England
- Genres: Alternative rock; indie rock
- Years active: 2003–2009; 2023–present
- Labels: Wrath; Sour Puss; This Is Fake DIY; MayGoZero; [Advanced] Cat Skills; Hungry Audio
- Members: Stuffy; Jen Fuse; Jon Fuse; Athen Fuse
- Past members: Steve Fuse; Doc Fuse; Chopper Fuse; Lucy Fuse
- Website: stuffyandthefuses.co.uk

Stuffy/The Fuses are a band from South London formed in 2003.

== Biography ==
The band was formed by Stephen Gilchrist (aka stuffy, also the drummer in Graham Coxon's band) who recorded the band's debut album Join Me Or Die before actually getting a complete line up together. The core line up consisting of Jon Fuse (aka Jon Clayton), Jen Fuse (aka Jen Macro), and stuffy formed in early 2003. They released the double A-sided single "Evel Knievel"/"In The River" on Magoo's May Go Zero label. Shortly after they signed to Wrath Records and were the token Londoners on the Leeds-based label.

The next couple of years were spent sporadically touring and supporting such bands as Duels, Battle, ¡Forward, Russia! and Brakes. They were also one of the last bands to record a Peel Session which included a cover of "Top Tim Rubies" by Deerhoof; the session was broadcast on Huw Stephens' show after Peel's death.

In 2005 they recorded the follow-up album Angels Are Ace which was recorded by Steve Albini. The full release of the album followed in 2007 on London based record label Sour Puss.

The band played mainly as a 3-piece for 2007/2008 and played their last show (including Lucy Fuse) on 23 January 2009 at The Windmill in Brixton, South London.

== Musical style ==
The band were described by Artrocker as "XTC pop at Fugazi volume". A review of "Metal Queen Theme" described the track as sounding "like Pixies duelling with Kenickie", while "Sir Wants Sex" drew comparisons with Brian Wilson and The Breeders. A musicOMH review of Angels are Ace described them as sounding "like the archetypical UK indie band". "Where's the Captain" was described by Gigwise.com as "a 3 minute angst ridden blast of paranoia, edginess and scrawling guitars that leaves you exhausted after just one listen", with Stuffy's vocals compared to Frank Black.

== Band members ==
- Stuffy (Stephen Gilchrist) - vocals, drums
- Jon Fuse (Jon Clayton) - vocals, guitar
- Jen Fuse (Jen Macro) - bass guitar, vocals

The band has included several keyboard players during its lifetime

- Steve Fuse (Steve White) - Join Me Or Die sessions
- Doc Fuse (Dr. John Gulliver) - Touring 2003 - 2004
- Chopper Fuses (Ian Cotterill) - Touring 2004 - 2006 & Angels Are Ace recording sessions
- Lucy Fuse (Lucy Parnell) - Touring 2006 - 2007

== Discography ==
=== Albums ===
- Join Me Or Die (Wrath Records, March 2004, CD/DD)
- Angels Are Ace (Sour Puss, July 2007, CD/LP/DD)

=== Mini-albums ===
- Little Angels Are Ace - limited advance release of six Angels Are Ace tracks plus "Cardboard Song" ([Advanced] Cat Skills, 2006, CD)

=== Singles ===
- "Evel Knievel"/"In The River" (May Go Zero, 7", 2003)
- "Waltz"/"Cull" - Split 7" with Chris T-T (Wrath Records, December 2003)
- "Where's The Captain?" (Wrath Records, CDEP, 2004)
- "Sir Wants Sex"/"Copier" - Split 7" with The Secret Hairdresser (Wrath Records, 2005)
- "Joe C (is and idiot)"/"Mean Man" - Split 7" with The Aprons (Hungry Audio, 2006)
- "Ahhhh Song" (Sour Puss Records, DD, June 2007)
- "Metal Queen Theme"/"Sir Wants Sex" (This Is Fake DIY, 7", Dec 2007)

=== Compilation appearances ===
- In Praise of the Kitten - track "Angelina Jolie" (Kabukikore, 2003)
- Truck 8 - exclusive track "You're Very, Very Ugly" (Truck Records, 2004)
- Wombatonebat - track "Fear Me Gaijin" (Nr One Records, 2006)
- Wrathstonbury - track "High Horse" (Wrath, 2007)
