= Organ (magazine) =

British independent magazine

- Categories: Music, Art, Underculture
- First issue: 4 December 1986
- Country: United Kingdom
- Based in: London
- Language: English
- Website: organthing.com

Organ (Note: or The Organ: "in the long long life of Organ we’ve never actually worked out if there is a The or not.") is a British independent magazine covering music, art and underculture. Based in London, the magazine was founded in 1986 as a handmade fanzine and has evolved many times over the years. It has covered a variety of punk, alternative, rock, progressive, metal and experimental music as well as a wide range of contemporary art and visual artists.

The Organ is run by Sean Worrall and Organart, a music group which includes a radio and TV show, a mail-order music distribution system, artwork, animation and video making, gig promotion (there have been over 1000 Organ shows in London, many big names have made their first London moves via Organ gigs) and Org records.

Org Records (stylised as ORG Records) is an alternative record label which has released material by bands including Cardiacs, Dream City Film Club, Cay, Sleepy People, The Brian Jonestown Massacre, King Prawn, My Vitriol, Pop-A Cat-a-Petal (later Ultrasound), The Monsoon Bassoon, Breed 77, Pure Reason Revolution, Cynical Smile, Inaura, Rhatigan, Cheesecake Truck, Everything Must Go, Sonic Boom Boys and many others.

The label released several Cardiacs EPs and published the 2001 compilation Cardiacs and Affectionate Friends, collecting recent songs by the band and pieces from other associated projects.

Some of the bands who have made their first or very early moves via the ORGAN RADIO series of compilation albums include 65daysofstatic, Sikth, I-DEF-I, PULKAS, King Prawn, Lostprophets, earthtone9, Cortizone, Miocene, CHARGER, Skindred, One Minute Silence, Aerobitch, Raging Speedhorn.

The Organ magazine has existed as a fanzine, a glossy print magazine, a folded A3 paper newsheet and a website, a cassette magazine, indeed one issue of Organ was printed on a t-shirt.

Currently, Organ is a very busy on-line magazine, with daily updated contemporary art, alternative music news and reviews. There is also a weekly radio programme on the London community radio station Resonance FM presented by the Organ team on Sunday nights at 9.00 PM.

Organ is noted for its fanzine nature and alternative DIY ethic; this includes a diversity of coverage, an energetic and subjective stream of consciousness writing style, and some independence and its role in publicising new talent. The magazine has been known to find new or neglected acts long before the mainstream music press or industry.

The fanzine followed Cardiacs with attention and established an intense relationship with Tim Smith and his associates, publishing admiring reports and long, frequent interviews. Organ's review of the band's 1995 double album Sing to God stated that one track can contain enough ideas for most other band's careers. After Smith's 2020 death, the fanzine said "R.I.P Tim Smith, he of Cardiacs, the leader of the starry skies...".
