= Bright Spirit =

Studio album by Gong
- Released: 13 March 2026
- Studios: Snorkel Studios, London
- Length: 42:37
- Label: Kscope
- Producers: Frank Byng and Gong

Gong chronology
Unending Ascending (2023)	Bright Spirit (2026)

Singles from Bright Spirit
- 1. "Stars in Heaven" Released: 19 Dec 2025; 2. "The Wonderment" Released: 6 Jan 2026

Professional ratings
Review scores
Source	Rating
Background Magazine	4+/5
Infrared Magazine	8/10
Prog Archives	4/5

Bright Spirit is the seventeenth studio album by Gong, released on 13 March 2026 by Kscope. It is described by the band themselves as the third installment in a trilogy that began with two previous albums: The Universe Also Collapses (2019) and Unending Ascending (2023).

== Track listing ==
Music by Gong. Lyrics by Kavus Torabi.

1. "Dream of Mine " – 10:30
2. "Mantivule" – 6:19
3. "The Wonderment" – 5:09
4. "Stars in Heaven" – 3:57
5. "Fragrance of Paradise" – 7:36
6. "Relish the Possibility" – 3:08
7. "Eternal Hand" – 6:48

== Personnel ==
- Ian East – flute and saxophone
- Fabio Golfetti – guitar and vocals
- Cheb Nettles – drums and vocals
- Dave Sturt – bass guitar and vocals
- Kavus Torabi – vocals and guitar

Technical

- Recorded and mixed by Frank Byng at Snorkel Studios, London
- Produced by Frank Byng and Gong
- Mastered by James Plotkin

Artwork

- Artwork @fiftysevendesign

== Charts ==
Chart performance for Bright Spirit
Chart (2026)	Peak position
UK Album Sales (OCC)	
UK Album Downloads (Official Charts)	24
UK Physical Albums (OCC)	
UK Progressive Albums (Official Charts)	8
UK Rock & Metal Albums (Official Charts)	6
UK Independent Albums (Official Charts)	10
