= Knifeworld =

British-based psychedelic rock band

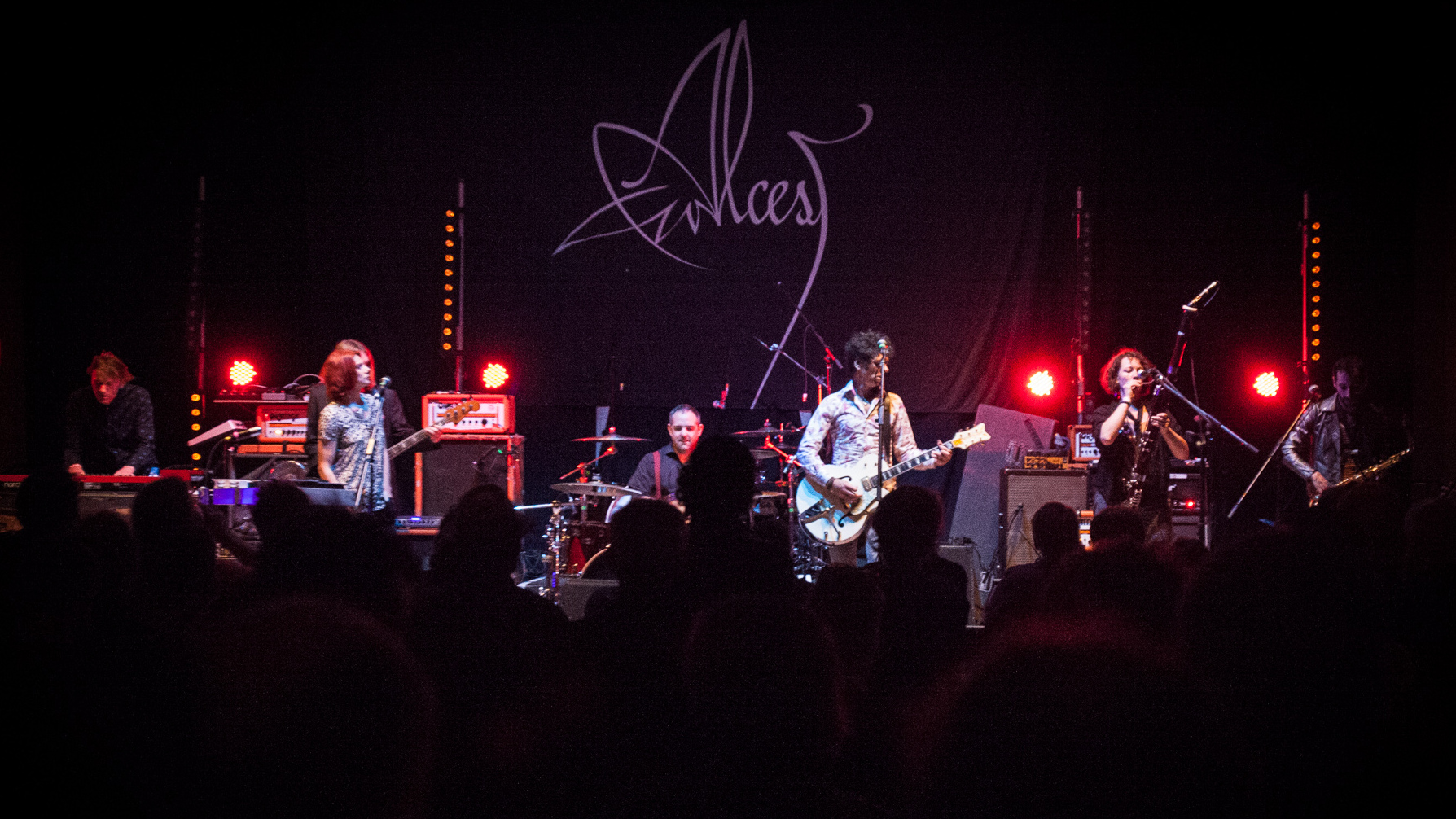
- Knifeworld performing at Tramlines 2015

Background information
- Origin: London, England
- Genres: Psychedelic rock; progressive rock; art rock; avant-pop
- Years active: 2009–2018
- Labels: Believers Roast; Inside Out
- Members: Kavus Torabi; Melanie Woods; Emmett Elvin; Chloe Herington; Charlie Cawood; Ben Woollacott; Josh Perl; Oliver Sellwood
- Past members: Khyam Allami; Craig Fortnam; Nicki Maher
- Website: knifeworld.co.uk

Knifeworld was a British-based psychedelic rock band led by Kavus Torabi. Originally a Torabi solo project, it became a full band in summer 2009. Knifeworld had connections with various English musical projects both inside and outside the rock world, having shared members with Cardiacs, Chrome Hoof, North Sea Radio Orchestra and Sidi Bou Said (London-based oud player Khyam Allami also served as the band's original drummer).

== History ==
=== Beginnings ===
Born in Tehran before moving to England while still a baby, Torabi had previously played with a succession of bands. Beginning his career in Die Laughing in Plymouth, he moved to London and came to public attention as one of the two singing guitarists in the Monsoon Bassoon. Playing what Torabi described as "lysergic funk" and various reviewers described as psychedelia and math rock, the Monsoon Bassoon scored three Singles of the Week in a row in New Musical Express in 1997 and 1998 and released a single album, I Dig Your Voodoo before splitting up in 2001. During this time Torabi had become a well-established member of the group of musicians focused around Cardiacs, whom he joined as guitarist in 2003, playing with them until the group's enforced halt in 2008.

Torabi had formulated the ideas for Knifeworld as a solo project at around the time of the breakup of the Monsoon Bassoon, but took eight years to assemble, finalise and record the songs.

=== Solo project ===
For the band's first recordings, Torabi played the bulk of the instruments himself (guitars, bass guitar, keyboards, santoor, melodica, violins and "devices") as well as singing the majority of the lead vocals and writing, producing, and arranging all of the material. Former Sidi Bou Said drummer Melanie Woods sang the rest of the lead vocals and also sang backing vocals.

The recording sessions featured further contributions from a broad swathe of musical collaborators drawn from Torabi's contacts on the London art-rock scene. Drums were played by Khyam Allami (ex-Ursa and Art of Burning Water). James Larcombe (Stars in Battledress/North Sea Radio Orchestra) played piano and Ben Jacobs (a.k.a. Max Tundra) played keyboards and trumpet. Katherine Blake (Mediæval Bæbes) played recorder and Crawford Blair (Geiger Counter/Foe/The Slow Life) contributed some bass guitar parts. Torabi's former Monsoon Bassoon bandmate Sarah Measures contributed saxophone, clarinet and flute, and further vocals were provided by Shona Davidson and former Ring singer Johnny Karma.

The debut Knifeworld album, Buried Alone: Tales of Crushing Defeat, was released on Torabi's own Believer's Roast label (via Genepool distribution) on 17 August 2009. It was preceded by the download single "Pissed Up On Brake Fluid" on 13 July 2009.

=== Full-band years ===
In summer 2009 Torabi set up a live Knifeworld band, led by himself as singer and guitarist, with Woods remaining as second vocalist and Allami as drummer. Three new members were added: bass guitarist Craig Fortnam (better known as the leader of North Sea Radio Orchestra) and two members of the avant-garde rock orchestra Chrome Hoof (keyboard player Emmett Elvin and bassoonist/saxophonist/backing singer Chloe Herington). The live band made their debut at 93 Feet East, Spitalfields, London on 18 August 2009. Soon afterwards, Torabi formally established this live line-up as a permanent Knifeworld, transforming it from a solo project to a full band.

In winter 2010, Knifeworld began to make new recordings. In December, the first full band recording emerged: a cover version of the Cardiacs song 'The Stench of Honey' appeared on Leader of the Starry Skies: A Tribute to Tim Smith, Songbook 1 (a fundraising compilation album to benefit the hospitalised Cardiacs leader Tim Smith). In July 2011, Knifeworld released the 'Dear Lord, No Deal' EP, another full band recording.

During the winter of 2011, Knifeworld changed its line-up again when both Allami and Fortnam departed amicably to concentrate on their own projects. Torabi recruited former Veils drummer Ben Woollacott, and Charlie Cawood (a multi-instrumentalist who'd also played with Tonochrome, Spiritwo and a host of bands in various disciplines) joined as the new bass guitarist. The new lineup recorded the 'Clairvoyant Fortnight' EP, released in the summer of 2012 (and accompanied by a striking video shot by Thumpermonkey's Michael Woodman, set in an Edwardian seance and featuring a guest appearance by snooker star (and progressive rock advocate) Steve Davis. This period also saw an expansion of the band's line-up, the addition of saxophonists Josh Perl and Nicki Maher making Knifeworld an octet.

In the early autumn of 2012, Knifeworld teamed up with two other bands with similar aims (London's The Fierce and the Dead, and Salford's Trojan Horse) for a series of British gigs called the Stabbing a Dead Horse Tour. The band would play further assorted gigs in the UK during 2013, and in September 2013 released their first new material for over a year - the download-only single "Don't Land On Me", which featured a guest appearance by former Do Me Bad Things singer Chantal Brown and a performance video filmed by the Chaos Engineers.

Having signed to Inside Out Music in early 2014, Knifeworld released their second album, 'The Unravelling', in July of that year. A video for 'Destroy the World We Love' preceded the record's release, also made with the Chaos Engineers. Around this time, Nicki Maher stepped down from the band, and was replaced by Oliver Sellwood (the saxophonist for A Sweet Niche and Workers Union Ensemble). That autumn, Knifeworld made its first proper trip to Europe as main tour support to Amplifier.

In 2015, Knifeworld released a compilation album called Home Of the Newly Departed. This compiled and re-sequenced the songs from the band's two previous EPs Dear Lord, No Deal and Clairvoyant Fortnight as well as adding "Happy Half-life, Dear Friend" (the B-side of the band's debut 7" single "Pissed Up on Brake Fluid"). All tracks were remastered.

In 2016, Knifeworld released their third album Bottled Out Of Eden, which had been recorded at Bob Drake's studio in the Mid-Pyrennees, France, and which featured more songwriting and arranging input from the whole band.

=== Ceasing activities ===
There was comparatively little Knifeworld band activity following the tour to support Bottled Out of Eden, with the band last performing live as support at a Spratley's Japs concert on 21 December 2018 and being reported as being "on hold" in a website post on 30 April 2023. Although the band never issued a formal statement regarding breaking up, Torabi was by now fully concentrating on other musical projects such as Gong, the Utopia Strong and a solo career, while other members went on to (or resumed) projects including VÄLVĒ, My Tricksy Spirit, Lost Crowns, A Sweet Niche, Lindsey Cooper Songbook, The Display Team and Join the Din, plus their own solo work.

In a Facebook post on 4 November 2024, Torabi paid retrospective tribute to the band and the opportunity it provided for composing for a large ensemble, selecting the recording of Bottled Out of Eden as a personal high point, and commenting that "there are a number of reasons Knifeworld stopped being viable and most of them, boringly, are economical."

Looking back on Knifeworld again in January 2026, Torabi reflected "I loved that band but financially it was a catastrophe. Every tour was like setting fire to a suitcase full of money. Gong came a-calling and Knifeworld became unworkable. I like to think I split my Knifeworld energies into Gong and my solo stuff. Gong inheriting the angular riffing, progressive structures and extended instrumental passages, while my solo stuff took on the more introspective, pastoral, self-recorded side."

== Personnel ==
=== Final line-up members ===
- Kavus Torabi – lead vocals, guitars (also keyboards, santoor, "devices", and other instruments on record as and when required)
- Melanie Woods – backing & lead vocals, percussion, glockenspiel (2009–2018)
- Emmett Elvin – electric piano, keyboards, synthesizers (2009–2018)
- Chloe Herington – bassoon, alto saxophone, backing vocals (2009–2018)
- Charlie Cawood – bass guitar (2011–2018)
- Ben Woollacott – drums, percussion (2011–2018)
- Josh Perl – alto saxophone, acoustic guitar, backing vocals (2012–2018)
- Oliver Sellwood – baritone saxophone (2014–2018)

=== Previous members ===
- Khyam Allami – drums (2009–2011)
- Craig Fortnam – bass guitar (2009–2011)
- Nicki Maher – tenor saxophone, clarinet, backing vocals (2012–2014)

== Discography ==
=== Albums ===
- Buried Alone: Tales of Crushing Defeat (2009, Believers Roast)
- The Unravelling (2014, Inside Out)
- Home of the Newly Departed (2015, Believers Roast)
- Bottled Out of Eden (2016, Inside Out)

=== Singles/EPs ===
- "Pissed Up On Brake Fluid" / "Happy Half-Life, Dear Friend" (2009, Believers Roast)
- Dear Lord, No Deal (2011, Believers Roast)
- Clairvoyant Fortnight (2012, Believers Roast)
- "Don't Land on Me" (2013, Believers Roast)
- "High/Aflame" (2016, Inside Out)
