= Christopher Ellis =

Christopher Ellis may refer to:

- Chris Ellis (basketball), a basketball player for the Barangay Ginebra San Miguel team in the Philippine Basketball Association
- Chris Ellis (baseball), baseball player
- Chris Ellis (musician), British songwriter, composer and multi-instrumentalist
- Christopher Ellis (singer) in United Kingdom in the Eurovision Song Contest 1991

== See also ==
- Chris Ellis (disambiguation)
