= Beyond Zade =

EP by Chrome Hoof
- Released: October 16, 2006
- Recorded: 29–30 April 2006 at No by John Hannon
- Genre: Experimental rock, progressive metal
- Length: 48:19
- Label: Rise Above
- Producer: Chrome Hoof & John Hannon

Chrome Hoof chronology
Chrome Hoof (2004)	Beyond Zade (2006)	Pre-Emptive False Rapture (2007)

Beyond Zade is an EP from the British experimental rock band Chrome Hoof. It was released in 2006 on Rise Above Records.

== Track listing ==
1. "Krunching Down (On the Skull of a Newt)" – 6:23
2. "Year Ram" – 7:53
3. "Mad Air Punch" – 20:01
