= Pulsing Signals =

Live album by Gong
- Released: 18 February 2022
- Recorded: 2019
- Venue: The Wardrobe (Leeds); The Cluny (Newcastle); Rescue Rooms (Nottingham)
- Length: 89:27
- Label: Kscope

Gong chronology
The Universe Also Collapses (2019)	Pulsing Signals (2022)	Unending Ascending (2023)

Singles from Unending Ascending
- 1. "My Sawtooth Wake (Live)" Released: 9 December 2021

Professional ratings
Review scores
Source	Rating
Buzz Magazine	4/5 stars

Pulsing Signals is a live album by Gong, released on 18 February 2022 through Kscope and recorded live in 2019 across three shows at The Wardrobe in Leeds, The Cluny in Newcastle and Rescue Rooms in Nottingham during The Universe Also Collapses tour.

The album was released on CD and digital on 18 February and on vinyl on 22 March.

== Track listing ==
All lyrics are written by Kavus Torabi; all music is composed by Ian East, Fabio Golfetti, Cheb Nettles, Dave Sturt and Torabi except where noted.

No.	Title	Lyrics	Music	Length
1.	"What We Was (Intro)" (compiled by Daevid Allen/Sturt)			1:55
2.	"You Can't Kill Me"	Allen	Allen	9:02
3.	"Rejoice!"			9:50
4.	"If Never I'm and Ever You"			2:39
5.	"Kapital"	Allen	Allen; East; Golfetti; Nettles; Sturt; Torabi	4:21
6.	"Master Builder"	Allen; Gilli Smyth; Tim Blake; Didier Malherbe; Mike Howlett; Steve Hillage; Pierre Moerlen	Allen; Smyth; Blake; Malherbe; Howlett; Hillage; Moerlen; Miquette Giraudy^{[a]}	15:45
7.	"Forever Reoccurring"			22:40
8.	"My Sawtooth Wake"			12:43
9.	"Insert Yr Own Prophecy"			10:32
Total length:				89:27

Notes

- ^{^[a]} Giraudy is only credited as a composer on Tidal.

== Personnel ==
Credits are adapted from the liner notes of Pulsing Signals.

- Ian East – tenor & soprano saxophones
- Fabio Golfetti – guitar & singing
- Cheb Nettles – drums & singing
- Dave Sturt – bass guitar, noises & singing
- Kavus Torabi – singing & guitar

Technical

- Recorded by Pete Wibrew
- Mixed by Frank Byng at Snorkel Studios, London 2021
- Mastered by Andy Jackson at Tube Mastering

Artwork

- Artwork and layout at 57design.co.uk
- All photographs by Stephen Heliczer

== Charts ==
Chart performance for Pulsing Signals
Chart (2022)	Peak position
UK Rock & Metal Albums (OCC)	15
