= The Banishing (album) =

Studio album by Kavus Torabi
- Released: 3 May 2024
- Genres: Psychedelic rock; dreampop
- Length: 42:18
- Label: Believers Roast

Kavus Torabi chronology
Heaven's Sun (2023)	The Banishing (2024)	October by Name (2026)

Singles from The Banishing
- 1. "Snake Humanis" Released: 6 March 2024; 2. "Heart the Same" Released: 5 April 2024

Professional ratings
Review scores
Source	Rating
Classic Rock	8/10 stars
Guitarist	9/10
Metal Digest	8/10
Prog	4/5 stars

The Banishing is the second solo album by multi-instrumentalist and composer Kavus Torabi.

== Background ==
Torabi, known as the frontman of the Canterbury scene band Gong and as a member of Cardiacs, released his first solo album, Hip to the Jag, in 2020; 2023 saw the release of Heaven's Sun, an album he made in collaboration with Richard Wileman of Karda Estra.

== Track listing ==
1. "The Horizontal Man" – 5:04
2. "Snake Humanis" – 3:29
3. "Heart the Same" – 7:44
4. "A Thousand Blazing Chariots" – 3:58
5. "The Sweetest Demon" – 5:53
6. "Push the Faders" – 3:55
7. "Mountains of Glass" – 7:51
8. "Untethered" – 4:24

== Personnel ==
Musicians

- Kavus Torabi – guitars (with guitar pedals, ebow, gliss and other modifications), bass, Fender Rhodes, Prophet synthesiser, santoor, vichitra veena, harmonium, snare, tambourine, ride cymbal, bass drum, autoharp, hand claps, double bass, guzheng, shakers, prayer bells, glockenspiel

With:

- Kate Davis – flute (track 2)
