= Chris Ellis =

Chris Ellis may refer to:

- Chris Ellis (actor) (born 1956), actor who performed in movies such as My Cousin Vinny and Days of Thunder
- Chris Ellis (American football) (born 1985), free agent defensive end
- Chris Ellis (basketball) (born 1988), a basketball player for the Barangay Ginebra San Miguel team in the Philippine Basketball Association
- Chris Ellis (baseball) (born 1992), baseball player
- Chris Ellis (musician), British songwriter, composer and multi-instrumentalist

== See also ==
- Christopher Ellis (disambiguation)
