= The Universe Also Collapses =

Studio album by Gong
- Released: 10 May 2019
- Studio: Snorkel Studios, London
- Genre: Psychedelic rock
- Length: 43:01
- Label: Kscope
- Producer: Gong

Gong chronology
Rejoice! I'm Dead! (2016)	The Universe Also Collapses (2019)	Pulsing Signals (2022)

Singles from The Universe Also Collapses
- 1. "The Elemental" Released: 28 February 2019

Professional ratings
Review scores
Source	Rating
PopMatters	8/10

The Universe Also Collapses is the fifteenth studio album by the psychedelic rock band Gong, released on 10 May 2019 by Kscope. The album was highly acclaimed.

== Track listing ==
All music by Gong; lyrics by Kavus Torabi.

1. "Forever Reoccurring" – 20:36
2. "If Never I'm and Ever You" – 2:27
3. "My Sawtooth Wake" – 13:15
4. "The Elemental" – 6:43

== Personnel ==
- Ian East – flute, bass clarinet, soprano, tenor and baritone saxophone
- Fabio Golfetti – electric guitar, gliss guitar and singing
- Cheb Nettles – drums, piano, theremin and singing
- Dave Sturt – bass guitar, synthesiser and singing
- Kavus Torabi – singing, electric guitar, acoustic guitar and harmonium

Technical

- Recorded and mixed by Frank Byng at Snorkel Studios, London
- Produced by Gong
- Mastered by Andy Jackson at Tube Mastering

Artwork

- Artwork and layout at 57design.co.uk
- Photograph by Xu Yiming

== Charts ==
Chart performance for The Universe Also Collapses
Chart (2019)	Peak position
Scottish Albums (OCC)	32
UK Album Sales (OCC)	40
UK Album Downloads (OCC)	34
UK Vinyl Albums (OCC)	25
UK Record Store (OCC)	25
UK Rock & Metal Albums (OCC)	3
UK Independent Albums (OCC)	15
UK Independent Album Breakers (OCC)	2
