= Medical Grade Music =

2021 autobiographical book by Steve Davis and Kavus Torabi

- Ebook and hardcover version
- Author: Steve Davis and Kavus Torabi
- Language: English
- Genre: Autobiography
- Published: 2021 (Orion)
- Publication place: United Kingdom
- Media type: Print
- ISBN: 9781474619509

Medical Grade Music (2021) is an autobiographical book written by English former snooker player Steve Davis and Iranian-born musician Kavus Torabi. It focuses on the duo's shared affinity for psychedelic and progressive music. It also serves as a tribute to the late radio presenter John Peel.

== Critical reception ==
The book received mostly positive reviews. Paul Stevens of Louder Than War called the book "a great primer on music that falls outside of the Great Punk Rock War narrative and reveals a golden musical seam among the greatcoats, gloom and grease of the early 1970s" and complimented the contrast of Davis and Torabi's perspectives.
