= Rejoice! I'm Dead! =

Studio album by Gong
- Released: 16 September 2016
- Recorded: Spring 2016
- Studio: Brixton Hill Studios and Beyond
- Genre: Progressive rock
- Length: 59:41
- Label: Madfish
- Producer: Gong

Gong chronology
I See You (2014)	Rejoice! I'm Dead! (2016)	The Universe Also Collapses (2019)

Professional ratings
Aggregate scores
Source	Rating
Metacritic	65/100
Review scores
Source	Rating
Blurt	3/5 stars
Classic Rock	3.5/5 stars
Record Collector	4/5 stars

Rejoice! I'm Dead! is the fourteenth studio album by Gong, their first to be recorded after the death of band founder Daevid Allen. It was released on 16 September 2016.

== Overview ==
Rejoice! I'm Dead! is the first Gong album to be released since the deaths of co-founders Daevid Allen and Gilli Smyth. Dave Sturt stated about the album: 'Inspired by the light, love and passing of our dear friend and inspiration, Daevid Allen.'

== Recording ==
Recorded at Brixton Hill Studios "and beyond", Spring 2016. 'Model Village' includes a sample of 'Floating Anarchy Manifesto' recorded at the Bananamoon Observatory Studios, Australia 'Glastonbury Town' was made at the Music Room rehearsal studios in London on 22 April 2013. 'The Paragraph Time Chose To Forget' recorded at The Lighthouse, Dealn on 27 January 2016.

DVD : 5.1 Surround Sound mixed at Soord Studios. 5.1 Surround mastered at Super Sound Mastering

== Release ==
The album was released on September 16, 2016 through Madfish on CD (in digipak) and vinyl LP. A double CD / DVD-Audio version in a deluxe 12″ 44 page hardback book is also available featuring the album, a bonus CD of extras and a DVD-Audio disc with 24/96 PCM stereo and DTS 96/24 5.1 digital surround mixes.

== Track listing ==
No.	Title	Lyrics	Music	Length
1.	"The Thing That Should Be"	Kavus Torabi	Ian East; Fabio Golfetti; Cheb Nettles; Dave Sturt; Torabi	3:34
2.	"Rejoice!"	Daevid Allen; Torabi	East; Golfetti; Nettles; Sturt; Torabi	10:17
3.	"Kapital"	Allen	Allen; East; Golfetti; Nettles; Sturt; Torabi	3:21
4.	"Model Village"	Sturt	East; Golfetti; Nettles; Sturt; Torabi	6:43
5.	"Beatrix"	Allen	East; Golfetti; Nettles; Sturt; Torabi	2:54
6.	"Visions"		East; Golfetti; Nettles; Sturt; Torabi	4:29
7.	"The Unspeakable Stands Revealed"	Torabi	East; Golfetti; Nettles; Sturt; Torabi	11:49
8.	"Through Restless Seas I Come"	Torabi	East; Golfetti; Nettles; Sturt; Torabi	6:58
9.	"Insert Yr Own Prophecy"	Torabi	East; Golfetti; Nettles; Sturt; Torabi	9:36
Total length:				59:41

Limitied edition bonus CD
No.	Title	Lyrics	Music	Length
1.	"Floating Anarchy Manifesto"	Allen	Allen	4:27
2.	"Someone You'll Never Be"	Torabi	East; Golfetti; Nettles; Sturt; Torabi	5:55
3.	"Kapital" (Original Demo)	Allen	Allen	2:16
4.	"Electricity" (Original Demo - Became Part of Kapital)		Golfetti	1:58
5.	"Glastonbury Town"	Allen	Allen	8:28
6.	"Celestial Brigadier"		Allen; Sturt; Torabi	14:00
7.	"The Paragraph Time Chose to Forget"		East; Sturt; Torabi	4:25

DVDA/V - MLP & DTS 5.1 and LPCM stereo
No.	Title	Length
1.	"The Thing That Should Be"
2.	"Rejojce!"
3.	"Kapital"
4.	"Model Village"
5.	"Beatrix"
6.	"Visions"
7.	"The Unspeakable Stands Revealed"
8.	"Through Restless Seas I Come"
9.	"Insert Yr Own Prophecy"

Sample credits

- "Model Village" includes a sample of "Floating Anarchy Manifesto" by Daevid Allen, courtesy of D. A. F. T., recorded by Orlando Monday Allen at The Banana Moon Observatory Studios, Australia

== Personnel ==
"The Thing That Should Be"

- Ian East – soprano/tenor sax
- Fabio Golfetti – guitar, vocals
- Cheb Nettles – drums, vocals
- Dave Sturt – bass, vocals
- Kavus Torabi – vocals, guitar

with

- Graham Clark – violin

"Rejoice!"

- Ian East – soprano/tenor/baritone sax, swanee whistles, bells, shakers
- Fabio Golfetti – guitar, gliss guitar, vocals
- Cheb Nettles – drums, vocals
- Dave Sturt – bass, vocals
- Kavus Torabi – vocals, guitar

with

- Steve Hillage – guitar

"Kapital"

- Ian East – tenor sax
- Fabio Golfetti – guitar, vocals
- Cheb Nettles – drums
- Dave Sturt – bass
- Kavus Torabi – vocals, guitar

"Model Village"

- Ian East – soprano/tenor sax, flute
- Fabio Golfetti – vocals, guitar
- Cheb Nettles – drums
- Dave Sturt – bass, keyboards, percussion, vocals
- Kavus Torabi – guitar

with

- Didier Malherbe – duduk

"Beatrix"

- Daevid Allen – vocals
- Ian East – tenor sax
- Chris Ellis – piano
- Dave Sturt – acoustic bass, hi bass EBow

"Visions"

- Ian East – soprano sax
- Fabio Golfetti – gliss guitar
- Dave Sturt – hi bass EBow
- Kavus Torabi – vocals

"The Unspeakable Stands Revealed"

- Ian East – soprano/tenor sax
- Fabio Golfetti – guitar, gliss guitar
- Cheb Nettles – drums, vocals
- Dave Sturt – bass, vocals
- Kavus Torabi – vocals, guitars

"Through Restless Seas I Come"

- Ian East – soprano sax, flute
- Fabio Golfetti – gliss guitar
- Cheb Nettles – drums, percussion
- Dave Sturt – bass, keyboards
- Kavus Torabi – vocals, guitar

with

- Didier Malherbe – duduk

"Insert Yr Own Prophecy"

- Ian East – soprano/tenor sax
- Fabio Golfetti – guitar
- Cheb Nettles – drums, vocals
- Dave Sturt – bass, EBow bass
- Kavus Torabi – vocals, guitars

=== Bonus CD ===
"Floating Anarchy Manifesto"

- Written and performed by Daevid Allen

"Someone You'll Never Be"

- Ian East – soprano/tenor sax, flute
- Fabio Golfetti – guitar
- Cheb Nettles – drums, vocals
- Dave Sturt – acoustic bass, hi atmos bass, keyboards
- Kavus Torabi – vocals, guitar, EBow guitar

with

- Graham Clark – violin

"Kapital" (Original Demo)

- Daevid Allen – vocals, guitar

"Electricity" (Original Demo - Became Part of Kapital)

- Fabio Golfetti – guitars

"Glastonbury Town"

- Daevid Allen – vocals, guitar
- Ian East – flute
- Dave Sturt – bass
- Kavus Torabi – guitar, EBow guitar

"Celestial Brigadier"

- Daevid Allen – gliss guitar
- Dave Sturt – bass, hi atmos bass
- Kavus Torabi – guitar, EBow guitar

"The Paragraph Time Chose to Forget"

- Ian East – soprano sax
- Dave Sturt – bass, hi atmos bass
- Kavus Torabi – guitar

=== Production credits ===
- Produced by Gong
- Recorded at Brixton Hill Studios and beyond, Spring 2016
- Engineered by Nick Howiantz and Gong
- Mixed by Mark Cawthra at The Infallible Ear except "Beatrix" and "Visions" by Dave Sturt
- Dave Sturt – overseer and gatekeeper
- Mastered by Andy Jackson, Neil Wilkes (tracks: DVD)
- That Girl – cover illustration
- 57design.co.uk – layout, Gong Mandala illustration

== Charts ==
Chart performance for Rejoice! I'm Dead!
Chart (2016)	Peak position
UK Physical Albums (OCC)	97
UK Record Store (OCC)	39
UK Rock & Metal Albums (OCC)	16
UK Independent Albums (OCC)	38
UK Independent Album Breakers (OCC)	7
