= Believers Roast =

British record label

- Founded: 2009
- Founder: Kavus Torabi
- Distributor: Genepool Records
- Genre: Various
- Country of origin: United Kingdom
- Official website: thegenepool.co.uk/b/believers-roast/1.htm

Believers Roast (Note: Also known as Believers Roast Records. No apostrophe, despite some sources.) is a record label formed in 2009 by musician Kavus Torabi, initially to only release recordings by Torabi and his band Knifeworld. The label expanded with the fundraising album Leader of the Starry Skies: A Tribute to Tim Smith in 2010 and has since released the collaborative album The Exquisite Corpse Game (2013) and albums by artists including Thumpermonkey, The Gasman, Karda Estra, Arch Garrison, and respective band members.

== History ==
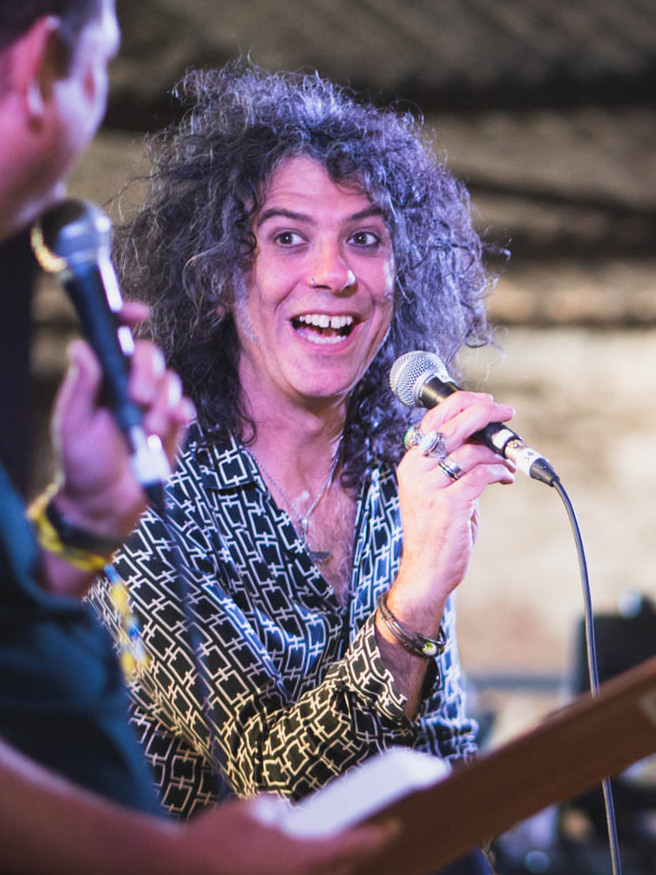
Kavus Torabi (pictured in 2022) started Believers Roast to release his own recordings.

Founder Kavus Torabi set up Believers Roast in 2009. The label was initially conceived to only release recordings relating to Torabi and his band Knifeworld, which started out as a solo project. The label released the first Knifeworld single, "Pissed Up on Brake Fluid", on 13 July, and debut album Buried Alone: Tales of Crushing Defeat in August. The label expanded upon its second major release, Leader of the Starry Skies, a tribute album by various artists to Cardiacs founder and frontman Tim Smith which aimed to raise funds towards his care. Released on 13 December 2010, Torabi was also among those who helped assemble the musicians for the album, which features contributions from the Magic Numbers, Oceansize, Andy Partridge of XTC and Julianne Regan of All About Eve among others. Released through Believers Roast as no other labels were willing to take 0%, the endeavour raised the band's profile further.

Believers Roast released the Knifeworld EP Dear Lord, No Deal on 4 July 2011, the first recording to feature a full band line-up. With the label, Torabi planned to release a boxset of studio recordings by his former band the Monsoon Bassoon that summer. In 2012, the album Sleep Furiously by art rock quartet Thumpermonkey was released through Believers Roast. In 2013, the label announced the collaborative album The Exquisite Corpse Game, where each artist contributed a one to four minute-long instrumental passage called a "fold" after hearing the end of the preceding track, in reference to the Surrealist technique Exquisite Corpse. The album was released on 2 September, recorded by a cast of collaborators including JG Thirlwell, Appleblim and Max Tundra. Other players assembled by Torabi include the left-field artists Weasel Walter, Khyam Allami and Bob Drake. Despite Joe Banks of the magazine Prog calling Believers Roast a boutique label, Torabi thought it to be an insult to a boutique label to call Believers Roast one due to its small size.

It's the most bizarre label – I don't make a penny out of it. To release stuff on the label, it's me saying, 'Yep, I really like this, I'd like to put it out.' Everything on it is in a different genre – there's no one sound.

— Kavus Torabi, 2014

The Gasman, an alias of Portsmouth resident Christopher Reeves, released the albums Hiding Place and Hiding Place #2 on Believers Roast in 2012 and 2014 respectively, which feature complex digital piano compositions. He has also released albums on the other Cardiacs-adjacent label Onomatopoeia. Torabi allowed German label Inside Out Music to release Knifeworld's second album The Unravelling (2014) rather than Believers Roast. In 2015, Believers Roast released the album Strange Relations by Karda Estra, a project of composer and multi-instrumentalist Richard Wileman, and folk group Admirals Hard's album Upon a Painted Ocean in 2016. Torabi released the three track EP Solar Divination through the label in 2018, followed by the solo album Hip to the Jag on 22 May 2020. Arch Garrison's third record The Bitter Lay was released on the label on 18 September.

Believers Roast released Knifeworld bassoonist Chlöe Herington's first solo album Silent Reflux in 2021, and Thumpermonkey singer and guitarist Michael Woodman's solo album Psithurism on 6 August. Baber Wileman, a collaboration between Sanguine Hum's Matt Baber and Richard Wileman, released their self-titled debut album through Believers Roast on 10 January 2022. North Sea Radio Orchestra's Craig Fortnam released his second solo album Instrumental Music 1 through the label on 17 June, followed by the loose concept album Lunar One. Torabi collaborated with Wileman for the album Heaven's Sun which was released through Believers Roast on 2 June 2023. Wileman released the solo album The Forked Road through Believers Roast on 17 January 2024. Torabi's second solo album The Banishing, which he recorded during lockdown, was released through Believers Roast on May 3, preceded by the singles "Snake Humanis" on March 6 and "Heart the Same" on April 5. Baber and Wileman released their second album, Baber / Wileman 2, through Believers Roast on 3 June 2024. In April, Thumpermonkey guitarist and vocalist Michael Woodman released his debut full-length solo album Hiss of Today through Believers Roast. Torabi released his solo album October by Name on 2 October 2026.

== Discography ==
Adapted from the liner notes of each release and the Genepool website.

No.	Release date	Title	Artist(s)
01	13 July 2009	"Pissed Up on Brake Fluid"	Knifeworld
02	17 August 2009	Buried Alone: Tales of Crushing Defeat	Knifeworld
03	13 December 2010	Leader of the Starry Skies: A Tribute to Tim Smith, Songbook 1	Various artists
03	13 December 2010	A Loyal Companion: A Tribute to Tim Smith	Various artists
04	4 July 2011	Dear Lord, No Deal	Knifeworld
05	16 August 2011	#1 If It Fights the Hammer It Will Fight the Knife	Redbus Noface
06	10 November 2011	Believers Roast Presents: The Central Element	Various artists
07	26 March 2012	Hiding Place	The Gasman
08	11 June 2012	Clairvoyant Fortnight	Knifeworld
09	31 October 2012	Sleep Furiously	Thumpermonkey
10	2 September 2013	The Exquisite Corpse Game	Various artists
11	22 July 2013	Mondo Profondo / New Worlds	Karda Estra
12	1 November 2013	Mandrake	Rael Jones
13	10 February 2014	Hiding Place # 2	The Gasman
14	12 May 2014	Severance Pay	Dead Days Beyond Help
15	16 June 2014	In Droplet Form	Stars in Battledress
16	9 February 2015	Strange Relations	Karda Estra
17	25 May 2015	Home of the Newly Departed	Knifeworld
18	17 June 2016	Upon a Painted Ocean	Admirals Hard
19	2 June 2016	Time and Stars	Karda Estra
20	20 February 2017	Infernal Spheres	Karda Estra
21	21 March 2018	Veil	Richard Wileman
22	23 March 2018	Solar Divination	Kavus Torabi
23	22 May 2020	Hip to the Jag	Kavus Torabi
24	18 September 2020	The Bitter Lay	Arch Garrison
25	21 September 2020	Arcana	Richard Wileman
26	18 January 2021	Silent Reflux	Chlöe Herington
27	6 August 2021	Psithurism	Michael Woodman
28	17 June 2022	Instrumental Music 1	Craig Fortnam
29	10 January 2022	Baber / Wileman	Matt Baber & Richard Wileman (Baber / Wileman)
29	18 November 2022	Lunar One A-Sides	Craig Fortnam
30	2 June 2023	Heaven's Sun	Kavus Torabi & Richard Wileman
31	12 January 2024	The Forked Road	Richard Wileman
32	3 May 2024	The Banishing	Kavus Torabi
33	2 February 2024	Bespoke Guitar Pieces	Craig Fortnam
34	3 June 2024	Baber / Wileman 2	Matt Baber & Richard Wileman (Baber / Wileman)
36	28 August 2024	Bespoke String Trios	Craig Fortnam
37	26 April 2025	Hiss of Today	Michael Woodman
38	30 May 2025	Special Powers	North Sea Radio Orchestra
39	4 April 2025	The Heart Is in the Body	Lost Crowns
40	2 October 2026	October by Name	Kavus Torabi
