= Kavus Torabi =

British guitarist

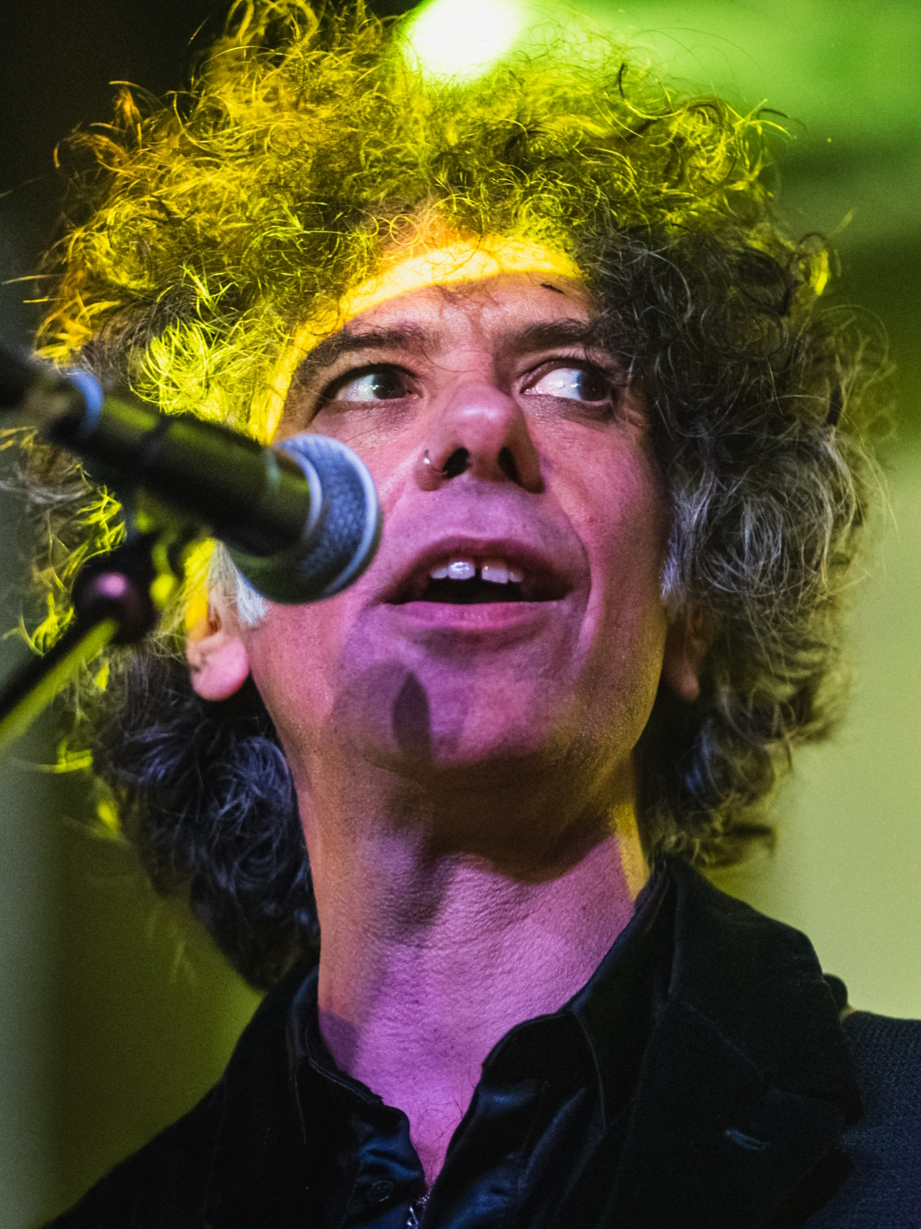
- Torabi in 2025
- Born: 5 December 1971 (age 54); Tehran, Iran
- Occupations: Musician; composer; producer; DJ; record label owner; radio broadcaster; artist; author
- Known for: Music, writing and visual art
- Spouse: Dawn Staple (m. 2003)
- Children: 1
- Musical career
- Origin: Plymouth, Devon, England
- Genres: Psychedelia; progressive rock; punk rock; pop
- Instruments: Guitar; vocals; bass guitar; harmonium; synthesizer
- Years active: 1988–present
- Label: Believers Roast
- Member of: Admirals Hard; Cardiacs; Guapo; Knifeworld; Gong; The Utopia Strong; The Holy Family
- Formerly of: Die Laughing; The Monsoon Bassoon; Miss Helsinki; North Sea Radio Orchestra; Authority; Hatchjaw and Bassett; Chrome Hoof; Miranda Sex Garden
- Kavus Torabi's voice Discussing the writing of Tim Smith; Recorded January 2023

Kavus Torabi (born 5 December 1971) is a British musician, composer, record label owner and radio broadcaster. Described as a "psychedelic polymath", he is a multi-instrumentalist known for his work in the psychedelic, avant-garde rock field. Rising to prominence as a member of Cardiacs, Torabi has fronted and played guitar for the progressive rock band Gong since 2014 and led the band Knifeworld from 2009 to 2018. He has since been active as a solo artist and one-third of the electronic band the Utopia Strong.

Born in Iran of English and Iranian decent, Torabi moved to the UK in 1973 and was raised in Plymouth. He was a founding member of the Monsoon Bassoon, whose album I Dig Your Voodoo (1999) was produced by Tim Smith, the leader of Cardiacs. Torabi worked as Cardiacs' guitar technician for eight years and, after the breakup of the Monsoon Bassoon, replaced Jon Poole as second guitarist and vocalist for three shows in 2003 performing the band's early material captured on the live album The Special Garage Concerts (2005). Torabi wrote the words for the 2007 single "Ditzy Scene", his first Cardiacs studio work, and was a member when the band went into an indefinite hiatus in 2008 due to Smith experiencing neurological problems following a cardiac arrest. Knifeworld, with Melanie Woods as Torabi's co-singer, carried forward Cardiacs' melodic, complex type of music. Five years after Smith's death, LSD was released in 2025 as the only Cardiacs studio album with Torabi.

With the snooker player Steve Davis, Torabi co-presented the radio show The Interesting Alternative Show on Phoenix FM between 2010 and 2018 and has DJ'd at events. Through the show, Torabi was introduced to Gong founder Daevid Allen by Davis and joined Gong as an additional guitarist, debuting on the 2014 album I See You. Due to Allen's cancer, from which Allen died in 2015, Gong continued with Torabi as frontman and principal songwriter, releasing the studio albums Rejoice! I'm Dead! (2016), The Universe Also Collapses (2019), Unending Ascending (2023) and Bright Spirit (2026). Torabi's first solo venture, the EP Solar Divination, was released in 2018, followed by the solo albums Hip to the Jag (2020), The Banishing (2024) and October by Name (2026). Torabi and Davis also co-founded the Utopia Strong with Michael J. York in 2018, and wrote the joint autobiography Medical Grade Music (2021).

== Early life ==
Torabi was born on 5 December 1971 in Tehran, Iran, to an Iranian father and an English mother. His family moved to the UK when he was eighteen months old in 1973; originally planning to return once his father had made sufficient money, but ending up settling permanently following the 1979 Iranian Revolution. Torabi has said most of his family remains in Iran, but he himself has never returned due to the compulsory two years national service he would have to serve. Torabi was raised in Plymouth.

According to Torabi his parents "weren't really into music, and there wasn’t much around the house." He recalls his mother having three or four albums and knowing between two and four chords which she tried to teach him, which he said caused an aversion to learning chords that was "probably the starting point" to his peculiar musical style. In an interview, Torabi recalled trying to make a snare drum out of a biscuit tin and cling-film before moving onto the guitar. He was interested in the music from TV shows, inventing his own form of notation and using it to score out the theme from CHiPs. When he was about seven, his family bought a piano and he used it as a compositional tool – already writing songs of his own, he showed little interest in learning those of others. From 1980, he became interested in music through Brian Setzer and Stray Cats after seeing them on Saturday morning TV, thinking, "Oh god, this is what I wanna be. I've got to be this guy." Eight years later, aged sixteen, he discovered his main musical touchstone in the form of Cardiacs, although in the interim he had taught himself more about music by sequential obsessions with various other bands and music forms. Torabi, a devoted fan of Cardiacs, was a 16-year-old student when he heard the band's first proper album A Little Man and a House and the Whole World Window in 1988 which a friend had lent him.

In his early 20s and late teens, Torabi often took LSD and wrote music with it. He credits psychedelics with rewiring his mind in a positive way and allowing him to turn his life around from the "very miserable life" he could have had, given his upbringing. Torabi made decision to move to London and take music seriously while on LSD. He moved from Plymouth to London when he was 21.

== Career ==
=== 1988–2001: Die Laughing and the Monsoon Bassoon, working with Tim Smith ===
Torabi's first significant band was the Plymouth-based death/thrash metal band Die Laughing, formed in 1988, in which he played guitar and first met his close friend and collaborator, Dan Chudley. (Chudley – a fellow guitarist and singer – has been part of Torabi's life for most of his musical career, and the two are noted for their interlocking, highly complex guitar style.) Die Laughing released three demos before they eventually split in 1993.

In 1994, Torabi reunited with Chudley, who had been playing in a band called Squid Squad since the previous year. The two formed a new band called the Monsoon Bassoon, Torabi a founding member, in which they were joined by bass player Laurie Osbourne and two more Squid Squad members (singing clarinet/flute/sax player Sarah Measures and drummer Jamie Keddie). Their musical – an energetic and tuneful form of psychedelic math rock – was built around Torabi and Chudley's singular compositions. The group soon relocated from Plymouth to Leyton, East London and began to gain underground attention, releasing recordings on their own Weird Neighbourhood Records label.

Torabi, a guitarist and vocalist of the Monsoon Bassoon, was one of the band's three frontpeople and the visual focus. In a review of the band on stage at The Water Rats in London, NME noted how the "sylvan idyll" of singer and clarinet and flute player Sarah Measures "is bulldozed by the sound of guitarists Daniel Chudley and Kavus Torabi attempting to raze the venue to the ground by sheer volume alone."

The band's debut single "Wise Guy" was described by Matt Evans of The Quietus as "an extraordinary 7" single – five minutes of herky-jerky guitar pop, bafflingly intricate interlocking guitars, innumerable time changes, passages of crushing heaviness, stop-start absurdity and lush three-part male and female vocal harmonies, culminating in a lengthy instrumental math-rock/free-blowing woodwind meltdown." NME said "The chattering vocal interplay between guitarist Kavus Torabi and occasional clarinettist Sarah Measures always seems to be teetering on the verge of chaos, but as forthcoming space-punk opus 'The King Of Evil' shows, they’re well on their way to being frighteningly competent."

In the mid-90s, Torabi met Tim Smith, the leader of Cardiacs. Cardiacs were a major influence on the Monsoon Bassoon, and Smith produced their album I Dig Your Voodoo (1999). In a review for the album, NME noted how the "mesh of jumpy woodwind melodies" at the star of the song "Blue Junction" were softened by Torabi's "spooked bark". Since the mid-1990s, Torabi had had a close working relationship with Smith, who produced the majority of the Monsoon Bassoon's recordings.

Despite scoring several Single of the Week awards in New Musical Express, the Monsoon Bassoon failed to get signed to a larger label or make a significant commercial breakthrough, although they did receive critical acclaim and a cult following for their unorthodox approach and sound. The band released a lone, well-regarded studio album (I Dig Your Voodoo) and five singles, and split up in 2001 following the exit of Keddie. Many of the band's recordings remain unreleased.

Before the split of the Monsoon Bassoon, Torabi toured as guitarist with former Pogues member Spider Stacy's group, Wisemen (which also featured other ex-Pogues). After line-up changes, the group became The Vendettas. Torabi co-wrote and produced an album with Spider in 2003, but the project was shelved in the wake of the Pogues' reunion that year. Torabi has subsequently expressed an interest in releasing the album on his own Believers Roast label.

==== Other projects ====
Since the breakup of the Monsoon Bassoon, Torabi has maintained an ongoing (if interrupted) musical relationship with Dan Chudley, resulting in several other projects. The first of these was Miss Helsinki, a more straightforward rock band which recorded a couple of tracks and played a few acoustic gigs in 2002. The band failed to find a steady lineup (despite assistance from Richard Larcombe from Stars In Battledress and from Monsoon Bassoon drummer Jamie Keddie) and consequently folded. Torabi, Chudley and Keddie worked together again when they formed another rock band, Authority, in 2005 (the lineup was completed by Craig Fortnam of North Sea Radio Orchestra on bass). Authority recorded several songs and played live over the next two years, but never released anything beyond a couple of MySpace uploads. The band split in 2007 due to the various members' other commitments and Chudley's move to Cornwall.

Torabi and Chudley have worked on another project together – the instrumental Hatchjaw and Bassett, which Chudley has described as "acoustic spiritual music". This project has not released any records, although a video featuring the duo and their music has appeared on YouTube.

Torabi is a member of Admirals Hard, an occasional "sea-shanty supergroup" made up of members of London math-rock bands and avant-garde folk groups (Stars in Battledress, Tunng, Max Tundra, Foe and The Monsoon Bassoon) and fronted by singer Andy Carne. Torabi plays mandolin and guitar (and sings backing vocals) for the group.

=== 2003–2006: joining Cardiacs, Guapo and North Sea Radio Orchestra, The Special Garage Concerts by Cardiacs ===
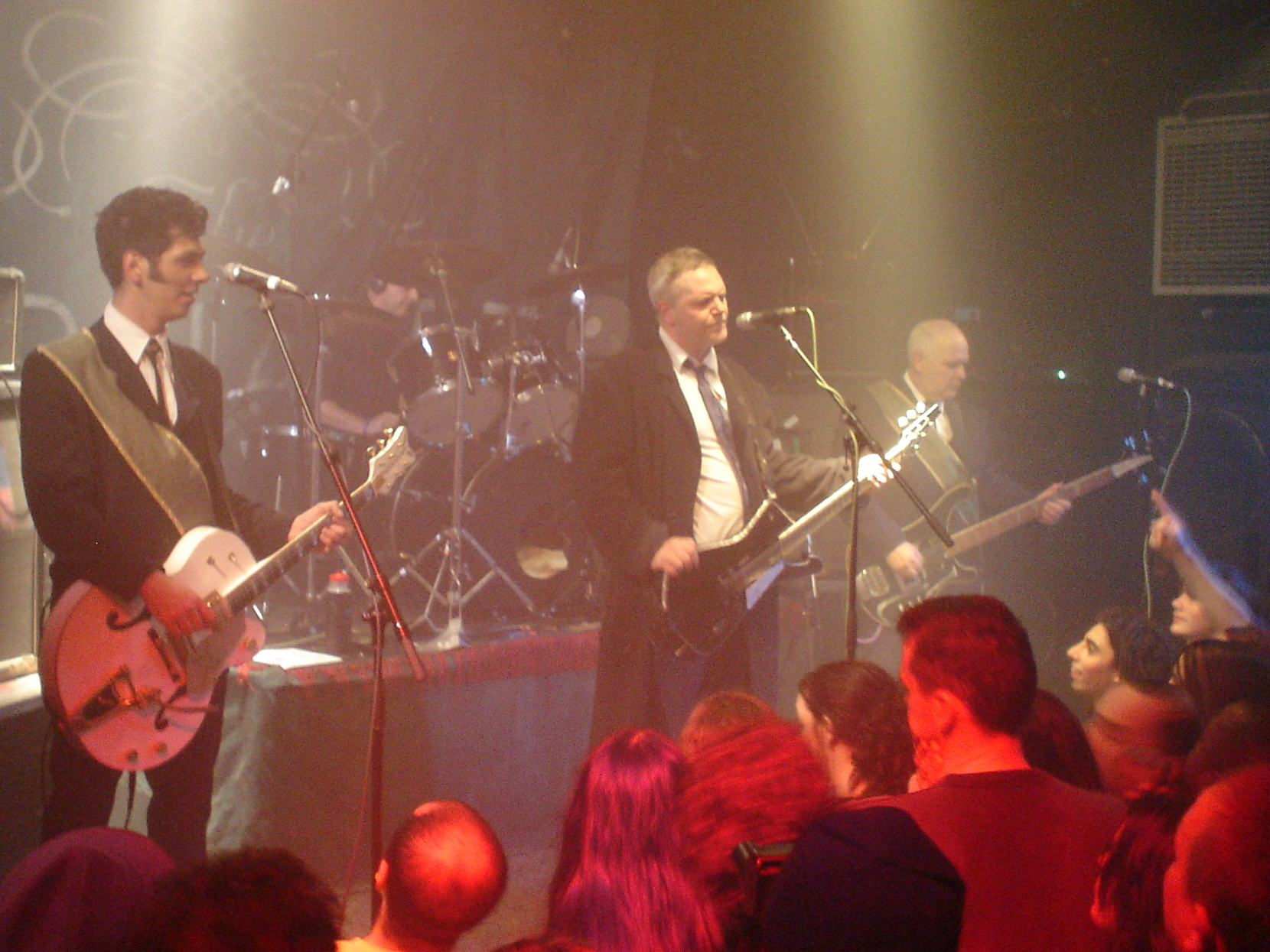
Torabi (left) with Cardiacs at the Bull & Gate in 2005

Torabi rose to prominence as a member of Cardiacs, which featured Torabi as a guitarist and vocalist in later points in the band's career. Prior to becoming a member, Torabi had spent eight years working as the band’s guitar technician. In the early 2000s, Cardiacs guitarist Jon Poole was busy working with the Wildhearts. Tim Smith asked Torabi if he would like to stand in for Poole in his idea for playing the early Cardiacs material that was badly recorded, and Torabi joined the band as second guitarist in 2003. In October 2003, Cardiacs played three consecutive concerts at The Garage in London where they performed more than 33 songs from their early years from 1977 to 1983, Torabi replacing Poole. With a four-piece line-up of Tim Smith, Torabi, Jim Smith and Bob Leith, the best takes from the three-night stand were released in the two-hour 2005 live album The Special Garage Concerts as two different volumes, which the writer Eric Benac called Torabi's "most significant contribution to the band's history". Torabi and Leith were given free rein to do what they wanted with the songs, and Martijn Voorvelt of Perfect Sound Forever noted that learning the songs "must have been particularly hard work" for them as they were not in the original lineup. Dom Lawson of Classic Rock said that the live set "proved to be Cardiacs' last grand gesture as a live band" and that the new line-up featuring Torabi "brought Tim Smith's songs vividly to life in front of a hysterical audience of devotees". Benac noted that Torabi's guitar and arrangement skills added a psychedelic edge to the band's sound.

Torabi got a call in 2005 from Dave Smith or Daniel O'Sullivan of the band Guapo, when the band were on Ipecac, that they wanted him as their guitarist. Torabi said that the mid-2000s were "very much a time when bands like Fantomas, Melvins, Sunn O))), Neurosis, seemed to really be happening and Guapo were like, maybe a tier down, so we were always busy." Torabi also played with the North Sea Radio Orchestra, a contemporary chamber music group formed in 2002 by Craig and Sharron Fortnam. He provided accompanying vocals with the North Sea Chorus, and was with them circa 2006.

=== 2007–2008: Cardiacs studio work until activies ceased ===
Torabi met the snooker player Steve Davis when the two were watching the band Magma in France, with Torabi inviting Davis to watch him play as the lead guitarist with Cardiacs at the Astoria. Torabi featured on Cardiacs' 2007 single, "Ditzy Scene", co-written by Smith and Torabi, Torabi having written the words. The single was recorded as part of Org Records' Org-An-Ised single series as a teaser for the album LSD. Benac called the title track "a lurching psychedelic beast", crediting Torabi's influence with pushing Smith to more psychedelic sounds, even after the success of The Special Garage Concerts. Torabi was a member of Cardiacs, which had a lineup of Tim and Jim Smith, Torabi, Leith, Melanie Woods and Cathy Harabaras, when the band stopped their activities in 2008 as Tim Smith was forced to retire from the scene due to neurological problems that caused him difficulty with speech, movement and muscle spasms which arose following a cardiac arrest. LSD, which was due to be released in October 2008, was put on hold and "Ditzy Scene" remained Torabi's only released Cardiacs studio work.

=== 2009–2011: starting Knifeworld and Believers Roast, Tim Smith fundraising efforts, playing in Chrome Hoof and the Mediæval Bæbes ===
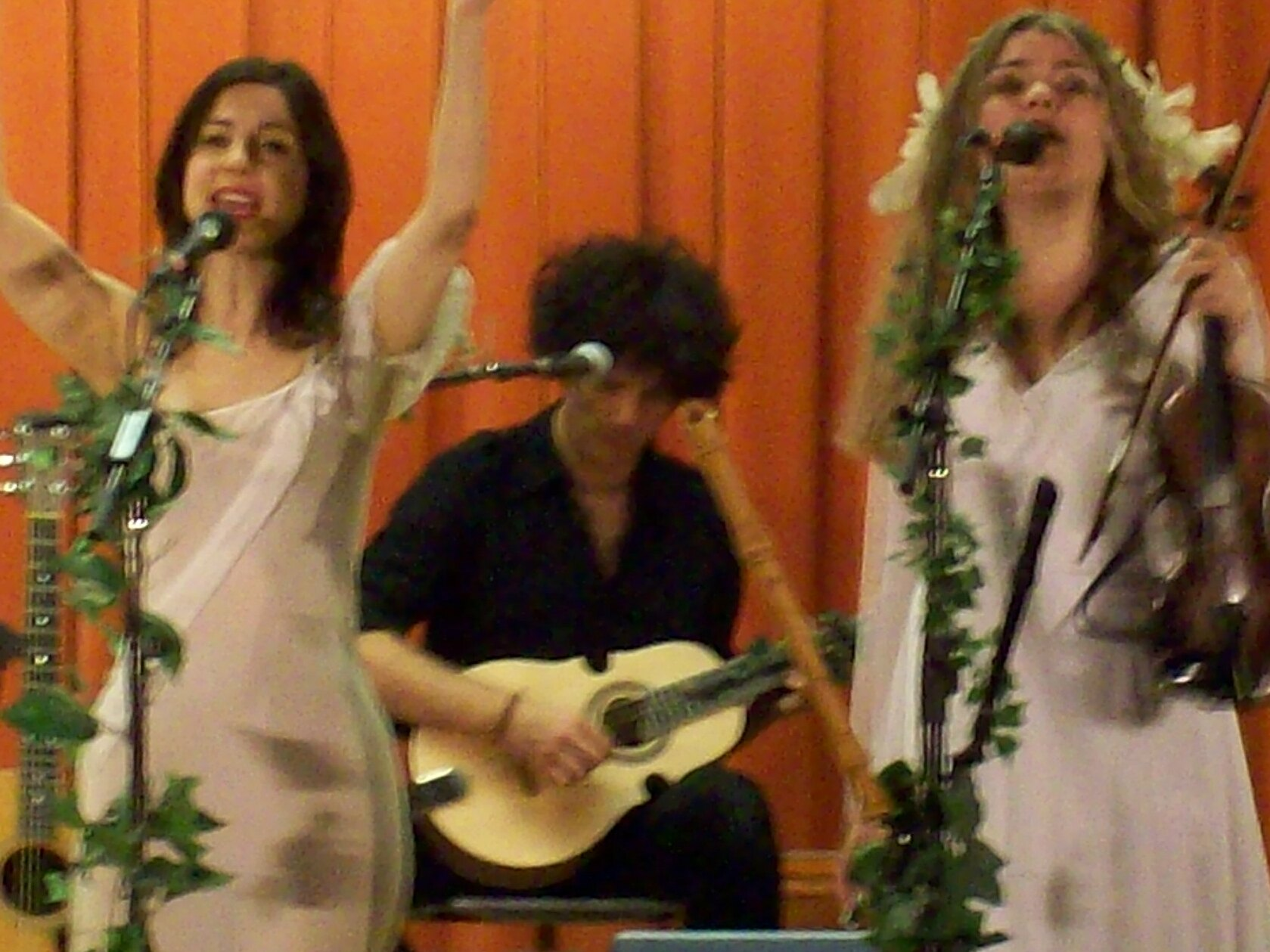
Torabi (middle) performing with the Mediæval Bæbes in 2008

Knifeworld originated from around the time of the Monsoon Bassoon's breakup, but only released its first material eight years later, following a long recording period. Originally a solo project, it has since become a full band. Torabi is a former member of Chrome Hoof; he needed a band to play his Knifeword material at the brief time he was playing with Chrome Hoof, so Torabi enlisted the keyboard player Emmet Elvin and Chloe Herington. Knifeworld was Torabi's main compositional vehicle, in many ways continuing ideas and approaches to polyrhythmic songwriting and arrangements that were germinated in the Monsoon Bassoon. Joe Banks of Prog said that Knifeworld "in many ways [...] carried forward the torch of this particular ['challenging, gloriously melodic but often fearsomely complex'] type of music" since Cardiacs were forced into an indefinite hiatus. Louder Than War's Mike Ainscoe called Knifeworld "unique and genre bending", with Torabi the "mastermind" behind the band. As of 2009, Torabi also played guitar and cuatro in the Mediæval Bæbes.

Torabi started the label Believers Roast in 2009, initially as a platform to release his own music, however since the release of 2010's The Leader Of The Starry Skies it has released music Torabi feels particularly strongly about, including The Gasman, Thumpermonkey and Redbus Noface.

Torabi played guitar of the 2010 Chrome Hoof album Crush Depth. In a review by The Quietus, John Doran said Torabi got to "head bang the fuck out on 'Third Sun Descendant' [referred to as 'Third Rock Descendents' at this point in the article], a track heavier than 100 tons of blue whale blubber." In August 2010, Torabi broke the news that Cardiacs would never play live again in a podcast interview for the website The Epileptic Gibbon. After his close friend Smith became ill, Torabi was one of the organisers of a benefit concert which was due to take place at the Queen Elizabeth Hall in London, however the idea was scrapped when it proved impossible to co-ordinate the many artists who wanted to be involved. In 2011, Torabi said that a future concert had not been ruled out. He was also among those who helped assemble the musicians for Leader of the Starry Skies, a collection of cover version recordings of Smith's songs, and said that a further volume could be released to supplement the album, subtitled Songbook 1, at a future date. The album was fully released on his label Believers Roast and included a folk-tinged take on "The Stench of Honey" supplied by his band Knifeworld. Knifeworld released the EP Dear Lord, No Deal in July 2011.

=== 2013–2014: meeting Daevid Allen and joining Gong for I See You ===
Torabi had been a fan of progressive rock giants Gong since his teens, and the band's outsider, countercultural stance was hugely important to him. Professional snooker player Steve Davis, also a long term Gong fan, introduced Torabi and Daevid Allen, after the two had already briefly met a couple times, when he brought them together for The Interesting Alternative Show which Torabi co-presented with Davis. Allen reported that he had an "instant flash of recognition" that he had met a future member of Gong and that he and Torabi were immediately intimate good friends. In 2013, when playing with Marshall Allen in London, Daevid Allen asked Torabi if he would like to play guitar in Gong. Torabi told Allen that he couldn't play like Steve Hillage, and Allen responded that he wasn't interested in what Torabi couldn't do, but in what he could. Allen recruited Torabi as an additional guitarist in 2014, despite having never heard him play. The first jam they had was in a rehearsal place in New Cross.

The 2014 Knifeworld album The Unravelling was Torabi's love letter to Tim Smith, and an attempt to come to terms with Smith's situation since 2008. Then 42, Torabi looks his past in the eye on the eight-minute "Don't Land on Me", and yearns to inhabit the universe of a person he holds dear but can't quite reach on "I'm Hiding Behind My Eyes".

With Gong, Torabi debuted on the 2014 album I See You, where he joined founders Allen and Gilli Smyth along with their son Orlando on drums, Ian East on saxophone, Dave Sturt on bass, and Fabio Golfetti on guitar. After Torabi joined Gong, Charlie Cawood took over as the multi-instrumentalist in Mediæval Bæbes, a role Torabi asked if Cawood was interested in, knowing Cawood played saz, oud and non-Western instruments. On joining Gong, Torabi said he "didn’t feel too overwhelmed" as he had already played in Cardiacs, which was his favourite band of all time. After some Brazilian gigs in early 2014, while the band were completing I See You, cancer was spotted in Allen. Gong had a 42-date tour booked to promote I See You, and once promoted, heard that Allen was unable to appear on the tour and would not be performing, meaning most of the gigs were pulled. Gong agreed to honour the remaining dates, and Torabi said that he would be happy to sing, though he remembered "I was pretty reluctant – partly because one of the reasons I joined was to be in a band with Daevid. I didn’t have 100% confidence it would work."

=== 2015–2016: continuing with Gong as frontman, Rejoice! I'm Dead! ===
Before Allen died of cancer in March 2015, he left Torabi in charge of the band, expressing his wish that they continue with the new recruit as frontman. Allen's farewell message email read "it is super clear to me that Kavus, you are the perfect fit with Dave, Ian and Fabio and that Cheb, you are the perfect fit with Kavus!". Torabi didn't see a future for the group beyond the tour until the band started rehearsing, which he said "completely put to sleep" any fears of Gong becoming "some sort of tribute act" once they played. Torabi "never expected or particularly desired to front Gong" but thought the band sounded "so good" that it would have been "stupid not to continue". He was also happy that the latest incarnation was not like any previous version of the band, stating it was "exactly what Daevid wanted". Torabi and Gong carried on with Allen's blessing. In April, Torabi, East and Sturt appeared as Inspiral Gong at a concert to remember Allen. In May, Gong featuring Torabi as frontman along with East, Sturt, Golfetti and Cheb Nettles confirmed a five-date UK tour for October entitled You Can't Kill Me, which Torabi admitted he had not been certain about. Torabi dispelled uncertainty about Gong's ongoing prosperity in an interview with Prog magazine. He called the continuation of Gong "kind of a brand new band, but with this blueprint to draw from and create stuff in the style of".

In a review for Rejoice! I'm Dead! (2016), Ian Fortnam of Prog said Torabi's vocal style as the 'new' Daevid Allen echoed the Canterbury stylings of Caravan member Pye Hastings, calling it perfect for the exemplary material on Rejoice! I'm Dead!, but also not "exactly robust". Jordan Blum of PopMatters opined that the album "proved that Gong could carry on exceedingly well as a brilliantly revitalized but respectfully familiar unit under Torabi’s watch." On Torabi being in charge, reviewer Oregano Rathbone of Record Collector thought it "hard to countenance a more apposite tribute to Allen’s antic spirit."

=== 2017–2019: forming and releasing first music from the Utopa Strong, The Universe Also Collapses by Gong, and playing with Steve Hillage ===
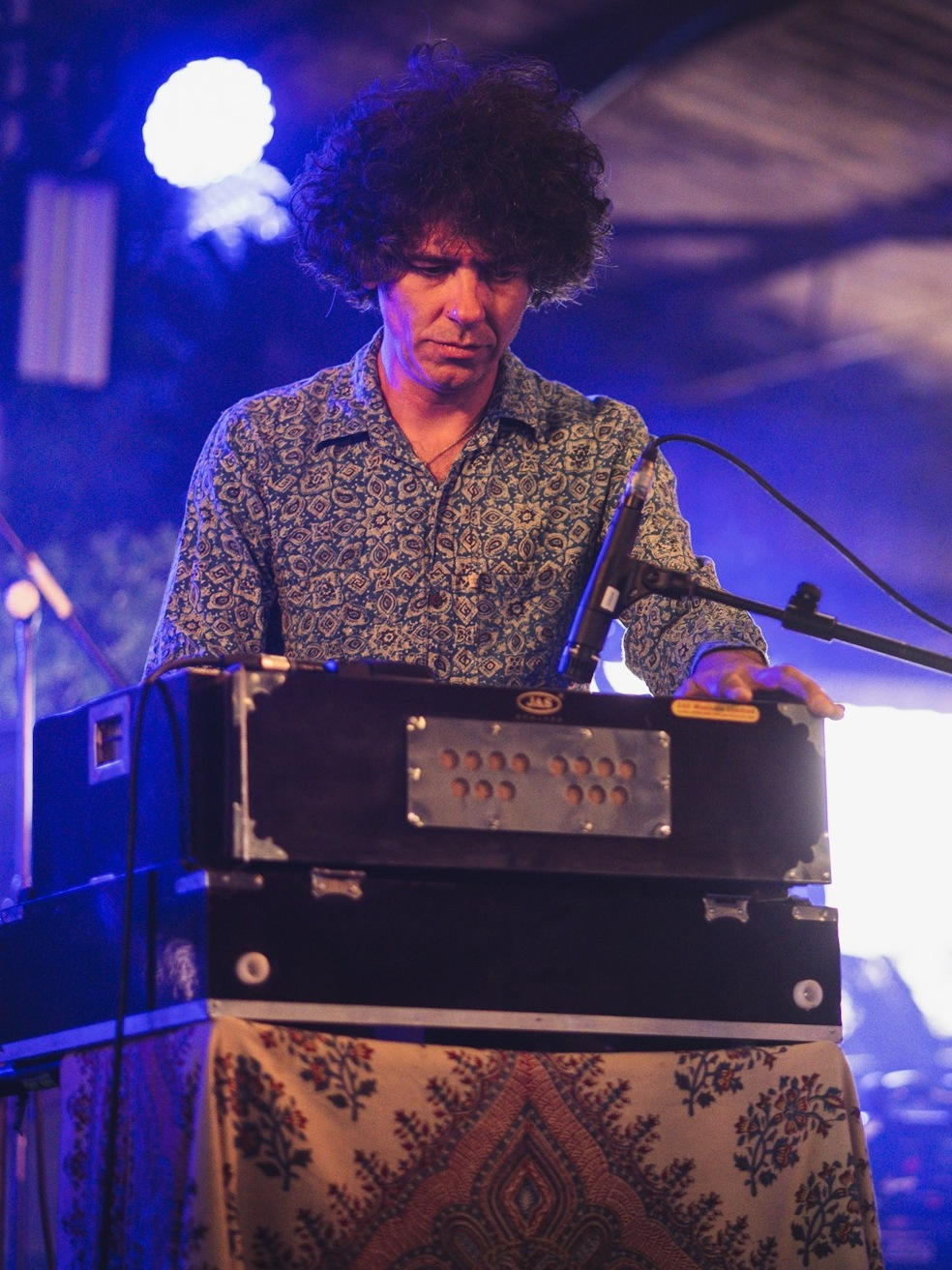
Torabi with the Utopia Strong in 2019

In 2017, a double-header show at The Lexington in London had Torabi perform with both bands, as a full-time member of Guapo and a cameo appearance for the encore of Spratleys Japs, an outfit originally helmed by Smith, for a cover of the Cardiacs song "Flap Off You Beak". Steve Davis had taken up modular synth in 2016. After DJing at the 2017 Glastonbury Festival, Davis and Torabi met and bonded with multi-instrumentalist Michael J. York of Coil and the three decided to form a band. An experimental project, the Utopia Strong originated from an experimental improvised session in Glastonbury on the evening of 2 January 2018, where they left a recorder running through their 13-hour session. Torabi is the frontman of the group. The Utopia Strong’s debut gig was a modular synthesiser trade show, and the band have supported Steve Hillage and Magma on tour. They have been described as a supergroup.

In 2018, Torabi released his first solo work, the three track EP Solar Divination, on Believers Roast. Ainscoe called the EP "a genuinely innovative talent benefitting from the freedom of working solo and giving head to his personal visions" and "an inventive and innovative teaser" for a full album.

Torabi was a guitarist in the 2019 band that Steve Hillage put together to revisit Hillage's post-Gong 1970s and '80s solo work. In May 2019, Gong released their second post-Daevid Allen album, The Universe Also Collapses, which Torabi called "the ultimate psychedelic rock album". The band marked the album's announcement by releasing a radio edit of their track "The Elemental" and announcing a run of UK tour dates. Blum said that the album's arrangements "fuse the deep-rooted penchants of Allen with the thoughtful peculiarities of Torabi". The Utopia Strong released the ten-minute long track "Brainsurgeons 3" in June 2019 and their self-titled debut album on 13 September 2019 on Rocket Recordings, which features a guest vocal appearance by Mediæval Bæbes' Katharine Blake.

=== 2020–2022: solo album Hip to the Jag and Pulsing Signals by Gong ===
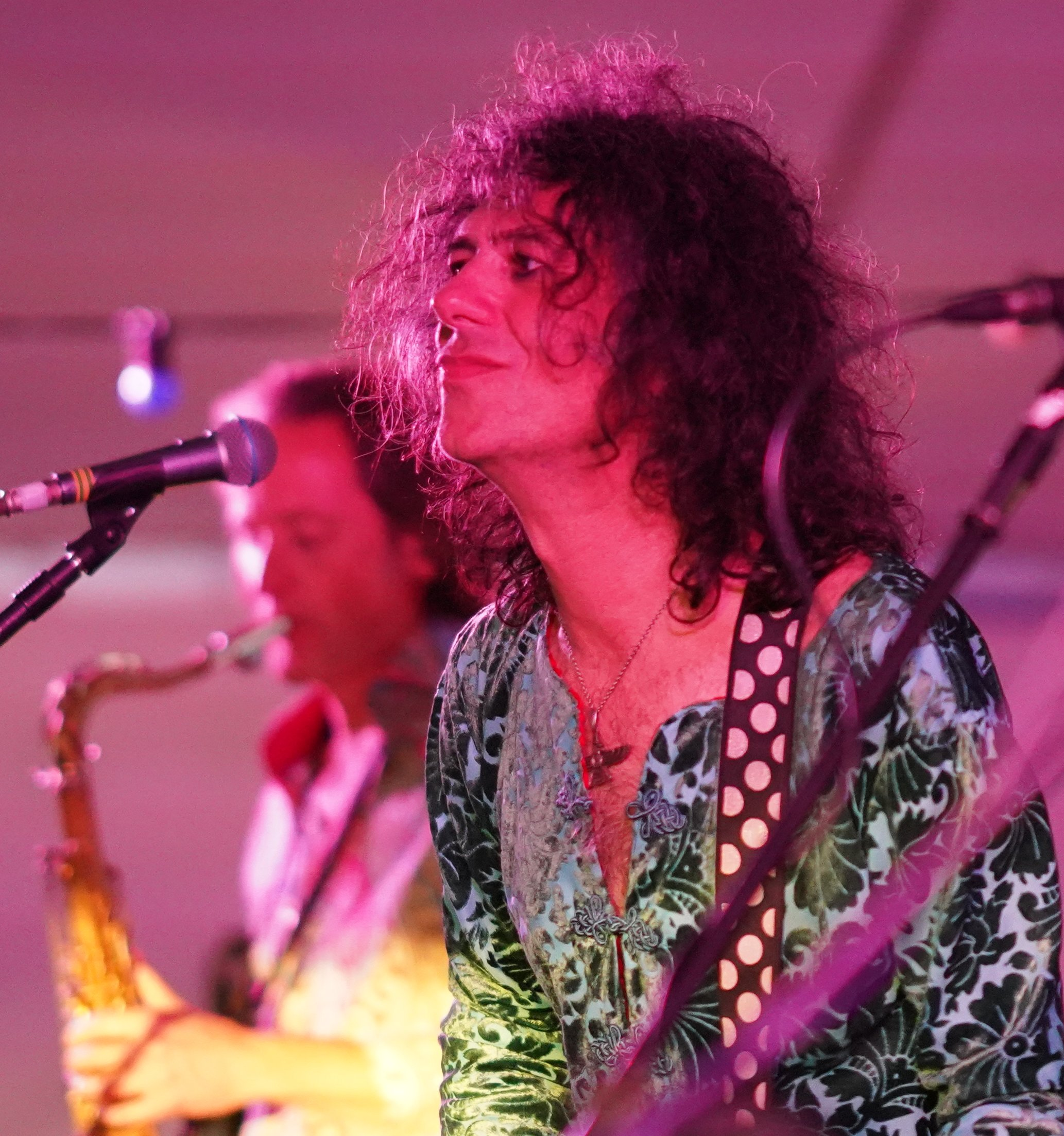
Torabi with Gong in 2022

In 2020, Torabi released the psychedelic debut solo album Hip to the Jag, which Banks called "a meditation on – and sometimes confrontation with – unseen worlds and the realm beyond the senses" which, like The Universe Also Collapses, "reconfigures psychedelia for the modern age". Banks suggested that some of the album's songs were originally intended for a Knifeworld album, and that the decision the album's material on his own was due to logistical problems with the eight-member band. The acquisition of an Indian harmonium, an instrument which produces a shimmering drone like a sitar, strongly influenced the direction of Torabi's songwriting.

Torabi and Davis of the Utopia Strong were both frustrated that their gigging was cut short due to lockdown. After the long term health difficulties of bandmate Tim Smith of Cardiacs, who was semi-paralysed for many years and a significant male influence on Torabi, Torabi confirmed the news of Smith's death on 21 July 2020 to The Guardian and was among the musicians who paid tribute to Smith on social media.

In 2021, Torabi said that the arrival of lockdown scuppered plans for a new Gong album. Without new work incoming, Sturt revisited multitrack recordings of three Gong shows from their The Universe Also Collapses tour in Newcastle, Nottingham and Leeds and selected the best performances for the live album Pulsing Signals, which released in February 2022. Gong's 2022 joint tour with Ozric Tentacles was the first full-band outing for Ozric Tentacles in eight years and the first time both bands had toured together. Torabi said "As mind-blowing as [the tour] may have been for the audience, it was as beautiful for both bands off stage."

=== 2023–2024: Heaven's Sun with Richard Wileman, Unending Ascending by Gong and touring with Miranda Sex Garden ===
For the studio album Heaven's Sun, released through Believers Roast on 2 June 2023, Torabi collaborated with Karda Estra's Richard Wileman. The album features the two tracks "Particles of Light" and "Derelict Creations", and contributions from Amy Fry (clarinet & vocals), Caron Hansford (oboe) and Mike Ostime (trumpet).

Gong's third studio album since Allen's death, Unending Ascending (2023), thematically continued from its predecessor. On the album, Torabi sings about third eyes and Ishtar, the Mesopotamian goddess of sexual love. Torabi said that Unending Ascending was the second of a loose trilogy of albums, joined by the three key themes of the universe, the moon, and water. On the premier of the single "Tiny Galaxies", Torabi said the song "came together very quickly and we loved it so much, we road tested it around the UK and Europe throughout the summer of last year before we recorded it". Banks said that the track "All Clocks Reset" featured the ghosts of Torabi's other bands, specifically Knifeworld and Cardiacs, due to its "spiky Fripp-style riffing" and "precise, pointillist horns dancing in formation". Louder Than War's Nathan Brown noted the song's "time signature jumps and about turns you’d expect from the likes of the Cardiacs".

In the line-up of the reformed darkwave sextet Miranda Sex Garden, which announced a run of live dates in July 2023 for September and October, Torabi replaced founding member and guitarist Ben Golomstock who died in 2018. The band is fronted by Katharine Blake the Mediæval Bæbes. In April 2024, the band announced a run of live dates for May which included their first overseas shows since 2000, and shared a video for the single "Velventine", a two track EP featuring the guitars of Golomstock and Torabi. In May 2024, reviewing the band at the Wave-Gotik-Treffen festival in Leipzig, Germany, Louder Than War's Michael Nottingham noted the "wailing waves" of Torabi's guitar during the track "Broken Glass" from Carnival Of Souls (2003). The same month, Torabi made a guest appearance with Cardiacs Family, a reunited incarnation of Cardiacs, for one of the Sing to Tim events of 2024.

=== 2025–present: release of LSD and live dates from Cardiacs, Bright Spirit by Gong ===
Torabi added extra guitar to the Wildhearts' 2025 album Satanic Rites of the Wildhearts as a guest on the album with Gong's Cheb Nettles playing drums. The iteration of the band's lineup for the album included Jon Poole as the bassist. Ginger Wildheart said that Torabi and Poole "were just like putting two foul-mouthed Furbies together." In May 2025, Jim Smith and Torabi provided an update on the long-awaited Cardiacs studio album LSD to Prog that it would release that year, revealing that the surviving band members and additional musicians had been working under their aegis to finish the album. The pair were joined on the record by former Oceansize and Empire State Bastard musician Mike Vennart (vocals), as well as Rose-Ellen Kemp (vocals), Leith (vocals, drums), and the late Tim Smith, with Craig Fortnam of North Sea Radio Orchestra composing brass and string arrangements. Until Tim Smith's death in 2020, he had been able to oversee and approve the creative ideas of LSD by pointing at an alphabet board to communicate with Jim and Torabi. LSD released on 19 September. All of the album's 17 tracks were written by Tim Smith with arrangements throughout provided by Torabi. In a review, Sean Kitching of The Quietus said that LSD occupied a special place in Cardiacs' back catalogue as the only album with Torabi, who provided "his own distinctive psychedelic riffing via some of his finest guitar work to date", including "serious guitar soloing" on the first single "Woodeneye". Jim Smith shared his desire to tour the album with a new lineup including Torabi and Vennart, and later in September, Cardiacs announced three live dates on the back of LSD for March 2026.

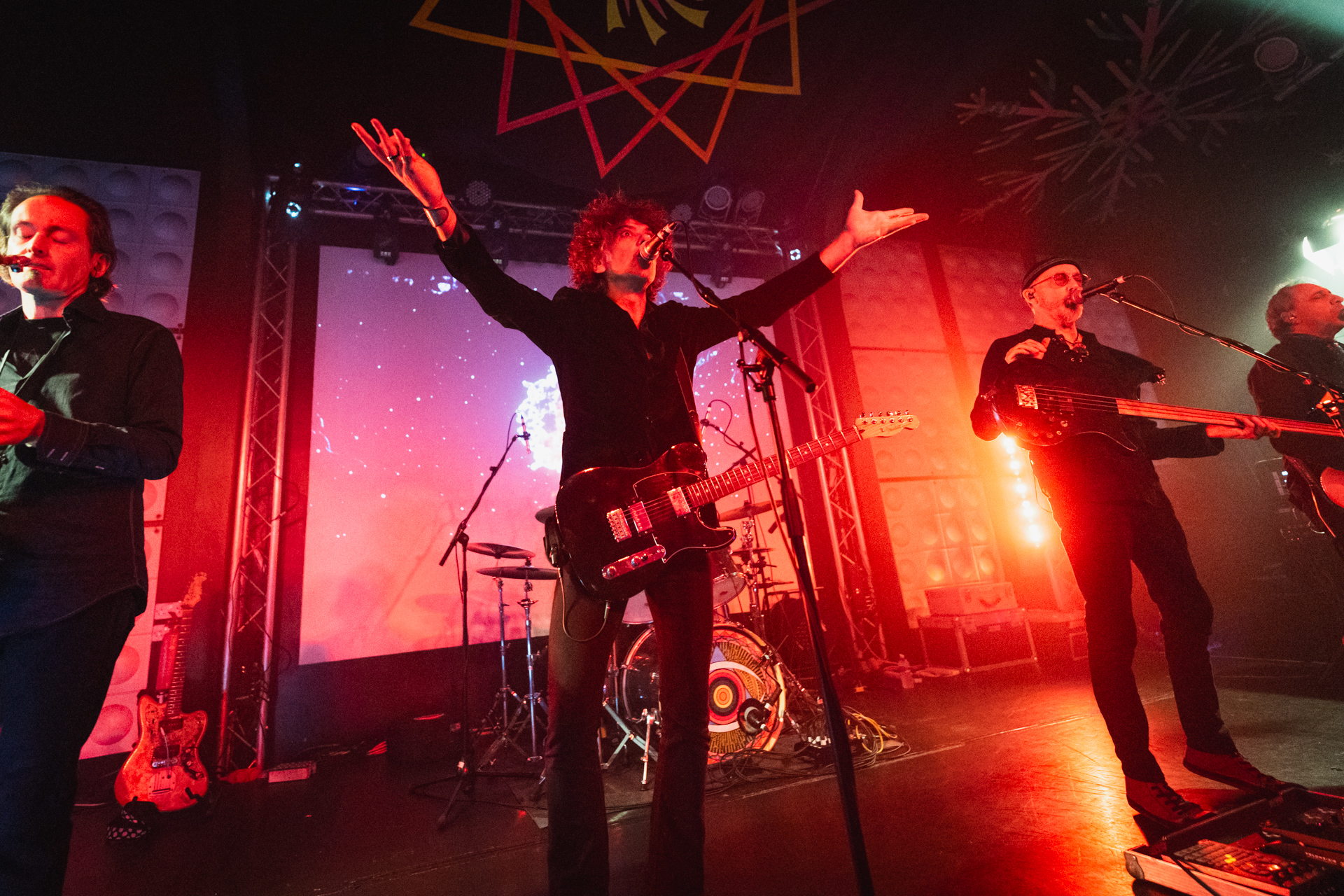
Torabi (arms raised) with Gong in 2025

Due to commitments with Gong and no longer living in London, in Torabi was replaced by Jimmy Martin as guitarist in Miranda Sex Garden. In an article with Prog published on 3 November 2025, Torabi said that Gong were "now starting to make plans for what the third album" of their loose trilogy "will be like". On 5 November, Gong released the single "Stars in Heaven", announced live dates for March 2026, and teased the release of their album for 2026, sharing the title, Bright Spirit. Talking about picking the first song to be released, Torabi said "it has felt as if there’s an extra weight on the choice, as if the song somehow has to represent the whole album", which he called "the most colourful and kaleidoscopic album so far from this incarnation of the band." The single "The Wonderment" released with a video on 6 January 2026, which Torabi exclaimed was on the birthday of Alan Watts and Syd Barrett. Torabi said that Bright Spirit was about "the Earth goddess and the divine feminine." Prog reported in November that Torabi had endured a breakdown while Gong were making the album due to the pressure of constant touring, and got increasingly worked up while trying to finish the lyrics, telling the band that he could not get the album done by the deadline. Sturt recalled when the band were writing the songs in a rehearsal studio in March being "a very, very difficult time".

=== Collaborations with Steve Davis (The Interesting Alternative Show, the Utopia Strong, DJ work) ===
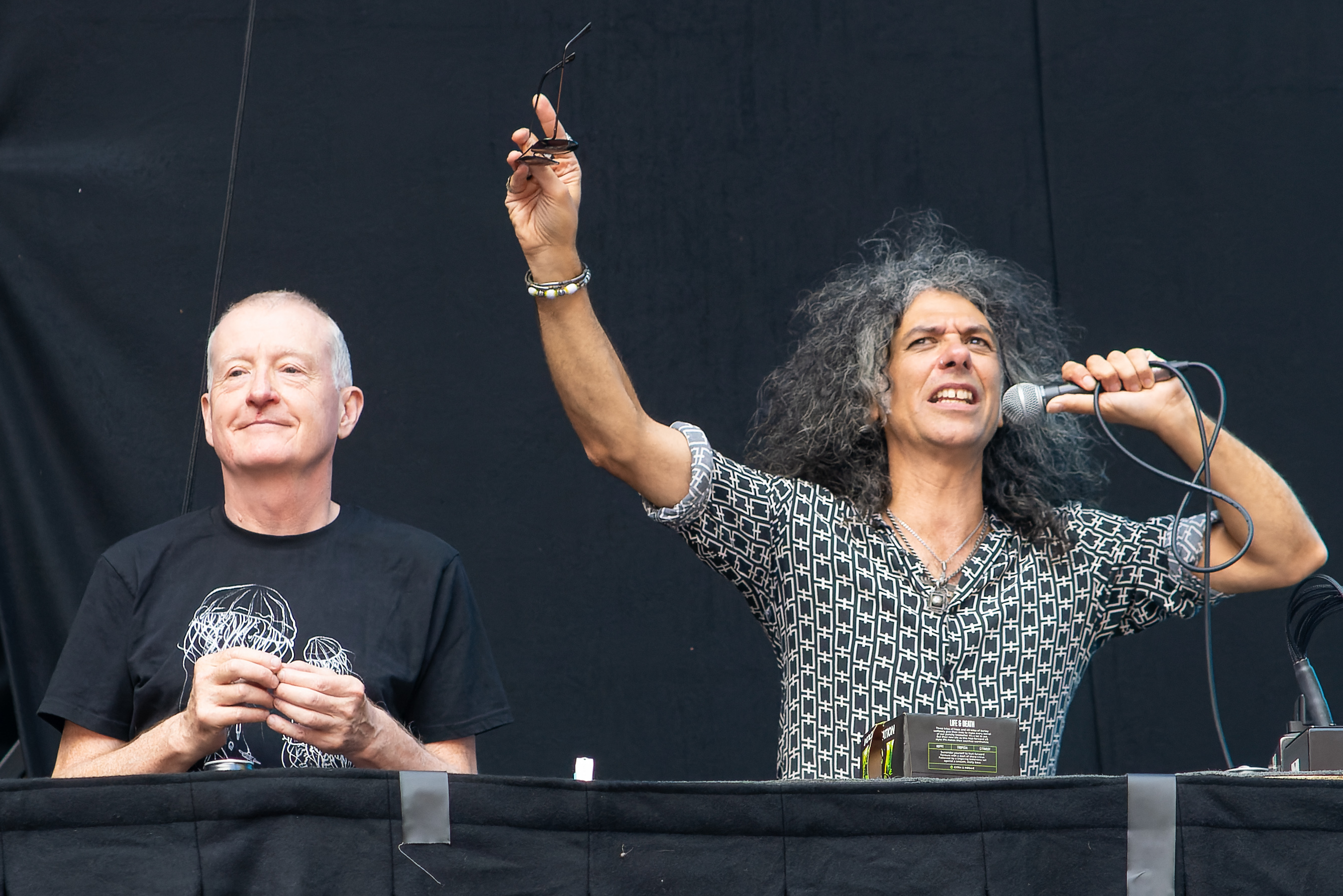
Steve Davis and Torabi (right) supporting Blur at Wembley Stadium in 2023

Between 2010 and 2018 Torabi co-presented "The Interesting Alternative Show" with Davis on Brentwood radio station Phoenix FM. The show focussed largely on experimental, avant-progressive, psychedelic, electronic, folk and rock music with an emphasis on new releases. Guests included Daevid Allen, Chris Cutler, Charles Hayward, Bob Drake,The Fierce and the Dead, Sanguine Hum and Stars in Battledress. During, and subsequent to, the broadcast of The Interesting Alternative Show, Torabi and Davis worked together presenting live public DJ sets, including an appearance at the 2016 Glastonbury Festival. On 9 July 2023, Davis and Torabi DJ'd opening for Blur at Wembley Stadium.

Torabi and Davis subsequently formed an electronic music band called the Utopia Strong in which Torabi plays guitar and harmonium, Davis plays modular analog synthesizer and Coil associate/Holy Family member Michael J. York plays pipes, drones, synthesizers and electronics. Their first album The Utopia Strong was released on 13 September 2019 and has been followed by a series of live recordings available as digital downloads and limited edition vinyl issues. In April 2021 they released the double autobiography Medical Grade Music. The book was listed in Louder Than War's 21 Best Music Books of 2021. Ainscoe called Torabi and Davis's association "bizarre but unsurprising", with Davis himself being "an aficionado of the psychedelically challenging".

== Artistry ==
I always love the term 'psychedelic'. It has a few negative connotations, depending on how you happen upon the word in the first place, but in the main I'm very happy to be described as that. I think the mis-conception with the word 'psychedelic' in music is that it pertains to a particular era, ie: the late sixties. That's not the case, Steve Reich is psychedelic music, as is Devin Townsend, Shudder to Think, Debussy, My Bloody Valentine, Don Caballero, White Noise, Autechre, Magma, The Necks etc. I like it because it seems to describe more how the music makes you feel than a particular sound or style. There's that horrible term "pronk", which is supposed to be a cross between prog and punk, which I loathe. I don't go in for descriptions anyway. Thinking of music in terms of genre is so reductive.

— Kavus Torabi on classifying his music

Torabi admitted to Prog writer Jo Kendall in 2014 that, "within the overstuffed suitcase of ideas inside his creative noggin, when it comes to songwriting he's searching for the perfect pop song", his propellant having been a time in pop music when "anything was possible – the twang of spiky new wave, the intoxication of psychedelia and the pimply teenage war cry of Iron Maiden." In 2016, Chris Roberts of The Quietus called Torabi "a major fan of, and contributor to, British progressive and psychedelic music over the past decade or so". Torabi has been described as a "psychedelic polymath", or a "left-field polymath", a "ravenous musical polyglot", “the modern prog iconoclast”, and a "self-confessed control freak". In 2024, Torabi was called "a disciplined and radical figure who methodically works at his music, writing and visual art" by Jonathan Wright of The Quietus. Prog's Joe Banks said "Just as Steven Wilson has become the majordomo of all things nu prog, so Torabi has come to occupy a similar position in a tight-knit, post-Cardiacs world where the music is playful but challenging, gloriously melodic but often fearsomely complex." Emma Johnston of Classic Rock called Torabi a "prog hero".

Torabi is reluctant to be pegged as a particular stylist, and his music has always drawn on a wide variety of influences. These have included indie and alternative rock (Pixies, Shudder to Think, XTC), British and American art/progressive rock (Cardiacs, Henry Cow, Yes, Hatfield and the North, Don Caballero), folk music, minimalist music, various forms of hard rock and heavy metal (Voivod, Melvins) and many others. His compositions are often typically dense, polyrhythmic and based in the Lydian mode.

== Public image ==
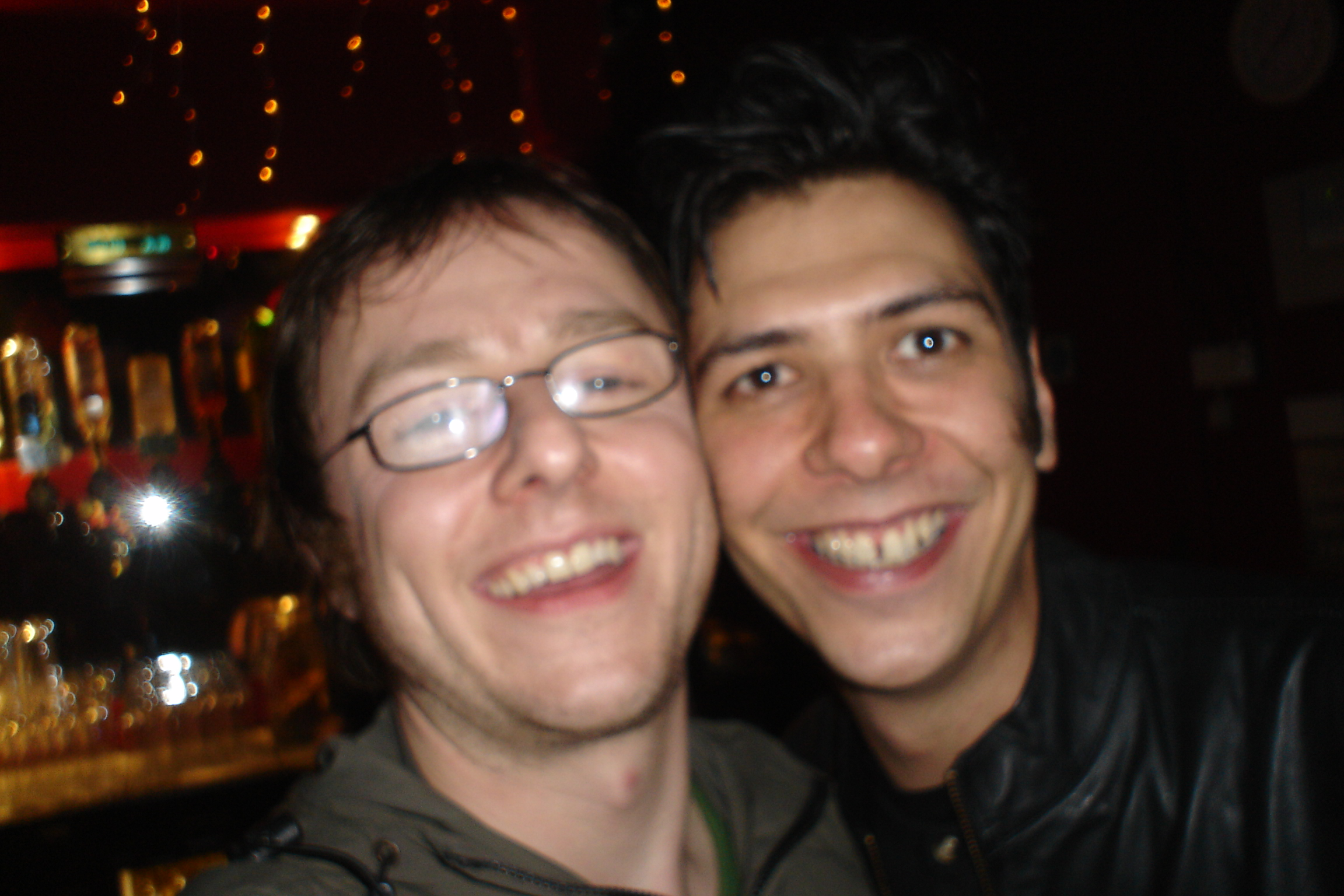
Torabi with a Cardiacs fan in 2005, sporting his "Cheshire cat grin"

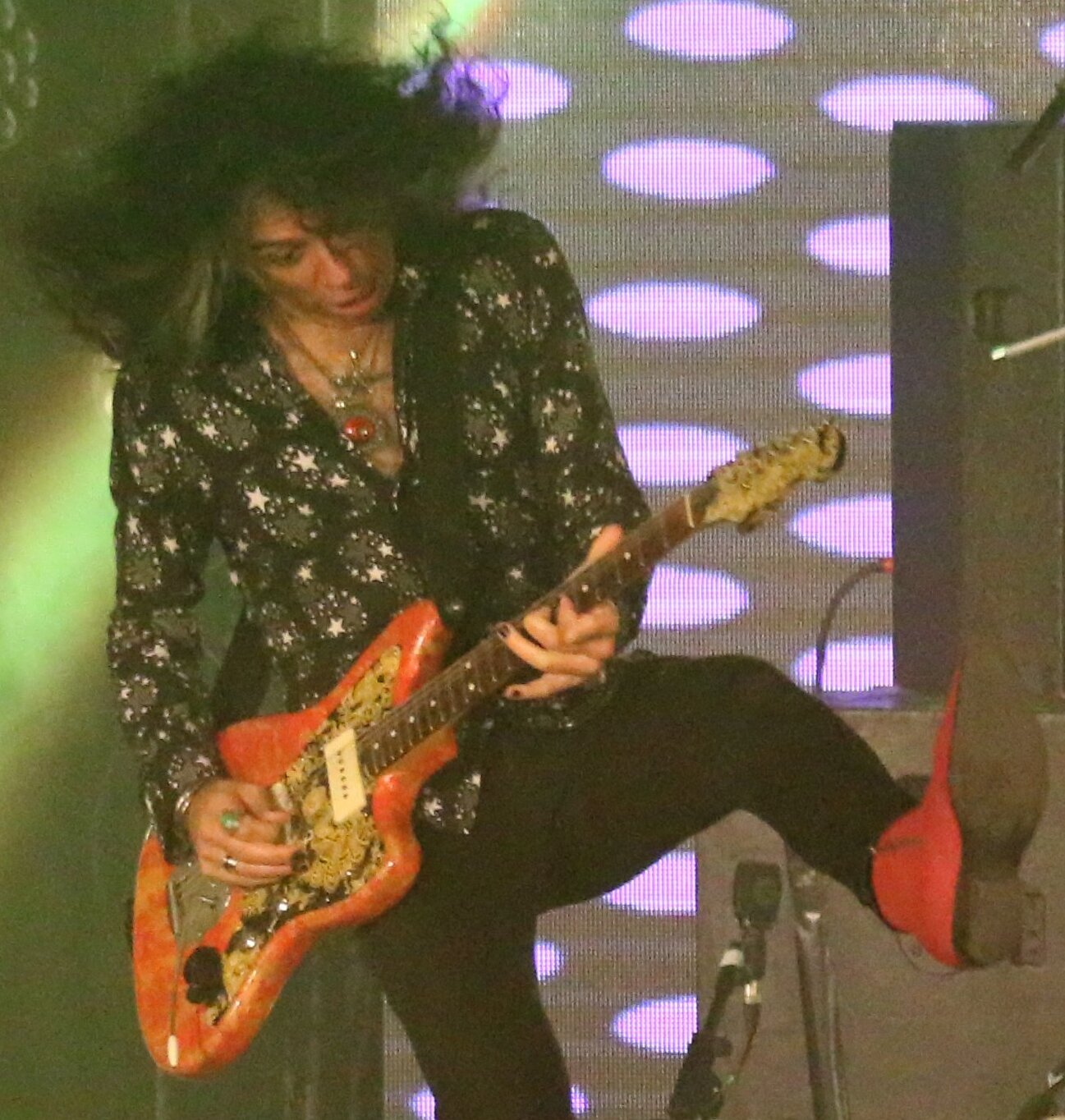
Torabi with curly hair, nail varnish and red winkle-pickers in a 2023 Gong performance

In 2011, Evans described Torabi as having been the visual focus of the Monsoon Bassoon, "unfeasibly tall and wiry, with a big ol' mop of omni-directionally wayward hair, resembling Buzz Osbourne reincarnated as a young spruce tree." NME had described Torabi and Chudley as "looking like missing Bad Seeds". In a 2014 biography on Knifeworld, Emma Johnston of Prog called Torabi "an enormously gregarious character with a Cheshire cat grin and a mop of hair that seems to have a life of its own". Ainscoe said that Torabi conjured up images of Syd Barrett with his "unruly hair" and "occasionally wild eyes". Describing a chat with Torabi through Zoom in 2021, Miranda Sawyer of The Guardian noted: "his curly-haired head looms out of a starry universe background. Things aren’t much less cosmic when he manages to get rid of it and reveals himself to be sitting in a book-and-CD-lined sitting room with walls painted like a lilac sky."

Sawyer compared Torabi's appearance to Steve Davis' suburban, straight-laced, undemonstrative one: Torabi wore a sage-green embroidered kurta with wild curly hair whilst Davis wore a T-shirt and black tracky bottoms, with a short grey crop. In the interview, Davis commented "As a result of being around Kavus, I'm very aware that I’m no longer allowed to wear any type of blue jeans. I'm wearing black chinos instead. As yet I've struggled to get into pointed boots. I find they're uncomfortable on the ankle."

In 2024, Wright commented that Torabi came across "like a bit of a hippy" and "a kind of grounded psychedelic trickster" while interviewing him, and that the way Torabi dresses—with tousled hair, nail varnish and a fondness for primary colours—is influenced by his ideas of finding magic in everyday experience. Torabi said "I thought, once I started dressing up like this, that it makes life more fun. I was wanting to be that guy, so why not be that guy? It's ludicrous, swanning around in the pub wearing red winkle-pickers and stupid hair. People look at you and think, 'Who's this wanker?' But I don't care. We're all who we pretend to be anyways, it's only a flesh avatar, you know?"

== Personal life ==
Torabi married Dawn Staple in 2003 and their daughter, Sima, was born in October 2009. The family lived in a basement flat in Hackney during the Covid pandemic and lockdown, which Torabi has called "a very, very difficult time for all three of us". A deterioration in Torabi’s mental health saw him become estranged from his family and leave the family home. He admitted "my relationship with my wife and daughter just seemed to deteriorate during lockdown. And try as we might, we couldn’t really get it back on track. After lockdown I went on a one-month tour with Gong, and when I came home afterwards it was clear they just didn’t want me back. I think I’d become unbearable to live with." By then in his fifties, Torabi soon realised that after thirty years living in London he could no longer afford to live there alone and still have enough space for his collection of musical instruments, so took up an offer from his Utopia Strong bandmate Michael J York to move to the Somerset Levels to be York's lodger. As of 2024, Torabi is based in Glastonbury. Torabi reflected on the challenges in his personal life in the writing of his second solo album The Banishing (2024).

As of 2021, Torabi had a dog called Teddy, who made a brief appearance in a video Torabi created in the 2020 lockdown for the song "Cemetery Of Light".

As a musician of Iranian origin, Torabi recorded videos in 2026 supporting protesters against the Iranian regime, which he called "corrupt and murderous".

== Discography ==
=== Solo ===
Albums

- Hip to the Jag (2020)
- The Banishing (2024)
- October by Name (2026)

Collaborative albums

- Heaven's Sun (2023, with Richard Wileman)

Extended plays

- Solar Divination (2018)

Collaborative EPs

- An EP of Acoustic Iron Maiden Covers (2020, with Rob Crow and Mike Vennart)

Singles

- "Cemetery Of Light" (2020, Hip to the Jag)
- "The Sentinel" (2020, Hip to the Jag outtake)
- "Snake Humanis" (2024, The Banishing)
- "Heart the Same" (2024, The Banishing)
- "Water into Wine" (2026, October by Name)
- "My Shameful Namesake" (2026, October by Name)

=== As member ===
With Cardiacs

- The Special Garage Concerts (live, 2005)
- "Ditzy Scene" (single, 2007)
- Some Fairytales from the Rotten Shed (2017 DVD)
- "Vermin Mangle" (single, 2020)
- "Woodeneye" (single, 2025)
- "Downup" (single, 2025)
- "Volob" (single, 2025)
- LSD (2025)

With North Sea Radio Orchestra

- North Sea Radio Orchestra (2006)
- Birds (2008)

With Chrome Hoof

- Crush Depth (2010)

With Guapo

- History of the Visitation (2013)
- Obscure Knowledge (2015)

With Gong

- I See You (2014)
- "The Thing That Should Be" (single, 2016)
- Rejoice! I'm Dead! (2016)
- "The Elemental" (single, 2019)
- "My Sawtooth Wake" (single, 2019)
- The Universe Also Collapses (2019)
- "My Sawtooth Wake" (live, single, 2021)
- Pulsing Signals (live, 2022)
- "Tiny Galaxies" (single, 2023)
- "All Clocks Reset" (single, 2023)
- Unending Ascending (2023)
- "Stars in Heaven" (single, 2025)
- "The Wonderment" (single, 2026)
- Bright Spirit (2026)

With Miranda Sex Garden

- "Velventine" (single, 2024)

=== Other credits ===
Title	Year	Artist	Notes
Guns	1999	Cardiacs	Guitar and stage technician
Temptation	2010	Mediæval Bæbes	Electric and acoustic guitars, cuatro, bass guitar and additional vocals
New Worlds	2011	Karda Estra	Featuring two songs co-written and performed by Torabi
Bob's Drive In	2011	Bob Drake	Guitar and backing vocals
The Huntress	2012	Mediæval Bæbes	Electric and acoustic guitars, cuatro, bass guitar and additional vocals; co-wrote one piece
Mondo Profondo	2013	Karda Estra	Guitar Mondo Profondo II
Strange Relations	2015	Karda Estra	Guitar and co-writing
Dreams and Absurdities	2015	Dave Sturt	
Silent Reflux	2021	Chloe Herington	
Satanic Rites of the Wildhearts	2025	The Wildhearts	
