= Pre-Emptive False Rapture =

Studio album by Chrome Hoof
- Released: 23 July 2007
- Recorded: Early 2007 at Southern Studios by Harvey Birrell
- Genres: Experimental Rock, Progressive Metal
- Length: 48:19
- Label: Southern Records
- Producers: Chrome Hoof and Harvey Birrell

Chrome Hoof chronology
Beyond Zade (2006)	Pre-Emptive False Rapture (2007)	Crush Depth (2010)

Pre-Emptive False Rapture is a full-length album from the British experimental rock band Chrome Hoof. It was released in 2007 on Southern Records.

== Reception ==
In its review of the album, The Daily Telegraph said, "It's hard not to miss the performance with a band this theatrical but Chrome Hoof's first record tightens up their boggling musical wig-outs while keeping the essential essence of insanity."

== Track listing ==
- All Songs Written By Chrome Hoof.
1. "Nordic Curse" – 1:56
2. "Tonyte" – 5:30
3. "Pronoid" – 3:48
4. "Circus 9000" – 4:40
5. "Moss Covered Obelisk" – 9:02
6. "Leave This Ruined Husk" – 3:45
7. "Symbolik 180°" – 2:46
8. "Death is Certain" – 4:21
9. "Astral Suicide" – 2:47
10. "Egg N' Bass" – 1:34
11. "Spokes of Uridium" – 8:07

== Personnel ==
=== Chrome Hoof ===
- Lola Olafisoye: Vocal
- Andy Gustard: Guitars, Percussion
- Emma Sullivan: Vocal, Keyboards, Vocoder, Trumpet, Percussion
- Emmett Elvin: Keyboards, Synthesizers, Sampler
- Chloe Herington: Bassoon, Sax, Percussion
- Sarah Anderson: Violin, Viola, Percussion, Backing Vocal
- Leo Smee: Bass, Synthesizers, Percussion, Backing Vocal
- Milo Smee: Drums, Percussion, Synthesizers

=== Additional musicians ===
- Tim Bowen: Cello
- Lee Dorrian: Guest Vocals
- Hannah Morris: Dancer
- Nuwella Love: Additional Vocals

== Production ==
- Produced By Chrome Hoof & Harvey Birrell
- Recorded & Engineered By Harvey Birrell
- Mastered By Tim Turan
