= Unending Ascending =

Studio album by Gong
- Released: 3 November 2023
- Studio: Snorkel Studios, London
- Length: 39:58
- Label: Kscope
- Producer: Frank Byng; Gong

Gong chronology
Pulsing Signals (2022)	Unending Ascending (2023)

Singles from Unending Ascending
- 1. "Tiny Galaxies" Released: 31 August 2023; 2. "All Clocks Reset" Released: 5 October 2023

Professional ratings
Review scores
Source	Rating
Financial Times	3/5 stars
Prog	3.5/5 stars

Unending Ascending (subtitled A Pan-Galactic Suite by Gong) is the sixteenth studio album by Gong, released on 3 November 2023 by Kscope.

== Track listing ==
Music by Gong. Lyrics by Kavus Torabi.

1. "Tiny Galaxies" – 3:33
2. "My Guitar Is a Spaceship" – 4:09
3. "Ship of Ishtar" – 8:33
4. "O, Arcturus" – 3:55
5. "All Clocks Reset" – 4:09
6. "Choose Your Goddess" – 6:49
7. "Lunar Invocation" – 4:34
8. "Asleep Do We Lay" – 4:16

== Personnel ==
- Ian East – saxophones and woodwinds
- Fabio Golfetti – guitar and singing
- Cheb Nettles – drums and singing
- Dave Sturt – bass guitar and singing
- Kavus Torabi – singing and guitar

With

- Saskia Maxwell – singing on "Ship of Ishtar", "Lunar Invocation" and "Asleep Do We Lay"

- Gong – additional instruments
- Frank Byng – cymbal scrapes on "Choose Your Goddess"

Technical

- Recorded and mixed by Frank Byng at Snorkel Studios, London
- Saskia's vocals recorded by Silas Wynne
- Produced by Frank Byng and Gong
- Mastered by James Plotkin

Artwork

- Mandala design by Daevid Allen
- Artwork @fiftysevendesign

== Charts ==
Chart performance for Unending Ascending
Chart (2023)	Peak position
UK Album Sales (OCC)	57
UK Album Downloads (Official Charts)	33
UK Physical Albums (OCC)	65
UK Progressive Albums (Official Charts)	6
UK Rock & Metal Albums (Official Charts)	8
UK Independent Albums (Official Charts)	22
