= Hip to the Jag =

Studio album by Kavus Torabi
- Released: 22 May 2020
- Genre: Psychedelia
- Length: 45:45
- Label: Believers Roast

Kavus Torabi chronology
Solar Divination (2018)	Hip to the Jag (2020)	Heaven's Sun (2023)

Singles from Hip to the Jag
- 1. "Cemetery of Light" Released: 1 May 2020

Hip to the Jag is the debut solo studio album by Iranian-born musician Kavus Torabi released on Believers Roast on 22 May 2020.

== Critical reception ==
In his review for Louder, Joe Banks called the album "a meditation on – and sometimes confrontation with – unseen worlds and the realm beyond the senses." Roger Trenwith of The Progressive Aspect said that the album "leaves you feeling sad and happy all at once, and it has taken you on a journey through Kavus’s soul, and maybe shone a light into yours, too." On Echoes and Dust, Zachary Nathanson noted that Torabi "doesn’t pull any punches bringing his own music to life with his debut solo album [...] He always wants to push forwards and see what the next flight will take him to next. Is he ever going to slow down? Absolutely not. But Hip to the Jag is the album we need to have music inside our systems for a time of healing in 2020."

== Track listing ==
All tracks are written by Kavus Torabi.

Side one
No.	Title	Length
1.	"Chart the Way"	2:42
2.	"Silent the Rotor"	4:24
3.	"A Body of Work"	2:31
4.	"The Peacock Throne"	3:49
5.	"You Broke My Fall"	7:02
6.	"Cemetery of Light"	3:54
Total length:		24:22

Side two
No.	Title	Length
1.	"Radio to Their World"	4:09
2.	"My Cold Rebirth"	4:57
3.	"Where the Eyeless Walk"	2:54
4.	"Slow Movements"	9:25
Total length:		21:25

== Personnel ==
Musicians

- Kavus Torabi – voice, harmonium, guitars, effects, starsail

with:

- Sima Torabi – bells on "Where the Eyeless Walk"

Technical

- Kavus Torabi – recording, mixing, artwork
- James Plotkin – mastering
- David Barclay – layout
