= Chloe Herington =

- Herington with Knifeworld in 2015

Background information
- Born: Nottingham, Nottinghamshire, England
- Education: Goldsmiths College, University of London (BMus)
- Occupations: Musician; lecturer; composer
- Instruments: Bassoon; saxophone; melodica; vocals; synthesiser; radio; recorder
- Label: Believers Roast
- Member of: Chrome Hoof; Knifeworld; VÄLVĒ; Lindsay Cooper Songbook; Swell Maps C21; Cardiacs
- Partner: Craig Fortnam
- Website: chloeherington.com

Chloe Herington (Note: Styled as Chlöe Herington, written in some sources as Herrington and in a The Quietus article as Hetherington.) is an English musician, lecturer and composer who has been a member of the progressive rock band Chome Hoof for two decades. With Kavus Torabi's psychedelic band Knifeworld, Herington contributed bassoon and saxophone to their horn section. She has been part of Cardiacs's live lineup since 2025.

== Career ==
Herington with Chrome Hoof in 2008

Herington is a member of the progressive rock band Chrome Hoof. In a review for 2010's Crush Depth, The Quietus writer John Doran noted the "healthy portion" of saxophone provided by Herington on the tracks "Vapourise" and "Core Delusion". Kavus Torabi was playing in Chrome Hoof at the time that he need a band to play his solo album under the name Knifeworld, so he got Herington and Chrome Hoof keyboard player Emmet Elvin involved. With Torabi's psychedelic troupe, Herington contributed to the horn section, a major component of the band's sound. In addition to playing bassoon and brass, she shared vocal duties with Torabi and glockenspiel player Melanie Woods, contributing backing vocals, and played saxophone. On the 2014 album The Unravelling, her signature bassoon accents the lumbering shanty "Send Him Home Seaworthy".

Herington works with former Chrome Hoof member Emma Sullivan as VÄLVĒ. Herington played with Swell Maps C21, a 21st century version of the original experimental DIY band Swell Maps, on melodica and synthesiser.

In 2021, Herington's first solo album Silent Reflux was released by the Believers Roast label. The album was written and produced solely by Herington, but was recorded with a dozen helpers including most of Knifeworld.

Herington aided Cardiacs Family for their Sing to Tim live shows in 2024, covering the parts of Sarah Jones. She has been part of Cardiacs's live lineup as a saxophone player since 2025, on the back of the release of their album LSD.

== Personal life ==
Since 2019, Herington has lived in the village Homington with her partner, the fellow music composer Craig Fortnam, as of 2024. The two have put on several events including the Homington International Arts Festival at St Mary the Virgin Church.

== Solo discography ==
Albums

- Silent Reflux (2021)
- Fugue (2022)

Extended plays

- Live at Cafe Oto (2021)

Appearances

- [Untitled] - [Titled] - [Retitled] (2021) by Atona ("Seven Sisters" featuring Sam Barton)
