= The Utopia Strong =

British electronic band

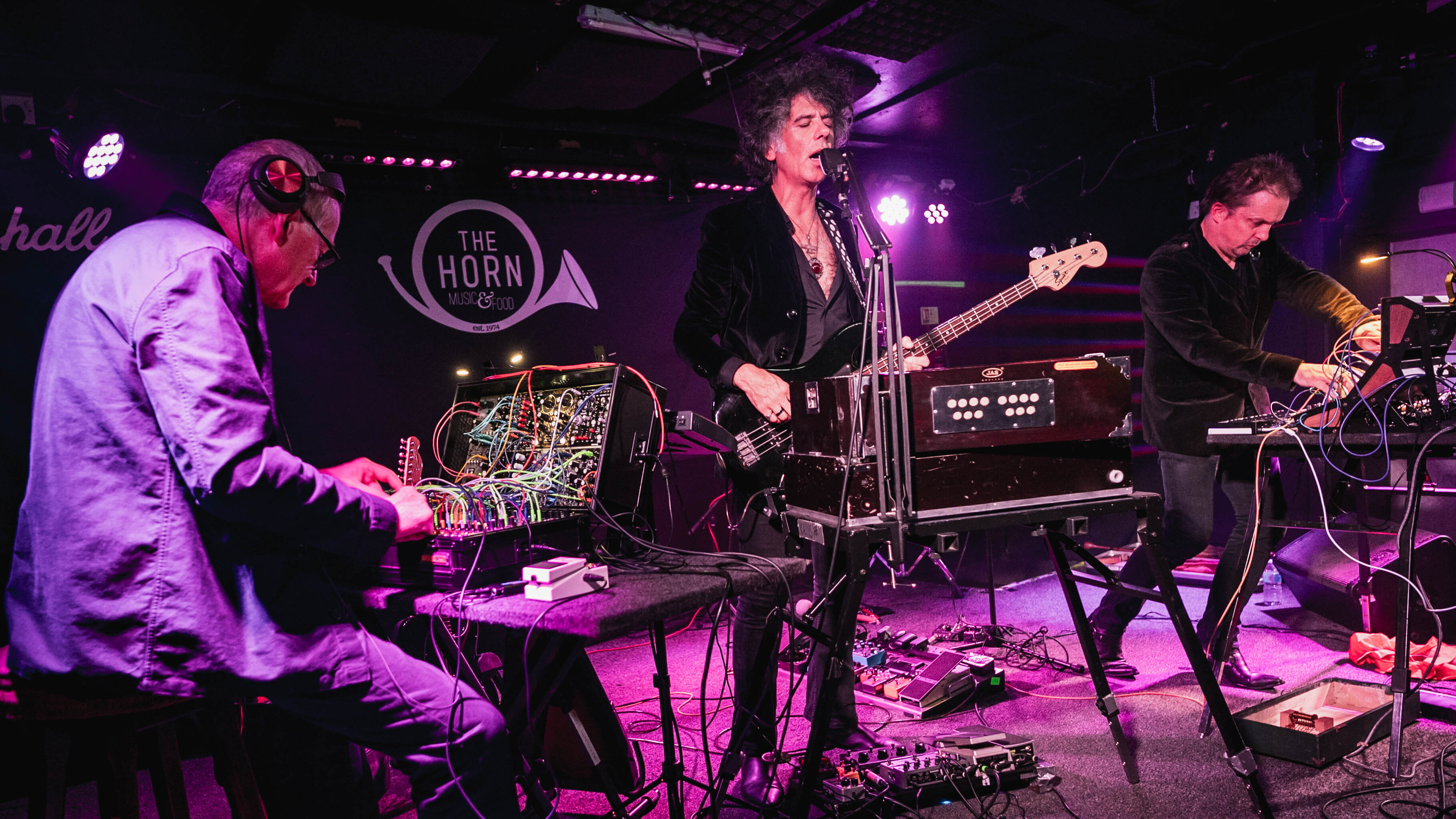
- The Utopia Strong in 2025

Background information
- Origin: Glastonbury, England
- Genres: Electronic; psychedelic; ambient; experimental
- Years active: 2018–present
- Labels: Rocket Recordings; GLS
- Members: Steve Davis; Kavus Torabi; Michael J. York

The Utopia Strong are a British electronic band formed in Glastonbury, England, in 2018. The group consists of Steve Davis, Kavus Torabi, and Michael J. York. They released their self-titled debut album in 2019 and their second album, International Treasure, in 2022.

== History ==
The Utopia Strong originated from an experimental improvised session in Glastonbury on the evening of 2 January 2018, where they left a recorder running through their 13-hour session. Steve Davis, a six-time World Snooker Champion, was recognised for his love of progressive rock, soul and jazz-funk. He booked the French progressive rock band Magma to play three sold-out nights at the Bloomsbury Theatre and later became a DJ with the radio show Interesting Alternative on Phoenix FM. At a Magma gig, Davis bonded with Iranian-born musician Kavus Torabi, a storied guitarist with Gong and Cardiacs. Davis and Torabi met multi-instrumentalist Michael J. York of Coil after DJing at the 2017 Glastonbury Festival, and the three decided to form a band. In the Utopia Strong, Davis plays analogue modular synth. The band have been described as a supergroup.

The Utopia Strong’s debut gig was a modular synthesiser trade show, in surroundings "so cramped that Davis kept thinking of the scene in Airplane! when a flailing guitar results in the sick child losing his drip." The band released the ten-minute long track "Brainsurgeons 3" on 11 June 2019, and their self-titled debut album on 13 September 2019 on Rocket Recordings. The album features a guest vocal appearance by Mediæval Bæbes' Katharine Blake.

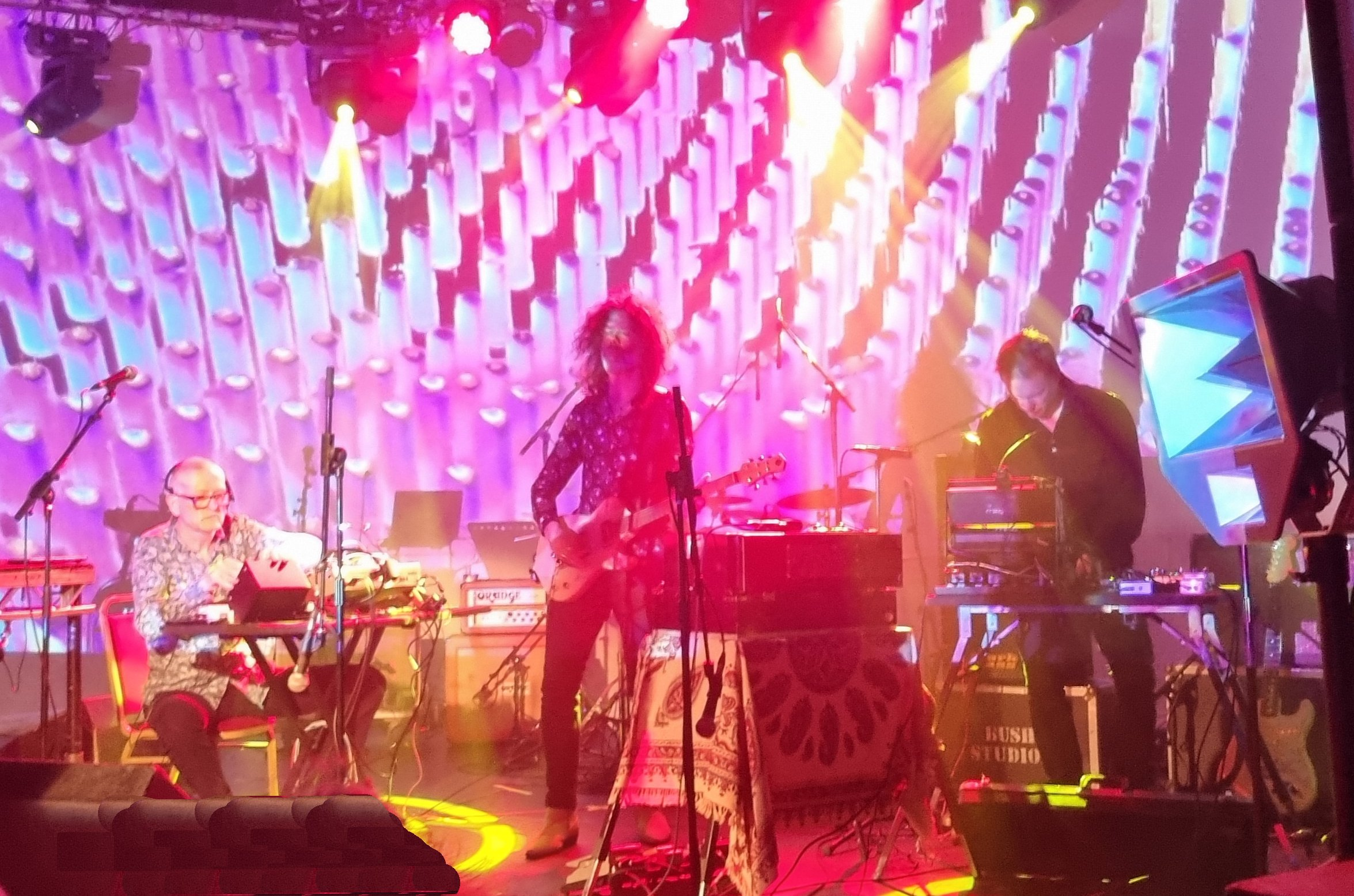
The band performing in Cambridge in 2023.

The Utopia Strong's second album International Treasure was released in 2022. The Quietus listed the album at number 25 on their Albums Of The Year So Far Chart 2022. The band appeared on BBC Breakfast on 25 March 2023. They supported Steve Hillage's 2023 UK tour, with Torabi also a member of Hillage's backing band.

The Utopia Strong played a live set at Acid Horse 2025, a Wiltshire festival co-organised by John Doran of The Quietus, for which Torabi had been on a previous bill. The band headlined the 2025 Angel Field Festival at Capstone Theatre in Liverpool Hope University's creative campus. Their third or fourth album Doperider was released on 10 October 2025 on Rocket, with the first single "Harpies" featuring vocals by Blake.

Torabi has said that the Utopia Strong influences his work with Gong, and vice versa.

== Members ==
Adapted from The BBC Sessions (2024) liner notes.

- Steve Davis – modular synth
- Kavus Torabi – guitar, bass guitar, harmonium, voice
- Michael J. York – modular synth, percussion, duduk, pipes

== Discography ==
=== Studio albums ===
- The Utopia Strong (Rocket, 2019)
- International Treasure (Rocket, 2022)
- Collapse (self-released, 2025)
- Doperider (Rocket, 2025)

=== Live albums ===
- Alphabet of the Magi (self-released, 2020)
- Dreamsweeper (self-released, 2020)
- Ninth Art (self-released, 2021)
- Gyre (self-released, 2023)
- The BBC Sessions (Rocket, 2024)

=== Singles ===
- "Brainsurgeons 3" (2019, The Utopia Strong)
- "Konta Chorus" (2019, The Utopia Strong)
- "Strange Altar" (2019)
- "Shepherdess" (2022, International Treasure)
- "Castalia" (2022, International Treasure)
- "Gatekeeper" (2023, Golden Lion Sounds)
- "Lamp of Glory" (2024, The BBC Sessions)
- "Harpies" (2025, Doperider)
- "The Atavist" (2025, Doperider)

=== Remixes ===
- "Rechargeable" (2019, with Snapped Ankles)

=== Appearances ===
- "Harpies" (2023, Rocket Recordings: Launch300)
- "Old Mathers" (2025, Ein Null: 10 Years Of Sprechen)
