= Chris Ellis (musician) =

British musician, composer and songwriter

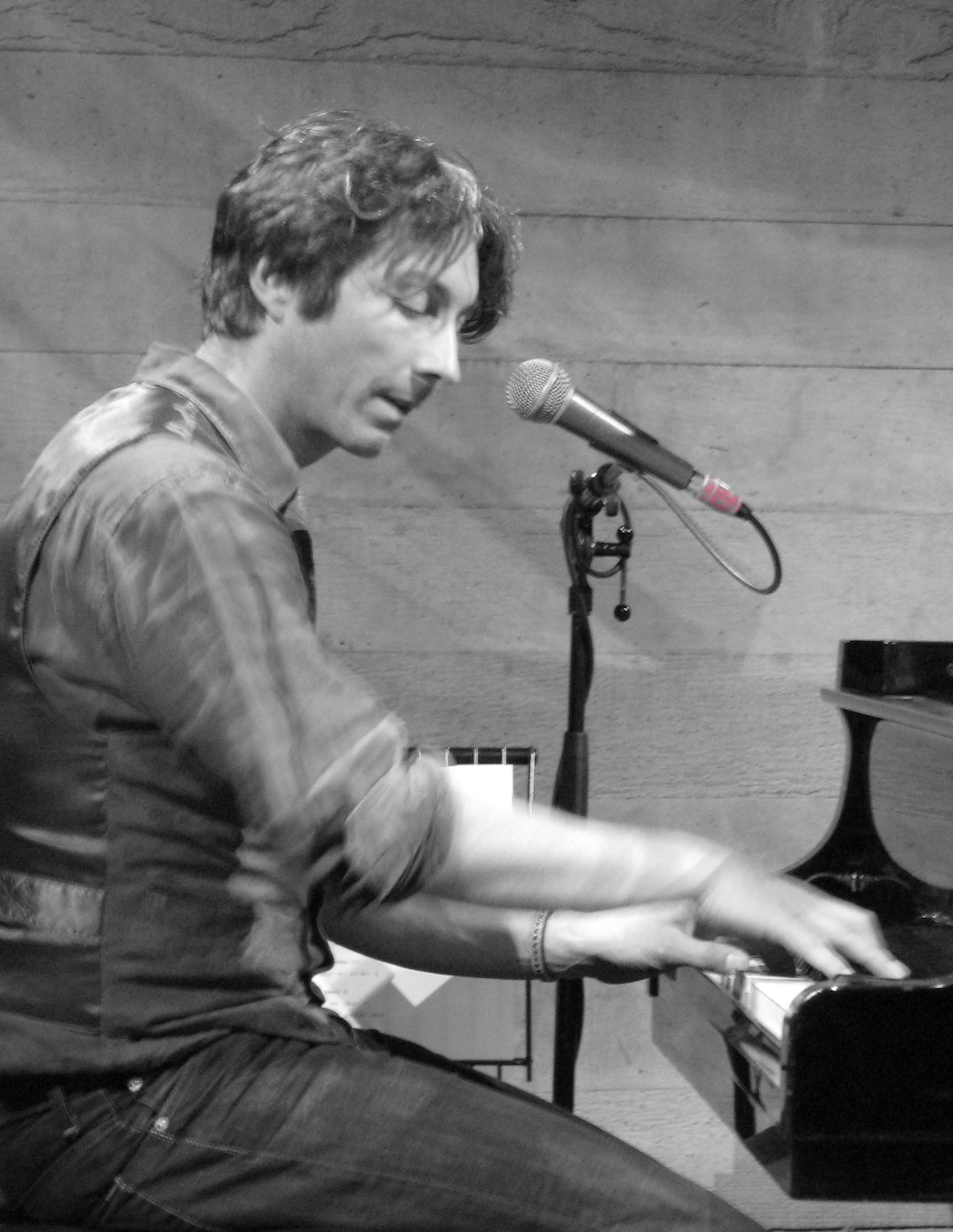

Chris Ellis (also known as Christopher Ellis) is a British songwriter, composer and multi-instrumentalist, who has been recording and touring in the UK since 1984. Chris Ellis' current work includes live piano improvisations, drawn from the traditions of Western classical, jazz, blues, folk and more. In addition to his solo work, Ellis has played piano and guitar with several bands, including the Anglesey based band Ghostriders of which he was a member between 1982 and 1991. He has performed regularly with Gong Bassist Dave Sturt and with Canadian singer-songwriter Celeste Lovick since 2001. Between 2012 and 2022 Chris Ellis has toured with the TCPA's Land of Promise show, performing songs with violinist Rosie Toll.

Appearances have included the Hay Festival, Stainsby Festival, The Hostry Festival, Glastonbury Festival, the Djanogly stage at The National Theatre and numerous other festivals and venues across the UK and in Canada.

Albums written and recorded by Ellis include: Tread Softly (2001), First Reflection (2003), Piano Improvisations (2009) and Dreaming (2010). Ellis has also contributed to several other albums, including Gong's Rejoice! I'm Dead! (2016), Domenic DeCicco's 'Never Letting Go' (2021), and Brian Boothby's Honour (2010) and 'Firegazing' (2017). Ellis also co-produced and performed on the TCPA's 'Love, Life and Liberty' Album, which features readings from actors Tony Robinson and Ben Miles.
