= Chrome Hoof =

Chamber-rock group

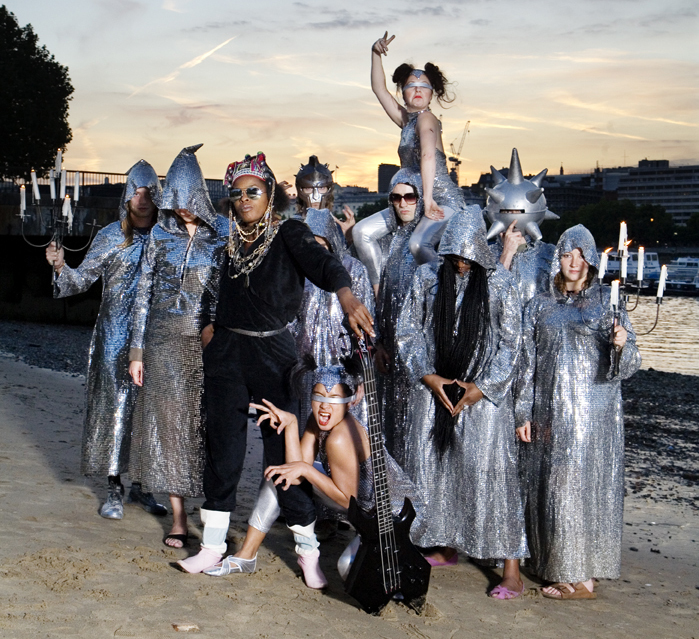
- Chrome Hoof on a Summer of 2007 beach, dressed mostly in cowls, promoting Pre-Emptive False Rapture

Background information
- Also known as: Hooof!
- Origin: London, England, United Kingdom
- Genres: Experimental, chamber rock
- Years active: 2000–present
- Labels: Tritone Records, Rise Above, Southern, Cuneiform
- Members: Leo Smee; Alex Thomas; Emmett Elvin; Andy "Mr. Custard" Gustard; James Sedwards; Emma Sullivan; Chloe Herington; Sarah Anderson; Bob Grim; Shingai Shoniwa; Chan Brown
- Past members: Milo Smee; Kavus Torabi; Lola Olafisoye
- Website: ChromeHoof.com

Chrome Hoof are an experimental chamber rock orchestra based in London, England. The group was formed in 2000 by Cathedral bassist Leo Smee and his brother Milo Smee. Initially performing as a duo, their music was mostly electronic. Since the start, however, the group have continuously recruited new members playing various instruments. As of 2007, the group had about ten members and instruments such as saxophone, trumpet, bassoon, violin, guitars, bass and drums.

Being a large orchestra, Chrome Hoof's music spans several diverse music genres such as metal, electro, funk, jazz, disco and chamber music. Their music has been described as progressive, futuristic and psychedelic.

== Members ==
- Leo Smee – bass, vocals, synth', percussion
- Alex Thomas – drums, percussion
- Emmett Elvin – keyboards, synth', sampler
- Andy "Mr. Custard" Gustard – guitar, percussion
- James Sedwards – guitar
- Emma Sullivan – trumpet, vocals, keyboard, percussion
- Chloe Herington – bassoon, saxophone, percussion
- Sarah Anderson – violin, viola, percussion, backing vocals
- Shingai Shoniwa – vocals
- Chan Brown – backing vocals

== Discography ==
=== Albums ===
- 2004 – Chrome Hoof
- 2007 – Pre-Emptive False Rapture
- 2010 – Crush Depth
- 2013 – Chrome Black Gold

=== EPs ===
- 2006 – Beyond Zade
