= Dave Sturt =

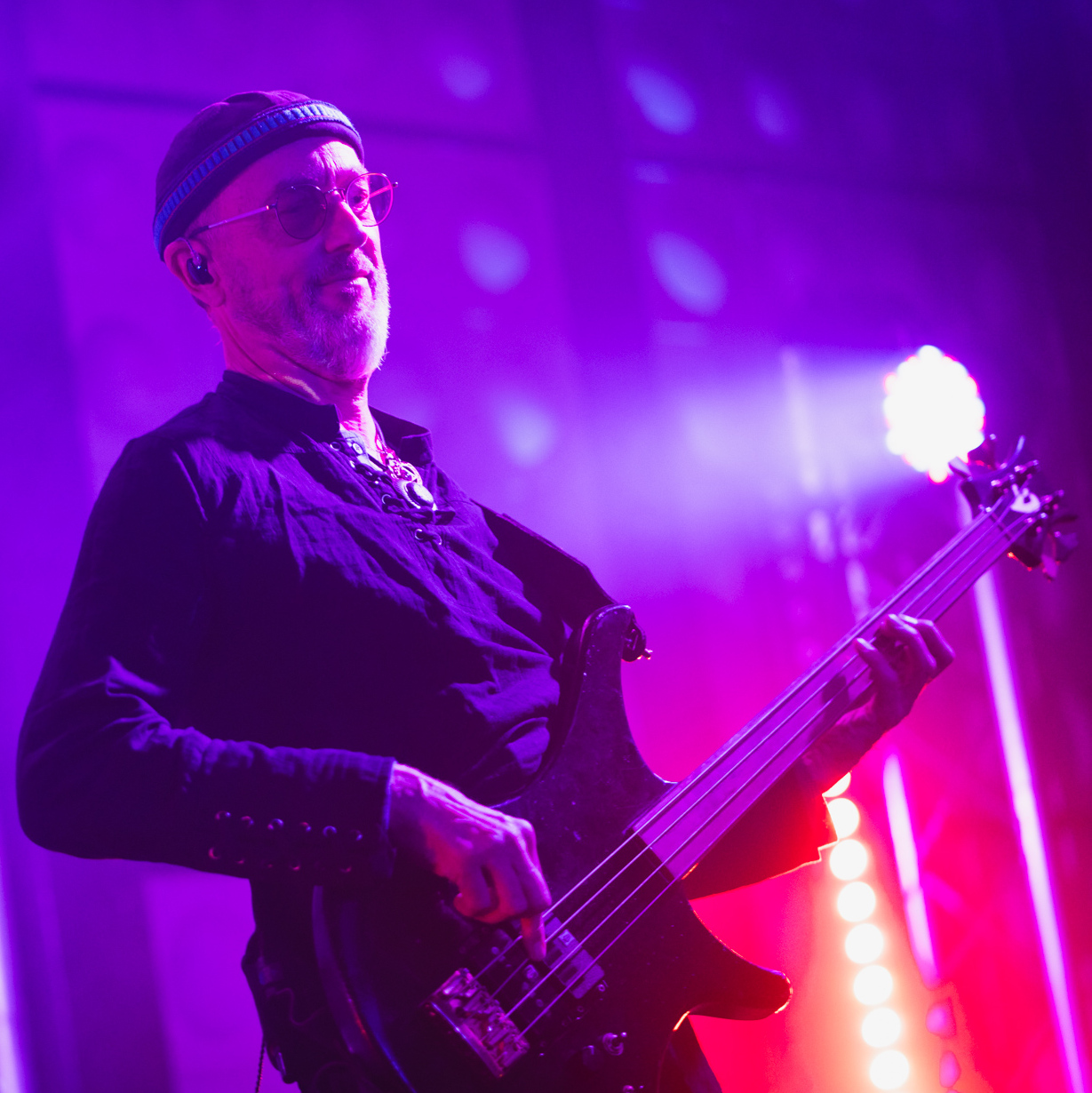
- Sturt with Gong in 2025

Background information
- Born: 14 August 1960 (age 65); Middlesbrough, North Yorkshire, England
- Genres: Progressive rock; symphonic rock; world music
- Occupations: Musician; composer; producer; engineer
- Instruments: Bass; vocals
- Years active: 1982–present
- Labels: Red Hot; Acme Records; Burning Shed; Repertoire; WindWeaver; Madfish
- Member of: Gong
- Formerly of: Jade Warrior; Cipher
- Website: davesturt.co.uk

Dave Sturt (born 14 August 1960) is an English bassist and record producer.

== Musical career ==
Sturt began playing bass guitar and recording at the age of 17. In 1982 he moved to London and soon broke into the session scene working alongside film composer Michael Kamen, Pink Floyd guitarist David Gilmour, Roxy Music drummer Andy Newmark, and David Bowie sideman Earl Slick amongst others. In 1987 Sturt joined Jade Warrior, recording three albums as bass player, composer and co-producer alongside Tom Newman (Tubular Bells). He went on to compose themes and incidental music for film and television as well as playing sessions for Pol Brennan (Clannad), BeatsystemUK (on Myspace) and Theo Travis. Live work developed with Cuban/American guitarist Isaac Guillory, Thee na Shee, The Fraser Sisters, Andy Sheppard, Bosco D’Olivera and Bill Nelson. Sturt performed for many years with Theo Travis in Cipher, producing three albums and several scores to silent films. Prior to Cipher, the pair had worked together in the four-piece jazz fusion band The Other Side, releasing the album Dangerous Days in 1994.

During 2009 and 2010, Sturt toured Europe playing bass for both Gong and Steve Hillage. In 2011 he played bass with Bill Nelson on the Classic Rock Legends live DVD.

2012 has seen Sturt composing soundtracks for 'Ben Rushgrove - a documentary' for Channel 4 and for 'Past Lives' - (along with Theo Travis) - a touring live performance with archive footage from The Media Archive for Central England. He is also touring Europe, the UK and Japan with Gong

2013 saw more live work with Gong in Brazil and the development of the Past Lives Project - a cinefilm and music project funded by Arts Council England and Heritage Lottery Fund. There were more performances with Gong in 2014 in Brazil, France and the UK and also the Gong album ‘I See You’ was released - with Sturt as bass player, co-composer and co-producer.

Sturt's first solo album 'Dreams & Absurdities' was released in 2015 featuring guest appearances from Daevid Allen, Jon Field, Fabio Golfetti, Steve Hillage, Bill Nelson (musician), Kavus Torabi and Theo Travis. It was engineered and mixed by Sturt and mastered by Andy Jackson.

In 2015-16 he again toured with Gong around the UK and in Norway and began work on composing the first Gong album since Daevid Allen's death. The album Rejoice! I'm Dead! was released in 2016 - with Sturt as bass player, co-composer and 'overseer and gatekeeper'.

In 2024 he toured and recorded with "This Celestial Engine".

He is an endorsee of Vigier basses and Markbass amplification.

== Discography ==
=== Albums ===
- Weightless mini-album (2012) limited, self-made edition of 30 copies
- Dreams and Absurdities (2015) Esoteric/Antenna
- This Celestial Engine (2024) Discus Music with Roy Powell and Ted Parsons

=== Collaboration albums ===
- Breathing the Storm (1992) [Jade Warrior] Red Hot
- Distant Echoes (1993) [Jade Warrior] Red Hot
- Dangerous Days (1994) [The Other Side]
- Secret Island (1996) [Theo Travis] 33 Jazz Records
- Stereo (1996) [Gary Smith] Chronoscope Records
- No Ordinary Man (1999) [Cipher] Hidden Art
- To Wake the Stone (1997) [The Crack] Triskell
- Strange Horse (1999) [Thee-na-Shee]
- Obvious (2000) [Obvious] (Andy Jackson) Tube
- Going Around (2001) [The Fraser Sisters] No Masters
- One Who Whispers (2002) [Cipher] Gliss
- Elemental Forces (2005) [Cipher] Burning Shed
- Nottingham Songs (2006) [Mat Andasun]
- NOW (2008) [Jade Warrior] Windweaver Music
- I See You (2014) [Gong] Madfish
- Rejoice! I'm Dead! (2016) [Gong] Madfish

=== Collaboration albums as mix engineer ===
- Discretion (2014) [Travis & Fripp] Panegyric

=== Tracks on collaboration albums ===
- "This World" on The Dream Academy (1985) [The Dream Academy] uncredited

=== Collaboration singles ===
- "Easy" / "Holding Out" (1981) [Moulin Rouge] Teesbeat Records
- "Goodbye Scarlet" 12" (1987) [Sara Davis] September
- "Walk on the Wild Side" (1988) [Beatsystem] 4th & Broadway

=== Collaboration DVDs ===
- Classic Rock Magazine Legends filmed live at Metropolis Studios (2011) [Bill Nelson and the Gentlemen Rocketeers] ITV Studios Home Entertainment

=== Tracks on compilation albums ===
- "White Cloud, Blue Sky" [Cipher] and "Boundless Sky" [Thee-na-Shee] on The Sky Goes All the Way Home (1999) [Various] Voiceprint
- "The Lodger Pt 2" [Cipher] exclusive track plus "No Ordinary Man" [Cipher] on Hidden Art Sampler (2000) [Various] Hidden Art
- "Psychogroove Reconstruction/Remix" [Cipher] on View from the Edge (Deluxe Edition) 2nd CD with alternative takes and remixes (2004) [Theo Travis] 33 Jazz Records
