= List of Cardiacs band members =

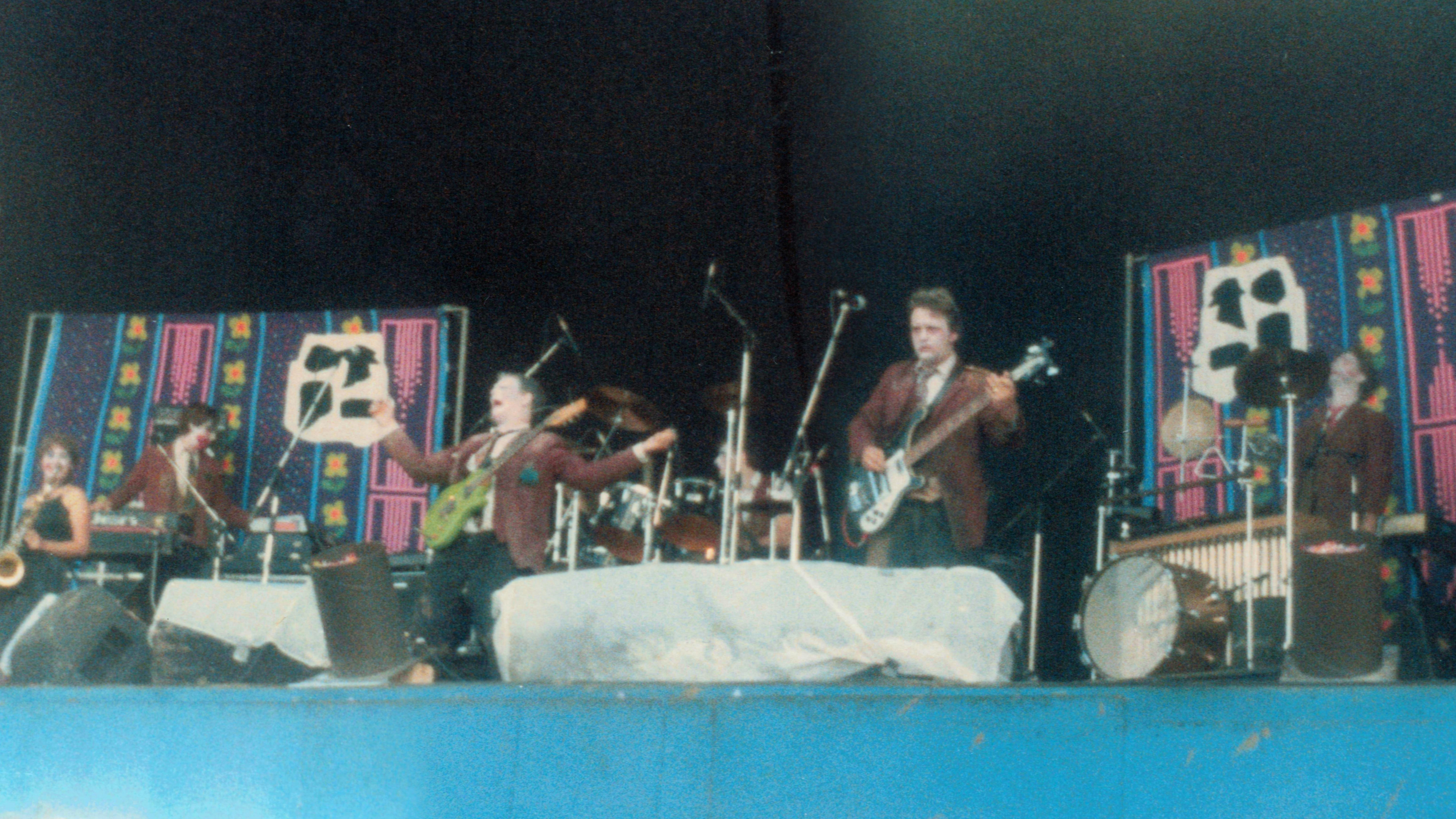
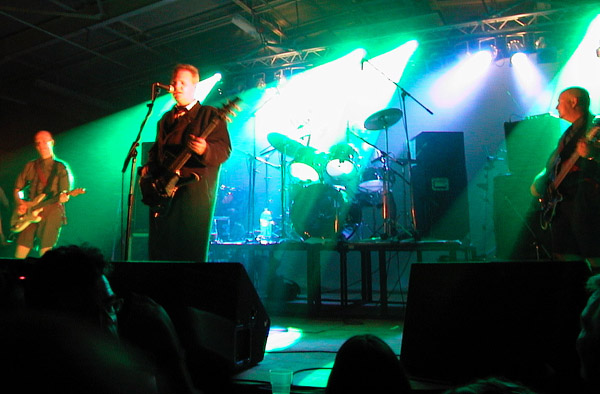
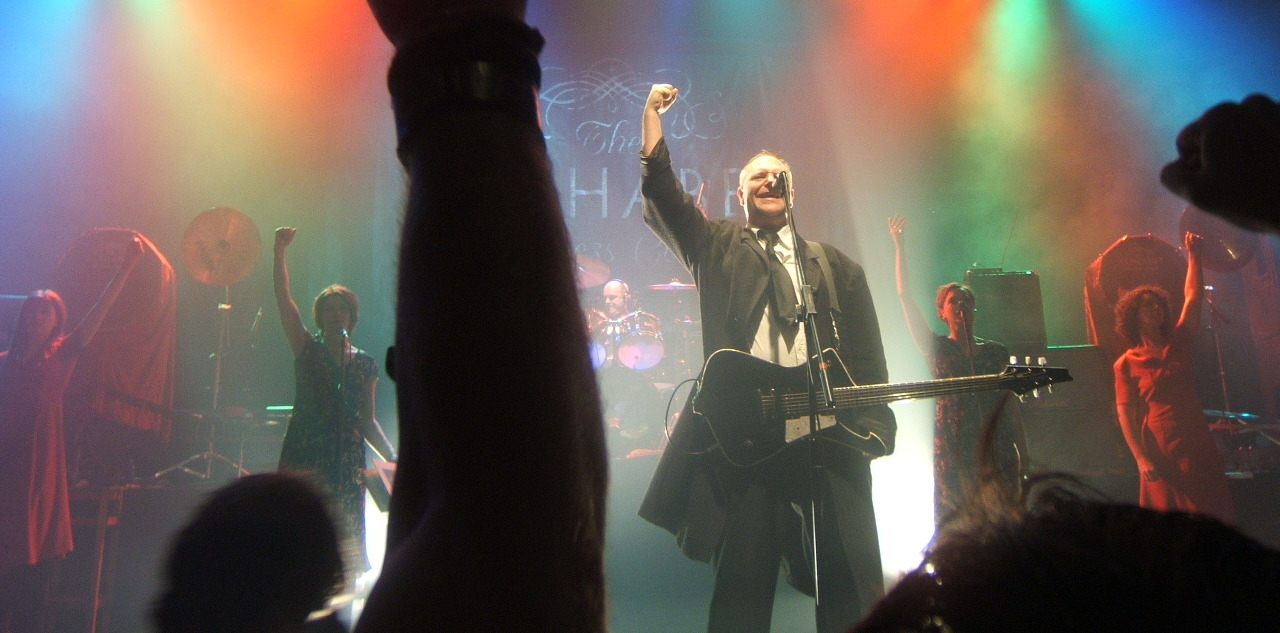
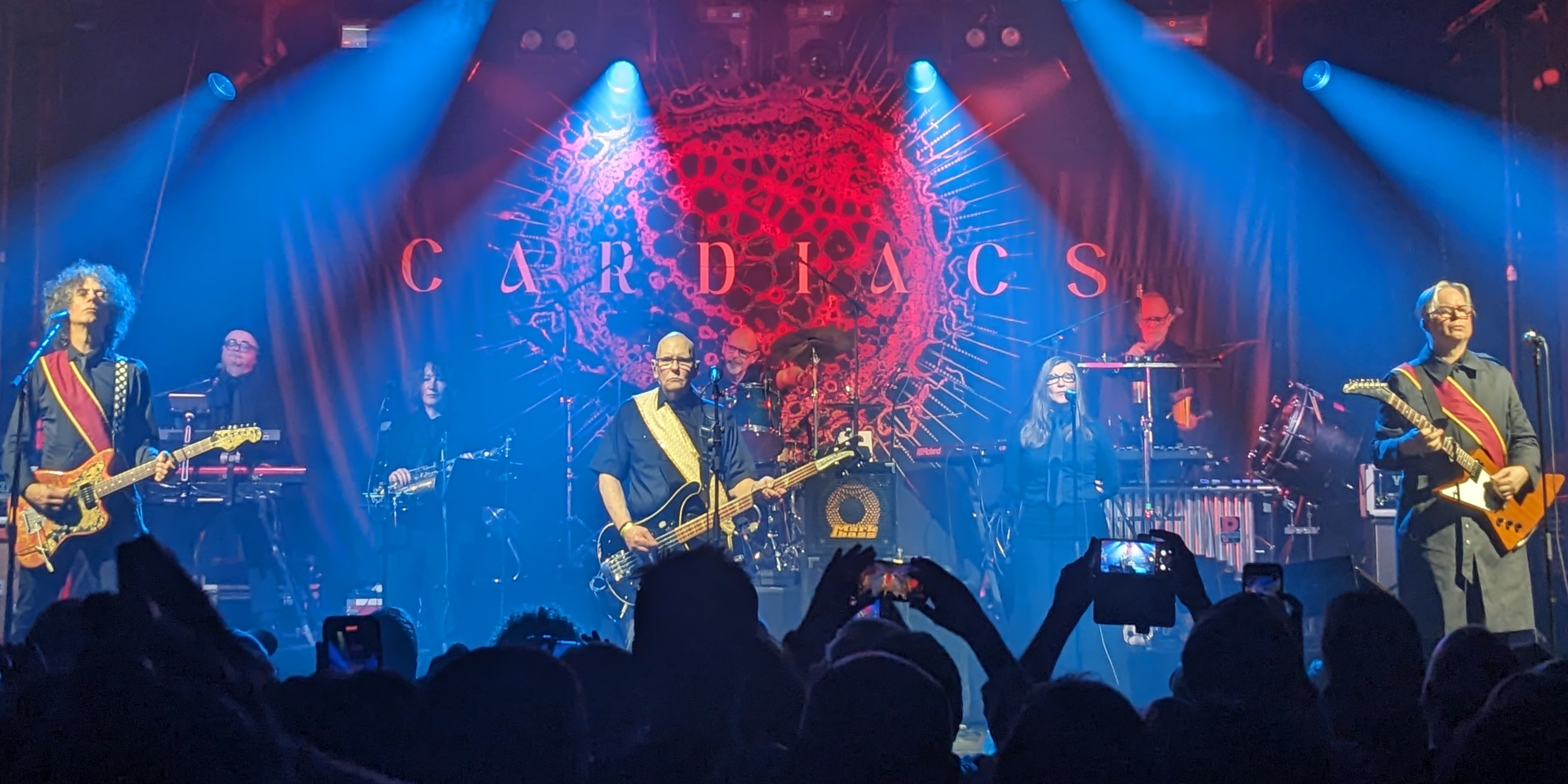
Cardiacs performing in 1986, 1998, 2005, and 2026

Cardiacs are an English rock band hailing from Kingston upon Thames, Surrey. The band was formed by frontman Tim Smith with his brother bassist Jim Smith, vocalist Michael Pugh and drummer Peter Tagg in 1977. Since its inception, more than a dozen members have cycled through the group, contributing keyboards, percussion, vocals and woodwind. The Smith brothers were the only constant members in Cardiacs' regularly changing line-up.

== History ==
After playing his first gig as Gazunder, Tim Smith formed Cardiacs under the name Cardiac Arrest, (Note: The band was initially called "The Filth" and went by various other names before deciding on Cardiacs, including "The Obvious Identity" and "The Alphabet".) and released their debut single "A Bus for a Bus on the Bus" in 1979. It was recorded by the band's first full lineup, including keyboardist Colvin "Max" Mayers and saxophonist Ralph Cade. The same year, Tagg was replaced by Mark Cawthra and went on to form the Trudy with Cade. Cardiac Arrest's reputation was kickstarted with two cassette-only albums — The Obvious Identity (1980) and Toy World (1981) — and they adopted the name Cardiacs on the second. During this time, Mayers left and later joined the Sound. Cade was replaced by Sarah Cutts in 1981 on keyboards and saxophone/clarinet, who married Tim Smith three years later. By 1983, the band had reached a semi-stable lineup with percussionist and keyboardist Tim Quy, keyboardist William D. Drake and drummer Dominic Luckman. For a short time, Cardiacs were an eight-piece with the employment of guitarist Graham Simmonds and saxophonist Marguerite Johnston, who featured on the cassette album The Seaside (1984) released by their own label the Alphabet Business Concern.

The six-piece lineup toured extensively alongside Alphabet label representatives the Consultant and Miss Swift. Shortly after releasing On Land and in the Sea (1989), Cardiacs were joined by guitarist Christian "Bic" Hayes the same year. Hayes appeared on the video and subsequent live album All That Glitters Is a Mares Nest (1992; 1995), which was also their last performance with Quy. Drake and Sarah Smith also left the group, continuing to guest on future albums, and Hayes was replaced by guitarist and keyboardist Jon Poole in 1991. By 1992, the band had slimmed to a four-piece for Heaven Born and Ever Bright, displaying a new metal-leaning sound. Luckman was replaced by drummer Bob "Babba" Leith in 1993, giving Cardiacs their second "classic" lineup on Sing to God (1996). The lineup continued on Guns (1999) with assistance from session musicians. Mayers died on 26 December 1993 of AIDS.

Poole subsequently left Cardiacs to join the Wildhearts as a bassist after playing in Silver Ginger 5. He was replaced by guitar tech, Kavus Torabi in 2003 who played on the two volume live album The Special Garage Concerts (2005). Between 2004 and 2008, Cardiacs expanded their lineup to include vocalists Claire Lemmon and Melanie Woods of Sidi Bou Said and Sharron Fortnam of the North Sea Radio Orchestra, as well as percussionists Cathy Harabaras and Dawn Staple. The collective released the single "Ditzy Scene" in 2007, teasing an upcoming double album called LSD which was due to be released in October 2008. Cardiacs stopped touring the same year, and the band's lineup comprised Tim Smith, Jim Smith, Bob Leith, Kavus Torabi, Melanie Woods and Cathy Harabaras until the 2008 hospitalisation of Tim Smith resulted in an indefinite hiatus. On 22 July 2020, it was confirmed by Torabi that Smith had died of a heart attack the previous night. Former percussionist Tim Quy died on 2 February 2023 after a lengthy battle with several health problems.

Cardiacs announced their return to the stage in 2023 in Tim Smith's honour, playing the Garage on 4 May 2024 (subsequently adding dates 3 May at the Garage and 5 May at Brudenell Social Club). On 3 May, the band consisted of Jim Smith, Hayes, Leith and Poole, with Craig Fortnam (percussion, keys), Chloe Herington (saxophone), and Adrien Rodes (keyboards). Sharron Fortnam, Joanne Spratley, Tiny Wood from Ultrasound and Sleepy People, Torabi and Cawthra were guests.

In 2025, the band released their final album, LSD, with a line-up of Chloe Herington (woodwind), Mike Vennart (vocals), Jane Kaye (vocals), Sharron Fortnam (vocals), Jim Smith (bass, vocals), Craig Fortnam (vocals, glockenspiel), Kavus Torabi (guitar, vocals) and Bob Leith (drums, vocals). The album also featured Rose-Ellen Kemp (vocals), James Larcombe (piano, keyboards), Stephen Gilchrist (drums), Jo Spratley (vocals), Suzanne Kirby (vocals), Melanie Woods (vocals), Claire Lemmon (vocals) and Rob Crow ("drumfuckery").

== Members ==
=== Current ===
Image	Name	Alias (Note: Used on early recordings as Cardiac Arrest)	Years active	Instruments	Release contributions
	Jim Smith	Patty Pilf	1977–2008; 2024 (Cardiacs Family); 2025–present	bass; vocals	all releases
	Bob "Babba" Leith		1993–2008; 2024 (Cardiacs Family); 2025–present	drums; vocals	all releases from Sing to God (1996)
	Kavus Torabi		2003–2008; 2025–present (guest 2024 with Cardiacs Family)	guitar; vocals	The Special Garage Concerts (2005); "Ditzy Scene" (2007); "Vermin Mangle" (2020); LSD (2025)
	Sharron Fortnam (née Saddington)		2004–2007; 2025–present (guest 2024 with Cardiacs Family)	vocals	Guns (1999) – guest appearance on four tracks; Greatest Hits (2002) – previously unreleased track "Faster Than Snakes with a Ball and a Chain"; LSD (2025)
	Craig Fortnam		2024 (Cardiacs Family); 2025–present	percussion; keyboards; vocals; acoustic guitar	LSD (2025)
	Chloe Herington		2024 (Cardiacs Family); 2025–present	saxophone; vocals	none
	Mike Vennart		2025–present (guest 2024 with Cardiacs Family)	vocals; guitar	LSD (2025)
	Rhodri Marsden		2025–present	keyboards; vocals	none

=== Former ===
Image	Name	Alias(es)	Years active	Instruments	Release contributions
	Tim Smith	Philip Pilf	1977–2008 (died 2020)	vocals (backing 1977–1980, lead 1980–2008); guitar; keyboards	all releases to date
	Michael Pugh	Peter Boker	1977–1980	lead vocals	"A Bus for a Bus on the Bus" (1979); The Obvious Identity (1980); Cardiacs E.P. (2025) – "Aukamakic / Dead Mouse"; LSD (2025) guest voice
	Peter Tagg	Richard Targett	1977–1979	drums	"A Bus for a Bus on the Bus" (1979); Cardiacs E.P. (2025) – "Aukamakic / Dead Mouse"
	Colvin "Max" Mayers	Duncan Doilet; Max Cat; Button Poppet	1978–1981 (died 1993)	keyboards; vocals	all releases from "A Bus for a Bus on the Bus" (1979) to Toy World (1981); Cardiacs E.P. (2025) – "Aukamakic / Dead Mouse"
	Ralph Cade (Note: Written "Ralf Cade" on the liner notes of Greatest Hits.)	Raphel Cadd	1978–1979	saxophone	"A Bus for a Bus on the Bus" (1979)
	Mark Cawthra	Little Bobby Shattocks	1979–1983 (guest 2024 with Cardiacs Family)	drums (1979–1981); keyboards (1981–1983); vocals	all releases from The Obvious Identity (1980) to Seaside Treats (1985); Big Ship (1987) engineering
	Sarah Smith (née Cutts, now Jones)		1980–1989 (touring and studio guest 1989–2007)	saxophone; clarinet; vocals; occasional keyboards	all releases from Toy World (1981) to On Land and in the Sea (1989); Songs for Ships and Irons (1991) – previously unreleased track "Everything is Easy"; Heaven Born and Ever Bright (1992) – guest appearance on six tracks; All That Glitters Is a Mares Nest (1995); Sing to God (1996) – guest appearance; Guns (1999) – guest appearance on two tracks
	Tim Quy		1981–1990 (substitute bass 1980–1981) (died 2023)	percussion; keyboards; bass (substitute)	Toy World (1981) – live sound credits only; all releases from The Seaside (1984) to On Land and in the Sea (1989); Archive Cardiacs (1989); Songs for Ships and Irons (1991) – previously unreleased track "Everything is Easy"; All That Glitters Is a Mares Nest (1995)
	Dominic Luckman		1982–1993	drums; occasional vocals	Toy World (1981) – lighting credits only; all releases from The Seaside (1984) to All That Glitters Is a Mares Nest (1995)
	William D. Drake		1983–1990 (Note: Drake was not replaced; live keyboard parts after his absence were pre-recorded on tape.)	keyboards; vocals	all releases from The Seaside (1984) to On Land and in the Sea (1989); Songs for Ships and Irons (1991) – previously unreleased track "Everything is Easy"; Heaven Born and Ever Bright (1992) – appears on one track; All That Glitters Is a Mares Nest (1995)
	Graham Simmonds		1983–1984	guitar	The Seaside (1984); all releases from Seaside Treats (1985) to On Land and in the Sea (1989) – production credits only
	Marguerite Johnston (Note: Written "Margurite Jonston" on the liner notes of Greatest Hits.)		1983–1984	saxophone	The Seaside (1984); Seaside Treats (1985)
	Christian "Bic" Hayes		1989–1991; 2024 (Cardiacs Family)	guitar; vocals	Heaven Born and Ever Bright (1992); All That Glitters Is a Mares Nest (1995)
	Jon Poole		1991–2003; 2024 (Cardiacs Family)	guitar; keyboards; vocals	Heaven Born and Ever Bright (1992); Sampler (1995) – previously unreleased track "Angleworm the Angel"; Sing to God (1996); Guns (1999); Greatest Hits (2002) – previously unreleased track "Faster Than Snakes with a Ball and a Chain"
	Cathy Harabaras		2004–2008	percussion	"Ditzy Scene" (2007); "Vermin Mangle" (2020)
	Melanie Woods		2004–2008	vocals	"Odd Even" (1996) – guest appearance on B-side "Hurricane"; "Ditzy Scene" (2007); "Vermin Mangle" (2020); LSD (2025)
	Claire Lemmon		2004–2007	vocals	Sing to God (1996) – appears on one track; "Ditzy Scene" (2007); "Vermin Mangle" (2020); LSD (2025)
	Dawn Staple		2004–2007	percussion	Sing to God (1996) – "Peril on the Sea" story; "Ditzy Scene" (2007); "Vermin Mangle" (2020)
	Adrien Rodes		2024 (Cardiacs Family)	keyboards	none
	Jane Kaye		2025–2026	vocals	LSD (2025)

==== Honorary ====
Some members of the Cardiacs crew are listed on the album liner notes of Greatest Hits (2002) alongside the other band members.

Image	Name	Role	Release contributions
	Mr Hiles (Bill Hiles)	Ordinary Shop Girl	Big Ship (1987) – technical credits only; "There's Too Many Irons in the Fire" (1987) – technical credits only; Cardiacs Live (1988) – technical credits only; On Land and in the Sea (1989) – technical credits only; All That Glitters Is a Maresnest (1992) – technical credits only
	The Consultant (James Stevens)	manager; label representative	Seaside Treats (1984) – video appearance; Big Ship (1987) – artwork and management credits only; "There's Too Many Irons in the Fire" (1987) – management credits only; A Little Man and a House and the Whole World Window (1988) – guest appearance; Cardiacs Live (1988) – artwork credits only; Archive Cardiacs (1989) – production credits only
	Miss Swift (Wendy Swift)	label representative	Seaside Treats (1984) – video appearance; A Little Man and a House and the Whole World Window (1988) – guest appearance; Archive Cardiacs (1989) – production credits only

=== Session ===
Image	Name	Years active	Instruments	Release contributions
	Tim Hills	1984	trombone	The Seaside (1984); Seaside Treats (1985)
	Mike Peters	1984	trumpet	The Seaside (1984); Seaside Treats (1985)
	Nick Pell	1984	trumpet	The Seaside (1984); Seaside Treats (1985)
	Lanze Lorrens	1984	trumpet; vocals	The Seaside (1984); Seaside Treats (1985)
	Wendy Collins	1984	vocals on "A Little Man and a House"	The Seaside (1984); Seaside Treats (1985)
	Ashley Slater	1988	trombones	A Little Man and a House and the Whole World Window (1988)
	Phil Cesar	1988	trumpets; flugelhorn	A Little Man and a House and the Whole World Window (1988)
	Elain Herman	1988	violins	A Little Man and a House and the Whole World Window (1988)
	Mr Walmesley (Mark Walmsley)	1988	vocals	A Little Man and a House and the Whole World Window (1988); Big Ship (1987) – management credits only; "There's Too Many Irons in the Fire" (1987) – management credits only; Cardiacs Live (1988) – management credits only; On Land and in the Sea (1989) – management credits only; All That Glitters Is a Maresnest (1992) – management credits only
	Natalie Box	1996	violins	Sing to God (1996)
	Jane Kyprianidis	1996	scissors	Sing to God (1996)
	Mark Barratt	1996	trumpets	Sing to God (1996)
	Chris Brierly	1996; 1999	string quartet	Sing to God (1996); Guns (1999)
	Catherine Morgan	1996; 1999	string quartet	Sing to God (1996); Guns (1999)
	Mark Pharaoh	1996; 1999	string quartet	Sing to God (1996); Guns (1999)
	Robert Woollard	1996; 1999	string quartet	Sing to God (1996); Guns (1999)
	David Murder	1996	orchestral arrangements on "Fiery Gun Hand" and "Wireless"	Sing to God (1996); All That Glitters Is a Maresnest (1992) – technical credits only; Heaven Born and Ever Bright (1992) – technical credits only; On Land and in the Sea (1995 reissue) – technical credits only
	Joanne Spratley	1999; 2021–2024	vocals on "Sleep All Eyes Open" and "Come Back Clammy Lammy" (Guns) vocals on "Skating" (LSD)	Guns (1999); LSD (2025)
	Rob Deschamps	1999	trombone; French horn	Guns (1999)
	Suzanne Kirby	2007	vocals	"Ditzy Scene" (2007); Some Fairytales from the Rotten Shed (2017) – management credits and video appearance; "Vermin Mangle" (2020); LSD (2025)
	Rose-Ellen Kemp	2021–2024	vocals	LSD (2025)
	James Larcombe	2021–2024	piano; keyboards	LSD (2025)
	Rob Crow	2021–2024	"drumfuckery"	LSD (2025)
	Nick Howiantz	2021–2024	guest voice; keyboards	LSD (2025)
	Steve Morricone	2021–2024	guest voice	LSD (2025)
	Yael Claire Shahmoon	2021–2024	guest voice	LSD (2025)
	Emily Freya Jones	2021–2024	guest voice	LSD (2025)
	Nick Howiantz	2021–2024	guest voice	LSD (2025)
	Shane Embury	2021–2024	guest voice	LSD (2025)
	Duncan 'The Honest Man' Cooper	2021–2024	guest voice	LSD (2025)
	Jon 'The Choirboy' Daniel	2021–2024	guest voice	LSD (2025)

=== Live substitute members ===
Image	Name	Years active	Instruments	Notes
	Jon Bastable	1983	bass	Bastable filled in for Jim Smith when neither he nor Tim Quy could make it to a gig. A noted gig was at the Kingston Grove Tavern on 13 July 1983.
	Stephen Gilchrist	2004	drums	Gilchrist filled in for Bob Leith, who had conflicts with Blurt, at shows supporting the Wildhearts in 2004. He also played extra drums on LSD (2025).
	Jesse Cutts	2024	bass	Cutts from Tim Smith's Spratleys filled in for Jim Smith on several tracks in the middle of a Cardiacs Family show at Brighton Concord in October 2024 after Smith had a health scare the night before.

== Lineups ==
Period	Members	Releases	Notes
Late 1977 – 1978	Tim Smith – guitar; Jim Smith – bass; Michael Pugh – vocals; Peter Tagg – drums	none	
1978 (The Filth)	Tim Smith – guitar, vocals; Jim Smith – bass; Michael Pugh – vocals; Peter Tagg – drums; Colvin Mayers – keyboards; Ralph Cade – saxophone	"A Bus for a Bus on the Bus" (1979); Cardiacs E.P. (2025) – "Aukamakic / Dead Mouse"	Cade did not feature on "Aukamakic / Dead Mouse".
1978 – 1979 (Cardiac Arrest)	Tim Smith – guitar, vocals; Jim Smith – bass; Michael Pugh – vocals; Peter Tagg – drums; Colvin Mayers – keyboards; Ralph Cade – saxophone	"A Bus for a Bus on the Bus" (1979); Cardiacs E.P. (2025) – "Aukamakic / Dead Mouse"	Cade did not feature on "Aukamakic / Dead Mouse".
July 1979 – June 1980 (Cardiac Arrest)	Tim Smith – guitar, vocals; Jim Smith – bass; Michael Pugh – vocals; Colvin Mayers – keyboards; Mark Cawthra – drums, vocals	The Obvious Identity (1980)	Pugh only features on two tracks from The Obvious Identity
July 1979 – June 1980 (Cardiac Arrest)	Tim Smith – guitar, vocals; Jim Smith – bass; Colvin Mayers – keyboards; Mark Cawthra – drums, vocals	The Obvious Identity (1980)	Pugh only features on two tracks from The Obvious Identity
1980 – 1981	Tim Smith – guitar, keyboards, vocals; Jim Smith – bass, vocals; Colvin Mayers – keyboards; Mark Cawthra – drums, vocals; Sarah Cutts – keyboards, saxophone, vocals	Toy World (1981)	Mayers only features on four tracks from Toy World
1981	Tim Smith – guitar, keyboards, vocals; Jim Smith – bass, vocals; Mark Cawthra – drums, vocals; Sarah Cutts – keyboards, saxophone, vocals	Toy World (1981)	Mayers only features on four tracks from Toy World
1981–1982	Tim Smith – guitar, keyboards, vocals; Jim Smith – bass, vocals; Mark Cawthra – drums, vocals; Sarah Cutts – keyboards, saxophone, vocals; Tim Quy – percussion	none	
1982–1983	Tim Smith – guitar, keyboards, vocals; Jim Smith – bass, vocals; Mark Cawthra – keyboards, vocals; Sarah Cutts – saxophone, vocals; Tim Quy – percussion; Dominic Luckman – drums	The Seaside (1984); Seaside Treats (1985)	Cawthra featured on tracks recorded prior to his absence.
1983	Tim Smith – guitar, vocals; Jim Smith – bass, vocals; Sarah Smith – saxophone; Tim Quy – percussion; Dominic Luckman – drums; William D. Drake – keyboards	The Seaside (1984); Seaside Treats (1985)	Cawthra featured on tracks recorded prior to his absence.
1983	Tim Smith – guitar, vocals; Jim Smith – bass, vocals; Sarah Smith – saxophone; Tim Quy – percussion; Dominic Luckman – drums; William D. Drake – keyboards; Graham Simmonds – guitar	The Seaside (1984); Seaside Treats (1985)	Cawthra featured on tracks recorded prior to his absence.
31 August 1983 – 10 July 1984	Tim Smith – guitar, vocals; Jim Smith – bass, vocals; Sarah Smith – saxophone; Tim Quy – percussion; Dominic Luckman – drums; William D. Drake – keyboards; Graham Simmonds – guitar; Marguerite Johnston – saxophone	The Seaside (1984); Seaside Treats (1985)	Cawthra featured on tracks recorded prior to his absence.
11 July 1984 – 13 August 1984	Tim Smith – guitar, vocals; Jim Smith – bass, vocals; Sarah Smith – saxophone; Tim Quy – percussion; Dominic Luckman – drums; William D. Drake – keyboards; Marguerite Johnston – saxophone	none	
14 August 1984 – 11 February 1989	Tim Smith – guitar, vocals; Jim Smith – bass, vocals; Sarah Smith – saxophone, vocals; Tim Quy – percussion, keyboards; Dominic Luckman – drums; William D. Drake – keyboards, vocals	Rude Bootleg (1986); Big Ship (1987); "There's Too Many Irons in the Fire" (1987); A Little Man and a House and the Whole World Window (1988); "Susannah's Still Alive" (1988); Radio 1 Sessions / The Evening Show (1988); Cardiacs Live (1988); On Land and in the Sea (1989); "Everything Is Easy" (1991)	
1989 – 30 June 1990	Tim Smith – guitar, vocals; Jim Smith – bass, vocals; Tim Quy – percussion, keyboards; Dominic Luckman – drums; William D. Drake – keyboards, vocals; Christian Hayes – guitar, vocals	All That Glitters Is a Mares Nest (1995)	Sarah Smith appeared as a guest musician.
31 June 1990 – 16 May 1991	Tim Smith – guitar, vocals; Jim Smith – bass, vocals; Dominic Luckman – drums; William D. Drake – keyboards, vocals; Christian Hayes – guitar, vocals	none	
c. 17 May 1991 – 1991	Tim Smith – guitar, vocals; Jim Smith – bass, vocals; Dominic Luckman – drums; Christian Hayes – guitar, vocals	"Day Is Gone" (1991); Heaven Born and Ever Bright (1992)	Hayes features on the recordings throughout, whereas Poole joined during the mixing stage and is featured on the packaging, the "Day Is Gone" music video, and the tour dates
1991	Tim Smith – guitar, vocals; Jim Smith – bass, vocals; Dominic Luckman – drums	"Day Is Gone" (1991); Heaven Born and Ever Bright (1992)	Hayes features on the recordings throughout, whereas Poole joined during the mixing stage and is featured on the packaging, the "Day Is Gone" music video, and the tour dates
21 October 1991 – 20 July 1993	Tim Smith – guitar, vocals; Jim Smith – bass, vocals; Dominic Luckman – drums; Jon Poole – guitar, keyboards, vocals	"Day Is Gone" (1991); Heaven Born and Ever Bright (1992)	Hayes features on the recordings throughout, whereas Poole joined during the mixing stage and is featured on the packaging, the "Day Is Gone" music video, and the tour dates
2 December 1993 – 16 October 2003	Tim Smith – guitar, vocals; Jim Smith – bass, vocals; Jon Poole – guitar, keyboards, vocals; Bob Leith – drums	Sing to God (1996); Guns (1999); "Faster Than Snakes with a Ball and a Chain" (2002)	
17 October 2003 – 2004	Tim Smith – guitar, vocals; Jim Smith – bass, vocals; Bob Leith – drums; Kavus Torabi – guitar, vocals	The Special Garage Concerts (2005); Some Fairytales from the Rotten Shed (2017)	
2004–2007	Tim Smith – guitar, vocals; Jim Smith – bass, vocals; Bob Leith – drums; Kavus Torabi – guitar, vocals; Sharron Fortnam – vocals; Cathy Harabaras – percussion; Claire Lemmon – vocals; Dawn Staple – percussion; Melanie Woods – vocals	"Ditzy Scene" (2007)	Sharron Fortnam did not feature on "Ditzy Scene".
2007–2008	Tim Smith – guitar, vocals; Jim Smith – bass, vocals; Bob Leith – drums; Kavus Torabi – guitar, vocals; Cathy Harabaras – percussion, vocals; Melanie Woods – vocals, percussion		
2024 shows as Cardiacs Family	Jim Smith – bass, vocals; Christian Hayes – guitar, lead vocals; Jon Poole – guitar, lead vocals; Bob Leith – drums; Craig Fortnam – percussion; Chloe Herington – saxophone; Adrien Rodes – keyboard		
2025	Jim Smith – bass, vocals; Bob Leith – drums, vocals; Kavus Torabi – guitar, vocals; Sharron Fortnam – vocals; Craig Fortnam – percussion, glockenspiel, vocals; Chloe Herington – saxophone; Jane Kaye – vocals; Mike Vennart – lead vocals	LSD (2025)	Herington does not feature on LSD. Despite this, the 2025 lineup has also been called the LSD lineup.
c. 2025–2026	Jim Smith – bass, vocals; Bob Leith – drums, vocals; Kavus Torabi – guitar, vocals; Sharron Fortnam – vocals; Craig Fortnam – percussion, glockenspiel, vocals; Chloe Herington – saxophone; Jane Kaye – vocals; Mike Vennart – lead vocals, guitar; Rhodri Marsden – keyboards		
2026	Jim Smith – bass, vocals; Bob Leith – drums, vocals; Kavus Torabi – guitar, vocals; Sharron Fortnam – vocals; Craig Fortnam – percussion, vocals, keyboards, acoustic guitar; Chloe Herington – saxophone, vocals; Mike Vennart – lead vocals, guitar; Rhodri Marsden – keyboards, vocals		

Listed by role
Years	Guitar/ Keys	Lead Vocals	Bass	Drums	Guitar 2	Keys 2	Woodwind		Vocals	Percussion		Vocals		Releases
1977–1978	Tim Smith	Mick Pugh	Jim Smith	Peter Tagg										
1978–1979	T. Smith	Mick	J. Smith	Tagg		Colvin Mayers	Ralph Cade							"A Bus for a Bus on the Bus" (1979); Cardiacs E.P. (2025) – "Aukamakic / Dead Mouse"
1979–1980	T. Smith	Mick	J. Smith	Mark Cawthra		Mayers								The Obvious Identity (1980)
1979–1980	T. Smith		J. Smith	Cawthra		Mayers								The Obvious Identity (1980)
1980–1981	T. Smith		J. Smith	Cawthra		Mayers	Sarah Cutts							Toy World (1981)
1980–1981	T. Smith		J. Smith	Cawthra		Cutts								Toy World (1981)
1981–1982	T. Smith		J. Smith	Cawthra		Sarah Smith				Tim Quy				The Seaside (1984); Seaside Treats (1985)
1982–1983	T. Smith		J. Smith	Dominic Luckman		Cawthra	S. Smith			Quy				The Seaside (1984); Seaside Treats (1985)
1983	T. Smith		J. Smith	Luckman		William D. Drake	S. Smith			Quy				The Seaside (1984); Seaside Treats (1985)
1983	T. Smith		J. Smith	Luckman	Graham Simmonds	Drake	S. Smith			Quy				The Seaside (1984); Seaside Treats (1985)
1983–1984	T. Smith		J. Smith	Luckman	Simmonds	Drake	S. Smith	Marguerite Johnston		Quy				The Seaside (1984); Seaside Treats (1985)
1984	T. Smith		J. Smith	Luckman		Drake	S. Smith	Johnston		Quy				The Seaside (1984); Seaside Treats (1985)
1984–1989	T. Smith		J. Smith	Luckman		Drake	S. Smith			Quy				Rude Bootleg (1986); Big Ship (1987); "There's Too Many Irons" (1987); A Little Man and a House (1988); "Susannah's Still Alive" (1988); Radio 1 Sessions (1988); Cardiacs Live (1988); On Land and in the Sea (1989); "Everything Is Easy" (1991)
1989–1990	T. Smith		J. Smith	Luckman	Christian Hayes	Drake				Quy				All That Glitters Is a Mares Nest (1995)
1990–1991	T. Smith		J. Smith	Luckman	Hayes	Drake								
1991	T. Smith		J. Smith	Luckman	Hayes									"Day Is Gone" (1991)
1991	T. Smith		J. Smith	Luckman										
1991–1993	T. Smith		J. Smith	Luckman	Jon Poole									Heaven Born and Ever Bright (1992)
1993– 2003	T. Smith		J. Smith	Bob Leith	Poole									Sing to God (1996); Guns (1999); "Faster Than Snakes with a Ball and a Chain" (2002)
2003–2004	T. Smith		J. Smith	Leith	Kavus Torabi									The Special Garage Concerts (2005); Some Fairytales from the Rotten Shed (2017)
2004–2007	T. Smith		J. Smith	Leith	Torabi				Melanie Woods	Dawn Staple	Cathy Harabaras	Claire Lemmon	Sharron Fortnam	
2007	T. Smith		J. Smith	Leith	Torabi				Woods	Staple	Harabaras	Lemmon		"Ditzy Scene" (2007)
2007–2008	T. Smith		J. Smith	Leith	Torabi				Woods		Harabaras			
2024 (Sing to Tim)	Poole		J. Smith	Leith	Hayes	Adrien Rodes	Chloe Herington			Craig Fortnam				
2025		Mike Vennart	J. Smith	Leith	Torabi		Chloe Herington		Jane Kaye	Craig Fortnam			S.Fortnam	LSD (2025)
2025	Vennart		J. Smith	Leith	Torabi	Rhodri Marsden	Herington		Kaye	C. Fortnam			S. Fortnam	
