= Elizabeth Bennett =

Elizabeth Bennet(t) may refer to:

- Elizabeth Bennet (married name Darcy), the protagonist of Jane Austen's novel, Pride and Prejudice
- Elisabeth Bennett, British archivist
- Elizabeth Bennett (d. 1582), an alleged witch
- Elizabeth Bennett (stage actress) (1714–1791), British stage actress
- Elizabeth Bennett (judge), Canadian judge
- Elizabeth Bennett (actress) (born 1944), English television actress
- Elizabeth Ann Bennett (born 1978), American television actress

== See also ==
- Eliza Bennett (born 1992), English actress and singer
- Betty T. Bennett (1935–2006), American professor of literature
