= Chessington =

Coordinates: 51.3635°N 0.2998°W

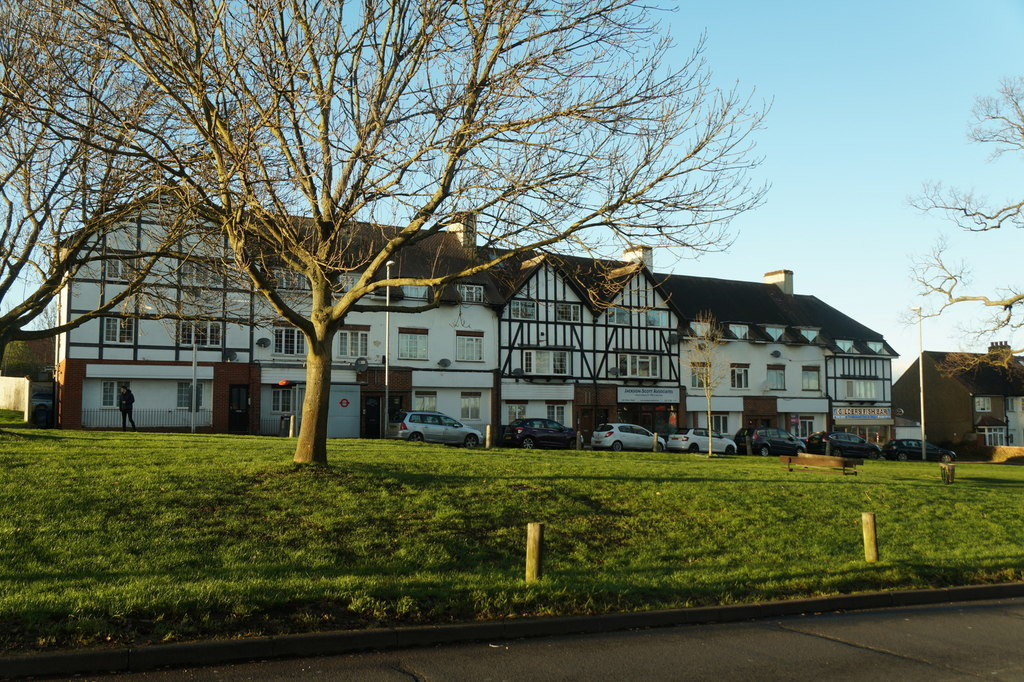
- Gilders Road, Chessington

- Location within Greater London
- Population: 18,973 (Chessington North and Hook and Chessington South wards 2011)
- OS grid reference: TQ183641
- London borough: Kingston
- Ceremonial county: Greater London
- Region: London
- Country: England
- Sovereign state: United Kingdom
- Post town: CHESSINGTON
- Postcode district: KT9
- Dialling code: 020
- Police: Metropolitan
- Fire: London
- Ambulance: London
- UK Parliament: Kingston and Surbiton
- London Assembly: South West

Chessington is an area in the Royal Borough of Kingston upon Thames within Greater London, which was historically part of Surrey. At the 2011 census it had a population of 18,973. The Bonesgate Stream, a tributary of the Hogsmill River, runs through it. The popular theme park resort Chessington World of Adventures, which incorporates Chessington Zoo, is located in the south-west of the area.

Neighbouring settlements include Tolworth, Ewell, Surbiton, Claygate, Epsom, Oxshott, Leatherhead, Esher, Kingston upon Thames, Worcester Park and Malden Rushett.

== History ==
Its name came from Anglo-Saxon Cissan dūn = "hill belonging to [a man named] Cissa".

Chessington appears in the Domesday Book of 1086 as Cisedune and Cisendone. It was held partly by Robert de Wateville and partly by Milo (Miles) Crispin. Its Domesday assets were: 1½ hides; part of a mill worth 2s, 4 ploughs, woodland worth 30 hogs. It rendered £7.

The mansion at Chessington World of Adventures, known today as the Burnt Stub, was originally built in 1348. In the English Civil War it became a royalist stronghold and was razed to the ground by Oliver Cromwell's Parliamentary forces, giving it its modern name. The site became an inn and was then rebuilt on a grander scale from the 18th century by the Vere Barker family in a Neo-Gothic Victorian style. The grounds were turned into a zoo in 1931 by Reginald Goddard. Chessington Zoo became part of the Tussauds Group in 1978 and is now operated as a theme park. Burnt Stub had no public access until 2003 when it became an attraction called Hocus Pocus Hall.

Map of Chessington in the 1880s

Chessington Hall has a place in 18th-century literary history, as home of Samuel Crisp, a failed playwright and close friend of Fanny Burney. Chessington Road Recreation Ground was purchased on 16 October 1930 for £1,000.

On 1 April 1965 the civil parish was abolished. At the 1951 census (the last before the abolition of the parish), Chessington had a population of 9194.

At 207 Hook Road is a Blue plaque commemorating the author Enid Blyton, who lived at the address between 1920 and 1924.

The former farmhouse Barwell Court (on Barwell Lane) was used as a recording and residential studio during the 1970s through to the 1990s.

The former RAF Chessington Hospital, demolished in the 1990s, first opened as RAF Hook around 1938 as a regional barrage balloon depot and was operated by RAF Balloon Command. It became a vital part of Britain's defence against the Luftwaffe in World War II, and originally featured a number of large barrage balloon sheds as well as extensive garages and workshops for the station's support vehicles.

== Notable residents ==
- Enid Blyton, author of Noddy, the Secret Seven and the Famous Five, lived at 207, Hook Road.
- Sir Jack Brabham, Australian Formula 1 World Champion owned a house which he sometimes lived in, opposite the garage he owned.
- Jan Brittin, England cricketer
- Helen Chamberlain, TV presenter
- Petula Clark, singer from the 1960s
- George Cohen, member of the 1966 England World Cup-winning team.
- Jimmy Conway, Fulham & Republic of Ireland footballer, lived on Leatherhead Road, until 1976.
- Samuel Crisp, dramatist in the 1700s, lived in Chessington Hall.
- Chris Garland, Chelsea footballer, for a few years in early 1970s.
- Bob Geldof lived at Barwell Court for two years in the late 1970s along with members of his band The Boomtown Rats and TV presenter girlfriend Paula Yates. Previous occupants of the house were the progressive rock bands Genesis (who wrote their album Selling England by the Pound whilst staying there in 1973), Van Der Graaf Generator and Gong. A subsequent inhabitant and manager of Barwell Court was bass guitarist John Giblin (also known for his work with Simple Minds, John Martyn, Kate Bush and others).
- Harry Hawker, well known engineer, test pilot and racing driver, lived in Hook until 1921.
- Kelly Reilly, actress, in US TV series Yellowstone
- Errol Brown, singer in Hot Chocolate
- Tim Smith and Jim Smith (respectively singer/guitarist/composer and bass guitarist/backing singer in Cardiacs) grew up in Chessington.
- Paul Darrow, actor, Kerr Avon from Blakes 7. Born in Chessington

== Economy ==
Sega Amusements Europe has its head office in Chessington.

The Chessington Industrial Estate is located on Lion Park Avenue.

== Attractions ==
Chessington houses one of Europe's leading theme park resorts Chessington World of Adventures. This includes a zoo, a theme park, an aquarium and two four star hotels – the Safari Hotel and Azteca Hotel. In the grounds of the resort lies the historic Burnt Stub Mansion.

Chessington Garden Centre is located in the south of the area near Malden Rushett.

Chessington offers a range of countryside activities with many open spaces including the "Chessington Countryside Walk" in the London Green Belt. Chessington Wood, in the south of the area, contains the source of the Bonesgate Stream, a tributary of the Hogsmill River, in turn a tributary of the River Thames.

== Locality ==
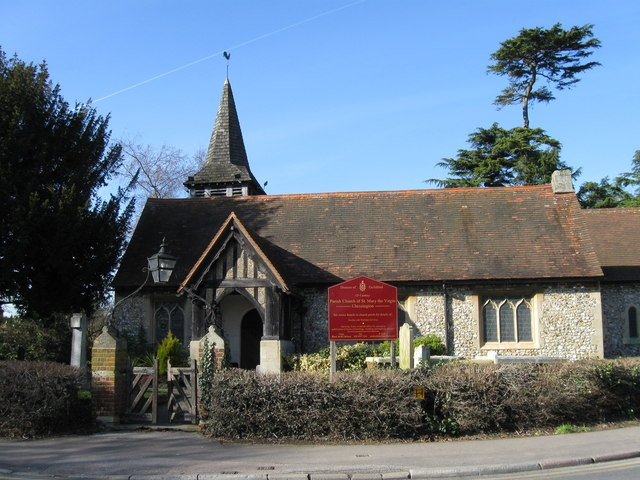
St Mary's Church, Chessington

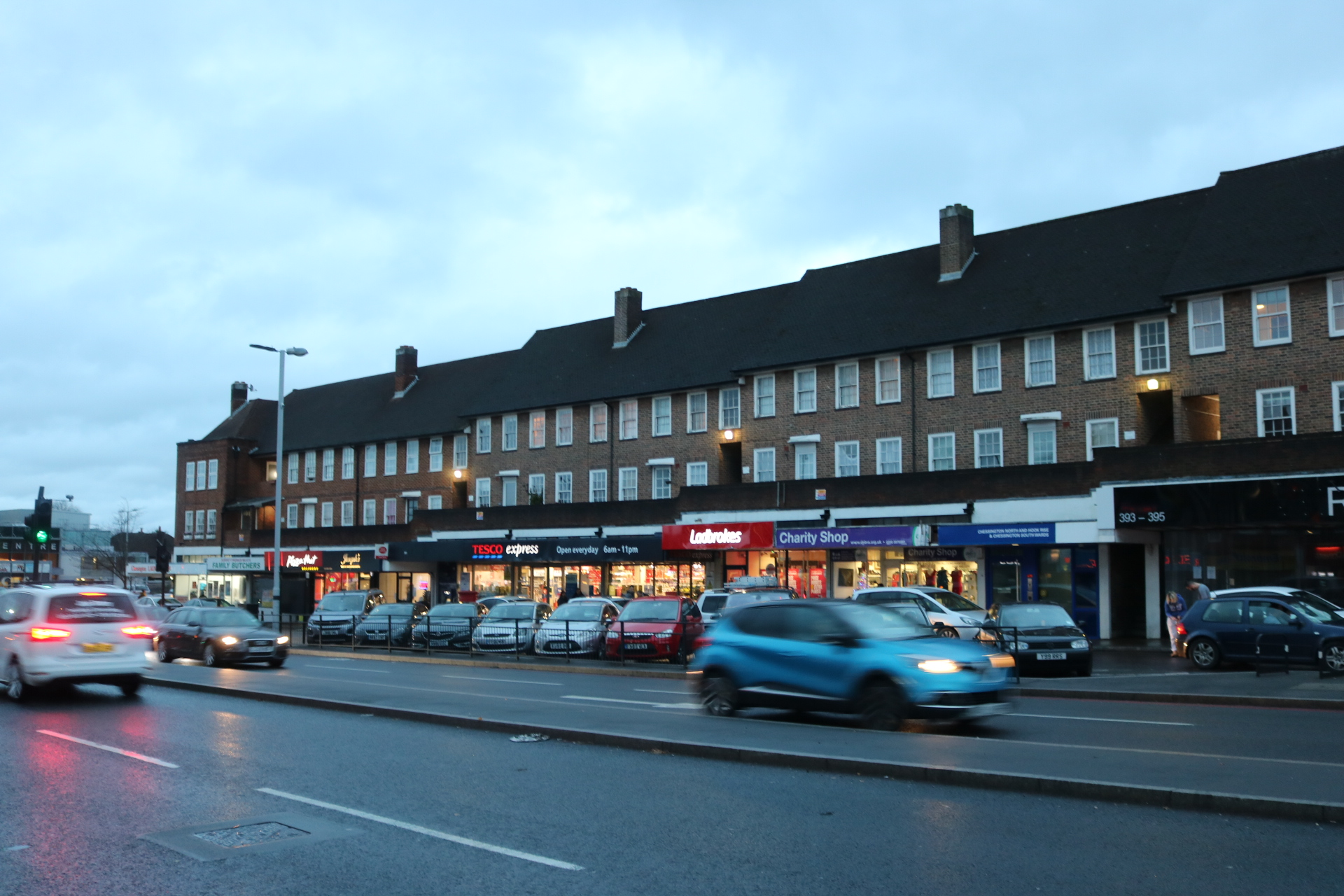
Hook Road, Chessington

The areas of Chessington have these names:

- Chessington North, also referred to as North Parade, immediately adjacent to Chessington North railway station.
- Hook, generally referred to as the central point in Chessington, although historically considered a separate entity.
- Copt Gilders, named after the farm which was once in this area.
- Chessington South, previously called Fleetwood, incorporating the majority of buildings south of Chessington School and Chessington South railway station.
- Southborough is close to the A3 and nearby Surbiton and Tolworth.
- The Ace of Spades, the area surrounding the roundabout linking Hook Road with the A3/Kingston Bypass.

Chessington World of Adventures (branded, is often referred to simply as "Chessington"), a zoo and theme park with a broader appeal. Within the park there is the Burnt Stub Mansion from the English Civil War. Also one of the main employers in the area.

Churches include: St Paul's Church, Hook Road, in the Diocese of Southwark; St Mary's Church, Church Lane, in the Diocese of Guildford; Chessington Methodist Church, Moor Lane, in the Kingston circuit; St. Catherine of Siena Roman Catholic Church, Leatherhead Road, in the Roman Catholic Archdiocese of Southwark; and Chessington Evangelical Church, the King's Centre, Coppard Gardens.

The town is served by the Surrey Comet newspaper, and up to 2016 had the former free paper Kingston Guardian.

=== Sport ===
Within the town there are various sporting organisations including: Non League football clubs Chessington & Hook United F.C. and Epsom Athletic F.C., who both play football in the Combined Counties League; and Kingston RFC based on the Hook Road. Kingston RFC play in Surrey division 2 union league. Chessington also is home to Chessington Cricket Club, founded in 1919, play on the Sir Francis Barker recreation ground on Leatherhead Road, the 1st XI currently play in Division 1 of The Surrey Championship.

On site with Chessington School is Chessington Sports Centre. The sports centre is home to many local sports clubs such as The Kingston Wildcats (2nd and youth teams), Genesis Gymnastics Club, Chessington Badminton Club and many others. The Sports Centre has a multi use sports hall, a fully equipped fitness suite and Kingston's only Climbing Wall, Chessington Rocks.

The former Formula One racing team Brabham had their factory in Chessington. The site is now occupied by the Carlin DPR GP2 team.

== Education ==
The main secondary school in Chessington is a mixed public school called Chessington School, but nearby secondary schools on the northern border of Chessington are the boys' school Southborough High School in Surbiton and Tolworth Girls' School and Centre for Continuing Education in Tolworth.

There are also many primary schools, e.g., Lovelace Primary, Ellingham Primary School.

== Transport ==
There are trains, buses and taxis.

=== Rail ===
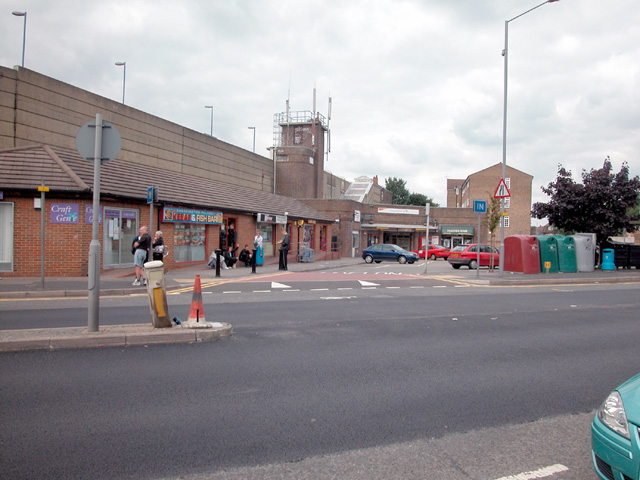
Chessington North railway station

Chessington has two railway stations: Chessington North and Chessington South. They are half a mile apart with South Western Railway services every half-hour to London Waterloo. Chessington South is the end of the line.

The line past Chessington South has fallen into heavy disrepair and leads over a concrete bridge into a patch of full-grown trees. The crossover, signal, and rail electricity at this point are still active, even though a passenger train has never passed over this section.

=== Roads ===
Chessington is about four miles (6 km) from junction 9 of the M25 motorway. The town is situated on the A243 Leatherhead Road, close to the A3 London-to-Portsmouth trunk route to the north. The un-numbered Bridge Road runs through the area from the A243 toward the adjacent district of West Ewell, in the neighbouring borough of Epsom and Ewell (the boundary being marked crossing the course of the Bonesgate Stream).

=== Buses ===
The Chessington area is served by a number of daily bus services, such as routes 71, 465, 467, night route 65 and local routes K2 and K4. It is also served by the school service 671.
