= Chessington School =

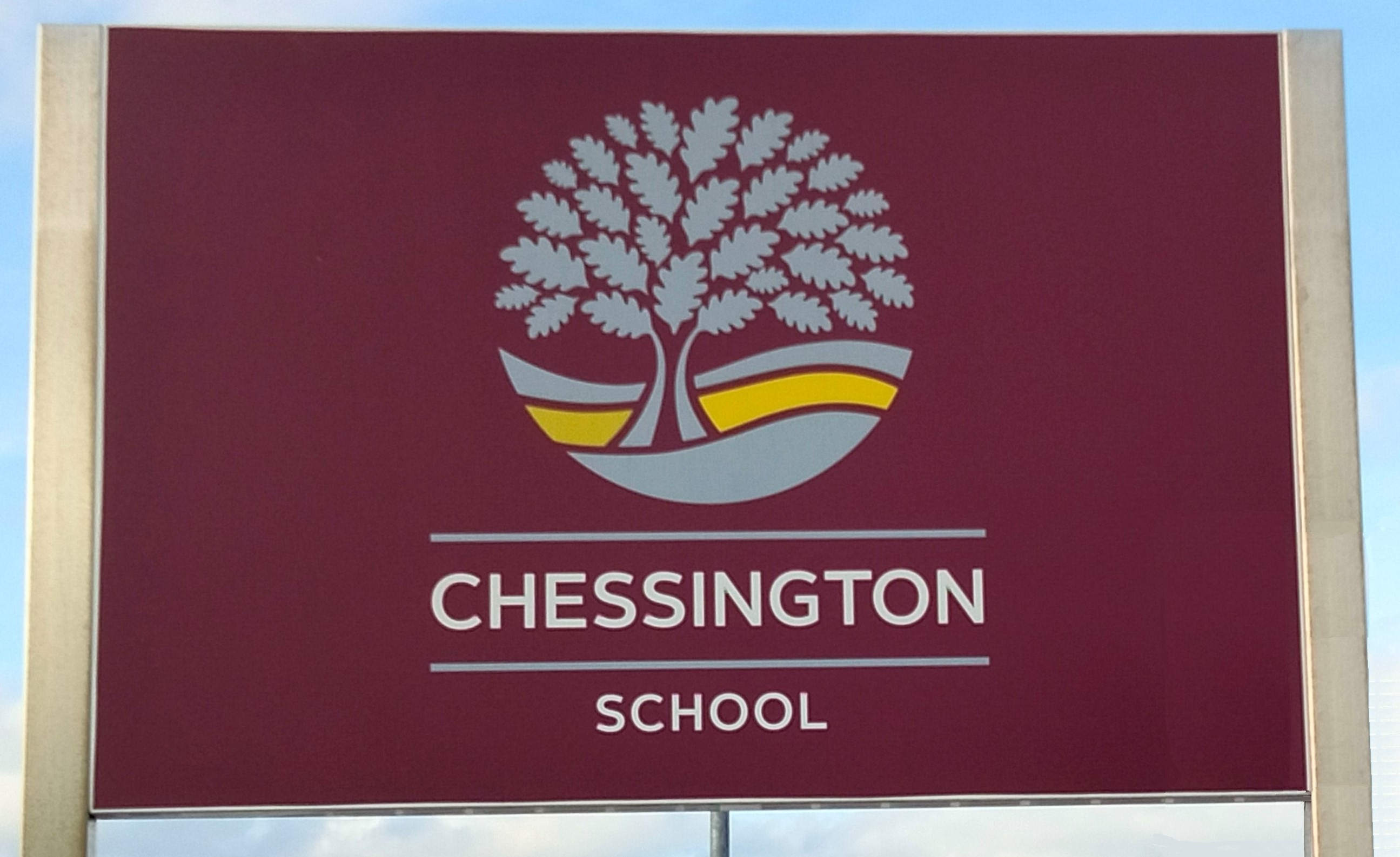
- School sign board showing school badge

Location
- Garrison Lane; Chessington, London, KT9; England; 51.357°N 0.309°W

Information
- Type: Academy
- Established: 1989
- Local authority: Kingston upon Thames
- Department for Education URN: 148407 Tables
- Ofsted: Reports
- Head teacher: Sarah Wilson
- Gender: Co-educational
- Age: 11 to 16
- Enrolment: 746
- Website: chessington.kingston.sch.uk

Chessington School (formerly Chessington Community College until September 2018) is a co-educational secondary school with a sports centre, in the Royal Borough of Kingston upon Thames, Greater London. The current building was opened in September 2009.

== History ==
=== Pre-Chessington Community College ===
In 1939, the Garrison Lane site of Chessington School was opened as RAF Chessington and was used as a barrage balloon centre in the defence of London in World War II. After a brief period of operation as a US Air Force base, most of the land was sold off for housing; however some of the land was still under military ownership as recently as the mid 1990s.

The first secondary school in the Chessington area was Moor Lane secondary mixed school, opened in 1936. After World War II, with large areas of Chessington scheduled for building, a new secondary school was required. It was decided to retain Moor Lane as a secondary girls' school, and establish a new boys' school. In September 1953, Fleetwood County Secondary boys' school was opened in Garrison Lane as a three-form entry school with a roll of 324 boys.

As house building in the area progressed, boys of all ages were continually being admitted to Fleetwood, increasing pressure on the school organisation, and in some cases resulting in boys of different age groups being taught in the same classes. The school soon became overcrowded, accentuated by some classes with over 40 boys housed in classrooms intended for 30. This situation was relieved in 1958 by the addition of two classrooms and a library. In time, new house building slowed and the annual intakes reduced to the normal three-form entry and forms were reduced in size, with no form more than 35, most being just below 30.

A Ministry of Education inspection in July 1962 concluded that Fleetwood was a good school which made a valuable contribution to its local community. Under the Surrey Development Plan for Secondary Education, girls were admitted to the renamed Fleetwood County Secondary School, with the first girls admitted in September 1962 when 38 girls joined the existing 383 boys. In the following years, numbers began to rise as more girls joined the school.

The 1980s saw falling rolls, and Kingston Local Education Authority considered closing the school. This angered many of the parents and residents in the Chessington and Hook areas who felt that local amenities were being taken away from the south of the borough. Following local debate, Kingston decided to keep the secondary school in the south of the borough, but given the complaints about lack of recreational facilities decided that a new educational establishment was needed which would also serve the community needs of Chessington and Hook.

=== Chessington Community College ===
In September 1989, Chessington Community College was established, replacing Fleetwood School on the Garrison Lane site, with Mr. J. P. Hayes as its first headteacher.

In 1992, the College opened a £2 million sports centre which was built not only to provide indoor sporting facilities for the pupils of Chessington Community College, but also to serve the sporting needs of the local community in the evenings and at weekends.

The College progressed well under the headship of Hayes, with the percentage of Year 11 pupils gaining 5 A* – C GCSEs rising from 19% in summer 1990 to nearly 50% in summer 1995.

In 2009, following years of construction as part of the Building Schools for the Future programme, the college reopened following a rebuild worth £17 million.

In September 2018 the college was renamed Chessington School, a name chosen by its students.

=== Academy status ===
Previously a community school administered by Kingston upon Thames London Borough Council, in April 2021 Chessington School converted to academy status. The school is now sponsored by the Every Child, Every Day Academy Trust.

== Ofsted Report ==
The last full Ofsted inspection of Chessington Community College in November 2014 gave a "Good" rating, in comparison to a previous "Requires Improvement" rating in December 2012. The "Good" rating was confirmed after a short inspection in May 2018.

| Inspection Dates | Ofsted Overall Effectiveness |
|---|---|
| 6/7 November 2014 | 2 – Good |
| 12/13 December 2012 | 3 – Requires Improvement |
| 10/11 February 2011 | 3 – Satisfactory |
| 16/17 January 2008 | 3 – Satisfactory |
| 9/12 February 2004 | N/A |

== Academic performance ==
Chessington Community College was given a Secondary (key stage 4) performance rating of 0.36 for 2016, this put the school in the top 25% of English schools in terms of academic progress for pupils between Key Stage 2 and Key Stage 4.

Key data from 2016 performance for Chessington Community College
| Metric | School | England Average Score |
|---|---|---|
| Attainment 8 score | 51.1 | 48.5 |
| Pupils achieving Grade C or better in English and maths GCSEs | 67% | 59.3% |
| Pupils entering for the English Baccalaureate | 40% | 36.8% |

=== GCSE results 2016 ===
In 2016 Chessington Community College achieved their best ever GCSE results, with 67% of children achieving Grade C or better, 7.7% above the England average.

=== GCSE results 2015 ===
In 2015 Chessington Community College achieved the following GCSE results

- 50% of students achieved 5 or more GCSEs at grade C or above including maths and English
- 94.93% of students achieved 5 or more GCSEs at grades A–G (91.3% incl EM)
- 97.83% of students achieved 1 or more GCSEs at grades A–G

=== GCSE results 2014 ===
In 2014 63 per cent of Chessington Community College pupils had achieved five A*–C grades

== Headteachers ==
- September 1989 to 1997 – Mr. J. P. Hayes
- 1997 to September 2002 – Mr. J.P. Allen
- September 2002 to September 2009 – Mr. D. Kemp
- September 2009 to September 2015 – Mr Rob Niedermaier-Reed
- September 2015 to ? – Ash Ali
- As of 2024 - Sarah Wilson

== The building ==
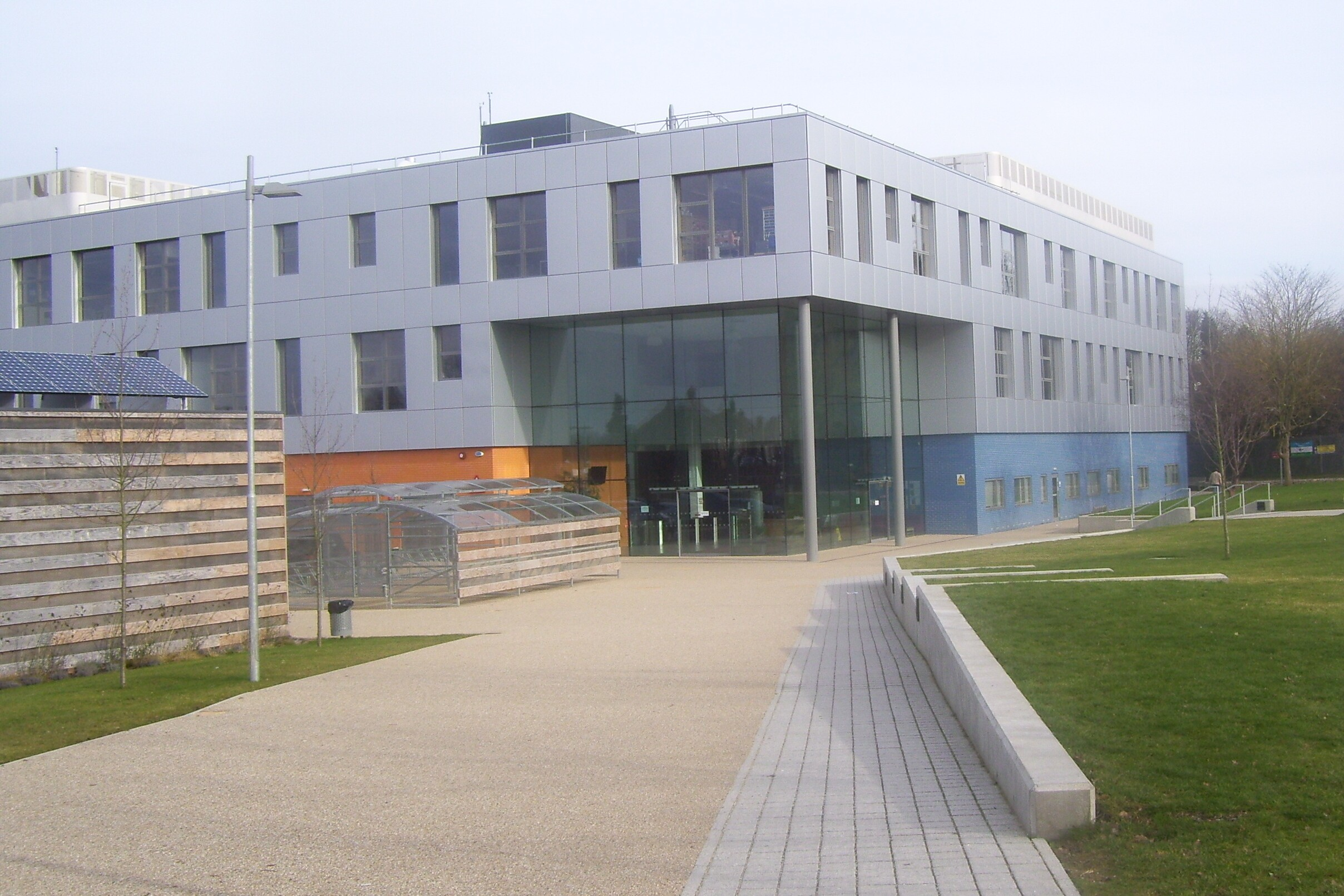
Chessington Community College – New Building post 2009

In 2006, Chessington Community College became a Building Schools for the Future Pathfinder School and received a £27m grant for a complete rebuild of the school. The new building was designed by IID Architects and was designed with energy efficiency in mind and includes MVHR (Mechanical Ventilation with Heat Recovery), a biomass boiler, photovoltaic panels and rain water harvesting. The building won the prestigious Community Benefit Award at the 2010 RICS Awards London. The construction of the school was project managed by Tuffin Ferraby Taylor.

The building achieved a BREEAM Excellent rating due to the energy efficient design.

Due to its architectural significance and design, the school building features in the Getty Image library. Chessington Community College Pictures and Photos - Getty Images

The building was officially opened in September 2009.

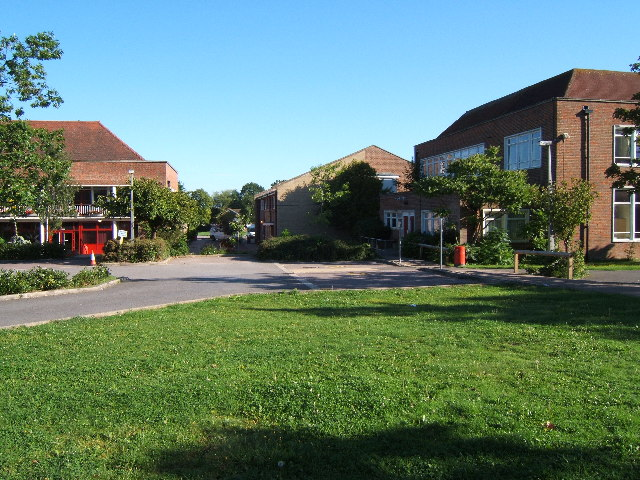
Chessington Community College Pre 2009

=== Chessington Sports Centre ===
Chessington Sports Centre has a large multi purpose sports hall, including floodlighting and astro-turf, and can be used for sports by both students and the public. The school's sports college status means it is a benchmark for the provision of sports teaching in the borough, and the school often leads and hosts sporting events, including football and netball competitions. The status also means the school gets more funding for sports facilities.

== Notable alumni ==
- Rhammel Afflick, writer and activist
- Mark Cawthra, musician and record producer
- Allan Mustafa, musician and actor
- Tim Smith, musician and record producer
- Peter Tagg, musician
