= St Mary the Virgin's Church, Chessington =

Church in Chessington, Greater London, England

Coordinates: 51°21′29″N 0°18′00″W

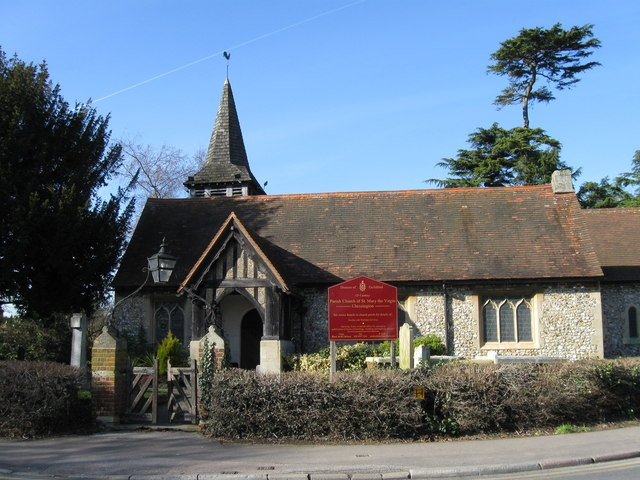
St Mary's Church, Chessington

St Mary the Virgin's Church, Chessington is a Grade II listed building, in Church Lane, Chessington, in the Royal Borough of Kingston upon Thames within Greater London. It is in the Diocese of Guildford. It became a separate parish from St John the Baptist, Old Malden, in 1939.

== History ==
The oldest part of the church is the Chancel and north wall, which dates from the twelfth century. The original Chapel of Ease in Chissendon is first mentioned in the Merton Priory Records of 1174 to 1189. The building was restored by Hesketh and reopened in 1854. It was lengthened to create the west end, the shingle spire was added, and the exterior was covered with undressed flint. During the restoration, the date 1636 was found when the plaster ceiling was removed, exposing the old chestnut roof. The Chancel Arch was built, and the vestry was added to the north. The square woodened framed windows were filled in, and the early English arches and Early English lancet windows were restored. The south aisle was added in 1870 by Jackson. The beams in the chancel are probably medieval, while those in the nave are nineteenth century apart from the four nearest the chancel, which are seventeenth century. The doorway in the north wall leading to the vestry is probably original and is fitted with a 14th-century wooden door that originally came from Winchester Cathedral.

There are small crosses scratched into the stonework in the chancel by the priest's door and on the south wall, possibly by crusaders. Also in the chancel is a Nottingham alabaster Annunciation panel (c 1376), probably part of three panels. The moulded base of the font is 13th-century. There are eight bells in the spire, cast by John Warner & Sons in 1894.

== Stained-glass windows ==
There are two windows by C. E. Kempe & Co. from the period when the company was under the chairmanship of Kempe's younger distant cousin, Walter Earnest Tower (1873–1955); they bear the "signature" of a small black tower. On the north side of the nave, the narrow lancet window is original, and the stained glass is by Kempe, dated 1912. The two-light "George Chancellor" memorial window on the west end is also by Kempe (1923).

There are two windows by Clayton and Bell. On the south side of the nave, the three-light window is c 1900. In the chancel on the south side, the "Good Shepherd" window is dated 1861.

South window "Faith, Charity, Hope" is by William Morris & Co. (c 1918), designed by Dearle from designs by Burne-Jones. It is dedicated to Arthur de Vere Vere, who died in 1916 (although the inscription has the date 1917) and who is buried in the churchyard.

There are antique stained-glass medallions in the West window (1854); the two quatrefoils are 17th-century Dutch glass, and the others are 16th-century Flemish glass.

The maker of the window in the nave, west end, south side, is unknown.

== Monuments ==
There is a monument to the playwright Samuel Crisp (1707–1783) who lived at Chessington Hall, which was sold in 1913 and later demolished. He was a friend of the 18th-century novelist and diarist Fanny Burney who wrote the epitaph.

The angel lectern "Phoebe" (1898) in the south aisle was given in memory of Gordon Wyatt Clark (1822–1897), High Sheriff of Surrey in 1873 and Deputy Lieutenant of Surrey in 1890.

There is a small Elizabethan silver Communion Chalice, one of the smallest in the country, being only 9 centimetres high. It bears the date 1568 and the mark of its London maker. It is currently exhibited in the Victoria and Albert Museum.

The churchyard contains the graves of 9 war dead.

== Gallery ==
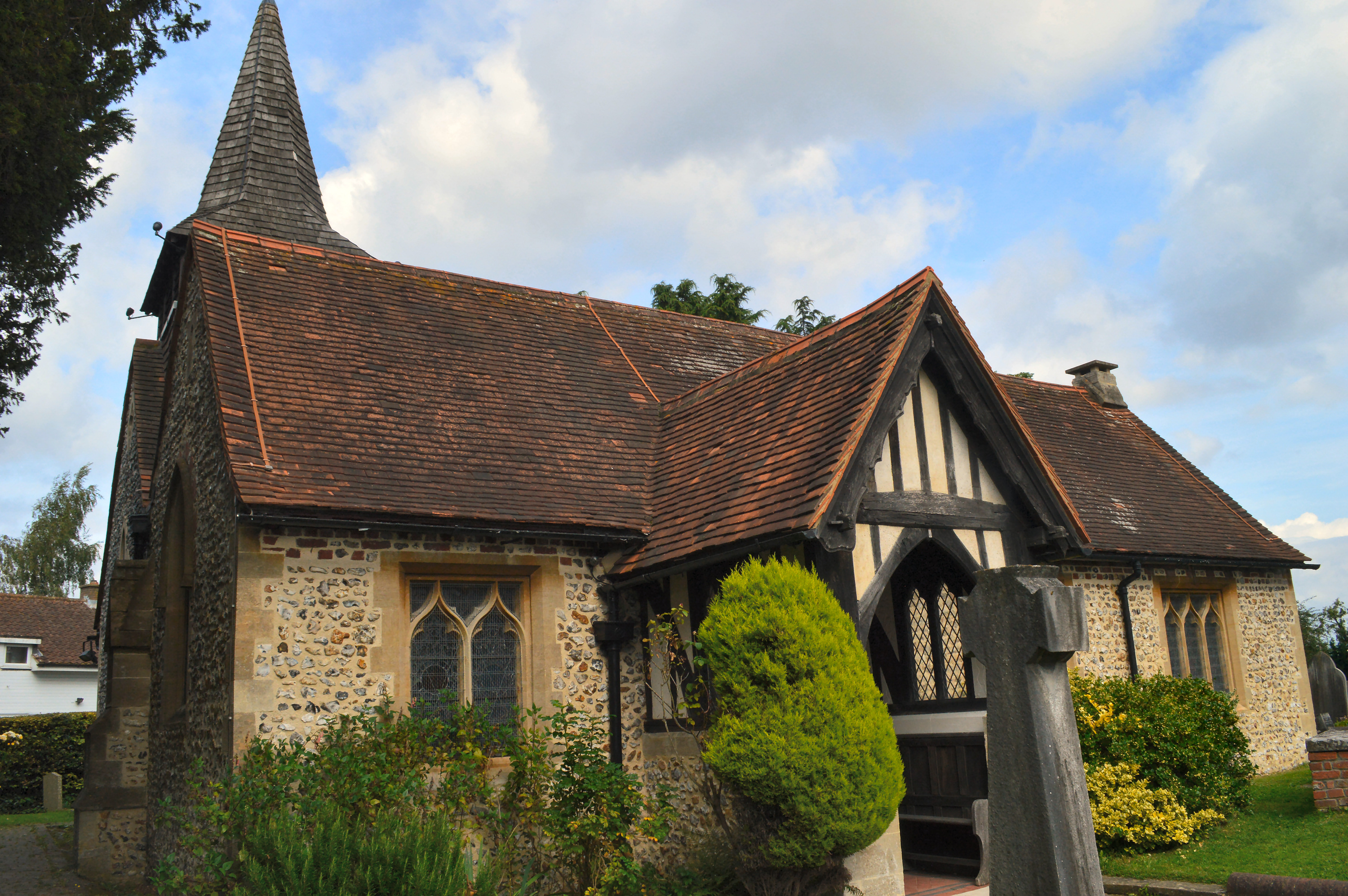
St Mary the Virgin's church

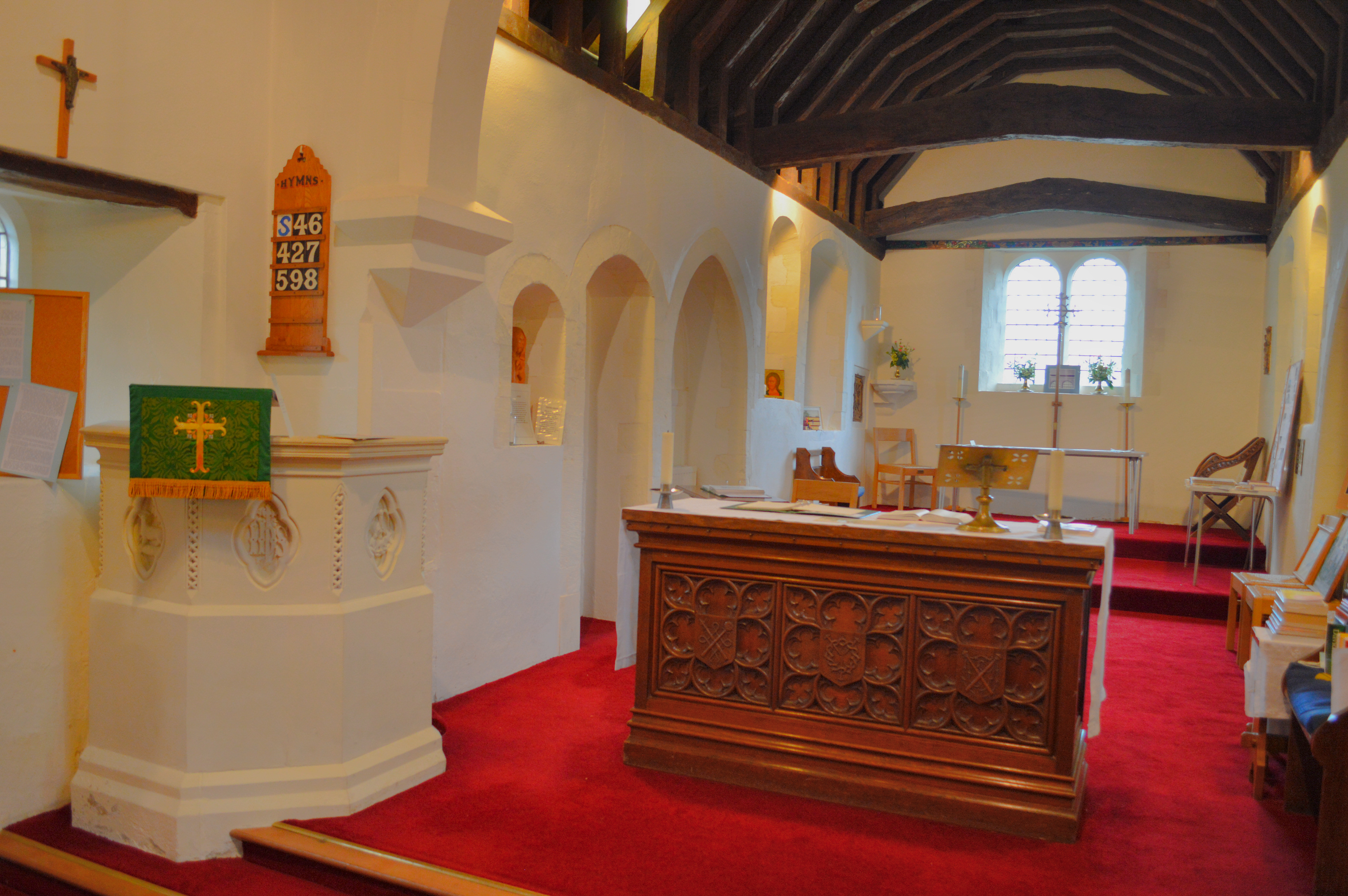
Chancel

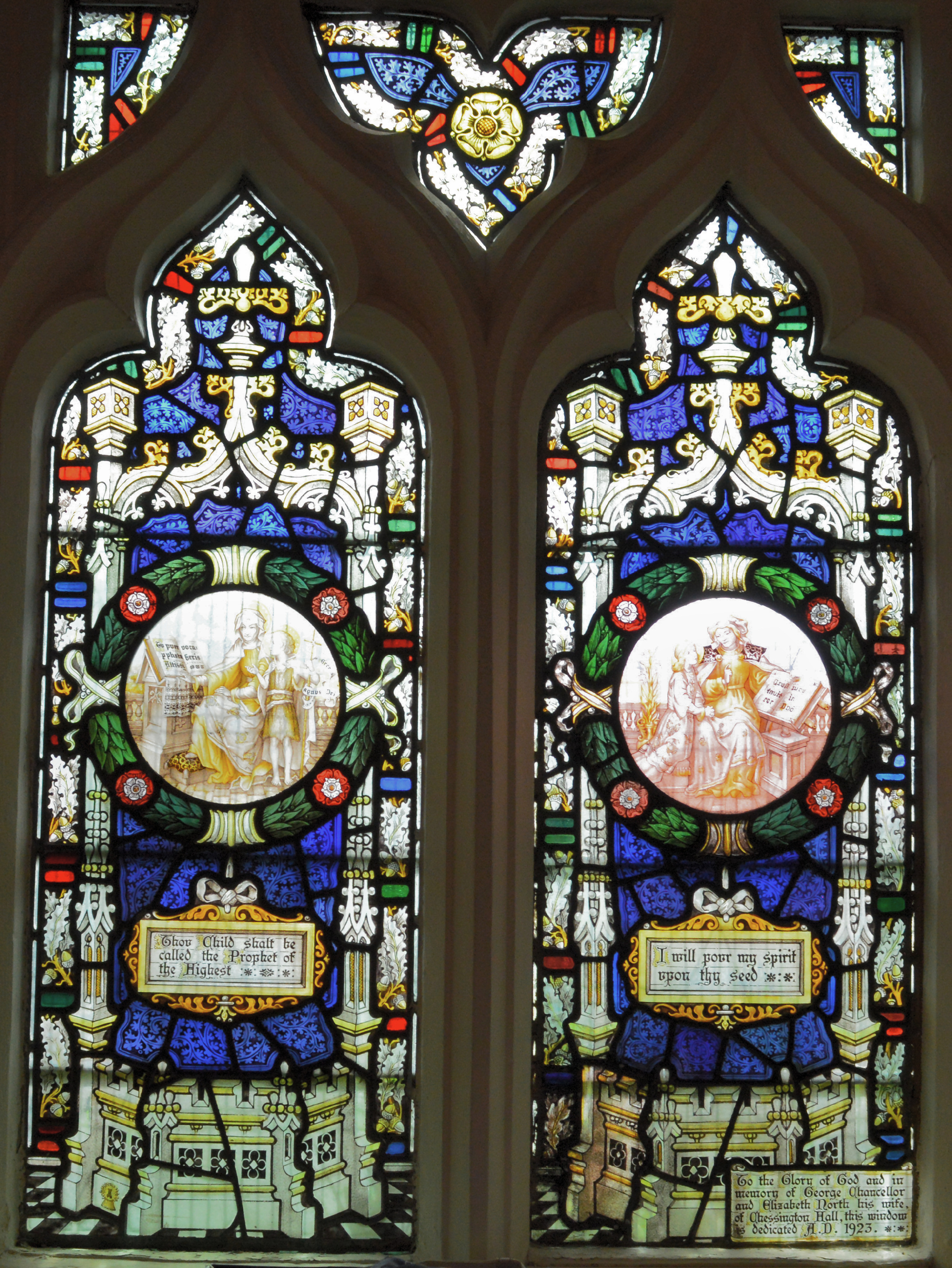
Window by Kempe

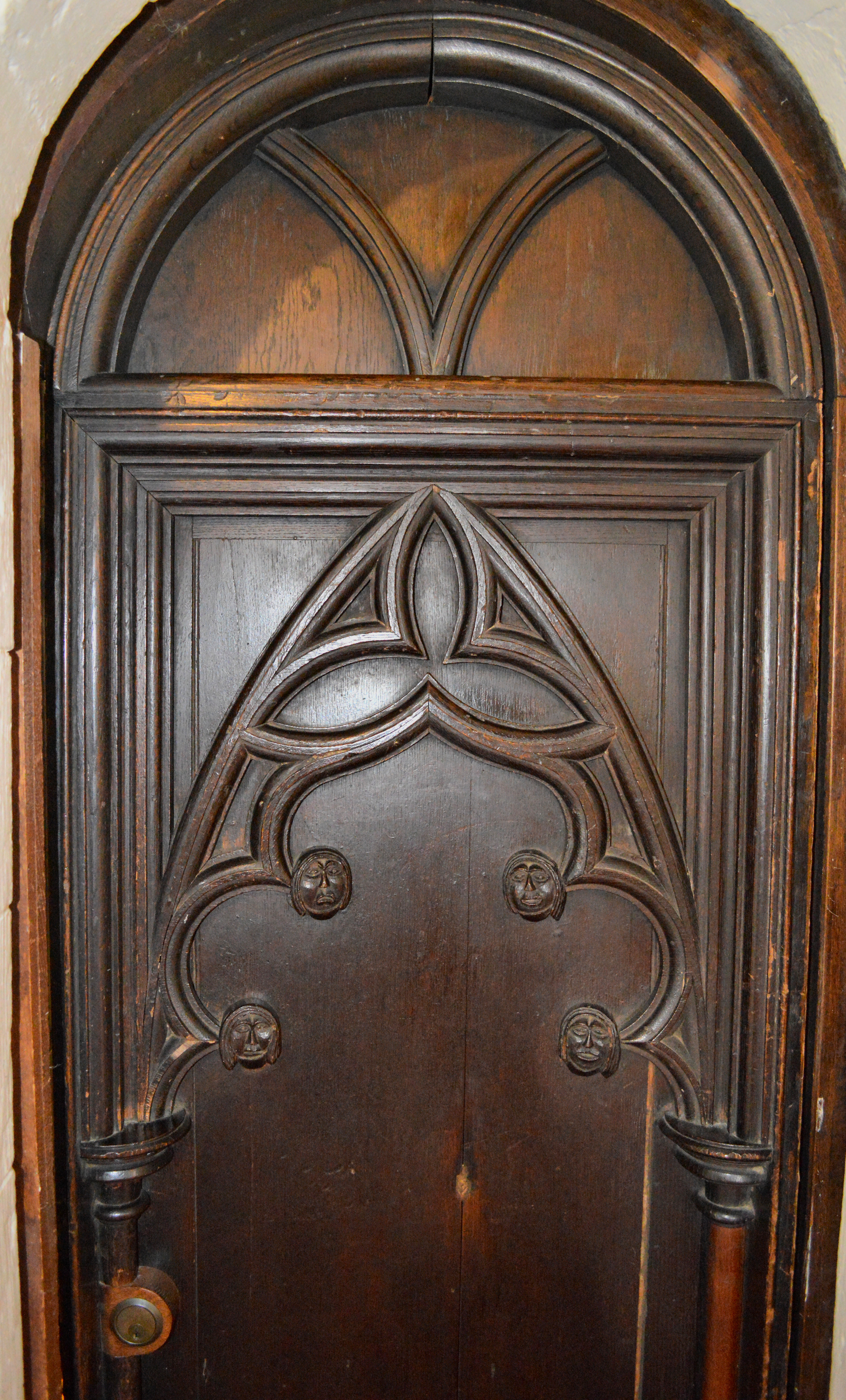
The Priest's door

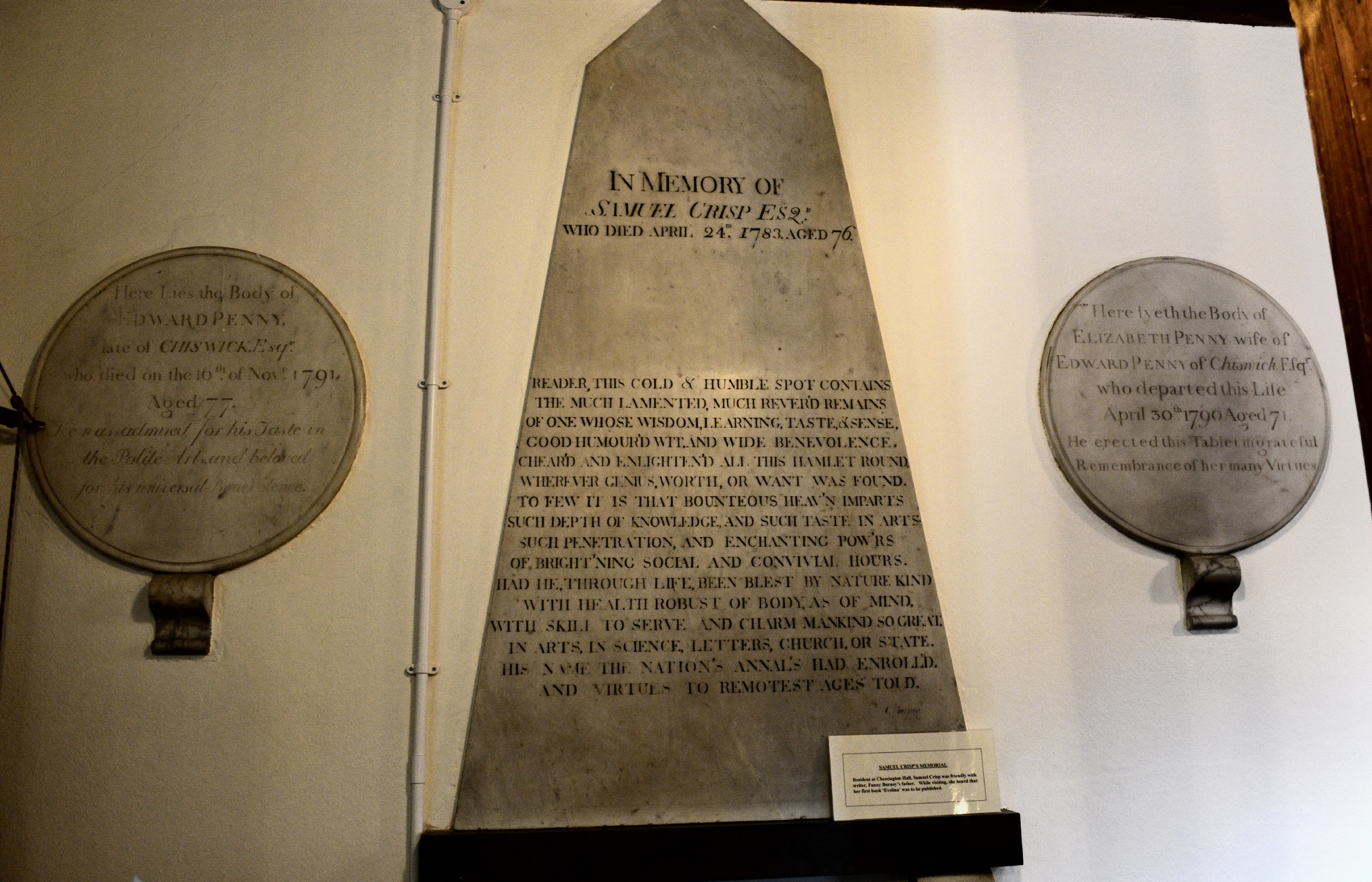
Samuel Crisp monument
