= Rhammel Afflick =

British writer and political activist

Rhammel Afflick BEM FRSA
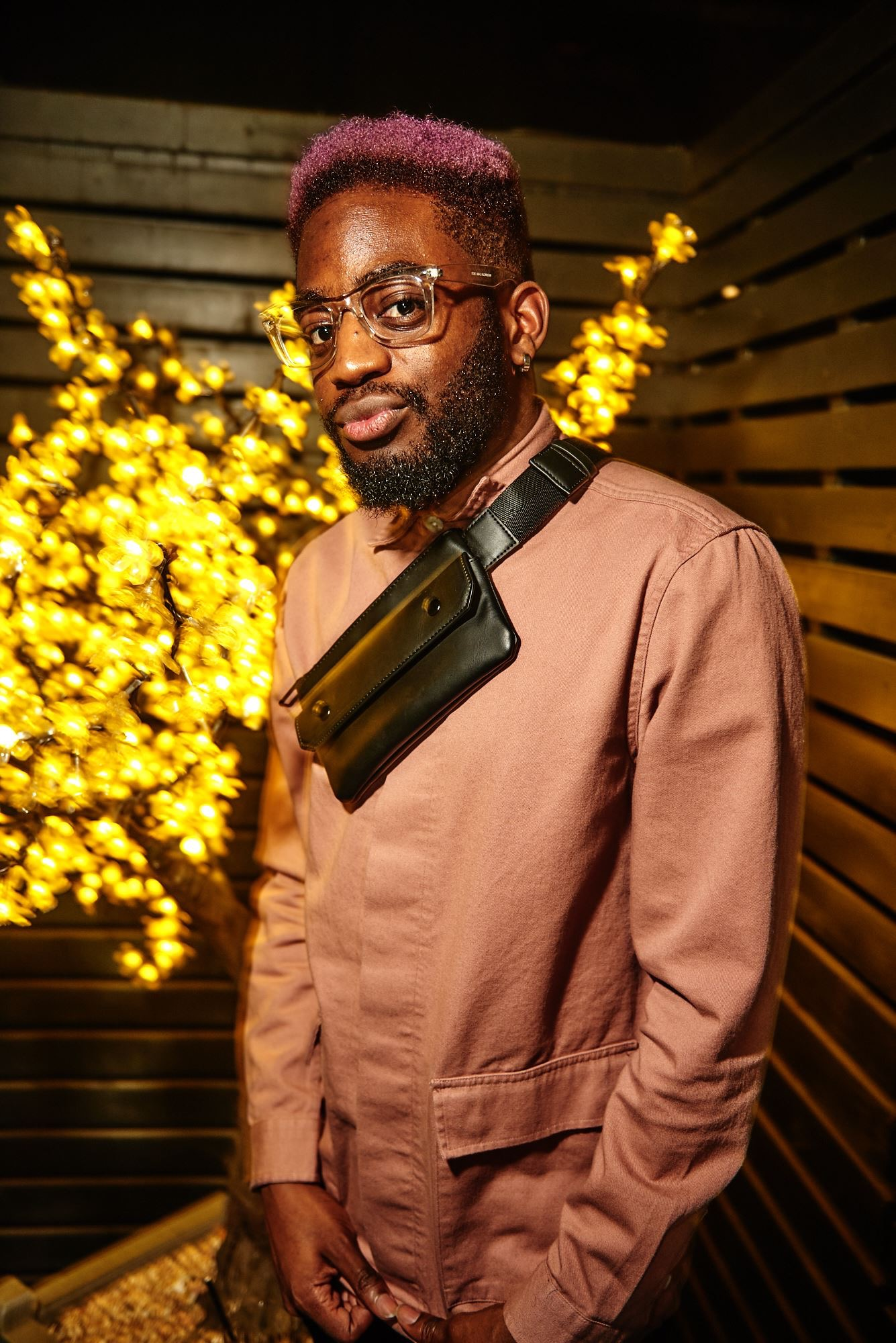
- Born: Rhammel Emmanuel Basil Afflick; 6 April 1994 (age 32); Wandsworth, London, England
- Known for: Political activism
- Awards: British Empire Medal

Rhammel Emmanuel Basil Afflick (born 6 April 1994) is a British writer and political activist. He is best known for his campaigning on race, knife crime and LGBT+ rights. He was Director of Communications for Pride in London from 2019 to 2021.

Born and raised in South West London, Afflick has been campaigning since the age of 11 when he was elected to Kingston Youth Council.

In 2021, Afflick was awarded BEM for services to the community in London in the 2021 New Year Honours.

== Early life and education ==
Afflick was born in Wandsworth and grew up in Balham. He attended Chessington School, known as Chessington Community College at the time, for secondary school and sixth form, completing in 2012. He has written about his experience as a bisexual man in London. Afflick is of West Indian descent with both sides of his family originating from Jamaica.

== Career ==
Afflick began campaigning aged 11, initially focusing on the relationship between young black men and the police. He subsequently became heavily involved in local politics in the Royal Borough of Kingston upon Thames. Afflick was appointed an advisor of local authorities School Admission Forum, Kingston's Community and Police Partnership and many other panels. He was elected a member of the UK Youth Parliament and Chair of the Kington Youth Council in 2011 advocating on issues such as child poverty and public transport.

Afflick continued to campaign on issues affecting young people making regular appearances across the British media. He then started writing for a number of publications including HuffPost and The Independent. Alongside many other young people he has been an advocate of social action following his nomination as an ambassador of the Prince of Wales’ charity Step Up To Serve. In 2015, he co-hosted the charities annual award ceremony alongside British television presenter Susanna Reid.

Afflick has been outspoken about serious youth violence and gangs in the United Kingdom, campaigning on the issue alongside activists like Jeremiah Emmanuel, the founder of One Big Community. He's been vocal about his support for a public health approach to the knife crime epidemic in the capital calling on politicians to take different steps to address the root causes of inequality. He has been critical of the approach taken by successive governments and politicians in response to knife crime. Afflick has repeatedly spoken out about the use of stop and search on young black men in the UK. He has stated he believes policing tactics such as stop and search can be counterproductive and divisive. His joint work with other young activists led to the formation of the UK Parliament Youth Violence Commission where he later gave evidence.

Afflick has been a strong supporter of the UK campaign for lowering the voting age to 16, speaking in support in the lead up to Britain's EU Referendum.

He campaigns on LGBT rights, racism, hate crime and inclusivity in the workplace in the UK. He has spoken about the importance of tackling racism in the LGBT community, intersectionality and allyship.

Afflick volunteers with a number of charities including government-funded charity Police Now where he serves as a trustee.

=== Pride in London ===
Afflick volunteered for Pride in London for more than 7 years starting in 2013 and was appointed Communications Director in November 2019. During his time within the organisation he campaigned on the importance of Pride and championed the need to elevate black and transgender people within the LGBT community.

==== Resignation and aftermath ====
In March 2021, Afflick revealed he had resigned from his position at Pride in London earlier in the year, citing concerns over the organisation's lack of intersectionality and reluctance to listen to black voices or commit to meaningful anti-racism. Pride in London responded by issuing a formal apology. In an interview with ITV News Afflick responded to Pride in London's apology by saying the time had come for pride to demonstrate it was serious about change.

The following day, on 19 March 2021, Pride in London's entire Community Advisory Board resigned over the matter. Approximately 20 volunteers resigned in solidarity as the organisation became 'engulfed in a race row'. The Mayor of London, Sadiq Khan, also intervened shortly after Afflick's resignation stating he was taking the allegation seriously. One of Pride in London's key sponsors, DIVA Magazine, pulled in protest at the revelations from Afflick.

Several leading LGBT+ organisations in the United Kingdom issued statements in support of Afflick, and the other volunteers who resigned including Stonewall, Mermaids and UK Black Pride on Friday 20 March 2021. In an interview with Gay Times, Afflick disclosed that he felt ‘relief’ after issuing his statement. He went on to say “black people shouldn’t have to withdraw from these mainstream spaces for fear of racism”. Later that day five Directors of Pride in London, including Co-Chairs Michael Salter-Church and Ali Camps stepped down following ‘critical media coverage and feedback'. However, many including Afflick called for an overhaul to increase trust in communities with Afflick stating that entirely new leadership was needed.

=== British Youth Council ===
Afflick has worked for the government-funded charity British Youth Council for more than a decade often acting as a spokesperson for the organisation in British media and in UK Parliament.

=== Commentary ===
Afflick spoke out repeatedly in the media against FIFA's decision to host the World Cup in Qatar. Afflick also joined calls for celebrity ambassadors of the game to withdraw their support given Qatar’s well-documented human rights abuses and its laws surrounding LGBT rights.

== Filmography ==
As himself
Year	Title	Role	Ref.
2014–2015	Daily Politics	Guest; 4 episodes	
2018	Channel 4 News	Interviewee	
2022	Unapologetic	Contributor	
2022–2023	Good Morning Britain	Guest; 5 episodes	
2025	+44 Podcast	Guest; 1 episode	

== Awards ==
Afflick was a recipient of the British Empire Medal in the 2021 New Year Honours. He was recognised for more than a decades commitment to campaigning and volunteering in the community

=== Commonwealth honours ===
Country	Date	Appointment	Post-nominal letters
United Kingdom	2020 – present	British Empire Medal	BEM

=== Community Awards ===
Afflick was recognised as one of the 40 Black British individuals who are poised as the next generation of leaders of African and Caribbean descent by the Black Cultural Archives.
