= Chessington Hall =

Country house in Chessington, England

Coordinates: 51°22′46.70″N 00°15′50.81″W

- 1880s map of Chessington
- Interactive map of the Chessington Hall area

General information
- Location: Chessington, England
- Year built: 1520 (original building)
- Demolished: 1965

Chessington Hall was a country house in Chessington, England. It is important in literary history as the home of Samuel Crisp (1707–1783), a close friend of Fanny Burney, the novelist. At the time of the house's existence, Chessington was a village in Surrey; it now forms part of the urban sprawl of contemporary Greater London.

At the time of Samuel Crisp's occupancy, Chessington was a tiny village that stood on a large and nearly desolate common. Crisp retreated to the isolation of Chessington Hall after the failure of his play Virginia in 1754, after selling his house in Hampton, and much of his book and art collection. Crisp shared the house with his friend Christopher Hamilton. Crisp was a close friend of Charles Burney, the musicologist, and came to know his daughter, Fanny Burney. It is likely that Fanny wrote much of her second novel, Cecilia (published in 1782), in the summer house at Chessington, and the pair were frequent and fond correspondents.

Crisp died on 24 April 1783 and is buried in the churchyard at Chessington. He is commemorated by a memorial in the church. The original house, said to date to 1520, was demolished in 1832 and replaced by a new building. From about 1850 to 1910 the Hall was occupied by the Chancellor family; their estate papers are housed in the Surrey History Centre in Woking. In the 1930s the village of Chessington was chosen as a centre for council housing. The house and estate were purchased by compulsory purchase order of Kingston Borough Council in 1946, and the Hall demolished in 1965, at a time when historic houses were regarded as of little value. The housing estate built on the estate is a typical example of 1950s architecture. Nothing survives of the rural charm or history of Chessington Hall, except for the monuments and graves of its occupants in Chessington churchyard.
