= A Bus for a Bus on the Bus =

Single by Cardiac Arrest
- B-side: "A Cake for Bertie's Party"; "Food on the Wall"
- Released: 1979
- Recorded: 22 July 1979
- Studio: Elephant (London)
- Length: 4:33
- Label: Tortch
- Songwriters: Tim Smith; Michael Pugh

Cardiacs singles chronology
"A Bus for a Bus on the Bus" (1979)	"Seaside Treats" (1985)

"A Bus for a Bus on the Bus" is the debut single (Note: The original record is branded as the Cardiac Arrest E.P.. However, The Encyclopedia of Popular Music refers to "A Bus for a Bus on the Bus" as a single, as do subsequent biographers and journalists. On the official Cardiacs website, Peter Tagg and the band's history page also call the record a single. In his book Cardiacs: Every Album Every Song, Eric Benac refers to "A Bus for a Bus on the Bus" as both a single and an EP throughout.) by the English rock band Cardiacs, then known as Cardiac Arrest, released in 1979 under Tortch Records.

Until the release of The Special Garage Concerts Vol II, none of the tracks on the 7-inch single had been reproduced anywhere else. The single was supposed to contain four tracks and not three, but the limited space on the 7-inch format prevented it. The fourth track was to be "Keep Your Dead Mice with You", which was later re-recorded as "Dead Mouse" on the Toy World album. The single is one of the rarest Cardiacs items.

== Background and recording ==
In 1977, Tim Smith formed an early version of Cardiacs with his brother Jim called the Filth, who soon changed their name to Cardiac Arrest.

According to Pugh, Jim Smith broke the E string on his bass during recording. Before recording Cade bought some children's items from a newsagent and brought them to the session. Smith proceeded to give each member a different item and conducted them like an orchestra to make noises on "A Cake for Bertie's Party" during the middle section. During the recording of "Keep Your Dead Mice With You", which was at the end of the session, Smith and Pugh tried to put together a vocal harmony but it was not finished. The songs were mixed at the end of the session.

== Music and lyrics ==
The song's title recalls "A Pound for a Brown on the Bus" from the Mothers of Invention album Uncle Meat (1969).

== Release ==
Cardiac Arrest released "A Bus for a Bus on the Bus" as their debut single (Note: The original record is branded as the Cardiac Arrest E.P.. However, The Encyclopedia of Popular Music refers to "A Bus for a Bus on the Bus" as a single, as do subsequent biographers and journalists. On the official Cardiacs website, Peter Tagg and the band's history page also call the record a single. In his book Cardiacs: Every Album Every Song, Eric Benac refers to "A Bus for a Bus on the Bus" as both a single and an EP throughout.) under Tortch Records. The 7-inch vinyl had 1000 copies made and was sold only at concerts. Few physical copies of the cassette-only recordings were pressed and the single has never been reproduced physically. According to Benac, possessing the Holy Grail of a single could be the ultimate trump card for some Cardiacs fans.

On 13 November 1979, "A Bus for a Bus on the Bus" was played by John Peel on BBC Radio One's John Peel Show.

The band SlapPeR released a version of the song in aid of Tim Smith in January 2020.

== Live performances ==
Cardiac Arrest E.P. has never been reissued, and thus is one of the rarest Cardiacs releases. None of the tracks have ever been reissued from the original master, although tracks have had live versions appearing on other albums.

- All three tracks were performed live on the 2005 live album The Special Garage Concerts Vol II
- A performance of the single appeared on the 2017 DVD Some Fairytales From the Rotten Shed.

== Track listing ==
A1. "A Bus for a Bus on the Bus" (Tim Smith, Michael Pugh) – 4:33
B2. "A Cake for Bertie's Party" (Note: The sleeve spells the title "A Cake for Berties Party" without the apostrophe.) (T. Smith, Jim Smith, Colvin Mayers) – 3:10
B3. "Food on the Wall" (Mayers) – 1:08

== Personnel ==
According to Eric Benac:

- Philip Pilf (Tim Smith) – guitar, vocals
- Patty Pilf (Jim Smith) – bass
- Peter Boker (Michael Pugh) – vocals
- Duncan Doilet (Colvin Mayers) – keyboards
- Richard Targett (Peter Tagg) – drums
- Raphael Cadd (Ralph Cade) – saxophone, triangle

Pete's Cardiacs Site credits synth to Tim Smith rather than vocals and credits Pugh as "Peter 'Zip' Boker" and Mayers as "Max Cat".
