= Hocus Pocus Hall =

House of mirrors at Chessington World of Adventures

Coordinates: 51.3488°N 0.3162°W

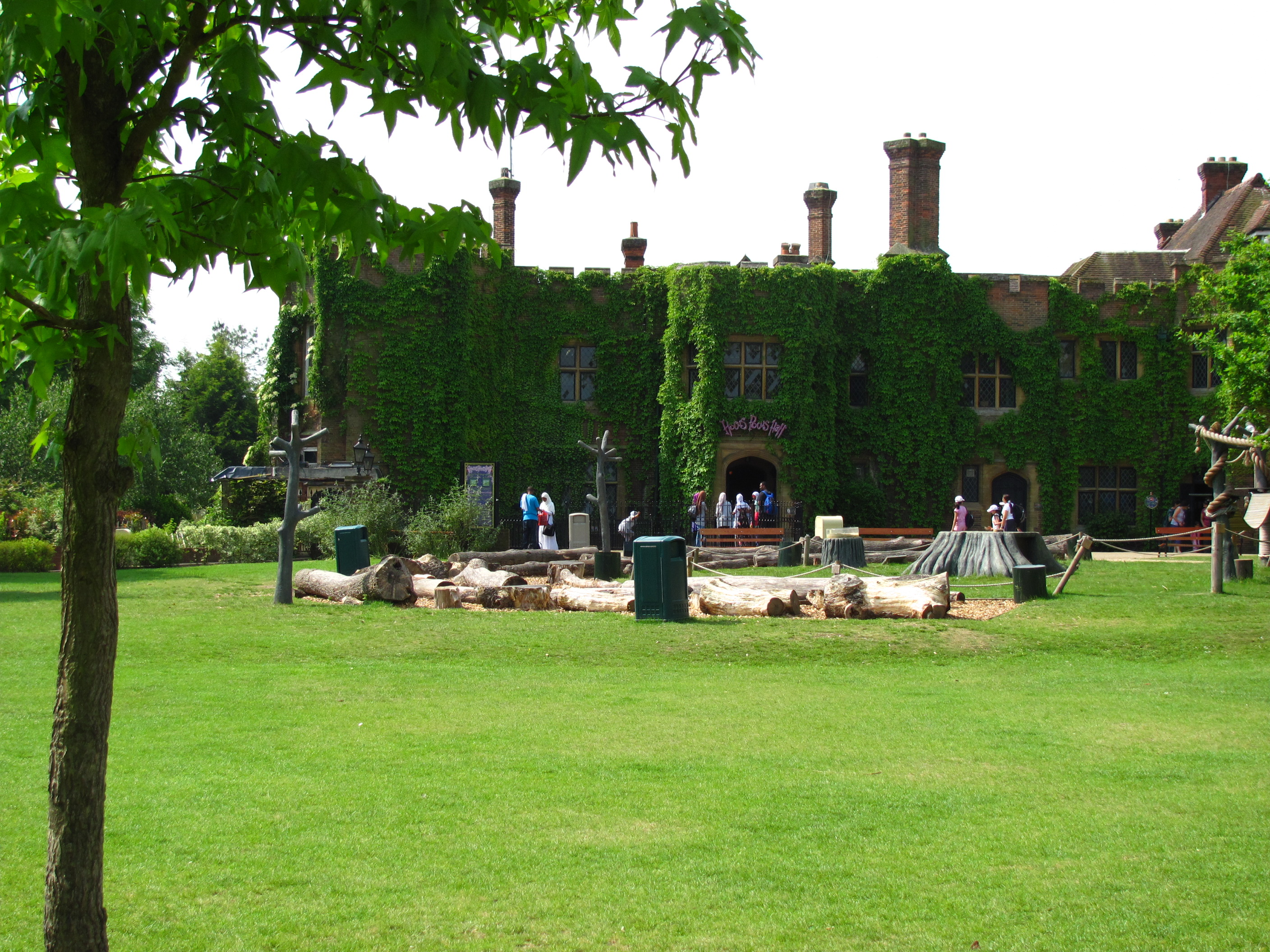

Chessington World of Adventures
- Area: Burnt Stub Mansion
- Status: Closed
- Opening date: 2003; 23 years ago
- Closing date: 2018; 8 years ago
- Replaced by: Room On The Broom: A Magical Journey

Ride statistics
- Attraction type: Themed walkaround
- Designer: Tussauds Studios / Rex Studios
- Theme: Magic

Hocus Pocus Hall was a themed walk-through attraction at Chessington World of Adventures Resort in southwest London, England. Scenes featured 3D UV artwork, viewed via 3-D glasses worn by the guest. The attraction was located on the ground floor of the Burnt Stub Mansion. It opened in 2003 and closed in 2018 to be redeveloped as Room On The Broom: A Magical Journey.

== History ==
The mansion at Chessington World of Adventures Resort, today called Burnt Stub was built in 1348 in Chessington. In the English Civil War it became a royalist stronghold, later being razed by Oliver Cromwell's Parliamentary forces giving it its modern name.

During the park's 2013 Halloween event, the attraction had a makeover as “The Mystery of Hocus Pocus Hall”, featuring a new theme overlay and soundtrack.

The 3-D glasses were disused in 2017. It was announced in October 2018 that Hocus Pocus Hall would be redeveloped as Room On The Broom, based on the children's book by Julia Donaldson. It opened as Room on The Broom in 2019 and is still operating today.

=== Attraction description ===
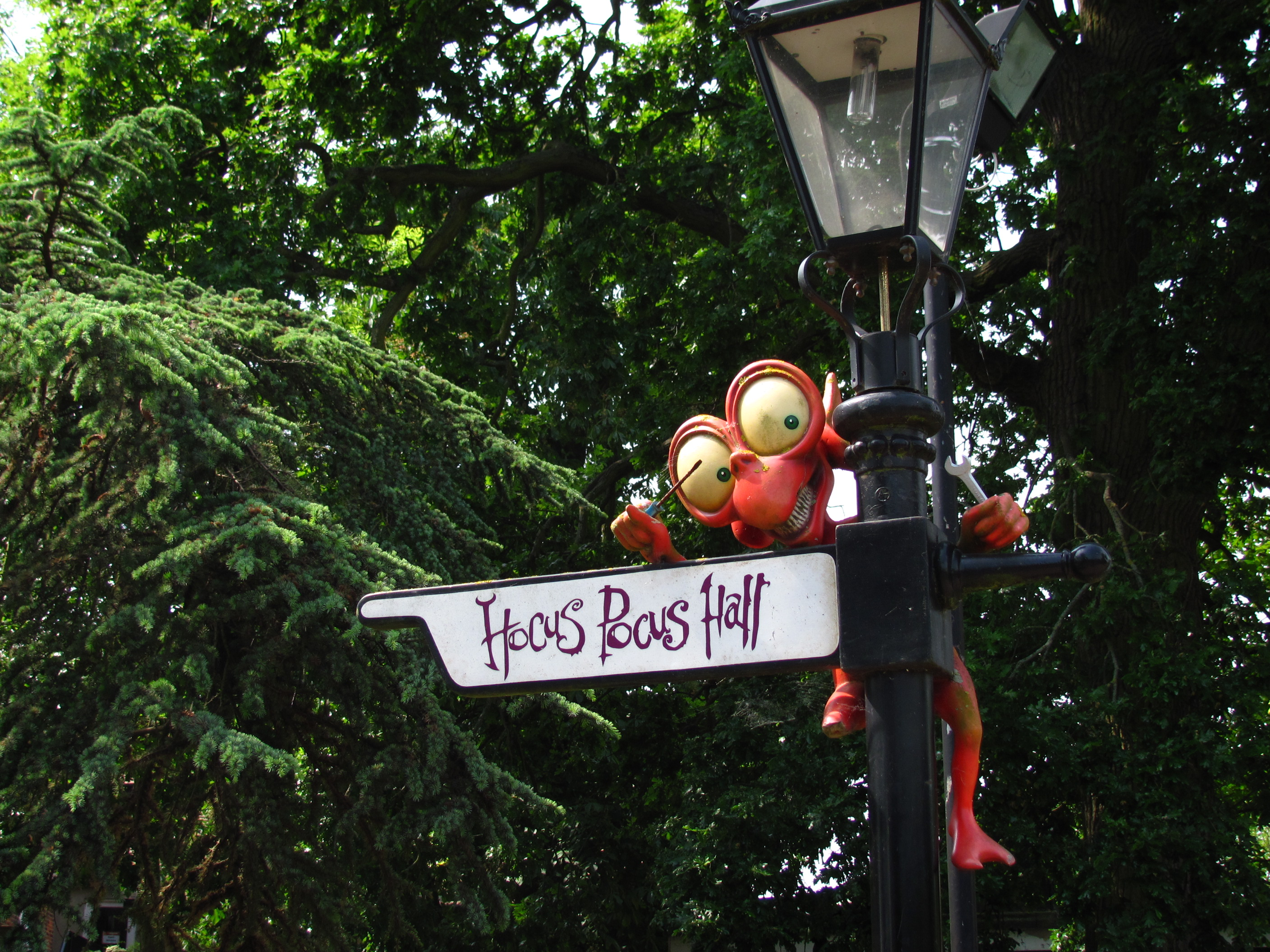
A gremlin outside the attraction

The attraction would begin with a preshow scene inside the main vestibule of the mansion, where you were greeted by a wizard and a troublesome goblin. The room then transformed with UV artwork and a hidden door would open. This led to a corridor themed to a library and into a rotating trommel tunnel.

After the tunnel, you reached a laboratory where goblins were causing chaos in the form of animated figures and peppers-ghost style video screens. Guests could interact with buttons and putting their hands in holes for a surprise. The next scene was the wizard's bedroom, where guests witnessed the goblins interacting with the sleeping wizard and could sit on a chair to activate fart sound effects.

A corridor with uneven floors then led to the finale, a mirror maze. The maze also included a drop off point for the 3D glasses. The maze was themed to a magic garden, hiding several goblins appearing through the two-way mirrors. Guests then exited to outside.

== See also ==
- Chessington World of Adventures Resort
- House of mirrors
