= Virginia (play) =

- Original language: English
- Written by: Samuel Crisp
- Genre: Tragedy

Premiere
- Date: 25 February 1754
- Place: Theatre Royal, Drury Lane

Virginia is a 1754 tragedy by the British writer Samuel Crisp. The play is set in Ancient Rome, and portrays the story of Appius and Virginia.

It premiered at the Theatre Royal, Drury Lane with a cast that included David Garrick as Virginius, David Ross as Iclius, Henry Mossop as Appius, Thomas Davies as Claudius, Thomas Mozeen as Rufus, Susannah Maria Cibber as Virginia, Elizabeth Bennett as Plautia and Mary Ann Yates as Marcia.

== Bibliography ==
- Nicoll, Allardyce. A History of English Drama 1660-1900: Volume III. Cambridge University Press, 2009.
- Hogan, C.B (ed.) The London Stage, 1660-1800: Volume V. Southern Illinois University Press, 1968.
