= Elizabeth Bennett (stage actress) =

British stage actress (1714–1791)

Elizabeth Bennett (1714-1791) was a British stage actress. For twenty six years she was part of the regular company of Drury Lane under David Garrick specialising in portraying maids, gossips, and mistresses.

== Selected roles ==
- Lady Loverule in The Devil to Pay (1741)
- Nerissa in The Merchant of Venice (1745)
- Plautia in Virginia (1754)

== Bibliography ==
- Highfill, Philip H, Burnim, Kalman A. & Langhans, Edward A. A Biographical Dictionary of Actors, Actresses, Musicians, Dancers, Managers, and Other Stage Personnel in London, 1660-1800: Volume VIII. SIU Press, 1973.
- The Plays of David Garrick: Volume II, 1767-1775. SIU Press, 1980.
