= Elisabeth Bennett =

British archivist

Elisabeth Bennett is former university archivist of Swansea University. Appointed in 1993, Bennett has developed the archives from a one-person, limited service, to the first university archive in the UK, and the first in Wales, to attain Archives Service Accreditation.

Bennett has been consulted by archivists and academics both nationally and internationally. She was a member and former chair (2005–2007) of Archives and Records Council Wales (ARCW) and has worked with Museums, Archives and Libraries Division, Welsh Government (MALD) on a number of collaborative projects.

Bennett retired from Swansea University in 2017.

== Education and early career ==
Bennett attended University College London and obtained a diploma in archive studies in 1980. After qualifying, Bennett worked as assistant archivist in the West Devon Record Office, Plymouth and as archivist in charge of West Glamorgan Area Record Office, then a branch of Glamorgan Record Office in Swansea. The latter moved into purpose-built accommodation in 1983 and Bennett was involved in setting up the service.

== Development of Swansea University Archives ==
In 1993, Bennett joined the staff as part-time library archivist at Swansea University (then University College of Swansea) and later became university archivist. Bennett succeeded first university archivist David Bevan, who had been employed between 1965 and 1993. David had set a firm foundation for the archives, particularly in organising and cataloguing the collections, which Bennett would go on to develop throughout her career.

Bennett worked to establish a service that was run on professional lines and to establish standards that were widespread in other professionally run archive services. Along with colleagues in the University Library, Bennett established a supervised reading room, and introduced an Archives Collection Policy which provided a strategic and integrated approach to archive collections management. Bennett subscribed to the Historical Manuscripts Commission (HMC) ‘Standard for Record Repositories’, and worked with HMC and later the National Archives to develop the archive collections at Swansea University. In the 1990s Bennett began to work with academic departments to run teaching sessions and encouraged students and researchers to access the archive collections for their research.

From the outset Bennett's priorities were to improve the physical conditions of storage of the archive collections and to gain accommodation that met BS5454:2000 standards (superseded by BS4971:2017). Bennett led the relocation of the university archives to new accommodation in 2009. The new accommodation consisted of purpose built archival strong rooms, an isolation room, staff offices, reading room and reception area. For the first time in the university's history, the archives had its own identifiable space which resulted in increased visibility and access to the service for students, staff and the general public. The project amounted to £1.3 million from Higher Education for Wales (HEFCW) funds that had been received by Swansea University.

The new accommodation gave the archives the opportunity to develop its work with teaching and learning. In 2013 Professor Louise Miskell, Department of History, introduced a module on the history of the Students' Union at Swansea University. The module was run from the archives, and enabled students to access the archive collections of the university to research the history of the Students' Union. In recent years the university's archive collections have been widely used as part of modules, both within the College of Arts and Humanities and across academic departments,

In 1998, Bennett was asked to undertake a project to organise the inventories of Swansea University's art collection. As well as operating a lending system for works of art, Bennett aimed to improve the preservation of the works within the collection. This has notably included the conservation of watercolour panels by Sarah Vivian, along with Sir Kyffin Williams' ‘Snowdon Snow, Penrhyn Ddu’ and Percy Gleaves 'The Foundation Stone Ceremony, 19 July 1920’.

In 2005 the archive collections of the actor Richard Burton were deposited to the university archives by his widow, Sally Burton. In 2010 the service was renamed the Richard Burton Archives, Swansea University.

In 2014 the Richard Burton Archives became the first university archive in the UK, and the first in Wales, to attain Archives Service Accreditation. This was a major achievement which demonstrated that the management of the archive collections, services to users and accommodation met externally validated professional standards. Bennett was invited to speak at the Houses of Parliament.

In 2015 the Richard Burton Archives entered Swansea University's Research as Art competition with an image designed to change perceptions about archives. 'The Archives Treasure Hoard' was created in collaboration with Ian Vine and received a Highly Commended prize. The image has gone on to be used in promotional material within Swansea University and beyond, including the ARCW publication 'Into the Archives ', and the National Archives 'Archives Unlocked' brochure.

Throughout her time at Swansea University, Bennett has developed the preservation and access of the archive collections. This has included securing funding for the following:-

- ‘Reaping the Dividends’. A project to catalogue the records of the Co-operative Societies in South Wales, funding awarded by CyMAL (2007)
- Conservation of the Registers of St David’s Priory Church, funding received from the National Manuscripts Conservation Trust (2008)
- The conservation and digitisation of records created by the mining trade union, the South Wales Miners’ Federation (2015)

== Projects ==
=== Richard Burton Collection ===
In 2005 the archive collections of the actor Richard Burton were deposited to the university archives by his widow, Sally Burton. The collection consists of press cuttings, photographs, and correspondence, and sheds further light on Burton's personal and professional life. Bennett arranged for conservation work to be carried out on the 1940 diary and film posters, and funding was secured by Chris West (Director of Library and Information Services, Swansea University, 1999–2010) for a project archivist to catalogue the collection in 2006/7.

In 2012 Bennett enabled a member of the archives team to transcribe the Burton diaries, and to provide advice on copyright in the Burton collection, for the publication of the Richard Burton Diaries, edited by Professor Chris Williams. The publication was a great success and brought worldwide publicity for Swansea University and the archives.

In 2015/16 Bennett worked with Eirwen Hopkins (College of Science Choice Project, Swansea University) on the application stage of the Richard Burton @14 project. Funded by the Heritage Lottery Fund Young Roots Programme, this project enabled students of Neath Port Talbot College to use the Burton diaries and other resources to uncover the social history of the town of Neath Port Talbot, and to see how different – or not – the issues facing a young Burton were from those experienced by today's local young people. This project grew out of Sally Burton's expressed desire at the time of deposit of the Richard Burton Collection to see it used to inspire young people by Richard Burton's example.

=== The South Wales Coalfield Collection ===
The South Wales Coalfield Collection provides a unique picture of life in the coalfield valleys during the late nineteenth and the twentieth centuries, concentrating on the workers and the organisations they created. It contains records of trade unions, miners' institutes, co-operative societies, and individuals connected with the mining community. Archival material (such as minute books, financial records, correspondence etc.) and photographs are held in the Richard Burton Archives, and published material, is held at the South Wales Miners' Library. Bennett was involved in the planning, bid writing and implementation of the following projects:-

- In 1995/96 the university received £70,000 from HEFCW to improve access to the South Wales Coalfield Collection by the provision of a comprehensive online catalogue. The project received a further £5000 from the British Library Grant for Cataloguing and Preservation to catalogue the audio visual collections.
- In 2002/03 the Coalfield Web Materials project was funded by the New Opportunities Fund (now Big Lottery) to digitise the photographic and audio visual material contained within the South Wales Coalfield Collection, and produce an educational resource.
- In 2011 Swansea University received funding from the Wellcome Trust for the project 'Disability and Industrial Society, 1780-1948’, which explored how understandings and experiences of disability were affected by industrial development from the late eighteenth century until the end of the Second World War. Bennett sat on the Public Engagement Panel and provided expertise on how archives offer insights into the understanding of disability.

Between 2008 and 2011, along with colleagues at Swansea University, Bennett visited Japan to discuss the preservation and cataloguing work of the South Wales Coalfield Collection, and to tour coalfield and heritage sites on the island of Hokkaido and in the Joban coalfield. The visits were funded by the Japanese Society for the Promotion of Science and the Daiwa Anglo-Japanese Foundation. Reciprocal visits were made by Japanese researchers for symposia in Swansea and Gregynog.

=== Metallurgical Industry Collections ===
Bennett has worked on a number of projects, and utilised the expertise of her team, to raise the profile and increase access to the metallurgical collections held at the Richard Burton Archives, particularly copper, tinplate and steel. These projects have included:-

- Working with Copper. In 2010 the Economic and Social Research Council (ESRC) awarded Swansea University and its partners £95,000 to raise awareness of the rich heritage of a once internationally famed Welsh copper industry
- Between 2009 and 2012, Bennett made successful bids on behalf of ARCW for funding to the National Cataloguing Grants Scheme (NCGS) and MALD relating to cataloguing and promoting business archives across Wales.
- From 2012 Bennett worked in collaboration with ARCW to increase knowledge and accessibility of steel archives and the history of the steel industry in Wales. This began with a scoping study of records at Tata Steel Record Centre in Shotton and archive services across Wales. This provided the evidence for a further successful application to NCGS for a project to catalogue steel records, Wales Showing Our Metal, and a complementary conservation project Forging Ahead, which was funded by National Manuscripts Conservation Trust (NMCT).
- Sandfields: A Community Built on Steel led by West Glamorgan Archive Service and working with pupils of Sandfields Comprehensive School (2015)
- Visions of Steel (2016)
