= The Trudy =

English pop band

- Origin: Kingston upon Thames, England
- Genre: Pop
- Years active: 1979–present
- Labels: Binkie; Solotone; Torso; Primitive; Planet Miron; Indisc; Vinyl Japan; Popfiction; Miron Music
- Spinoffs: Richard Targett and the Monos, Luminous
- Spinoff of: Cardiac Arrest
- Members: Del Tagg; Peter Tagg; Melissa Jo Heathcote
- Past members: Ralph Cade; Sue Smallwood; Lorna Douglas; Ian Plummer; Philippa Blanchard; Jon Bastable Jnr; Arturo Bassick; Paul Crook; Eugene Bezodis
- Website: thetrudy.co.uk

The Trudy are an English pop band formed in Kingston upon Thames in 1979 by former Cardiacs members Peter Tagg (drums) and Ralph Cade (vocals and keyboards) along with Derek Tagg (guitar) and Sue Smallwood (bass).

In 1980 The Trudy, with the above line-up, released an album Volcano Fo Le Ferret, on Binkie Records along with another Kingston band The Magnificent 7, with each band featuring on one side of the record.

In 1981 the band were included on the various artist compilation LP The Snoopies Album, which also included The Europeans and Cardiacs among others.

In 1982 the band released the cassette single Air Commodore. By this time Sue Smallwood had been replaced on bass by Jon Bastable Jnr and second guitarist Ian Plummer had been added.

Many releases followed on a variety of different labels. Among these was the 1998 EP given free with House of Dolls, a popular mainstream alternative music magazine, on which The Trudy was included, along with The Wedding Present, Claytown Troupe & The Hunters Club.

A 1986 side-project was released by Peter Tagg/Richard Targett, Victor Champion, Nick Shadow, Minerva Allen and Damien Saxxe-Coburg, all with various links to the band. By the name 'Richard Targett and the Monos', one three-track cassette EP was released under Primitive Records by the name of 'One of Our Satellites is Missing!'.

In 1991, when they released the album Tune-In To The Trudy Love-Ray!, the line-up was Peter Tagg, Derek Tagg, Melisa Jo Heathcote Paul Crook and Arturo Bassick (of The Lurkers, Pinpoint and 999).

In 1993 they released the David M Allen & Rat Scabies produced single Big Wheel under the alias Luminous.

In 2010 the band covered the Cardiacs song "Day Is Gone" on the album Leader of the Starry Skies: A Tribute to Tim Smith, Songbook 1 on the Believers Roast label.

In 2012 the singles Dirt Cheap Melody and Bucolics Anonymous were released.

The Trudy has performed extensively around the UK and headlined venues such as the Marquee and University of London Union. A flyer for a Marquee gig that The Trudy headlined is in the Victoria and Albert Museum collection.

As of 2016 the line up was Melissa Jo Heathcote (formerly of The Pukes), Del Tagg, Paul Crook, Peter Tagg & Eugene Bezodis (of Patrick & Eugene).

On 26 February 2016 the single "Rocket Heart" was released and was followed by the album Always Never Beautiful Forever on 15 April.

On 5 March 2021 they released the digital single "Dear Sancho", which was accompanied by a promotional video. On 10 November 2023 the single "Every Story Ever Told" was released and a forthcoming mini album was announced.

== Discography ==
=== Studio albums ===
- Volcano Fo Lé Ferret (1980, Binkie Records, with the Magnificent 7)
- Tune-In to the Trudy Love-Ray (1991, Planet Miron Records)
- Always Never Beautiful Forever (2016, Miron Music)

=== Mini albums ===
- Outside Time (2023, Miron Records)

=== Live albums ===
- Live at The Square, Harlow (1990, Planet Miron Records)

=== Compilation albums ===
- The Adventures! The Suspense!! (2009, Vinyl Japan)

=== EPs ===
- Air-Commodore (1982, Solotone)
- Le Shindig (1985, Solotone)

=== Singles ===
- "The Invisible Man" (1984, Torso)
- "Captain Scarlet" (1986, Primitive Records)
- "Countdown to Love" (1989, Tune-In to the Trudy Love-Ray)
- "Living on a Moon" (1989, Planet Miron) - flipped version of "Countdown to Love" with B-side becoming A-side
- "Destination Love" (1990, Tune-In to the Trudy Love-Ray)
- "Big Wheel" (1993, Indolent) - released under the alias 'Luminous'
- "Oh!" (2006, self-released)
- "Lost Summer of Love" (2006, self-released)
- "3 Minutes 4 U" (2007, Popficton)
- "Dirt Cheap Melody" (2012, Always Never Beautiful Forever)
- "Bucolics Anonymous" (2012, Always Never Beautiful Forever)
- "Rocket Heart" (2016, Always Never Beautiful Forever)
- "Dear Sancho" (2021, Miron Music)
- "Every Story Ever Told" (2023, Miron Music)

=== Appearances ===
- "Day Is Gone" (2010, Leader of the Starry Skies: A Tribute to Tim Smith, Songbook 1)
