= Samuel Crisp =

English dramatist

Samuel Crisp (1707 – 24 April 1783) was an English dramatist. He is known for the play Virginia, produced at Drury Lane in 1754.

== Life ==
He was baptised on 14 November 1707. His father Samuel Crisp, a London merchant, was a grandson of the theologian Tobias Crisp; his mother was Florence, daughter of Charles Williams.

Crisp was educated at Eton College. By the age of thirteen he had lost both his parents; he was a residuary legatee and he is not known to have followed a profession. He led the life of a dilettante. He lived in Italy for a few years, studying art and music, returning in 1740. In England he knew Fulke Greville and the music historian Charles Burney.

At the request of the Countess of Coventry he wrote the play Virginia, a tragedy based on the story of Appius and Verginia. The play was reluctantly accepted by David Garrick, who contributed prologue and epilogue, and in February 1754 it was produced at Drury Lane, where it ran for eleven nights. Although there was little open censure, it was felt that an experiment had been made on the patience of the public which would not bear repetition. When a few weeks later Virginia appeared in print, the critics, particularly in the Monthly Review, condemned plot, characters, and diction.

Crisp, however, devoted himself to the task of revision, in the hope of being completely successful in the following year; but Garrick showed little disposition to bring the amended tragedy on the stage, and at length was obliged to return a decided refusal. Crisp was bitterly disappointed. "He became," wrote Macaulay, "a cynic and a hater of mankind".

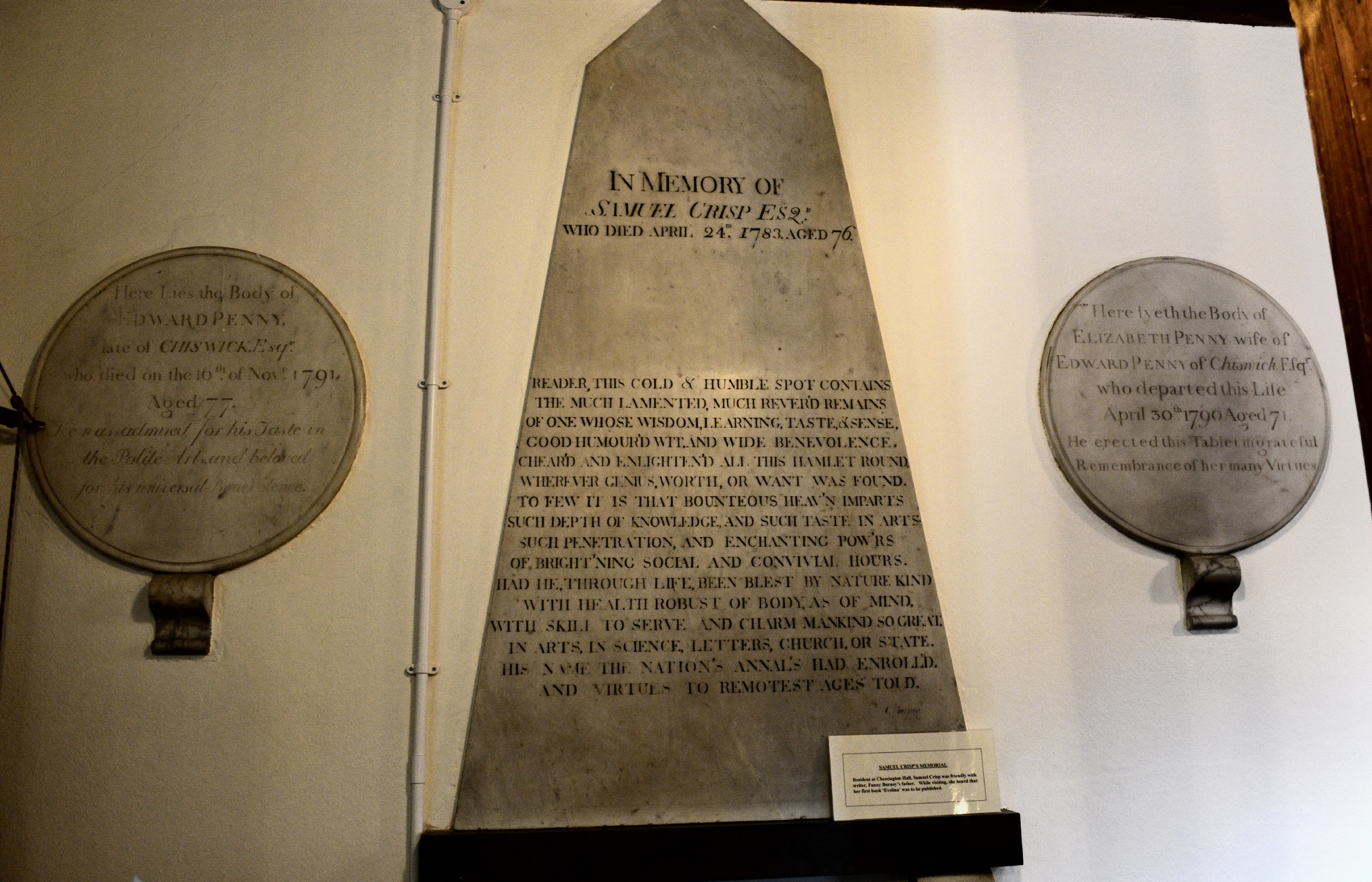
Memorial in St Mary the Virgin's church

He sought retirement with his friend Christopher Hamilton at the latter's country-house, Chessington Hall. He remained after Hamilton's death in 1759, as a boarder of Hamilton's unmarried sister Sarah. Crisp was frequently visited by his sister, Mrs Sophia Gast of Burford, Oxfordshire, by his old friend and protégé Charles Burney, and by Burney's family; he was a close friend of Burney's daughter, the writer Frances Burney, and advised her on her writing.

He died at Chessington on 24 April 1783, aged 76, and was buried in the parish church. A marble tablet was erected to his memory bearing lines by Burney. He was unmarried.
