= Peter Tagg =

British drummer, formerly in Cardiacs

- Also known as: Richard Targett
- Born: Peter David Tagg; 1959 (age 66–67); London, England
- Occupation: Musician
- Instrument: Drums
- Years active: 1977-present
- Member of: The Trudy
- Formerly of: Cardiacs, Tempting Fate, Richard Targett and the Monos, Religion, Olivia De Chaunac, Luminous

Peter David Tagg (born 1959) is a British drummer, formerly in Cardiacs from 1977 to 1979, and currently in The Trudy since 1979.

== Personal life ==
Peter David Tagg was born in 1959 in Southfields, London, England.
