= List of the Wildhearts band members =

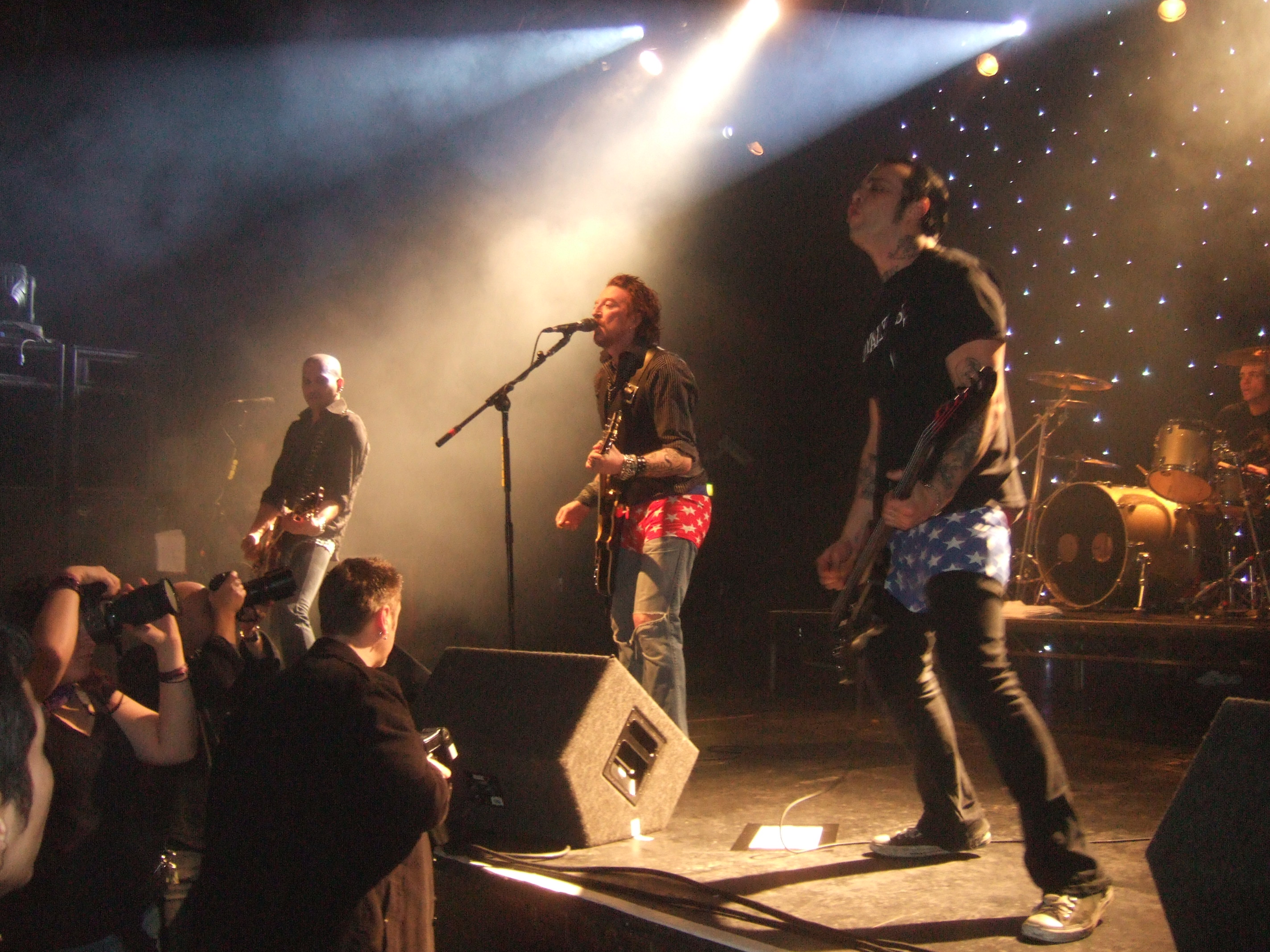
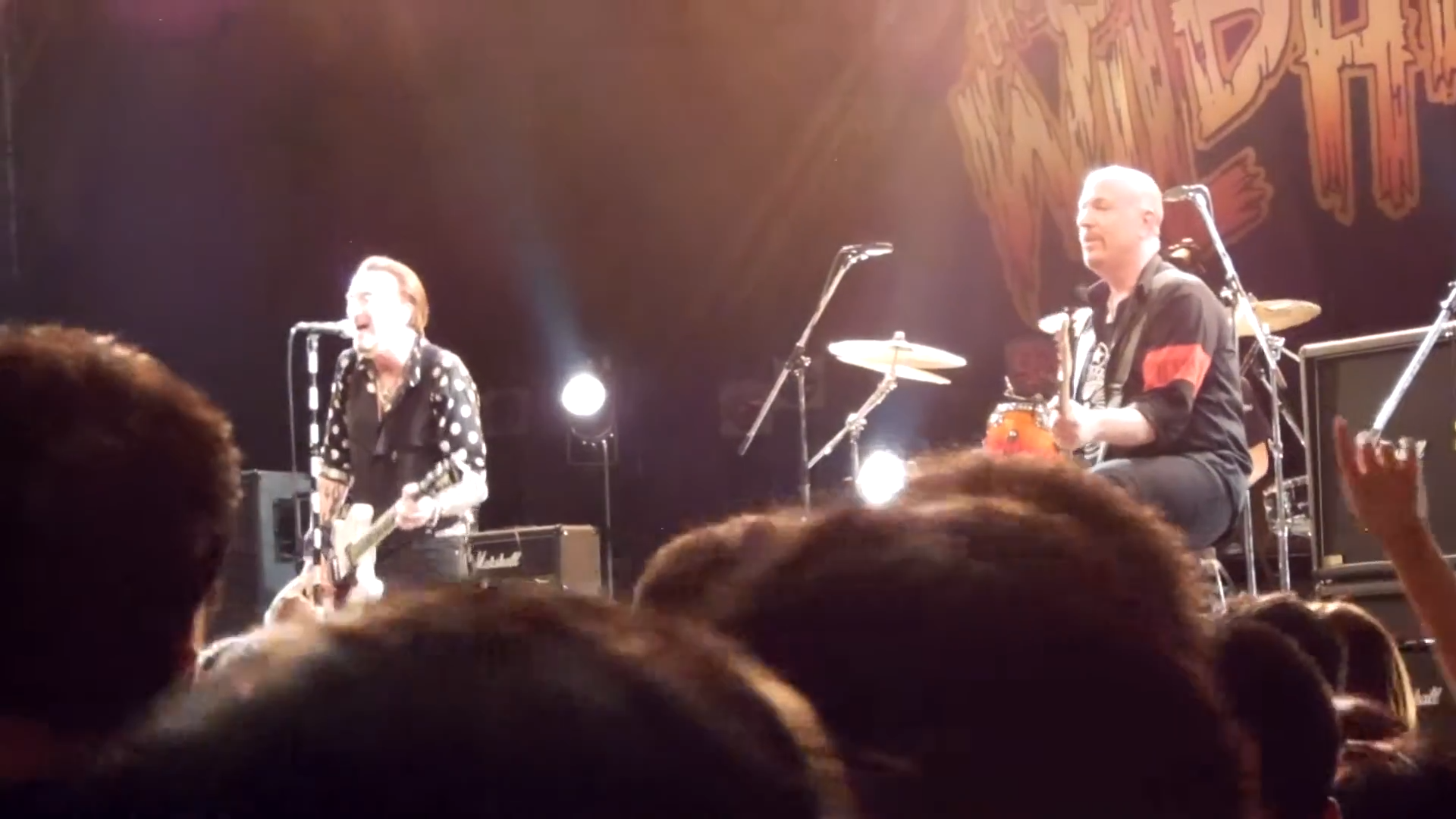
Two line-ups of The Wildhearts performing in 2007 and 2015.

The Wildhearts are a British rock band from Newcastle upon Tyne. Formed in 1989, the group originally consisted of vocalist Stuart "Snake" Neale, guitarists Ginger (born David Walls) and CJ Wildheart (real name Chris Jagdhar), bassist Julien "Joolz" Dean, and drummer Andrew "Stidi" Stidolph. After several early lineup changes, Ginger took over as lead vocalist and has remained in this role ever since. The current lineup of the Wildhearts also includes bassist "Random" Jon Poole (who first joined in 2003, and most recently rejoined in 2024), alongside 2024 additions Ben Marsden on guitar and Charles Evans on drums.

== History ==
=== 1989–1999 ===
Ginger formed the Wild Hearts in August 1989. The original lineup featured vocalist Stuart "Snake" Neale, guitarist Chris "CJ" Wildheart, bassist Julien "Joolz" Dean and drummer Andrew "Stidi" Stidolph. The band went through a number of personnel changes during 1990 and 1991: first, Pat "Panache" Walters replaced Stidolph; in the summer of 1990, Neale briefly left and was replaced by Dunken Francis Mullett; in March 1991, Neale left permanently and the group became a four-piece with Ginger on vocals; and in mid-1991, Danny McCormack replaced Dean. By October 1991, Walters had been replaced by Bam Ross, with whom the group recorded Mondo Akimbo a-Go-Go and Don't Be Happy... Just Worry; around the time of the latter's November 1992 release, Ross was replaced by the returning Stidolph.

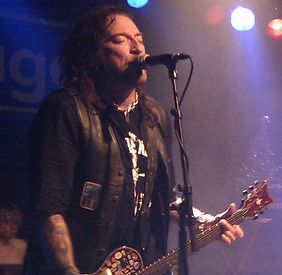
Ginger took over as lead vocalist of the Wildhearts in 1991 and has remained in this role since.

With Stidolph back in the band, the Wildhearts released Earth vs the Wildhearts in 1993, before Ritch Battersby took over on drums that October. His first recordings with the band were the 1994 single "Caffeine Bomb" and second album Fishing for Luckies. Early the same year, keyboardist Willie Dowling – who had previously performed on Earth vs the Wildhearts – joined the Wildhearts' touring lineup. In July, CJ was fired from the Wildhearts due to "personal reasons", with Ginger claiming: "We fell out on the last tour and haven't really got on for the last two years." In his place, former Vai guitarist Devin Townsend joined as touring guitarist. Dowling played his last show with the Wildhearts at Reading Festival in August 1994, while Townsend remained for a European tour supporting Suicidal Tendencies in September.

The Wildhearts returned in early 1995 with temporary touring guitarist Mark Keds, who remained until July when he was fired for failing to turn up for a show. After a short period performing as a trio for the first time, the band introduced Jef Streatfield as CJ's permanent replacement in October 1995, who debuted on Endless, Nameless. Upon the album's release in October 1997, Ginger decided to disband the group due to drug addiction problems amongst certain band members. After their breakup, the band reformed on two occasions – first in October 1998 for a short tour of Japan, and again in August 1999 for a one-off show in the country.

=== 2001–2022 ===
After Ginger teased a reunion a couple of months earlier, in April 2001 it was announced that the Wildhearts would return for a string of UK shows that June. The lineup was completed with the additions of guitarist CJ Wildheart, bassist Danny McCormack and drummer Andrew "Stidi" Stidolph, marking a reunion of the Earth vs the Wildhearts incarnation of the group. Early into the first tour, however, McCormack was forced to leave due to ongoing problems with heroin addiction, with Toshi Ogawa temporarily taking his place. By late August, McCormack had returned to the band. Due to the bassist's ongoing struggles, however, Ginger performed bass on the band's next album, 2003's The Wildhearts Must Be Destroyed. During a tour in April 2003, prior to the album's release, McCormack left again to enter rehabilitation, with "Random" Jon Poole taking his place.

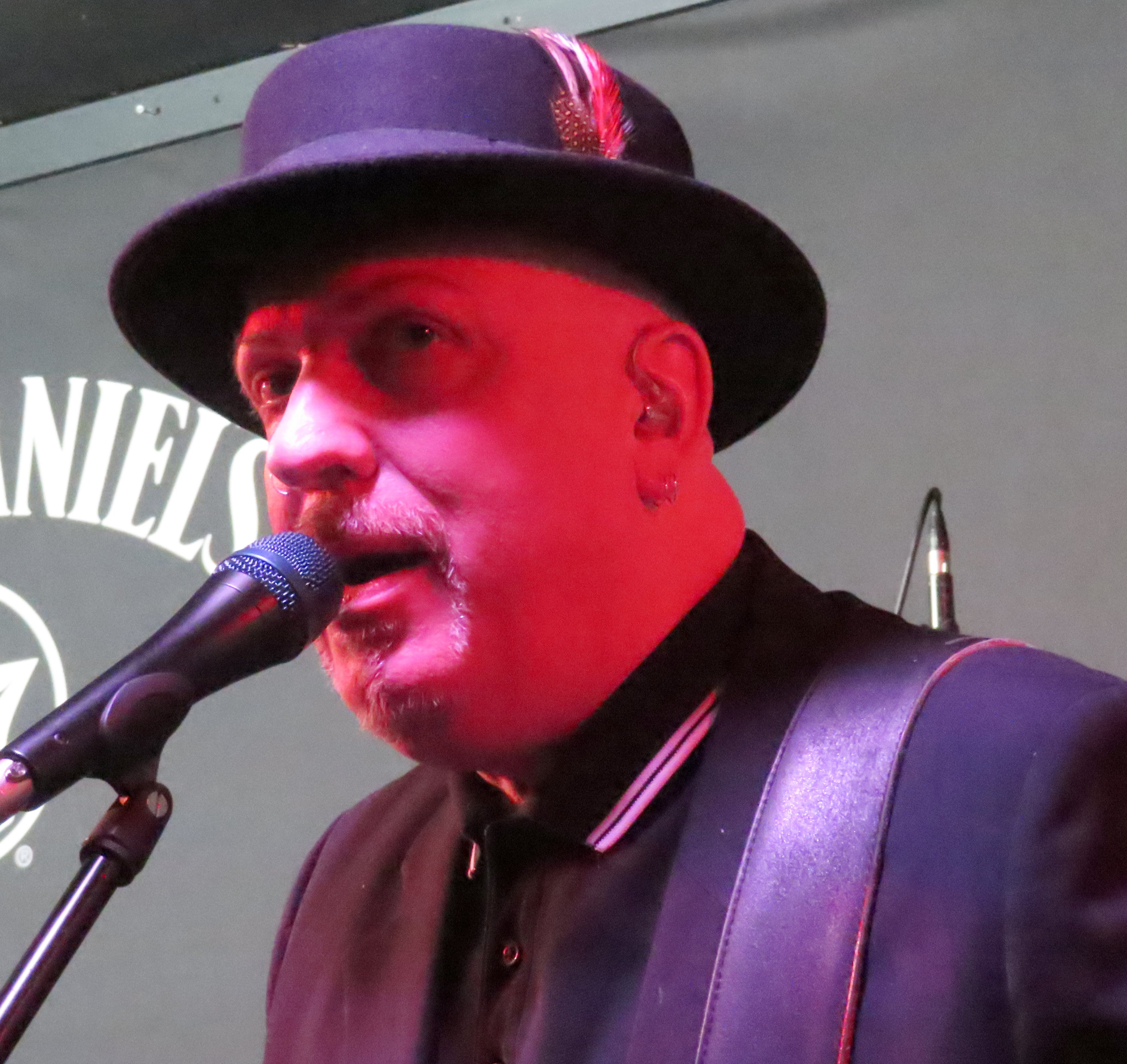
"Random" Jon Poole has been the Wildhearts' bassist for multiple tenures since 2003.

With new bassist Poole, the Wildhearts toured until the end of 2004. In early 2005, Ginger briefly joined Brides of Destruction, although assured that the Wildhearts were not breaking up. The band returned in July, with Ginger and CJ reuniting with McCormack and drummer Ritch Battersby for a one-off performance at In the Castle festival in September. A year-long unofficial hiatus followed, before the band were joined by bassist Scott Sorry in November 2006, with whom Ginger had briefly worked in Brides of Destruction. Sorry performed on 2007's The Wildhearts, 2008's Stop Us If You've Heard This One Before, Vol 1. and 2009's ¡Chutzpah!, before the band went on another hiatus when Ginger joined Michael Monroe's solo touring band. Ahead of a return gig in December 2012, Sorry was replaced by the returning Poole.

Sorry returned in November 2013. Ahead of a P.H.U.Q. anniversary tour in 2015, Poole returned again. After appearing as a guest during some of the band's encores, McCormack rejoined the band in early 2018 for the Britrock Must Be Destroyed tour. The band released Renaissance Men, their first album in ten years, in 2019. This was followed in 2021 by 21st Century Love Songs. By March 2022, the group had disbanded again due to "ongoing issues within the band".

=== Since 2024 ===
In January 2024, the Wildhearts announced that they were returning for a show that June, unveiling a new lineup featuring returning bassist Jon Poole, new guitarist Ben Marsden and fill-in drummer Pontus Snibb, before Charles Evans joined full-time as drummer.

== Members ==
=== Current ===
Image	Name	Years active	Instruments	Release contributions
	Ginger Wildheart (David Walls)	1989–1997; 1998; 1999; 2001–2022; 2024–present	guitar; vocals (lead since 1991; backing 1989–1991)	all Wildhearts releases
	"Random" Jon Poole	2003–2005; 2012–2013; 2015–2018; 2024–present	bass; backing vocals	The Wildhearts Strike Back (2004); Rock City vs the Wildhearts (2014); Never Outdrunk, Never Outsung: PHUQ Live (2016); Cuts So Deep (2021); Dÿnämizer (2022); Satanic Rites of the Wildhearts (2025)
	Ben Marsden	2024–present	guitar; backing vocals	Satanic Rites of the Wildhearts (2025)
	Charles Evans	2024–present	drums	none to date
	Carol Hodge	2024–present	keyboards; occasional lead vocals	Satanic Rites of the Wildhearts (2025) (as guest)

=== Former ===
Image	Name	Years active	Instruments	Release contributions
	CJ Wildheart (Chris Jagdhar)	1989–1994; 2001–2022	guitar; backing vocals	all Wildhearts releases from Mondo Akimbo a-Go-Go (1992) to P.H.U.Q. (1995), and from "Stormy in the North, Karma in the South" (2003) to AD/HD Rock (2022); Anarchic Airwaves: The Wildhearts at the BBC (1998)
	Julien "Joolz" Dean	1989–1991	bass; backing vocals	The Wildhearts (2007) – guest appearance on backing vocals
	Stuart "Snake" Neale	1989–1990; 1990–1991 (died 2006)	lead vocals	none
	Andrew "Stidi" Stidolph	1989–1990; 1992–1993; 2001–2005	drums	Earth vs the Wildhearts (1993); Anarchic Airwaves: The Wildhearts at the BBC (1998) – four tracks only; "Stormy in the North, Karma in the South" (2003); The Wildhearts Must Be Destroyed (2003); The Wildhearts Strike Back (2004); Cuts So Deep (2021); Dÿnämizer (2022)
	Pat "Panache" Walters	1990–1991	drums	none
	Dunken Francis Mullett	1990	lead vocals	none
	Danny McCormack	1991–1997; 1998; 1999; 2001–2003; 2005 (one-off); 2018–2022	bass; backing and occasional lead vocals	all Wildhearts releases from Mondo Akimbo a-Go-Go (1992) to "Stormy in the North, Karma in the South" (2003); Geordie in Wonderland (2006); Renaissance Men (2019); Diagnosis (2019); 30 Year Itch (2020); 21st Century Love Songs (2021); AD/HD Rock (2022)
	Bam Ross	1991–1992	drums	Mondo Akimbo a-Go-Go (1992); Don't Be Happy... Just Worry (1992)
	Ritch Battersby	1993–1997; 1998; 1999; 2005–2022	drums; backing vocals	all Wildhearts releases from "Caffeine Bomb" (1994) to Tokyo Suits Me (1999), and from Geordie in Wonderland (2006) to 30 Year Itch (2020); 21st Century Love Songs (2021); AD/HD Rock (2022)
	Jef Streatfield	1995–1997; 1998; 1999	guitar; backing vocals	Endless, Nameless (1997); Anarchic Airwaves: The Wildhearts at the BBC (1998); Tokyo Suits Me (1999)
	Scott Sorry (Gerard Scott)	2006–2012; 2013–2015; (died 2025)	bass; backing vocals	all Wildhearts releases from The Wildhearts (2007) to ¡Chutzpah! Jnr. (2009)

=== Touring ===
Image	Name	Years active	Instruments	Details
	Willie Dowling	1994	keyboards; backing vocals	Dowling joined the touring lineup of the Wildhearts in early 1994. He had previously performed on Earth vs the Wildhearts and later featured on Fishing for Luckies and P.H.U.Q.
	Devin Townsend	1994	guitar; backing vocals	After guitarist CJ Wildheart was fired in July 1994, Townsend joined the Wildhearts' touring lineup. He remained until the final tour dates of the year in September.
	Mark Keds	1995 (died 2021)	guitar; backing vocals	When the band returned to touring in early 1995, the role of second guitarist was taken by Keds. He was confirmed as a member of the band in the summer, but was fired in July for not turning up for a show.
	Toshi Ogawa	2001	bass; backing vocals	Shortly after the Wildhearts embarked on their reunion tour in June 2001, Danny McCormack was forced to leave due to problems with heroin addiction. He was replaced by Ogawa until late-August.
	Pontus Snibb	2024	drums; backing vocals	Snibb performed at a one off show in June 2024.

== Line-ups ==
Period	Members	Releases
August 1989 – 1990	Stuart "Snake" Neale – lead vocals; Ginger Wildheart – guitar, backing vocals; CJ Wildheart – guitar, backing vocals; Julien "Joolz" Dean – bass; Andrew "Stidi" Stidolph – drums	none
1990	Stuart "Snake" Neale – lead vocals; Ginger Wildheart – guitar, backing vocals; CJ Wildheart – guitar, backing vocals; Julien "Joolz" Dean – bass; Pat "Panache" Walters – drums	none
1990	Dunken Francis Mullett – lead vocals; Ginger Wildheart – guitar, backing vocals; CJ Wildheart – guitar, backing vocals; Julien "Joolz" Dean – bass; Pat "Panache" Walters – drums	none
1990 – March 1991	Stuart "Snake" Neal – lead vocals; Ginger Wildheart – guitar, backing vocals; CJ Wildheart – guitar, backing vocals; Julien "Joolz" Dean – bass; Pat "Panache" Walters – drums	none
March – mid-1991	Ginger Wildheart – lead vocals, guitar; CJ Wildheart – guitar, backing vocals; Julien "Joolz" Dean – bass; Pat "Panache" Walters – drums	none
Mid – October 1991	Ginger Wildheart – lead vocals, guitar; CJ Wildheart – guitar, backing vocals; Danny McCormack – bass, backing vocals; Pat "Panache" Walters – drums	none
October 1991 – November 1992	Ginger Wildheart – lead vocals, guitar; CJ Wildheart – guitar, backing vocals; Danny McCormack – bass, backing vocals; Bam Ross – drums	Mondo Akimbo a-Go-Go (1992); Don't Be Happy... Just Worry (1992)
November 1992 – October 1993	Ginger Wildheart – lead vocals, guitar; CJ Wildheart – guitar, backing vocals; Danny McCormack – bass, backing vocals; Andrew "Stidi" Stidolph – drums	Earth vs the Wildhearts (1993); Anarchic Airwaves: The Wildhearts at the BBC (1998) – four tracks
October 1993 – March 1994	Ginger Wildheart – lead vocals, guitar; CJ Wildheart – guitar, backing vocals; Danny McCormack – bass, backing vocals; Ritch Battersby – drums, backing vocals	"Caffeine Bomb" (1994); Fishing for Luckies (1994) – select tracks; Anarchic Airwaves: The Wildhearts at the BBC (1998) – five tracks
March – July 1994	Ginger Wildheart – lead vocals, guitar; CJ Wildheart – guitar, backing vocals; Danny McCormack – bass, backing vocals; Ritch Battersby – drums, backing vocals; Willie Dowling – keyboards (touring only)	Fishing for Luckies (1994) – select tracks; P.H.U.Q. (1995) – select tracks
July – August 1994 (temporary touring lineup)	Ginger Wildheart – lead vocals, guitar; Devin Townsend – guitar (touring only); Danny McCormack – bass, backing vocals; Ritch Battersby – drums, backing vocals; Willie Dowling – keyboards (touring only)	P.H.U.Q. (1995) – select tracks; Anarchic Airwaves: The Wildhearts at the BBC (1998) – two tracks
August – September 1994 (temporary touring lineup)	Ginger Wildheart – lead vocals, guitar; Devin Townsend – guitar (touring only); Danny McCormack – bass, backing vocals; Ritch Battersby – drums, backing vocals	none
January – July 1995 (temporary touring lineup)	Ginger Wildheart – lead vocals, guitar; Mark Keds – guitar (touring only); Danny McCormack – bass, backing vocals; Ritch Battersby – drums, backing vocals	none
July – September 1995 (temporary touring lineup)	Ginger Wildheart – lead vocals, guitar; Danny McCormack – bass, backing vocals; Ritch Battersby – drums, backing vocals	none
October 1995 – October 1997	Ginger Wildheart – lead vocals, guitar; Jef Streatfield – guitar, backing vocals; Danny McCormack – bass, backing vocals; Ritch Battersby – drums, backing vocals	Endless, Nameless (1997); Anarchic Airwaves: The Wildhearts at the BBC (1998) – five tracks
Band inactive November 1997 – September 1998
October 1998 (temporary touring lineup)	Ginger Wildheart – lead vocals, guitar; Jef Streatfield – guitar, backing vocals; Danny McCormack – bass, backing vocals; Ritch Battersby – drums, backing vocals	Tokyo Suits Me (1999)
Band inactive November 1998 – July 1999
August 1999 (one-off live performance)	Ginger Wildheart – lead vocals, guitar; Jef Streatfield – guitar, backing vocals; Danny McCormack – bass, backing vocals; Ritch Battersby – drums, backing vocals	none
Band inactive September 1999 – February 2001
March – June 2001	Ginger Wildheart – lead vocals, guitar; CJ Wildheart – guitar, backing vocals; Danny McCormack – bass, backing vocals; Andrew "Stidi" Stidolph – drums	none
June – August 2001 (temporary touring lineup)	Ginger Wildheart – lead vocals, guitar; CJ Wildheart – guitar, backing vocals; Toshi Ogawa – bass (touring only); Andrew "Stidi" Stidolph – drums	none
August 2001 – April 2003	Ginger Wildheart – lead vocals, guitar; CJ Wildheart – guitar, backing vocals; Danny McCormack – bass, backing vocals; Andrew "Stidi" Stidolph – drums	Riff After Riff (2002); The Wildhearts Must Be Destroyed (2003)
April 2003 – July 2005	Ginger Wildheart – lead vocals, guitar; CJ Wildheart – guitar, backing vocals; Jon Poole – bass, backing vocals; Andrew "Stidi" Stidolph – drums	The Wildhearts Strike Back (2004); Cuts So Deep (2021); Dÿnämizer (2022)
July – September 2005 (temporary touring lineup)	Ginger Wildheart – lead vocals, guitar; CJ Wildheart – guitar, backing vocals; Danny McCormack – bass, backing vocals; Ritch Battersby – drums, backing vocals	Geordie in Wonderland (2006)
November 2006 – December 2012	Ginger Wildheart – lead vocals, guitar; CJ Wildheart – guitar, backing vocals; Scott Sorry – bass, backing vocals; Ritch Battersby – drums, backing vocals	The Wildhearts (2007); Stop Us If You've Heard This One Before, Vol. 1 (2008); "Borderline" (2008); ¡Chutzpah! (2009); ¡Chutzpah! Jnr. (2009)
December 2012 – November 2013	Ginger Wildheart – lead vocals, guitar; CJ Wildheart – guitar, backing vocals; Jon Poole – bass, backing vocals; Ritch Battersby – drums, backing vocals	Rock City vs the Wildhearts (2014)
November 2013 – spring 2015	Ginger Wildheart – lead vocals, guitar; CJ Wildheart – guitar, backing vocals; Scott Sorry – bass, backing vocals; Ritch Battersby – drums, backing vocals	none
Spring 2015 – early 2018	Ginger Wildheart – lead vocals, guitar; CJ Wildheart – guitar, backing vocals; Jon Poole – bass, backing vocals; Ritch Battersby – drums, backing vocals	Never Outdrunk, Never Outsung: PHUQ Live (2016)
Early 2018 – March 2022	Ginger Wildheart – lead vocals, guitar; CJ Wildheart – guitar, backing vocals; Danny McCormack – bass, backing vocals; Ritch Battersby – drums, backing vocals	Renaissance Men (2019); Diagnosis (2019); 30 Year Itch (2020); 21st Century Love Songs (2021); AD/HD Rock (2022)
Band inactive April 2022 – December 2023
January 2024 – present	Ginger Wildheart – lead vocals, guitar; Ben Marsden – guitar, backing vocals; Jon Poole – bass, backing vocals; Pontus Snibb – drums, backing vocals	none
June 2024 – early 2025	Ginger Wildheart – lead vocals, guitar; Ben Marsden – guitar, backing vocals; Jon Poole – bass, backing vocals	Satanic Rites of the Wildhearts (2025)
early 2025 – present	Ginger Wildheart – lead vocals, guitar; Ben Marsden – guitar, backing vocals; Jon Poole – bass, backing vocals; Charles Evans – drums, backing vocals	none to date
