= The Wildhearts discography =

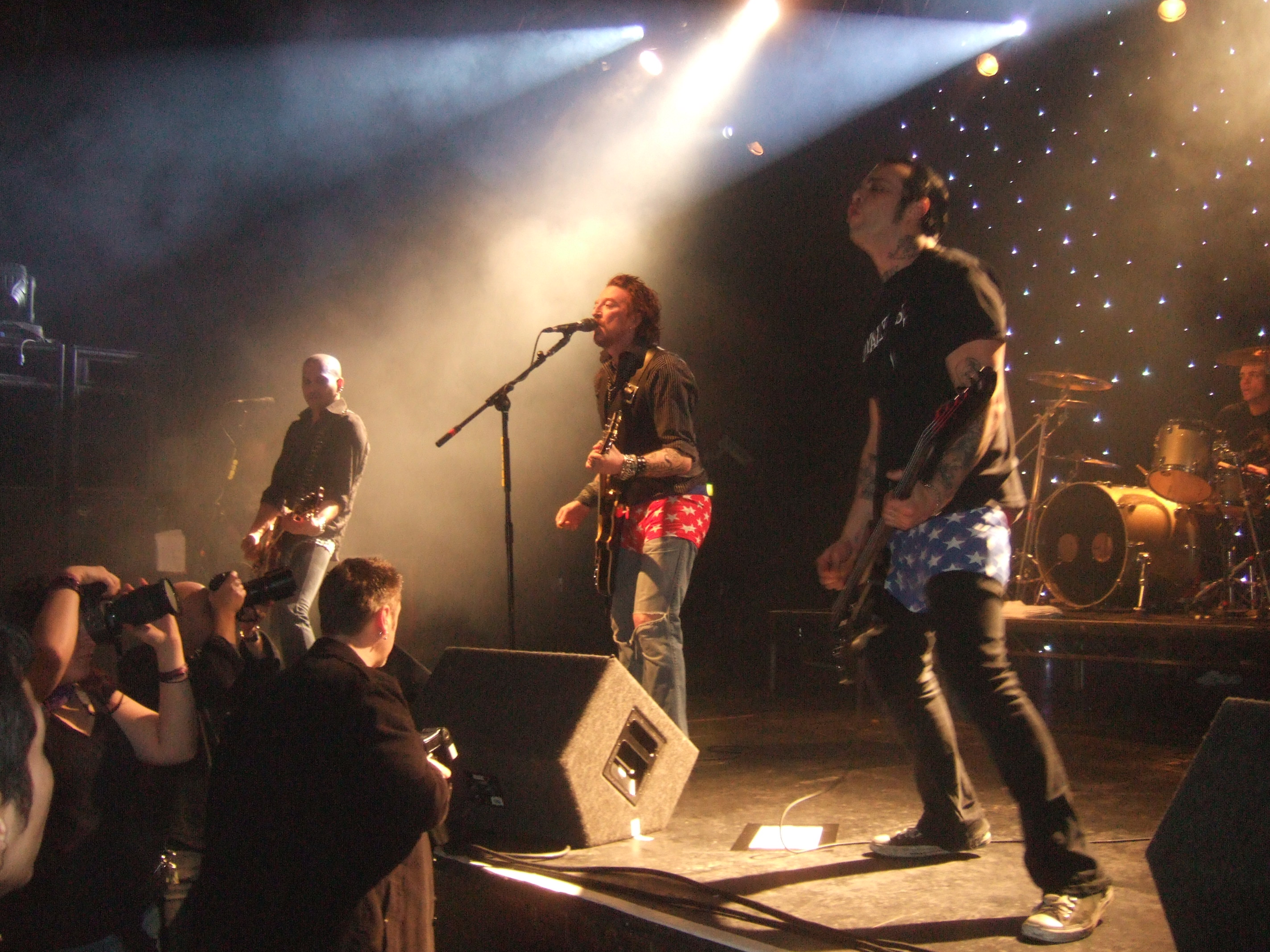
- The Wildhearts performing live in 2007.
- Studio albums: 11
- Extended plays: 7
- Live albums: 9
- Compilation albums: 11
- Singles: 25
- Video albums: 4
- Music videos: 17

The Wildhearts are a British rock band from Newcastle upon Tyne. Since their formation in 1989, the band have released eleven studio albums, nine live albums, 11 compilation albums, seven extended plays (EPs), 25 singles, four video albums and 17 music videos.

After debuting in 1992 with the EPs Mondo Akimbo a-Go-Go and Don't Be Happy... Just Worry, the Wildhearts released their full-length debut Earth vs the Wildhearts in 1993 on East West and Bronze Records, reaching number 46 on the UK Albums Chart. The album was reissued in 1994 with the addition of "Caffeine Bomb", the band's first UK Singles Chart top 40 release. The next year saw the group break the top 20 on both charts for the first time, with the release of P.H.U.Q. and lead single "I Wanna Go Where the People Go", which charted at number 6 and 16 on their respective charts. Fishing for Luckies, which originally received a limited release in 1994, was reissued in 1996 and reached number 16 on the UK Albums Chart, with lead single "Sick of Drugs" reaching number 14.

The Wildhearts released Endless, Nameless on Mushroom Records in 1997, which peaked at number 46 in the UK; both singles from the album made the top 30 of the UK Singles Chart. The band subsequently went on hiatus, before returning in 2003 with Gut Records release The Wildhearts Must Be Destroyed, which charted at number 54 in the UK and number 38 in Japan – their only release to break the country's albums chart top 40. The same year, the group reached the UK Singles Chart top 20 for the third and final time with "Stormy in the North, Karma in the South". In 2007, the Wildhearts issued their self-titled sixth studio album on Round Records, which peaked at number 55 on the UK Albums Chart. The 2008 follow-up Stop Us If You've Heard This One Before, Vol 1., an album of cover versions, failed to register on the main UK chart but reached the top 20 of both the UK Independent Albums and the UK Rock & Metal Albums Charts.

2009 saw the band release eighth album ¡Chutzpah! on Backstage Alliance, which charted in the UK at number 53 and topped the UK Rock & Metal Albums Chart. The Wildhearts did not release another album until ten years later, when 2019's Renaissance Men peaked at number 11 on the UK Albums Chart – the band's highest position since 1995. Diagnosis, an EP/mini album issued later that year, reached number 25. 21st Century Love Songs, released in 2021, gave the group their second UK top 10 album when it peaked at number 9. All three aforementioned releases reached the top ten in Scotland, with 21st Century Love Songs peaking at number 2.

== Albums ==
=== Studio albums ===
List of studio albums, with selected chart positions
Title	Album details	Peak chart positions								
Title	Album details	UK	UK Down.	UK Indie	UK Phys.	UK Rock	UK Sales	UK Vinyl	JPN	SCO
Earth vs the Wildhearts	Released: 31 August 1993; Label: East West/Bronze; Formats: CD, LP, cassette	46	—	—	—	22	—	39	—	—
Fishing for Luckies	Released: 12 December 1994 (Note: Fishing for Luckies originally received a limited edition mail order-only release. It was later reissued by Round Records in 1996 with more tracks, which was the version that charted.); Label: East West; Format: CD	16	—	—	16	2	—	—	—	30
P.H.U.Q.	Released: 22 May 1995; Label: East West; Formats: CD, LP, cassette	6	—	—	6	1	—	—	—	14
Endless, Nameless	Released: 27 October 1997; Label: Mushroom; Formats: CD, LP, cassette	41	—	4	41	1	—	—	46	58
The Wildhearts Must Be Destroyed	Released: 25 August 2003; Label: Gut; Formats: CD, LP	54	—	7	54	4	—	—	38	51
The Wildhearts	Released: 23 April 2007; Label: Round; Formats: CD, 2LP	55	—	4	52	—	—	—	—	67
Stop Us If You've Heard This One Before, Vol 1.	Released: 19 May 2008; Label: Round; Format: CD	—	48	16	—	20	—	—	—	—
¡Chutzpah!	Released: 31 August 2009; Label: Backstage Alliance; Format: CD	53	52	7	62	1	—	—	—	65
Renaissance Men	Released: 3 May 2019; Label: Graphite; Formats: CD, LP, digital	11	6	2	4	2	4	3	—	4
21st Century Love Songs	Released: 3 September 2021; Label: Graphite; Formats: CD, LP, digital	9	2	4	3	2	3	3	—	2
Satanic Rites of the Wildhearts	Released: 7 March 2025; Label: Snakefarm; Formats: CD, LP, cassette, digital	29	10	2	4	2	4	5	—	4
"—" denotes a release that did not chart or was not issued in that region.

=== Live albums ===
List of live albums, with selected chart positions
Title	Album details	Peak chart positions							
Title	Album details	UK	UK Indie	UK Phys.	UK Rock	UK Sales	UK Vinyl	JPN	SCO
Anarchic Airwaves: The Wildhearts at the BBC	Released: 16 March 1998; Label: Kuro Neko; Formats: CD, 2CD, 2LP	—	31	—	—	—	—	—	—
Tokyo Suits Me (released in Japan only)	Released: 27 January 1999; Label: Mercury; Format: 2CD	—	—	—	18	—	—	—	—
The Wildhearts Strike Back	Released: 25 October 2004; Label: Gut; Formats: 2CD, 2LP	158	—	—	18	—	—	—	—
Geordie in Wonderland	Released: 24 July 2006; Label: Secret; Format: CD	—	34	—	—	—	—	—	—
Rock City vs the Wildhearts	Released: 8 April 2014; Label: Round; Format: 2CD	—	—	—	—	—	—	—	—
Never Outdrunk, Never Outsung: PHUQ Live	Released: 1 July 2016; Label: Round; Formats: 2CD, 2LP, digital	—	—	—	—	—	—	—	—
Live in the Studio Remastered	Released: 25 January 2019; Label: Round; Formats: CD, digital	—	—	—	—	—	—	—	—
30 Year Itch	Released: 25 September 2020; Label: Round; Formats: 2CD, 2LP, digital	51	8	33	2	33	20	—	24
Dÿnämizer (split with Ginger Wildheart)	Released: March 2022; Label: Round; Formats: 2CD, 2LP, digital	—	—	—	—	—	—	—	—
"—" denotes a release that did not chart or was not issued in that region.

=== Compilations ===
List of compilation albums, with selected chart positions
Title	Album details	Peak chart positions				
Title	Album details	UK	UK Indie	UK Rock	JPN	SCO
The Best of the Wildhearts	Released: 25 November 1996; Label: East West; Formats: CD, cassette	—	—	—	48	—
Moodswings and Roundabouts (released in Japan only)	Released: 25 January 1998; Label: East West; Format: 4CD	—	—	—	—	—
Anthem: The Single Tracks (released in Japan only)	Released: 21 March 1998; Label: BMG; Format: CD	—	—	—	—	—
Landmines and Pantomimes	Released: 28 September 1998; Label: Kuro Neko; Format: CD	—	—	—	—	—
Riff After Riff After Motherfucking Riff (released in Japan only)	Released: 23 October 2002 (Note: Riff After Riff After Motherfucking Riff was issued in the United States by Gearhead Records in 2004, under the title Riff After Riff and with more tracks.); Label: Universal; Format: CD	—	—	—	—	—
Coupled With	Released: 29 March 2004; Label: Gut; Formats: CD, LP	110	9	13	—	81
The Works	Released: 31 March 2008; Label: Rhino; Format: 3CD	—	—	—	—	—
Acoustic Albums Are Shit	Released: 3 March 2023; Label: Round; Format: digital	—	—	—	—	—
Acoustic Albums Are Shit, Vol. 2	Released: 7 April 2023; Label: Round; Format: digital	—	—	—	—	—
Acoustic Albums Are Shit, Vol. 3	Released: 5 May 2023; Label: Round; Format: digital	—	—	—	—	—
Acoustic Albums Are Shit, Vol. 4	Released: 4 August 2023; Label: Round; Format: digital	—	—	—	—	—
"—" denotes a release that did not chart or was not issued in that region.

== Extended plays ==
List of extended plays, with selected chart positions
Title	Album details	Peak chart positions							
Title	Album details	UK	UK Down.	UK Indie	UK Phys.	UK Rock	UK Sales	UK Vinyl	SCO
Mondo Akimbo a-Go-Go	Released: 20 April 1992; Label: East West/Bronze; Formats: CD, 12" vinyl	86	—	—	—	—	—	—	—
Don't Be Happy... Just Worry	Released: 23 November 1992; Label: East West/Bronze; Formats: CD, 12" vinyl	91	—	—	—	—	—	—	—
¡Chutzpah! Jnr.	Released: 2 December 2009; Label: Backstage Alliance; Format: CD	—	—	—	—	—	—	—	—
Diagnosis	Released: 4 October 2019; Label: Graphite; Formats: CD, 10" vinyl, digital	25	11	4	9	2	9	6	9
30 Year Itch Bonus Tracks	Released: 25 September 2020; Label: Round; Formats: CD, digital	—	—	—	—	—	—	—	—
Cuts So Deep	Released: 17 July 2021; Label: Round; Format: 12" vinyl	—	—	18	57	8	64	35	50
AD/HD Rock	Released: 23 April 2022; Label: Graphite; Format: 10" vinyl	—	—	—	21 (Note: AD/HD Rock charted on the UK Physical Singles, Singles Sales, and Vinyl Singles Charts, rather than their album equivalents.)	—	64	20	—
"—" denotes a release that did not chart or was not issued in that region.

== Singles ==
List of singles, with selected chart positions, showing year released and album name
Title	Year	Peak positions			Album
Title	Year	UK	UK Indie	UK Rock	Album
"Greetings from Shitsville"	1993	81	—	-	Earth vs the Wildhearts
"TV Tan"	1993	53	—	—	Earth vs the Wildhearts
"Caffeine Bomb"	1994	31	—	—	Earth vs the Wildhearts
"Suckerpunch"	1994	38	—	—	Earth vs the Wildhearts
"If Life Is Like a Lovebank I Want an Overdraft" "Geordie in Wonderland"	1995	31	—	—	Fishing for Luckies
"I Wanna Go Where the People Go"	1995	16	—	1	P.H.U.Q.
"Just in Lust"	1995	28	—	—	P.H.U.Q.
"Sick of Drugs"	1996	14	—	3	Fishing for Luckies (1996 reissue)
"Red Light – Green Light"	1996	30	—	2	Fishing for Luckies (1996 reissue)
"Anthem"	1997	21	—	1	Endless, Nameless
"Urge"	1997	26	2	—	Endless, Nameless
"Vanilla Radio"	2002	26	3	—	The Wildhearts Must Be Destroyed
"Stormy in the North, Karma in the South"	2003	17	5	1	Non-album single
"So into You"	2003	22	3	3	The Wildhearts Must Be Destroyed
"Top of the World"	2003	26	2	3	The Wildhearts Must Be Destroyed
"The Sweetest Song"	2007	—	—	—	The Wildhearts
"The New Flesh"	2007	—	5	—	The Wildhearts
"Borderline"	2008	—	—	—	Non-album single
"The Only One"	2009	—	—	—	¡Chutzpah!
"The Snake, the Lion, the Monkey and the Spider"	2009	—	—	—	¡Chutzpah! Jnr.
"Zeen Requiem"	2009	—	—	—	¡Chutzpah! Jnr.
"Dislocated"	2019	—	—	—	Renaissance Man
"Remember These Days"	2021	—	—	—	21st Century Love Songs
"Sort Your Fucking Shit Out"	2021	—	—	—	21st Century Love Songs
"Sleepaway"	2021	—	—	—	21st Century Love Songs
"—" denotes a release that did not chart or was not issued in that region.

== Videos ==
=== Video albums ===
List of video albums, with selected chart positions
Title	Album details	Peak
Title	Album details	UK
The Best of the Wildhearts: Video Collection (released in Japan only)	Released: 25 June 1997; Label: Warner Vision/East West; Format: VHS	—
Live at Scarborough Castle	Released: 23 October 2006; Label: Secret; Format: DVD	42
Live in the Studio	Released: 20 October 2008; Label: Round; Format: DVD	16
Earth versus the Wildhearts: Live 2014	Released: 2016; Label: Round; Format: DVD	—
"—" denotes a release that did not chart or was not issued in that region.

=== Music videos ===
List of music videos, showing year released, director(s) and album name
Title	Year	Album	Director(s)	Ref.
"Nothing Ever Changes But the Shoes"	1992	Mondo Akimbo a-Go-Go	John Mills	
"TV Tan"	1993	Earth vs. The Wildhearts	Run Wrake, Nick Burgess-Jones	
"Caffeine Bomb"	1994	Earth vs. The Wildhearts	Stephen Wells, Nick Small	
"Suckerpunch"	1994	Earth vs. The Wildhearts	Peter Christopherson	
"If Life Is Like a Lovebank, I Want an Overdraft"	1995	Fishing for Luckies	Philip Richardson	
"I Wanna Go Where the People Go"	1995	P.H.U.Q.	Pamela Birkhead	
"Just in Lust"	1995	P.H.U.Q.	Tim Searle	
"Sick of Drugs"	1996	Fishing for Luckies (1996 reissue)	Philip Richardson	
"Red Light – Green Light"	1996	Fishing for Luckies (1996 reissue)	Philip Richardson	
"Anthem"	1997	Endless, Nameless	unknown	
"Urge"	1997	Endless, Nameless	unknown	
"Vanilla Radio"	2002	The Wildhearts Must Be Destroyed	unknown	
"So into You"	2003	The Wildhearts Must Be Destroyed	unknown	
"Top of the World"	2003	The Wildhearts Must Be Destroyed	unknown	
"The Sweetest Song"	2007	The Wildhearts	unknown	
"The New Flesh"	2007	The Wildhearts	Nick Small	
"Sleepaway"	2021	21st Century Love Songs	Justin Griffiths	
"Troubadour Moon"	2025	Satanic Rites Of The Wildhearts	Shaun Hodson	
