= 30 Year Itch =

Live album by the Wildhearts
- Released: 25 September 2020
- Recorded: 2019
- Genre: Hard rock
- Length: 1:12:54
- Label: Round
- Producer: Dave Draper

The Wildhearts chronology
Diagnosis (2019)	30 Year Itch (2020)	Cuts So Deep (2021)

30 Year Itch is a live album by British rock band the Wildhearts. Recorded during 2019 tours to promote Renaissance Men and Diagnosis, it was produced by Dave Draper and released by Round Records on 25 September 2020 (digital) and 4 December 2020 (physical). The album reached number 51 on the UK Albums Chart and registered on several other UK charts. A separate EP entitled 30 Year Itch Bonus Tracks was released free to people who pre-ordered the album.

== Background ==
In promotion of the band's ninth studio album Renaissance Men, the Wildhearts embarked on a short UK tour starting on the day of its release, 3 May 2019. After a string of shows and festival appearances across Europe and Japan in the summer, the group toured the UK again on the Renaissance Men Tour Part II in October. Ahead of the second part of the tour, the Wildhearts released the EP Diagnosis as a follow-up to Renaissance Men.

30 Year Itch was recorded and produced by Dave Draper, who had previously worked on the Wildhearts' last live album, 2016's Never Outdrunk, Never Outsung: PHUQ Live. The digital download version of the album was released on 25 September 2020; the physical version was delayed to the issues arising from the COVID-19 pandemic. It was eventually released on 4 December 2020. People who pre-ordered the album were sent four extra live tracks called 30 Year Itch Bonus Tracks.

== Reception ==
=== Commercial ===
30 Year Itch was the Wildhearts' first live album to register on the main UK Albums Chart, reaching number 51. It also reached number 24 on the Scottish Albums Chart, number 2 on the UK Rock & Metal Albums Chart, number 8 on the UK Independent Albums Chart, number 20 on the UK Vinyl Albums Chart, and number 33 on the UK Albums Sales and Physical Albums Charts.

=== Critical ===
Professional ratings
Review scores
Source	Rating
Classic Rock	4/5 stars

30 Year Itch received positive reviews from critics. Writing for Classic Rock magazine, Essi Berelian described the album as "loud, atmospheric and buzzing with furious energy", and claimed that "the joyful racket of these 17 tracks is something to behold". Similarly, MMH Radio writer Simon Kidd described 30 Year Itch as "an essential purchase", suggesting that "This is not only a truly great live record; it is absolutely the best live album of the past 20 years". A review published by Get Ready to Rock! dubbed 30 Year Itch "a must play", with the author claiming that "you won't be disappointed, but it may leave you hankering to be in that crowd".

== Track listing ==
All tracks are written by Ginger Wildheart, except where noted.

No.	Title	Writer(s)	Length
1.	"Dislocated"		5:56
2.	"Everlone"		6:23
3.	"Suckerpunch"		3:00
4.	"Anthem"	G. Wildheart; Jef Streatfield; Danny McCormack; Ritch Battersby	3:40
5.	"Diagnosis"		5:42
6.	"TV Tan"		4:14
7.	"The Jackson Whites"	G. Wildheart; CJ Wildheart; Scott Sorry; Battersby	3:25
8.	"Let 'Em Go"		4:11
9.	"Vanilla Radio"		3:07
10.	"Urge"		4:41
11.	"Mazel Tov Cocktail"	G. Wildheart; CJ Wildheart; Sorry; Battersby	2:47
12.	"Sick of Drugs"		4:31
13.	"Someone Who Won't Let Me Go"		3:06
14.	"The Revolution Will Be Televised"	G. Wildheart; CJ Wildheart; Sorry; Battersby	4:29
15.	"Caffeine Bomb"		2:54
16.	"Love U Til I Don't"		5:26
17.	"I Wanna Go Where the People Go"		5:22
Total length:			1:12:54

== Personnel ==
The Wildhearts

- Ginger Wildheart – lead vocals, guitar
- CJ Wildheart – guitar, backing vocals
- Danny McCormack – bass, backing vocals
- Ritch Battersby – drums

Additional personnel

- Dave Draper – production, engineering, mixing, mastering
- Elliot Vaughan – engineering
- Oli Scoble – engineering
- Rich Jones – design, layout
- Alan Kerr – cover illustration
- Adrian Hextall – photography
- Gordon Armstrong – photography
- Joachim Ljungh Stenström – photography
- Matthew Radford – photography
- Neil Vary – photography
- Sam Ryan – photography
- Tony Woolliscroft – photography
- Trudi Knight – photography

== Charts ==
Chart performance for 30 Year Itch
Chart (2020)	Peak position
Scottish Albums (OCC)	24
UK Albums (OCC)	51
UK Albums Sales (OCC)	33
UK Independent Albums (OCC)	8
UK Physical Albums (OCC)	33
UK Rock & Metal Albums (OCC)	2
UK Vinyl Albums (OCC)	20

== Bonus Tracks ==
People who pre-ordered the album directly from Round Records were sent 30 Year Itch Bonus Tracks, four live tracks not included on the final album.

Track listing

No.	Title	Length
1.	"Top of the World"
2.	"Shame on Me"
3.	"Nothing Ever Changes but the Shoes"
4.	"My Baby Is a Headfuck"
