= The Wildhearts Strike Back =

Live album by the Wildhearts
- Released: 25 October 2004
- Recorded: 25 April – 12 May 2004
- Venue: Liquid Room (Edinburgh); Leeds Metropolitan University (Leeds); Rock City (Nottingham); Carling Academy Liverpool (Liverpool); The Leadmill (Sheffield); Hammersmith Palais (London); Roadmender (Northampton); The Waterfront (Norwich)
- Genre: Hard rock; heavy metal
- Length: 1:31:00
- Label: Gut
- Producer: Jase Edwards

The Wildhearts chronology
Coupled With (2004)	The Wildhearts Strike Back (2004)	Geordie in Wonderland (2006)

The Wildhearts Strike Back is a live album by British rock band the Wildhearts. Recorded at various shows during a UK tour between April and May 2004, it was produced by Jase Edwards and released on 25 October 2004 by Gut Records. The album reached number 18 on the UK Rock & Metal Albums Chart.

== Background ==
The Wildhearts Strike Back is the band's first official live album released in the UK, following 1998's Anarchic Airwaves: The Wildhearts at the BBC, which is considered by the band not to be an official release, and 1999's Tokyo Suits Me, which was released in Japan only. It features recordings taken from a number of shows on a UK tour during April and May 2004, namely at Liquid Room in Edinburgh, Leeds Metropolitan University in Leeds, Rock City in Nottingham, the Carling Academy in Liverpool, The Leadmill in Sheffield, the Hammersmith Palais in London, the Roadmender in Northampton, and The Waterfront in Norwich. The double album was released on CD, enhanced CD and vinyl – the enhanced CD includes the music videos for "Vanilla Radio", "Top of the World", "Stormy in the North, Karma in the South", and "So into You".

== Reception ==
=== Commercial ===
The Wildhearts Strike Back registered at number 18 on the UK Rock & Metal Albums Chart.

=== Critical ===
The Wildhearts Strike Back received mixed reviews from critics. MusicOMH columnist Vik Bansal described the collection as "better than the majority of live albums you'll come across", but conceded that "the casual fan ... is pretty unlikely to shell out their hard-earned [money] on this". A review published in the Manchester Evening News claimed that "the 2004 tour dates documented on this double disc live album are a worthy illustration of the band's power and abilities", but suggested that "despite the high quality sound recording, most of the songs on The Wildhearts Strike Back suffer due to the neat and tidy way the album is constructed, demeaning the flow of a live concert". Conversely, a writer for the website Punktastic claimed that the use of recordings from multiple live shows "gives the album a better feel for the live experience that The Wildhearts have been famed for during their lengthy existence", concluding that "this is just about everything [the band] could want from a live album".

== Track listing ==
All tracks are written by Ginger, except where noted

Disc one; double vinyl disc one
No.	Title	Writer(s)	Length
1.	"I Wanna Go Where the People Go"		4:51
2.	"Greetings from Shitsville"		4:33
3.	"Top of the World"		3:47
4.	"Vanilla Radio"		3:19
5.	"Caffeine Bomb"		2:55
6.	"O.C.D."	Ginger; CJ; Andrew Stidolph	4:56
7.	"Someone That Won't Let Me Go"		3:43
8.	"Nita Nitro"		3:58
9.	"Caprice"		7:18
Total length:			39:20

Enhanced CD bonus videos
No.	Title	Writer(s)	Length
10.	"Vanilla Radio"		3:21
11.	"Top of the World"		4:39
12.	"Stormy in the North, Karma in the South"	Ginger; CJ	2:49
13.	"So into You"	Ginger; CJ	2:54
Total length:			55:03

Disc two
No.	Title	Writer(s)	Length
1.	"Girlfriend Clothes"		5:31
2.	"Jonesing for Jones"		4:46
3.	"Suckerpunch"		2:58
4.	"Beautiful Thing You"		4:11
5.	"Turning American"		6:01
6.	"My Baby Is a Headfuck"		4:29
7.	"Loch Ness Interlude"		0:59
8.	"Cheers"	Gary Portnoy; Judy Hart-Angelo; Bob James	4:01
9.	"Nothing Ever Changes but the Shoes"		5:03
10.	"Dangerlust"		6:02
11.	"Love U Til I Don't"		5:44
12.	"Don't Worry About Me"		1:55
Total length:			51:40

Double vinyl disc two
No.	Title	Length
1.	"Girlfriend Clothes"
2.	"Jonesing for Jones"
3.	"Suckerpunch"
4.	"Beautiful Thing You"
5.	"Weekend '96"
6.	"My Baby Is a Headfuck"
7.	"Nothing Ever Changes but the Shoes"
8.	"Love U Til I Don't"
9.	"Don't Worry About Me"

== Personnel ==
The Wildhearts

- Ginger Wildheart – lead vocals, guitar
- C. J. – guitar, backing vocals
- Jon Poole – bass, backing vocals
- Andrew "Stidi" Stidolph – drums

Additional personnel

- Jase Edwards – production
- Kevin Metcalfe – mastering
- Gordon Vicary – mastering
- Small Japanese Soldier – design, concept
- Tony Woolliscroft – photography
- Wayne Charlton – photography

== Charts ==
Chart performance for The Wildhearts Strike Back
Chart (2004)	Peak position
UK Rock & Metal Albums (OCC)	18
