= Geordie in Wonderland (album) =

Live album by the Wildhearts
- Released: 24 July 2006
- Recorded: 17 September 2005
- Venue: Scarborough Castle (Scarborough, England)
- Genre: Hard rock; heavy metal
- Length: 64:02
- Label: Secret
- Producer: Roger Lomas

The Wildhearts chronology
The Wildhearts Strike Back (2004)	Geordie in Wonderland (2006)	The Wildhearts (2007)

Geordie in Wonderland is a live album by British rock band the Wildhearts. Recorded on 17 September 2005 at Scarborough Castle in Scarborough, North Yorkshire, it was produced by Roger Lomas and released on 24 July 2006 by Secret Records. The album reached number 34 on the UK Independent Albums Chart. A corresponding video album was released under the title Live at Scarborough Castle on 23 October 2006, which reached number 42 on the UK Music Video Chart.

== Background ==
In the summer of 2005, the 1993–1994 lineup of the Wildhearts (Ginger Wildheart, CJ Wildheart, Danny McCormack and Ritch Battersby) reformed for a one-off performance at In the Castle, a festival held at Scarborough Castle in Scarborough, North Yorkshire on 17 September 2005. The band's full 15-song performance was documented on the album Geordie in Wonderland released by Secret Records on 24 July 2006, followed by the corresponding Secret Films video Live at Scarborough Castle on 23 October 2006. In 2014, Secret reissued the album and video together as a CD+DVD set entitled Mad, Bad and Dangerous to Know. The album was also issued on vinyl for the first time in 2018 under the title Best of Live, with "Nita Nitro", "Everlone", "My Baby Is a Headfuck" and "Love You Til I Don't" removed.

== Reception ==
=== Commercial ===
Geordie in Wonderland reached number 34 on the UK Independent Albums Chart and Live at Scarborough Castle reached number 42 on the UK Music Videos Chart.

=== Critical ===
Professional ratings
Review scores
Source	Rating
AllMusic	3.5/5 stars
Brave Words & Bloody Knuckles	7.0

Geordie in Wonderland received mixed reviews from critics. In a 3.5-star review for AllMusic, Greg Prato claimed that "The set does a fine job of capturing the group's powerful yet sleazy hard rock ... Geordie in Wonderland doesn't disappoint". Brave Words & Bloody Knuckles writer Mark Gromen awarded the album a rating of 7 out of 10, writing that "Nearly half the 15 songs are culled from their stellar Earth vs the Wildhearts debut, delivered in a pseudo-sloppy, rapid-fire rockabilly-meets-punk manner", suggesting that Ginger Wildheart's vocal performance on the album is "hoarse-voiced [and] off-kilter".

== Track listing ==
All tracks are written by Ginger Wildheart; track 5 co-written by CJ Wildheart

No.	Title	Length
1.	"I Wanna Go Where the People Go"	5:10
2.	"Sick of Drugs"	4:37
3.	"Greetings from Shitsville"	4:15
4.	"Nita Nitro"	3:54
5.	"Stormy in the North, Karma in the South"	3:09
6.	"TV Tan"	4:23
7.	"Nothing Ever Changes but the Shoes"	5:02
8.	"Everlone"	6:46
9.	"Geordie in Wonderland"	3:11
10.	"Vanilla Radio"	3:08
11.	"Caffeine Bomb"	3:35
12.	"Suckerpunch"	3:07
13.	"My Baby Is a Headfuck"	4:44
14.	"29 x the Pain"	3:26
15.	"Love You Til I Don't"	5:35
Total length:		64:02

== Personnel ==
The Wildhearts

- Ginger – lead vocals, guitar
- CJ – guitar, backing vocals
- Ritch – drums
- Danny McCormack – bass, backing vocals

Additional personnel

- Roger Lomas – production, engineering, mixing, mastering
- Meurig Rees – design
- Tabatha Fireman – photography

== Charts ==
Chart performance for Geordie in Wonderland and Live at Scarborough Castle
Chart (2006)	Peak position
Geordie in Wonderland
UK Independent Albums (OCC)	34
Live at Scarborough Castle
UK Music Videos (OCC)	42
