= Endless, Nameless =

Endless, Nameless may refer to:

- "Endless, Nameless" (song), a hidden track at the end of Nirvana's album Nevermind
- Endless, Nameless (album), a 1997 album by British rock band the Wildhearts
- An item from the video game The Binding of Isaac.
