= Never Outdrunk, Never Outsung: PHUQ Live =

Live album by the Wildhearts
- Released: 1 July 2016
- Recorded: 17 – 25 September 2015
- Venue: Rock City (Nottingham); Manchester Academy 1 (Manchester); O2 Academy Newcastle (Newcastle upon Tyne); O2 ABC (Glasgow); O2 Academy Leeds (Leeds); Wulfrun Hall (Wolverhampton); O2 Academy Bristol (Bristol); O2 Shepherd's Bush Empire (London)
- Genre: Hard rock
- Length: 70:55
- Label: Round
- Producer: Dave Draper

The Wildhearts chronology
Rock City vs the Wildhearts (2014)	Never Outdrunk, Never Outsung: PHUQ Live (2016)	Live in the Studio Remastered (2019)

Never Outdrunk, Never Outsung: PHUQ Live is a live album by British rock band the Wildhearts. Recorded at various shows during a UK tour to mark the 20th anniversary of P.H.U.Q. in September 2015, it was produced by Dave Draper and released on 1 July 2016 by Round Records.

== Background ==
In September 2015, the Wildhearts played a string of UK shows to mark the 20th anniversary of their third album P.H.U.Q. The tour included eight shows over nine days in Nottingham, Manchester, Newcastle upon Tyne, Glasgow, Leeds, Wolverhampton, Bristol and London. Never Outdrunk, Never Outsung features recordings from all shows on the tour; the album's title was coined by Wildhearts fan Tom Reed, as a reference to the band's "very loud and very thirsty" fanbase.

== Track listing ==
All tracks are written by Ginger Wildheart, except where noted

Disc one: PHUQ Live
No.	Title	Length
1.	"I Wanna Go Where the People Go"	4:59
2.	"V-Day"	5:08
3.	"Just in Lust"	3:31
4.	"Baby Strange"	0:49
5.	"Nita Nitro"	4:03
6.	"Jonesing for Jones"	4:45
7.	"Up Your Arse You Fucking Cunt"	0:26
8.	"Woah Shit, You Got Through"	3:07
9.	"Cold Patootie Tango"	1:46
10.	"Caprice"	6:20
11.	"Be My Drug"	5:10
12.	"Naivety Play"	3:13
13.	"In Lilly's Garden"	3:05
14.	"Getting It"	4:10
Total length:		50:32

Disc two: Bonus encore EP
No.	Title	Writer(s)	Length
1.	"Don't Worry 'Bout Me"		0:48
2.	"Weekend"		5:23
3.	"Stormy in the North, Karma in the South"	G. Wildheart; CJ Wildheart	3:01
4.	"Red Light – Green Light"		2:44
5.	"White Lies"	Perry Baggs; Larry Napier	3:22
6.	"29 x the Pain"		5:05
Total length:			20:23

== Personnel ==
The Wildhearts

- Ginger Wildheart – lead vocals, guitar
- CJ Wildheart – guitar, backing vocals
- "Random" Jon Poole – bass, backing vocals
- Ritch Battersby – drums

Additional personnel

- Dave Draper – production, engineering, mixing, mastering
- Elliot Vaughan – engineering
- Sean Tidy Ink – cover layout and design
- Dan Styles – cover artwork
- Trudi Knight – photography
