= Mournblade =

Mournblade may refer to:

- Mournblade (sword), a fictional sword from the books of Michael Moorcock, the "brother sword" of Stormbringer
- Mournblade (band), an English heavy metal band named after said sword
