= Rock City vs the Wildhearts =

Live album by the Wildhearts
- Released: 8 April 2014
- Recorded: 6 April 2013
- Venue: Rock City (Nottingham, England)
- Genre: Hard rock
- Length: 1:35:23
- Label: Round
- Producer: Rob Baldock

The Wildhearts chronology
¡Chutzpah! Jnr. (2009)	Rock City vs the Wildhearts (2014)	Never Outdrunk, Never Outsung: PHUQ Live (2016)

Rock City vs the Wildhearts is a live album by British rock band the Wildhearts. Recorded on 6 April 2013 at Rock City in Nottingham during a short UK tour to mark the 20th anniversary of Earth vs the Wildhearts, it was produced by Rob Baldock and released on 8 April 2014 by Round Records.

== Background ==
In April 2013, the Wildhearts played a string of UK shows to mark the 20th anniversary of their debut full-length album Earth vs the Wildhearts. Each show comprised two sets – the first a performance of the album in full, the second an "audience participation section" in which show attendees were able to choose the songs. After an initial run of just four shows, the band later added six more dates across two weekends in June 2013. Recordings from the Rock City, Nottingham show were recorded by Rob Baldock of Re:Live Recordings and released as Rock City vs the Wildhearts starting on the band's April 2014 tour.

== Track listing ==
All tracks are written by Ginger Wildheart

Disc one: Earth vs the Wildhearts
No.	Title	Length
1.	"Greetings from Shitsville"	5:50
2.	"TV Tan"	5:57
3.	"Everlone"	7:41
4.	"Shame on Me"	4:49
5.	"Loveshit"	4:27
6.	"The Miles Away Girl"	6:05
7.	"My Baby Is a Headfuck"	4:13
8.	"Suckerpunch"	3:24
9.	"News of the World"	5:11
10.	"Drinking About Life"	3:27
11.	"Love U 'Til I Don't"	5:37
Total length:		56:41

Disc two: Audience participation section
No.	Title	Length
1.	"Don't Worry 'Bout Me/29 x the Pain"	7:00
2.	"Red Light, Green Light"	3:14
3.	"Naivety Play"	3:56
4.	"Hate the World Day"	5:56
5.	"Turning American"	7:21
6.	"The Duck Song"	1:18
7.	"Caffeine Bomb"	3:27
8.	"I Wanna Go Where the People Go"	6:30
Total length:		38:42

== Personnel ==
The Wildhearts

- Ginger Wildheart – lead vocals, guitar
- CJ Wildheart – guitar, backing vocals
- "Random" Jon Poole – bass, backing vocals
- Ritch Battersby – drums, backing vocals

Additional personnel

- Rob Baldock – production, engineering
- Kevin Vanbergen – mixing
- Trudi Knight – photography
