= Geordie in Wonderland =

Geordie in Wonderland may refer to:

- "Geordie in Wonderland" (song), a song by The Wildhearts
- Geordie in Wonderland (album), a 1995 live album by The Wildhearts
