= Coupled With =

Compilation album by The Wildhearts
- Released: March 2004
- Genre: Hard rock, punk rock, heavy metal
- Label: Gut Records

The Wildhearts chronology
The Wildhearts Must Be Destroyed (2003)	Coupled With (2004)	The Wildhearts Strike Back (2004)

Coupled With is a compilation album by The Wildhearts, released on Gut Records in March 2004. The album collects almost all the B-sides recorded by the band, released on various CD and vinyl singles during their reformation and comeback in the 2001-2003 period. The A-sides of most of these single releases appear on the 2003 studio album The Wildhearts Must Be Destroyed. The exception to this pattern is "Stormy in the North, Karma in the South" which was recorded as a non-album A-side for its own single release. One B-side not included here is the instrumental version of "Dancin'" from the 7" single for "So Into You".

== Track listing ==
All songs written by Ginger unless noted otherwise.

1. "Stormy in the North, Karma in the South" (Ginger, C.J.)
2. "Move On"
3. "Cheers" (Portnoy, Angelo, James)
  - Medley of the themes from the American TV shows Taxi and Cheers ("Where Everybody Knows Your Name"). This track received much coverage on The Chris Moyles Show on BBC Radio 1 in the UK.
4. "The People That Life Forgot"
5. "L.T.D." (Jon Poole)
6. "Looking for the One"
7. "6.30 Onwards"
8. "Eager to Leave 'Er"
9. "Putting It On" (C.J.)
10. "Better Than Cable"
11. "Lake of Piss" (Ginger, C.J.)
12. "If I Decide"
13. "Bang!"
14. "You Got to Get Through What You've Got to Go Through to Get What You Want, But You Got to Know What You Want to Get Through What You Got to Go Through" (Ginger, C.J., Stidi)
15. "Hit It On the Head" (C.J.)
16. "Let's Go" (Stidi, Ginger)
17. "Return to Zero" (Ginger, Steve Firth)
  - First appearance on CD, from the 7" vinyl single of "So Into You".
18. "O.C.D." (Ginger, C.J., Stidi)
19. "Action Panzer"
20. "Dancin'" (McCormack, Ginger)
  - Originally titled "Danny's Dancin'" when it appeared as the B-side of "So Into You".
21. "Stormy in the North, Karma in the South" (video)
- 1-2, 12-14 from the Stormy in the North, Karma in the South single.
- 6, 9-10, 16, 18 from the Vanilla Radio single.
- 4, 11, 17, 19-20 from the So Into You single.
- 3, 5, 7-8, 15 from the Top of the World single.
