= Renaissance Men =

Studio album by the Wildhearts
- Released: 3 May 2019
- Studios: Treehouse Studio (Chesterfield, Derbyshire)
- Genres: Hard rock; heavy metal; punk rock; power pop
- Length: 38:35
- Label: Graphite
- Producer: Jim Pinder

The Wildhearts chronology
Live in the Studio Remastered (2019)	Renaissance Men (2019)	Diagnosis (2019)

Singles from Renaissance Men
- 1. "Dislocated" Released: 15 February 2019

Renaissance Men is the ninth studio album by British rock band The Wildhearts. Recorded at Treehouse Studio in Chesterfield, Derbyshire, it was produced by Jim Pinder and released on 3 May 2019 by Graphite Records, as the group's first studio album in ten years. The album was the band's first release since P.H.U.Q. in 1995 to reach the top twenty of the UK Albums Chart, peaking at number 11. Opening song "Dislocated" was released as the only single from the album.

After a ten-year break from recording, the Wildhearts released Renaissance Men as their first studio album since ¡Chutzpah! in 2009. The album received positive reviews from critics, who likened it to the band's 1993 debut Earth vs the Wildhearts and 1995 album P.H.U.Q. Following its release, the band released the EP Diagnosis, which featured the song of the same name alongside five new tracks. Both were promoted on a tour which spawned 2020's 30 Year Itch album.

== Background ==
The Wildhearts began working on material for a ninth studio album in 2018. They officially announced Renaissance Men, their first studio collection since ¡Chutzpah! ten years earlier, in January 2019 alongside a short promotional UK tour to coincide with its release. The album was the first to feature the lineup of Ginger Wildheart, CJ Wildheart, Danny McCormack and Ritch Battersby since 1994's Fishing for Luckies (CJ left partway through sessions for the 1995 follow-up, P.H.U.Q.). The band released "Dislocated" as the lead single from the album on 15 February 2019, which Ginger explained was "a song about mental health issues". In a track-by-track album guide for Classic Rock magazine, he elaborated about the song's meaning: "'Dislocated' is about how bullying has turned into a more vicious sport since the advent of social media. [...] The song was written about a girl I knew who was really affected by some stuff that was being said about her on Facebook, and it got to the point where she was so fed up with it all she was threatening to commit suicide. I stayed up with her all night to talk her down from the from the ledge, so to speak."

== Reception ==
=== Commercial ===
Renaissance Men was the Wildhearts' first album since 1995's P.H.U.Q. to reach the UK Albums Chart top 20, debuting at number 11. It reached number 4 on the Scottish Albums Chart, the highest position achieved by the band thus far. The album also registered at number 2 on the UK Independent Albums and UK Rock & Metal Albums Charts; number 3 on the UK Vinyl Albums Chart; number 4 on the UK Albums Sales and UK Physical Albums Charts; and number 6 on the UK Album Downloads Chart.

=== Critical ===
Professional ratings
Review scores
Source	Rating
Brave Words & Bloody Knuckles	7.5/10
Classic Rock	4.5/5 stars
Kerrang!	4/5
Los Angeles Weekly	favourable
Louder Than War	9.5/10

Critical reception to Renaissance Men was widely positive. Writing for Classic Rock, Neil Jeffries gave the album 4.5 out of five stars, hailing it as the band's best album since 1995's P.H.U.Q. Jeffries praised the record for being "darker and heavier" than 2009's ¡Chutzpah!, highlighting "Diagnosis" as the best song on the release. Neil Johnson of Louder Than War rated Renaissance Men as 9.5 out of a possible ten, also describing the album as "darker" than previous releases, praising the production of the tracks, and concluding that "Frankly, there isn't a bad song here". Los Angeles Weekly columnist Brett Callwood gave the album a favourable review in the publication's "Album of the Week" feature, agreeing with other reviewers' claim that it is the band's best effort since P.H.U.Q. and writing that "Anyone waiting for a bad Wildhearts album can just keep waiting. This band doesn't do 'em." Kerrang! magazine awarded Renaissance Men a four out of five rating.

At the end of 2019, Classic Rock selected Renaissance Men as the best album of the year. The magazine's editor Siân Llewellyn hailed the release as "An absolute belter from start to finish" and "all killer and no filler", describing it as "triumphant, galvanising, thrumming with melody and energy and attitude and intent". Metal Hammer included the record at number 19 in its list of the top metal albums of 2019, describing it as "without question, the coolest, loudest and snottiest rock album of 2019" and claiming it as the band's best album since debut Earth vs the Wildhearts. Kerrang! did not include the album in its main end-of-year rankings, although writer Steve Beebee ranked it as the best release of 2019, calling it "Not merely a brilliant comeback, but the year's most vital and on-the-money soundtrack".

== Track listing ==
All tracks are written by Ginger Wildheart, except track 7 by CJ Wildheart.

No.	Title	Length
1.	"Dislocated"	5:51
2.	"Let 'Em Go"	4:12
3.	"The Renaissance Men"	2:49
4.	"Fine Art of Deception"	2:56
5.	"Diagnosis"	5:51
6.	"My Kinda Movie"	3:24
7.	"Little Flower"	3:07
8.	"Emergency (Fentanyl Babylon)"	2:24
9.	"My Side of the Bed"	4:17
10.	"Pilo Erection"	3:39
Total length:		38:35

Japanese edition bonus tracks
No.	Title	Length
11.	"Let 'Em Go" (demo version)	4:31
12.	"Pilo Erection" (demo version)	3:39
Total length:		46:45

== Personnel ==
The Wildhearts
- Ginger Wildheart – lead vocals, guitar
- CJ Wildheart – guitar, backing vocals
- Danny McCormack – bass, backing vocals
- Ritch Battersby – drums, backing vocals

Additional musicians

- Frank Turner – additional vocals on "Let 'Em Go"
- Ross Bannister – keyboards, piano, backing vocals
- Jez Dennis – percussion, backing vocals
- Rosie O'Hara – backing vocals
- Alex Kissack – backing vocals
- Lewis Wild – backing vocals
- Chris Brayshaw – backing vocals
- Jenn Aspinall – backing vocals
- Carly Todd – backing vocals
- Rachel Dickson – backing vocals
- Georgie Butterworth – backing vocals
- Lucy Patrick – backing vocals
- Donna Oates Revill – backing vocals
- Stacey Gaunt – backing vocals
- Hannah Mae Fellows – backing vocals
- Daisy Pinder – backing vocals
- Charlotte Pinder – backing vocals

Additional personnel

- Jim Pinder – production, engineering, mixing
- Dan Jeffery – additional engineering, backing vocals
- Carl Bown – mixing
- Dave Draper – mastering
- Eliran Kantor – cover artwork
- Tony Woolliscroft – photography

== Charts ==
Chart performance for Renaissance Men
Chart (2019)	Peak position
Scottish Albums (OCC)	4
UK Albums (OCC)	11
UK Album Downloads (OCC)	6
UK Album Sales (OCC)	4
UK Independent Albums (OCC)	2
UK Physical Albums (OCC)	4
UK Rock & Metal Albums (OCC)	2
UK Vinyl Albums (OCC)	3
