= Riff After Riff After Motherfucking Riff =

- Japanese version

Compilation album by The Wildhearts
- Released: November 2002
- Genre: Hard rock, punk rock, heavy metal
- Label: Universal

The Wildhearts chronology
'Tokyo Suits Me' (1999)	Riff After Riff After Motherfucking Riff (2002)	'The Wildhearts Must Be Destroyed' (2003)

Riff After Riff
- U.S. Version

Professional ratings
Review scores
Source	Rating
Allmusic	4/5 stars

Riff After Riff After Motherfucking Riff is a 2002 compilation of the B-sides from various versions of The Wildhearts' 2002 single "Vanilla Radio" plus the song "Stormy in the North, Karma in the South". ("Vanilla Radio" would later appear on the 2003 studio album The Wildhearts Must Be Destroyed.) An expanded version of the compilation called Riff After Riff was released in the US the following year, featuring several more tracks recorded by the band in 2001 and 2002. These additional songs were generally used as B-sides for the other singles from The Wildhearts Must Be Destroyed. All of the songs from both versions of this compilation except for "Vanilla Radio" are also found on the 2004 compilation Coupled With.

== Japanese Track listing ==
Riff After Riff After Motherfucking Riff

1. "Stormy in the North, Karma in the South"
2. "Putting it On"
3. "Looking for the One"
4. "Vanilla Radio"
5. "O.C.D"
6. "Better Than Cable"
7. "Let's Go"

== US Track listing ==
Riff After Riff

1. "Stormy in the North, Karma in the South"
2. "Putting it On"
3. "Looking for the One"
4. "Lake of Piss"
5. "Better Than Cable"
6. "If I Decide"
7. "Bang!"
8. "Action Panzer"
9. "The People That Life Forgot"
10. "Move On"
11. "O.C.D"
12. "Return to Zero"
13. "Let's Go"
