= Mondo Akimbo a-Go-Go =

EP by the Wildhearts
- Released: 20 April 1992
- Recorded: December 1991
- Studio: Parkgate (Catsfield, England)
- Genre: Hard rock; heavy metal
- Length: 19:33
- Label: East West; Bronze
- Producer: The Wildhearts; Dan Priest

The Wildhearts chronology
| Mondo Akimbo a-Go-Go (1992) | Don't Be Happy... Just Worry (1992) |

Mondo Akimbo a-Go-Go is the debut extended play (EP) by British rock band the Wildhearts. Recorded in December 1991 at Parkgate Studios in Catsfield, East Sussex, it was produced by the band with Dan Priest and released on 20 April 1992 by East West and Bronze Records. All four tracks were remixed for inclusion on the band's second EP, Don't Be Happy... Just Worry, released later in 1992. A music video was also released for "Nothing Ever Changes But the Shoes".

== Background ==
Shortly after bringing in drummer Bam Ross from the Dogs D'Amour, the Wildhearts recorded their debut EP in December 1991. The sessions took place at Parkgate Studios in Catsfield, East Sussex, with the band self-producing alongside "Desperate" Dan Priest. The EP was released on 20 April 1992 by East West and Bronze Records on two formats: CD and 12" vinyl (black and white variants); both vinyl releases also featured an excerpt of a song called "Truth" as an unlisted track at the end of "Liberty Cap". The cover artwork is a piece by Peter Mason dubbed Heart Surgery, which depicts a toy arrow through a pig's heart.

Mondo Akimbo a-Go-Go was promoted on the band's first headline tour, a short run of small clubs across the UK dubbed the Welcome to Shitsville Tour 1992 A.D. None of the tracks on the EP were released as singles, although a music video was produced for opening track "Nothing Ever Changes But the Shoes" and sold as a promotional VHS to fans during tour dates prior to the EP's release. The video was directed by John Mills. In response to a question about the meaning of the title Mondo Akimbo a-Go-Go during an "Ask Ginger" feature for the band's official website in February 2000, Ginger explained that "It doesn't mean anything. We got so bored when people would ask this question that we made a literal translation of the title that came out as 'the world dances with its legs apart'. So, er... that'll be what it means, then."

All four tracks on Mondo Akimbo a-Go-Go were later remixed by American producer Terry Date and included on the Wildhearts' second EP Don't Be Happy... Just Worry, which was released in November 1992. The songs were also released as the first disc of the Japanese 4-disc box set Moodswings and Roundabouts in 1998 – the collection included the excerpt of "Truth" featured on the original vinyl release of the EP, marking the first time it was available on CD.

== Reception ==
Professional ratings
Review scores
| Source | Rating |
|---|---|
| AllMusic | 1.5/5 stars |
| Kerrang! | 3/5 |

Mondo Akimbo a-Go-Go received mixed reviews from critics. Kerrang! writer Neil Jeffries awarded the EP a rating of three out of five Ks, primarily focusing on the mixing of the release as its main downfall. In a retrospective review for the website AllMusic, Eduardo Rivadavia gave the EP just one and a half out of five stars, describing it as "a modest first step for a band bound for ... rock & roll legend". Rivadavia highlighted "Nothing Ever Changes But the Shoes" as "the only semi-worthy entry" to the band's catalogue, as well as noting that "songs like "Crying Over Nothing" and "Liberty Cap" already show traces of [Ginger Wildheart's] uncanny ability for juggling any number of different hard rock/heavy metal styles into surprising combinations".

== Track listing ==
All tracks are written by Ginger Wildheart

| No. | Title | Length |
|---|---|---|
| 1. | "Nothing Ever Changes But the Shoes" | 5:24 |
| 2. | "Crying Over Nothing" | 3:47 |
| 3. | "Turning American" | 6:10 |
| 4. | "Liberty Cap" | 4:12 |
| Total length: | | 19:33 |

12" vinyl version
| No. | Title | Length |
|---|---|---|
| 5. | "Truth" (excerpt) | 0:39 |
| Total length: | | 20:12 |

== Personnel ==
The Wildhearts

- Ginger – vocals, guitar
- C.J. – guitar, vocals
- Danny – bass, vocals
- Bam – drums

Additional personnel

- Dan Priest – production, engineering
- Doug Cook – engineering
- Peter Mason – artwork
