= Don't Be Happy... Just Worry =

EP by the Wildhearts
- Released: 23 November 1992
- Recorded: 1992
- Studio: Rockfield (Rockfield, Wales)
- Genre: Hard rock; heavy metal; pop rock
- Length: 36:54
- Label: East West; Bronze
- Producer: The Wildhearts; Dan Priest; Robert Musso

The Wildhearts chronology
Mondo Akimbo a-Go-Go (1992)	Don't Be Happy... Just Worry (1992)	Earth vs. the Wildhearts (1993)

Don't Be Happy... Just Worry is the second extended play (EP) by British rock band the Wildhearts. It was released on 23 November 1992 by East West and Bronze Records, it consists of remixed versions of all four tracks from the band's first EP Mondo Akimbo a-Go-Go alongside four new tracks recorded at Rockfield Studios in Rockfield, Wales with producer Robert Musso. The EP was the band's first release to chart, reaching number 91 on the UK Albums Chart.

== Background ==
After touring in promotion of their debut EP Mondo Akimbo a-Go-Go, the Wildhearts recorded four new tracks at Rockfield Studios in Rockfield, Monmouthshire, Wales in the summer of 1992. For the sessions, the band worked with American producer Robert Musso and mixing engineer Terry Date. In addition to the new songs, Don't Be Happy... Just Worry also features all four tracks from Mondo Akimbo a-Go-Go, newly remixed by Date and dubbed the "Anti-Dance Mixes". The EP was released on 23 November 1992 by East West and Bronze Records, on double CD and double 12" vinyl. A single-disc mini album version was issued on 25 April 1994.

== Reception ==
=== Commercial ===
Don't Be Happy... Just Worry was the Wildhearts' first release to chart, registering at number 91 on the UK Albums Chart.

=== Critical ===
Professional ratings
Review scores
Source	Rating
AllMusic	2.5/5 stars
Music Week	3/5

Don't Be Happy... Just Worry received mixed reviews from critics. In a brief feature for Music Week around the time of its initial release, Andy Martin gave the EP a rating of two out of five. Martin later reviewed the EP for Music Week upon its 1994 reissue, this time awarding it three out of five and hailing it as being "brimful of topping pop rock songs". In a retrospective review for the website AllMusic, Eduardo Rivadavia gave the EP two and a half out of five stars, describing it as a "much-improved second effort" by the band. Rivadavia praised the release for "prov[ing] just how far the Wildhearts had come in those six months", highlighting "Splattermania", "Dreaming in A" and "Something Weird (Going on in My Head)". Music & Media praised "Turning American" and "Crying Over Nothing" as "the right pacemakers for rock radio".

== Track listing ==
All tracks are written by Ginger Wildheart.

Mondo Akimbo a-Go-Go (Anti-Dance Mix)
No.	Title	Length
1.	"Turning American"	6:21
2.	"Crying Over Nothing"	3:48
3.	"Nothing Ever Changes But the Shoes"	5:38
4.	"Liberty Cap"	4:16

Don't Be Happy... Just Worry
No.	Title	Length
5.	"Splattermania"	4:06
6.	"Something Weird (Going on in My Head)"	4:50
7.	"Weekend (Five Long Days)"	4:26
8.	"Dreaming in A"	3:29
Total length:		36:54

== Personnel ==
The Wildhearts

- Ginger Wildheart – lead vocals, guitar, production
- CJ Wildheart – guitar, backing vocals, production
- Danny McCormack – bass, production
- Bam Ross – drums, production

Additional personnel

- Dan Priest – production and engineering on tracks 1–4
- Doug Cook – engineering on tracks 1–4
- Robert Musso – production on tracks 5–8
- Paul Cobbold – engineering on tracks 5–8
- Terry Date – mixing on tracks 5–8, remix on tracks 1–4

== Charts ==
Chart performance for Don't Be Happy... Just Worry
Chart (1992)	Peak position
UK Albums (OCC)	91
