= Danny McCormack =

English musician (b.1972)

- Born: 28 February 1972 (age 54); South Shields, Tyne & Wear, England
- Origin: Newcastle upon Tyne, Tyne & Wear, England
- Instrument: Bass guitar
- Years active: 1991–present

Danny McCormack (born 28 February 1972) is an English rock musician, best known for several tenures as the bassist and backing vocalist for The Wildhearts.

== Biography ==
McCormack became the bass player for The Wildhearts at age 19 in 1991, enjoying success during their commercial peak, until the band split in 1997. McCormack went on to form The Yo-Yos with Tom Spencer (formerly of The Lurkers), and the band released an album on Sub Pop Records before splitting in 2000.

He re-joined The Wildhearts when they reformed in 2001, but only played with the band sporadically due to drug abuse, and left again in 2003. At the time the group's frontman Ginger Wildheart penned an open letter to Kerrang! magazine documenting McCormack's drug problems and wished him a complete recovery. McCormack briefly played with Dogs D'Amour before re-forming The Yo-Yos in 2005. That band released the EP Given Up Giving Up. He subsequently supported his younger brother Chris McCormack's band, 3 Colours Red, on tours of Germany and the UK, but that band fired him following further drug problems.

After a prolonged absence from the music scene for a number of years, McCormack returned to live guest performances with various bands in 2012. In 2015 he formed a new band called The Main Grains, which released an EP called Don't Believe Everything You Think. Later that year, McCormack nearly died after suffering an aneurysm, which later culminated in the amputation of his lower leg.

After many years of a contentious relationship, McCormack and Ginger Wildheart reconciled in 2018 and reformed the mid-1990s lineup of The Wildhearts. The band released new albums in 2019 and 2021. The band again split acrimoniously in 2022, with Ginger continuing with yet another lineup. The following year, McCormack released his autobiography I Danny McCormack, Once a Wildheart, Always a Wildheart. Written with journalist Guy Shankland, the book was self-published and printed by B&B Press. The book's release was delayed due to the threat of legal action from one of McCormack's former bandmates.

== UK albums ==
- Earth Vs The Wildhearts – The Wildhearts (East West 1993)
- P.H.U.Q. – The Wildhearts (East West 1995)
- Fishing For Luckies – The Wildhearts (Round 1996)
- Endless Nameless – The Wildhearts (Mushroom 1997)
- Uppers and Downers – The Yo-Yos (Sub Pop 2000)
- Don't Believe Everything You Think – The Main Grains (TSP Records 2000)
- Renaissance Men – The Wildhearts (Graphite 2019)
- 21st Century Love Songs – The Wildhearts (Graphite 2021)

=== UK Mini-albums & EPs ===
- Mondo Akimbo A Go Go – The Wildhearts (East West 1991)
- Don't Be Happy... Just Worry – The Wildhearts (East West 1992)
- Red Light – Green Light EP – The Wildhearts (Round 1996)
- Onwards & Upwards – The Chasers (ChangesOne 2001)
- Giving Up, Giving Up Again – The Yo-Yos (not formally released 2006)
- "Don't Believe Everything You Think" – The Main Grains (TSB 2015)

=== UK Compilations ===
- The Best of The Wildhearts – The Wildhearts (East West 1996)
- Landmines and Pantomimes – The Wildhearts (Kuro Neko 1998)
- Coupled With – The Wildhearts (Gut Records 2004)
- The Works – The Wildhearts (Rhino Records 2008)

=== Live albums ===
- Anarchic Airwaves – The Wildhearts (Kuro Neko 1999)
- Geordie in Wonderland – The Wildhearts (Snapper 2006)

=== International releases ===
- Tokyo Suits Me (Japan only release) – The Wildhearts (Mercury 1999)
- Riff After Riff After Motherfucking Riff (Japan only release) – The Wildhearts (Universal 2002)

=== Solo Career ===
- I Don't Want To Be Nobody Else EP (Struck Dum Records 2025)

=== DVDs ===
- Live at the Castle – The Wildhearts (Secret 2005)
