= So into You (The Wildhearts song) =

"So Into You"

Single by The Wildhearts

from the album The Wildhearts Must Be Destroyed
- Released: May 2003
- Genre: Rock
- Label: Gut Records
- Songwriter(s): CJ Wildheart, Ginger

The Wildhearts singles chronology
"Stormy in the North, Karma in the South" (2003)	"So Into You" (2003)	"Top of the World" (2003)

CD 1 Cover

CD 2 Cover

"So Into You" is the second single from the album The Wildhearts Must Be Destroyed by The Wildhearts. It peaked at #22 on the UK Singles Chart.

== Track listing ==
CD1:

1. So Into You (Gordon Raphael mix)
2. Dancin'
3. Lake Of Piss

CD2:

1. So Into You (Spike Drake mix)
2. Action Panzer
3. The People That Life Forgot

7" Red Vinyl:

1. So Into You (Spike Drake mix)
2. Dancin' (instrumental version)
3. Return To Zero
