= The Wildhearts Must Be Destroyed =

Studio album by the Wildhearts
- Released: 25 August 2003
- Genre: Hard rock; punk rock; heavy metal
- Length: 32:43
- Label: Gut
- Producer: Ginger; Russ Russell

The Wildhearts chronology
Riff After Riff After Motherfucking Riff (2002)	The Wildhearts Must Be Destroyed (2003)	Coupled With (2004)

Professional ratings
Review scores
Source	Rating
AllMusic	2.5/5 stars
Spin	A

The Wildhearts Must Be Destroyed is a 2003 album by the Wildhearts. The album's title makes reference to 1969 horror film Frankenstein Must Be Destroyed.

The album was the first new studio release since the Wildhearts broke up in 1997 and reformed in 2001. Rumours indicated that the album would feature the same line-up as the 1993 album Earth vs the Wildhearts, and that line-up did indeed reform in 2001, but bassist Danny McCormack dropped out and entered rehab just prior to the recording of the album. McCormack had appeared on some songs that would be used as B-sides for the album, but on the album itself bass duties were performed by group leader Ginger. Three singles were released in the UK with some chart success: "Vanilla Radio", "So into You" and "Top of the World". The B-sides from various versions of these singles later appeared on the compilations Riff After Riff After Motherfucking Riff and Coupled With.

== Track listing ==
All tracks written by Ginger unless noted otherwise.

No.	Title	Length
1.	"Nexus Icon"	2:39
2.	"Only Love"	2:56
3.	"Someone That Won't Let Me Go"	3:32
4.	"Vanilla Radio"	3:13
5.	"One Love, One Life, One Girl"	2:32
6.	"Get Your Groove on"	1:49
7.	"So into You (Ginger/CJ)"	2:40
8.	"There's Only One Hell"	2:43
9.	"It's All Up To Me"	4:19
10.	"Out From The Inside (CJ)"	2:32
11.	"Top of the World"	3:54

Japanese Bonus Tracks
No.	Title	Length
12.	"Bang!"	5:08
13.	"Move On"	3:54

2010 Re-issue Bonus Disc
No.	Title	Length
1.	"Bang! (Japanese Bonus Track)"	5:08
2.	"Move On (Japanese Bonus Track)"	3:54
3.	"So Into You (Gordon Raphael Mix)"	2:40
4.	"Danny Dancin' (B-Side to "So Into You" Single)"	1:08
5.	"Lake of Piss (B-Side to "So Into You" Single)"	5:34
6.	"So into You (Spike Drake Mix)"	2:40
7.	"Action Panzer (B-Side to "So Into You" Single)"	3:00
8.	"The People That Life Forgot (B-Side to "So Into You" Single)"	3:46
9.	"Return to Zero (B-Side to "So Into You" Single)"	4:06
10.	"6.30 Onward (B-Side to "Top of the World" Single)"	4:26
11.	"Eager to Leave 'Er (B-Side to "Top of the World" Single)"	3:43
12.	"Hit It on the Head (B-Side to "Top of the World" Single)"	3:30
13.	"Cheers (B-Side to "Top of the World" Single) (Porthoy/Angelo/Bob James)"	4:00
14.	"L.T.D. (B-Side to "Top of the World" Single) (Jon Poole)"	3:17

== Personnel ==
- Ginger – vocals, guitar, bass
- CJ – guitar, vocals
- Stidi – drums
- Justin Hawkins – backing vocals on "Only Love" and "Get Your Groove On"
