= The Wildhearts (album) =

Studio album by the Wildhearts
- Released: 23 April 2007
- Genre: Hard rock; punk rock; heavy metal
- Length: 55:35
- Label: Round Records
- Producer: Jase Edwards

The Wildhearts chronology
Geordie in Wonderland (2006)	The Wildhearts (2007)	The Works (2008)

The Wildhearts is the sixth album by the eponymous band. The first (download only) single was "The Sweetest Song" released two weeks before the album. The next single was "The New Flesh", the first on the album to be accompanied with a video. A remaster done by Dave Draper including bonus tracks was released in January 2019.

== Reception ==
The album reached number 55 in the UK album charts the week after its release.

Professional ratings
Review scores
Source	Rating
AllMusic	link

== Track listing ==
No.	Title	Length
1.	"Rooting for the Bad Guy"	8:55
2.	"The Sweetest Song"	4:08
3.	"The Revolution Will Be Televised"	4:34
4.	"The New Flesh"	4:18
5.	"Slaughtered Authors"	8:29
6.	"The Hard Way"	6:17
7.	"Inner City Overture"	3:50
8.	"Bi-Polar Baby"	4:38
9.	"She's All That"	3:57
10.	"Destroy All Monsters"	6:17

2018 remaster bonus tracks
No.	Title	Length
11.	"Borderline"	5:12
12.	"Zeen Requiem"	3:40
13.	"So the Spencers Can Poke Out"	2:11
14.	"Oh Bonita"	3:22
15.	"Unbroken"	5:02
16.	"The New Flesh (Single Version)"	3:29
17.	"Inner City Overture (Single Version)"	3:21

== Charts ==
=== Weekly charts ===
Chart (2007)	Position
UK Albums Chart	55

== Release history ==
Country	Release date	Format	Label	Catalogue
UK	23 April 2007	CD; Vinyl	Round Records	ROUND010
UK	January 2019	CD; Vinyl; Digital download	Round Records	RRRCD007

== Personnel ==
- Ginger – vocals, guitar
- CJ – guitar, vocals
- Ritch Battersby – drums
- Scott Sorry – bass, vocals
