= The Best of the Wildhearts =

Greatest hits album by the Wildhearts
- Released: November 1996
- Genre: Hard rock; punk rock
- Label: East West
- Producer: Ralph Jezzard

The Wildhearts chronology
P.H.U.Q. (1995)	The Best of the Wildhearts (1996)	Endless, Nameless (1997)

Alternative cover
- Japanese Cover

Professional ratings
Review scores
Source	Rating
AllMusic	4.5/5 stars

The Best of the Wildhearts is a compilation album released by the record label East West Records after the Wildhearts split with East West unendorsed by the band. It includes the UK CD debut of Beautiful Me, Beautiful You and 29 x The Pain '96. A more comprehensive release was issued in Japan in 1997.

== UK track listing ==
1. "I Wanna Go Where the People Go"
2. "TV Tan"
3. "Sick of Drugs"
4. "29x the Pain"
5. "Caffeine Bomb"
6. "Geordie in Wonderland"
7. "Suckerpunch"
8. "Just in Lust"
9. "Greetings from Shitsville"
10. "In Lilly's Garden"
11. "My Baby Is a Headfuck"
12. "If Life Is Like a Lovebank I Want an Overdraft"
13. "Nothing Ever Changes But the Shoes"
14. "Red Light Green Light"
15. "Beautiful Me, Beautiful You"
16. "Splattermania"

Time: 62:27 min.

== Japanese track listing ==
CD1

1. "Nothing Ever Changes But the Shoes"
2. "TV Tan"
3. "Greetings from Shitsville"
4. "Dreaming In A"
5. "Suckerpunch"
6. "My Baby Is a Headfuck"
7. "The Miles Away Girl"
8. "Loveshit"
9. "I Wanna Go Where the People Go"
10. "Jonesing for Jones"
11. "Just in Lust"
12. "Baby Strange"
13. "Nita Nitro"
14. "Sick of Drugs"
15. "Red Light-Green Light"

CD2

1. "Do Anything"
2. "Mindslide"
3. "Beautiful Thing You"
4. "Got it on Tuesday"
5. "Friend for 5 Minutes"
6. "29x the Pain (Original Version)"
7. "And the Bullshit Goes On"
8. "Bad Time to Be Having a Bad Time"
9. "Can't Do Right for Doing Wrong"
10. "Two Way Idiot Mirror"
11. "S.I.N (In Sin)"
12. "Give the Girl a Gun"
13. "Girlfriend Clothes"
14. "Sky Chaser High"
15. "Geordie in Wonderland"

== Charts ==
Chart performance for The Best of the Wildhearts
Chart (1996)	Peak position
Japan (Oricon)	48
