= Top of the World (The Wildhearts song) =

"Top Of The World"

Single by The Wildhearts
- Released: November 2003
- Genre: Rock
- Length: 3:52
- Label: Gut Records
- Songwriter(s): David Leslie Walls

The Wildhearts singles chronology
"So into You" (2003)	"Top Of The World" (2003)	"The Sweetest Song" (2007)

"Top of the World" is the third single from the album The Wildhearts Must Be Destroyed by The Wildhearts. It peaked at #26 on the UK Singles Chart.

== Track listings ==
CD1:

1. "Top of the World" (written by Ginger)
2. "6:30 Onwards" (written by Ginger)
3. "Eager To Leave 'Er" (written by Ginger)

CD2:

1. "Top of the World" (written by Ginger)
2. "Hit It on the Head" (written by CJ)
3. "Top of the World" (Video)

CD3:

1. "Top of the World" (written by Ginger)
2. "Cheers" (TV show theme: "Where Everybody Knows Your Name" written by Portnoy/Angelo)
3. "L.T.D" (written by Jon Poole)
