= Dunken Francis Mullett =

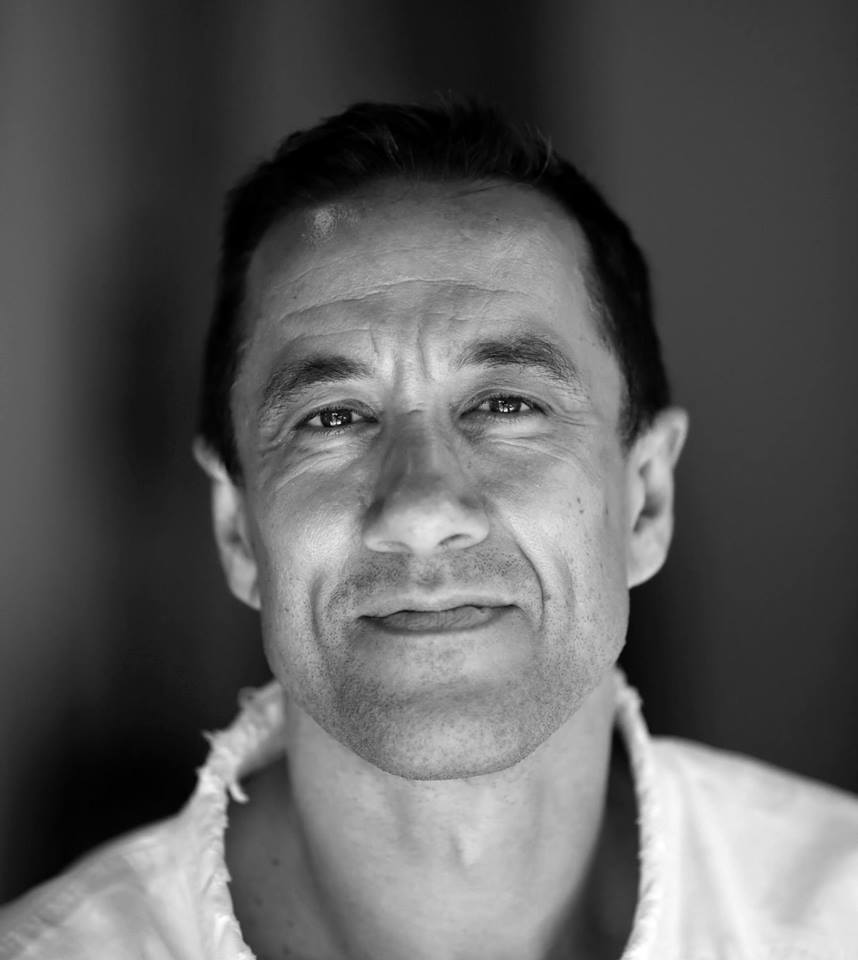
- Dunken Francis Mullett at the Aikido Silverdale Dojo, Auckland

Background information
- Born: 23 April 1964 (age 62); Battersea, London, England
- Occupations: Musician; author; martial artist
- Instruments: Vocals; guitar; harmonica
- Years active: 1982–present
- Member of: Mournblade

Dunken Francis Mullett (born 23 April 1964), recording as Dunken Francis, is an English musician, author and martial artist. He was a founding member of cult British heavy metal band Mournblade (recording 4 albums) and later played and recorded with The Wildhearts, Hipjam and The Ragged Boys.

Mullett currently holds the rank of 6th degree black belt in traditional Aikido and is the senior instructor at The Institute of Aikido Auckland based in Auckland, New Zealand and is also the author of "Aikido – A beginner's guide" and "Aikido – The first steps", both of which are used by many dojos around the world as beginner's texts.

== Early life ==
Mullett was born in Battersea, London. His family moved to West Drayton in 1969 where he began a career in Aikido at the Hut Dojo, birthplace of Aikido in the UK. He went to school at Bishopshalt Grammar School where he developed a passion for writing, art and music.

== Career ==
=== Early music career and Mournblade (1980–89) ===
Mullett left school aged 16 and attended Ealing College of Higher Education (later Thames Valley University) where he undertook a four-year D.A.T.EC Visual Communications qualification. It was here he met Richie Jones; with similar interest in science fiction writing, and bands like Hawkwind, The Pink Fairies and Motörhead, so they began writing music together. Within a few months Mournblade performed their first gig at the Ealing College student union hall. The band's early influences were dominated by the books of Michael Moorcock, at one stage the live show featured Mullet undertaking 14 costume changes and the use of many props.

The band gigged around the UK promoting their first official release, "Times Running Out". Over the period of a few years the band performed over 400 gigs with acts including Motörhead, Doctor and The Medics, Zodiac Mindwarp, Hazel O'Connor and The Enid. Mournblade were great supporters of the free festival circuit, playing at the Stonehenge festival in 1984 and 1985.

In 1985 Jones left the band, which coincided with the decision to leave behind the theatrics and make-up so the music and stage show became more raw and stripped down. Many people now consider this era of the band as belonging to the latter part of the new wave of British heavy metal movement. Now a 4-piece, the band went on to release their second album, "Live Fast Die Young", and toured non-stop in the UK and Europe until the band split late in 1989.

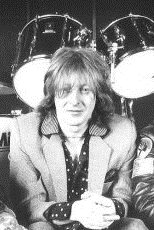
The band with no name

Early in 1990 after the demise of Mournblade, Mullett teamed up with Glen Matlock (Sex Pistols) and Rat Scabies (The Damned) to form a band that went under several names ("The Itch" and "The Hidden Riders of Tomorrow" amongst others), but only ever performed live once.

Mullett then joined a fledgling line-up of The Wildhearts in late 1990, and sang on a five track unreleased demo produced by Ric Browde for East West Records. Mullett left after a year and formed "Hipjam" with guitarist Andy Marlow and his old friend Steve "Smiley" Barnard on drums. They went on to record the eponymously titled album late in 1992.

=== Recent musical career ===
After the demise of Hipjam in 1993, Mullett took a step back from music to concentrate on his martial arts career. During this time he continued to play with covers bands, notably Auckland's "Soul Pit Orchestra", a 60s soul/Motown band; "2's A Crowd", an acoustic duo, and "Henrieta & The Misspent Youth", a jazz trio. In 2012, motivated by fan requests, Mournblade reformed. After a 24-year break, the band played The Heavy Metal Maniacs festival in Hoorn, Holland with only three days rehearsal. The show was captured in the documentary "Mournblade – The Resurrection" directed by Henrieta Tornyai. The band went on to release two further albums "Live & Loud", live recordings from the rehearsals for the reunion show, and "Live in Holland", a double DVD of the documentary and reunion show. The band have announced they are working on new material and plan to do a few shows in UK/Europe in 2014.

In 2016 Francis formed Neo-Rockabilly band Boom! Boom! Deluxe (singing and playing harmonica) with Slovakian-born Kiwi musician Henika (Double bass). In Feb 2018 they released their debut single "Burger and a beer" and in March an eponymously titled 6 track EP, on 10" vinyl via Bear-Family records in Germany. In March 2019 they released their first full length album TeenageJuvenileDelinquentRocknRollHorrorBeachParty! on Austrian label Plan 9 Trash Records to favourable reviews, resulting in TV appearances on TVNZ "Seven Sharp" show and a role as the live band in TV drama "Straight Forward”.

in 2017 Mullett and Tornyai launched The Retrogasmic Podcast, a retro, vintage and kitsch themed podcast interviewing both emerging and established musical artists, retro movies, sci-fi and fashion. Notable guests include Sex Pistols bass player Glen Matlock and Bettie page Biographer Tori Rodrigues. In 2018 Podcast website Feedspot rated it as "the top retro podcast on the internet".

=== Aikido career ===
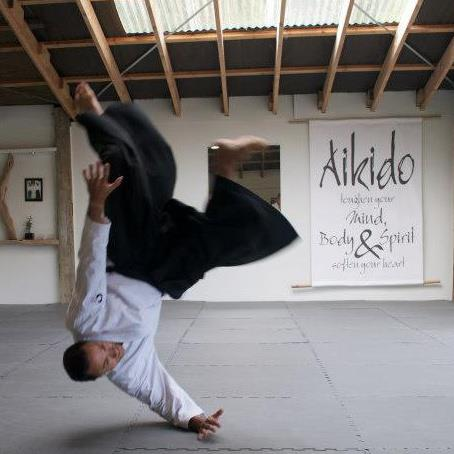
Dunken Francis Mullett Aikido Auckland

Mullett started his Aikido career at the age of 10 in 1974 and was a student of Sensei Haydn W. Foster at the Hut Dojo in London. He was awarded Shodan (1st degree black belt) in 1996, Nidan in 1999, Sandan in 2003, Yodan in 2008, Godan in 2015 and rokudan in 2022. In 2003 Mullett published the book "Aikido – A beginner's guide" and the DVD "Aikido – The first steps", basic guides to Aikido. "Aikido – A beginner's guide" is now in its third edition. He continued training and acting as Senpai (senior student/assistant) to Sensei Foster until he emigrated to New Zealand in 2005. Mullett is the senior instructor at The Institute of Aikido Auckland and The Institute of Aikido Silverdale. In 2008 Mullett built a dedicated Aikido dojo (training hall) on his property in Silverdale, Auckland. With approx 110 sq metres of matted training area this is one of the largest dedicated Aikido dojos in New Zealand and is well known for its 'open door' policy to students from all styles and disciplines. In 2012 Mullett alongside other senior New Zealand Aikido instructors formed the "Institute of Aikido International" Group, which now has affiliated clubs, from a variety of different martial arts in New Zealand, Australia, Greece, Germany and the UK.

== Discography ==
=== Mournblade ===
- The Ealing Tapes (1982)
- Anthem of Chaos (1983)
- Art School Benefit Concert - Live (1983)
- Servants of Fate (1984)
- Stonehenge Festival (1984)
- Live Aid Great Yarmouth (1985)
- Time's Running Out (1985)
- Ein Heldentraum (1986)
- The Titanium Tapes (1986)
- Live at The Wellington (1986)
- Dirty Black Leather, Wet White Lace (1986)
- Live at The Hammersmith Odeon (1987)
- Live Fast, Die Young (1988)
- Live & Loud (2012)
- Live at The Heavy Metal Maniacs (2012)
- Time's Running Out (2015)

=== The Ragged Boys ===
- Rat Tat - who are you? (EP) (1992)

=== HipJam ===
- HipJam (1992)

=== Royal Scam ===
- All Souled Out (1996)

=== Boom! Boom! Deluxe ===
- Boom! Boom! Deluxe (2018)
- TeenageJuvenileDelinquentRocknRollHorrorBeachParty!
