= TV Tan EP =

TV EP

EP by The Wildhearts
- Released: November 1993
- Genre: Hard rock; power pop
- Length: 18:26
- Label: East West
- Producer: The Wildhearts; Mike "Spike" Drake

The Wildhearts chronology
Earth vs the Wildhearts (1993)	TV EP (1993)	Fishing for Luckies (1994)

The Wildhearts singles chronology
"Greetings from Shitsville" (1993)	"TV Tan" (1993)	"Caffeine Bomb" (1994)

Professional ratings
Review scores
Source	Rating
AllMusic	2.5/5 stars

TV Tan EP is a single by The Wildhearts released in 1993. The sticker that came attached to the EP in both its CD and 12" formats contained the words "Contains 3 previously unreleased songs and no artificial additives". The single was also released on a 7" picture disc as 'TV Tan'. It peaked at No. 53 on the UK Singles Chart.

== Music video ==
The accompanying music video for "TV Tan" was directed by Nick Burgess-Jones/Run and produced by William Green for Spidercom. It was released on 8 November 1993 and is a surreal vision featuring a giant animated couch potato.

== Track listing ==
No.	Title	Length
1.	"TV Tan"	4:30
2.	"Show a Little Emotion"	3:02
3.	"Dangerlust"	6:15
4.	"Down On London"	4:39

== Personnel ==
- Ginger – lead vocals, guitar
- C. J. – guitar, backing vocals
- Danny McCormack – bass
- Stidi – drums
