= Landmines and Pantomimes =

Landmines & Pantomimes

Compilation album by The Wildhearts
- Released: March 1998
- Genre: Hard rock, punk rock, heavy metal
- Label: Kuro Neko

The Wildhearts chronology
Anarchic Airwaves (1998)	Landmines & Pantomimes (1998)	Moodswings and Roundabouts (1998)

Landmines & Pantomimes is a compilation by The Wildhearts including unreleased demo tracks and the B-sides to the cancelled 'In Lilly's Garden' single. The album was compiled and released by the record company without authorization from the band. The songs 'Weekend '96' and 'Beautiful Me, Beautiful You' were originally released on the vinyl edition of the 1996 version of Fishing For Luckies, and 'Got it on Tuesday', 'Do Anything' and 'All-American Homeboy Crowd' (without the word 'British') have been officially released as bonus tracks on the Red Light - Green Light EP. Wildhearts leader Ginger has occasionally performed 'Tom Take the Money' live during solo tours. The cover artwork contained elements that had originally been used on The Wildhearts' 1995 album P.H.U.Q. by friend of the band Danny Deen.

== Track listing ==
1. "Abhoria"
2. "Velvet Presley"
3. "Stupid Things"
4. "Tom Take the Money"
5. "State of Nondependance"
6. "Ride the Wave"
7. "Weekend '96"
8. "Beautiful Me, Beautiful You"
9. "Got it on Tuesday"
10. "Do Anything"
11. "The British All-American Home Boy Crowd"
12. "One Before the Lights Go Out"
