= Mournblade (band) =

British heavy metal band

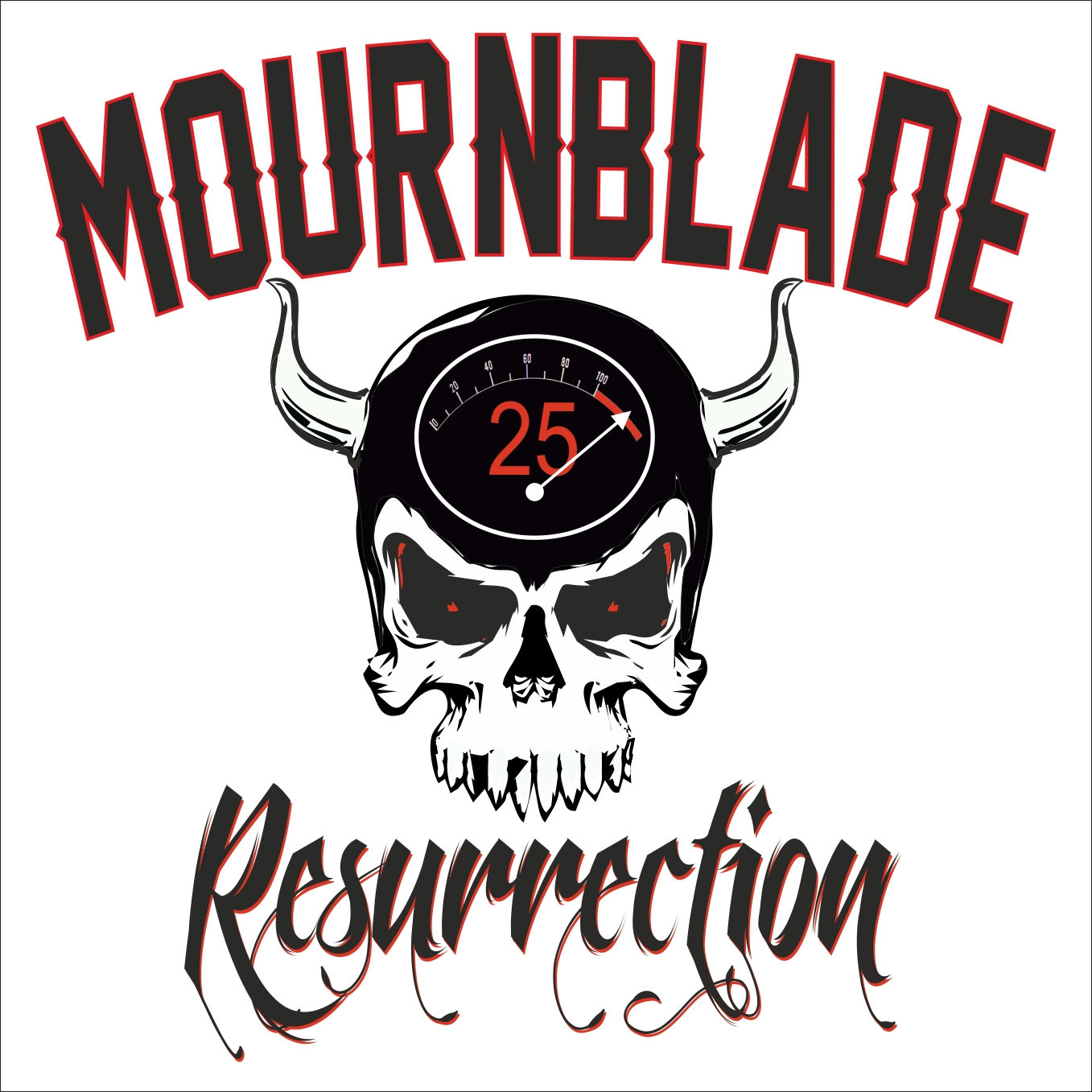
- Logo for Mournblade's reunion show and video, The Resurrection

Background information
- Origin: London, England
- Genres: Heavy metal, speed metal, NWOBHM
- Years active: 1982–1989, 2012–present
- Members: Dunken F Mullett; Stephen Loveday; Garry "Magpie" Bowler; Paul "Blacken" White
- Website: www.mournbladeband.com

Mournblade are a British heavy metal band from London, formed in 1982. The early incarnation falls into the category of space rock. The latter incarnation is regarded as one of the last bands of the new wave of British heavy metal movement. The band is named after a sword from Michael Moorcock's Elric of Melniboné stories.

== Early days, 1982–85 ==
The band was formed in September 1982 by Dunken Francis Mullet and Richie Jones. With similar interest in science fiction writing and the music of bands like Hawkwind, The Pink Fairies and Motörhead, they quickly started writing music together and within a few months Mournblade did their first gig on stage at the Ealing College student union hall with the original line up of Derek Jasnock (keyboards), Richard Jones (guitar), Dunken Mullet (vocals), Nigel Tubb (drums) and Clive Baxter (bass).

The band's early influences included the books of Michael Moorcock, apparent in early material and theatrical live shows (at a book signing Moorcock officially gave Dunken and Richie permission to use the name "Mournblade", a sword from one of his most famous books). At one stage the live show featured Mullet undertaking 14 costume changes as well as many props, notably a 2.5-metre wooden sword, a 1.5-metre high Victorian doll ("Victoria"), a decaying World War I soldiers mask, a devil suit (including a cape with a 3.5-metre wingspan) and a ‘space helmet’ made from a motorcycle crash helmet sprayed gold, covered in LED lights and a small laser.

The band's first official release came after signing with Flicknife Records, "Times Running Out" (SHARP 030, Flicknife Records). The band gigged tirelessly around the UK promoting their album, performing over 400 gigs over the period of a few years. Mournblade were also great supporters of the free festival circuit playing at the Stonehenge Festival in 1984 and 1985 amongst many others. Despite this hard work, Mournblade's initial success, through links to Hawkwind, faded as they failed to impress Hawkwind fans or a general rock audience. They did build up a steady loyal following with fanbases in London (where they regularly headlined the Marquee Club, 100 Club and Dingwalls), South Wales and the Midlands and their hard work caught the attention of Kerrang! magazine, resulting in a full-colour feature and giving rise to the oft-quoted 'Future of Heavy Metal' plaudit.

== 1985–1989 ==
In 1987, Jones left the band (thus ending the 'mk1' era) and this coincided with a decision to leave behind the theatrics and make‑up. The music and stage show became more raw and stripped down and many people now refer to this era of the band as belonging to the latter part of the new wave of British heavy metal movement.

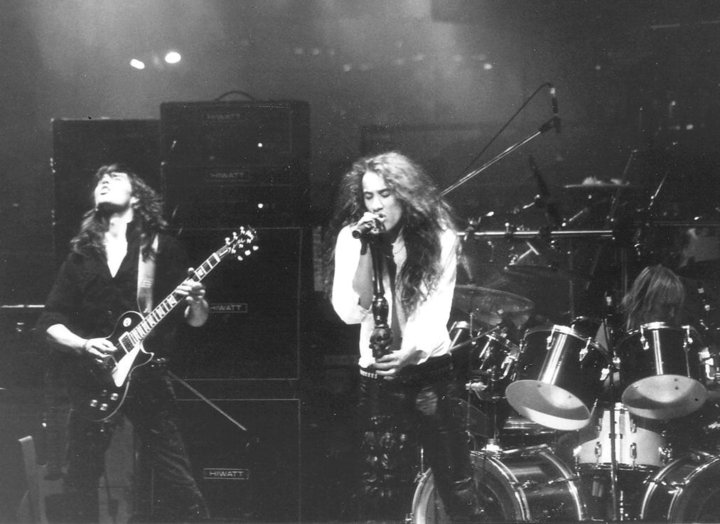
Mournblade, London Hammersmith Odeon 1988

Now a four-piece, the keyboards largely replaced by Paul "Blacken" White's distorted 8‑string Rickenbacker bass sound, the band went on to release their second album, Live Fast Die Young (GILP333 GI Records) and toured non‑stop in the UK and Europe (one UK toured featured 36 shows in 43 days, with the band all living and travelling in the same bus for the entire time), headlining at the London Hippodrome ( a show that was filmed and broadcast by MTV), Marquee Club, and touring around Europe. This gruelling touring schedule contributed to the band's split late in 1989. Mournblade played shows with many major artists during this period including Motörhead to Doctor and The Medics, Zodiac Mindwarp, Hazel O'Connor and The Enid.

== 2012 (The Resurrection) ==
In 2012, motivated by fan requests, Mournblade reformed. With only three days rehearsal (mainly due to the fact that in 2005 singer and founder member Mullett emigrated to New Zealand) after a 24-year break, the band played The Heavy Metal Maniacs Festival in Hoorn, the Netherlands, a show captured in the documentary Mournblade – The Resurrection directed by Henrieta Tornyai. The band went on to release two further albums Live & Loud (live recordings from the rehearsals for the reunion show) and Live in Holland, a double DVD of the documentary and reunion show.

== 2015 (Time's Running Out 2015) ==
Following the release of Anthology Part 1 in 2011, the original 'mk1' line-up decided to re-visit the 1985 Times Running Out album. During 2013–2014, various recording sessions took place during which time the original six tracks were completely re-visited and augmented by three songs from Ein Heldentraum, also re-recorded, to comprise a completely new album. The original 'concept' nature of the band's live shows at this time was hinted at by the use of new linking pieces making the new album stand up as a whole project. Time's Running Out 2015 was released on CD by Non Nobis Productions in September 2015, and subsequently on vinyl (including a short run on translucent media) in June 2016.

== Members ==
=== Current members ===
- Dunken F Mullett – vocals, harmonica (1982 to present)
- Stephen Loveday – Guitar (1985 to present)
- Garry "Magpie" Bowler – Drums (1985 to present)
- Paul "Blacken" White – bass/vocals (1985 to present)

=== Past members ===
- Richie Jones – Guitar (1982–87)
- Aladdin Waz Jarrah – Drums (1982)
- Tim Boyd – Drums (1982)
- Nigel Tubb – Drums (1983–84)
- Jeffrey Leon Ward – Drums (1984–85)
- Chris Jones – Drums (1985)
- Clive Baxter – Bass (1983–84)
- Richard Max Goddard – Bass (1984)
- Steve Ellis – Synthesizer (1983)
- Derek Jasnoch – Keyboards (1984–86)
- Peter Lazonby – Keyboards (1986–87)

== Discography ==
- Time's Running Out (SHARP 030 Flicknife Records) 1985 mini LP
- Live Fast Die Young (GILP333 GI Records) 1989 LP
- Anthology Volume 1 (Angel Air Records) 2011 CD live/demo compilation
- Live & Loud 2012 Live LP
- "Selling Your Ass (for the Big Time)" 2012 Single
- Time's Running Out 2015 (NNP015CD, Non Nobis Production)

== Video ==
- Dirty White Leather, West White Lace – live at Genetic Studios 1985
- Mournblade – The Resurrection documentary (directed by Henrieta Tornyai) 2012
