= Endless, Nameless (album) =

Studio album by The Wildhearts
- Released: 27 October 1997
- Genre: Hard rock, noise rock, industrial rock
- Length: 46:26
- Label: Mushroom Records
- Producer: Ralph Jezzard

The Wildhearts chronology
The Best of The Wildhearts (1996)	Endless, Nameless (1997)	Anarchic Airwaves (1998)

Endless, Nameless is the third studio album by English rock band The Wildhearts, released in 1997. It was the band's first release on Mushroom Records and their only full album with guitarist Jef Streatfield. The songs "Urge" and "Anthem" were released as singles. The album reached no. 41 on the British album chart.

== Background ==
The album shares its title with the Nirvana song "Endless, Nameless", though Wildhearts songwriter Ginger claims this is a coincidence and he was not previously aware of the song. However, some music journalists doubt this claim because of the band's well-known struggles with drugs during that period, while the album shares its noisy and unstructured nature with the Nirvana song. Recording was marred by heavy drug use among all the band's members, with bassist Danny McCormack often absent from the sessions, though he performed his first-ever lead vocal on "Anthem".

The album was influenced by the popular noise rock and industrial rock of the period, which Ginger attempted to combine with the band's previous pop and hard rock sounds with the assistance of new producer Ralph Jezzard, with the result of rock-oriented songwriting often buried by unexpectedly distorted and noisy production. The album's sound has divided the band's fan base.

"Heroin" is a cover of "Heroine" by Dogs D'Amour. The Japanese version of the album featured a cover of the Elvis Costello song "Pump It Up". The album was reissued in 2010 with several songs that had originally served as B-sides for the "Urge" and "Anthem" singles.

== Reception ==
Professional ratings
Review scores
Source	Rating
AllMusic	4/5 stars
Drowned in Sound	10/10
The Encyclopedia of Popular Music	3/5 stars
Kerrang!	4/5 stars
NME	5/10

During a 2018 interview with Kerrang!, Ginger declared that Endless, Nameless is his favorite Wildhearts album, explaining: "I love Endless, Nameless most because it was a statement of pure intent. We wanted to make something challenging that didn’t pander to commercialism, and we did it. Most people think it’s just noise, but I’m very proud of that noise we made." The album was dismissed by many fans and reviewers upon its release, but some retrospective reviews have praised it as a forceful musical statement.

== Track listing ==
All songs written by Ginger except "Heroin" which is originally by Dogs D'Amour (as "Heroine").

No.	Title	Length
1.	"Junkenstein"	2:00
2.	"Nurse Maximum"	4:24
3.	"Anthem"	3:20
4.	"Urge"	4:54
5.	"Pissjoy"	5:07
6.	"Soundog Babylon"	5:09
7.	"Now is the Colour"	4:22
8.	"Heroin"	5:22
9.	"Why You Lie"	4:34
10.	"Thunderfuck"	7:20

== Personnel ==
- Ginger - vocals, guitar, bass
- Jef Streatfield - guitar, bass
- Ritch Battersby - drums
- Danny McCormack - bass, lead vocals on "Anthem"
