= Stormy in the North, Karma in the South =

Single by The Wildhearts
- Released: January 2003
- Genre: Rock
- Label: Snapper Music
- Songwriter(s): CJ Wildheart, Ginger, Ritch Battersby, Daniel S McCormack

The Wildhearts singles chronology
"Vanilla Radio" (2002)	"Stormy in the North, Karma in the South" (2003)	"So Into You" (2003)

"Stormy in the North, Karma in the South" is a single released by the Wildhearts.

== Track listing ==
Disc 1:

1. "Stormy in the North, Karma in the South"
2. "Bang!"
3. "If I Decide"

Disc 2:

1. "Stormy in the North, Karma in the South"
2. "You Got to Get Through What You've Got to Go Through to Get What You Want, but You Got to Know What You Want to Get Through What You Got to Go Through"
3. "Move On"

A DVD was also released detailing how the video was made, but the video itself was not featured on the DVD.

== Charts ==
Chart (2003)	Peak position
UK Rock & Metal (OCC)	1
