= I Wanna Go Where the People Go =

Single by the Wildhearts
- Released: April 1995
- Genre: Rock
- Label: East West
- Songwriter(s): David Leslie Walls

The Wildhearts singles chronology
"'If Life Is Like a Lovebank I Want an Overdraft / Geordie in Wonderland'" (1995)	"I Wanna Go Where the People Go" (1995)	"'Just in Lust'" (1995)

"I Wanna Go Where the People Go" is a 1995 single by the Wildhearts. The limited edition 'Passport Pack' release for this single features different artwork to the other three formats – a leather-effect, three-panel digipak with a mock passport design, using the band's Smileybones logo as the centrepiece. The song peaked at No. 16 on the UK singles chart. It was named Single of the Week by Music Week magazine.

== Track listing ==
1. "I Wanna Go Where The People Go"
2. "Shandy Bang"
3. "Can't Do Right For Doing Wrong"
4. "Give The Girl A Gun"

== Music video ==
A music video for the song was shot during the Wildhearts' stint in New York City. It features the band (at the time just a three-piece following CJ's departure from the band) riding through New York on the back of a flat bed truck interspersed with shots of the band playing in a room dressed in Victorian costume. Ginger can be seen playing a guitar in the shape of the band's Smileybones logo in the New York shots.
