= The Wildhearts =

English rock group

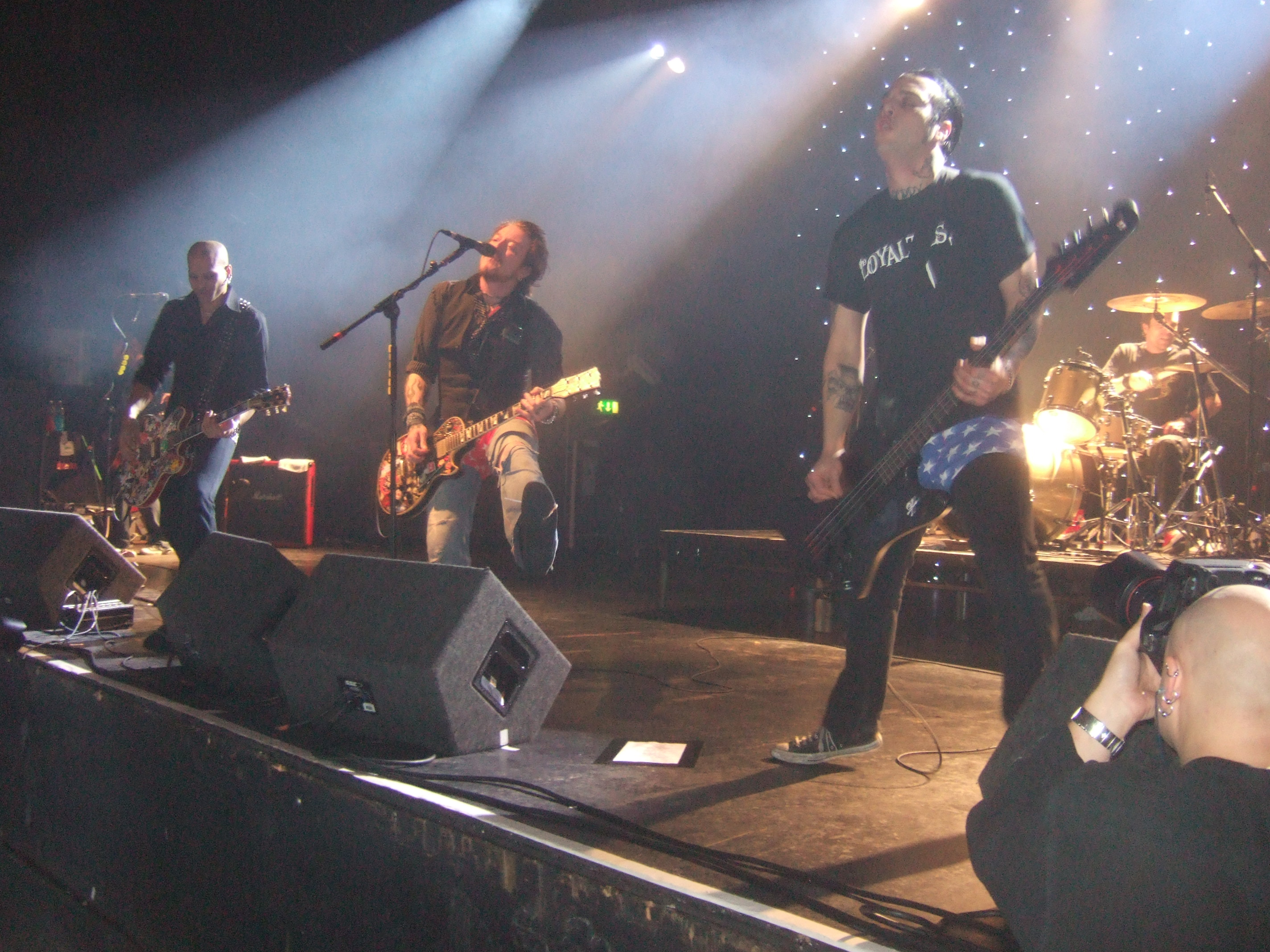
- The Wildhearts performing in 2007

Background information
- Origin: Newcastle, England
- Genres: Hard rock; pop; punk rock; heavy metal
- Years active: 1989–1997; 2001–2009; 2012–2022; 2024–present
- Labels: East West; Bronze; Mushroom; Kuro Neko; BMG; Mercury; Snapper; Universal; Gearhead; Gut; Secret; Round; Rhino; Backstage Alliance; Graphite; Snakefarm
- Members: Ginger; Jon Poole; Ben Marsden; Charles Evans; Carol Hodge
- Past members: CJ; Julien "Joolz" Dean; Stuart "Snake" Neale; Andrew "Stidi" Stidolph; Pat "Panache" Walters; Dunken Francis Mullett; Danny McCormack; Bam Ross; Devin Townsend; Ritch Battersby; Mark Keds; Jef Streatfield; Scott Sorry
- Website: thewildhearts.com

The Wildhearts are an English rock band, formed in 1989 in Newcastle upon Tyne. The band's sound is a mixture of hard rock and melodic pop music, often described in the music press as combining influences as diverse as the Beatles and 1980s-era Metallica. The Wildhearts achieved several top 20 singles and two top 10 albums in Britain, though they also faced difficulties with record companies and many internal problems often relating to drugs and depression. Much of the band's early career was affected by bitter feuds with their record company, East West.

Throughout the band's history, members have regularly been replaced, with the only constant member being the band's founder, singer and guitarist Ginger. Several band members have appeared in the line-up more than once. The band has also been split up or placed on hiatus by Ginger multiple times. In the 2010s, the band convened occasionally for various anniversary tours. A 2018 anniversary tour by the band's 1995 lineup led to a return to the studio. They released a new album in 2019 after a ten-year hiatus. Their most recent album, Satanic Rites of the Wildhearts, was released in March 2025.

== History ==
=== 1989–1991: Early history ===
The Wildhearts formed in late 1989, after Ginger was fired from the Quireboys. Throughout the band's career, Ginger has written almost all the songs himself. Initially called the Wild Hearts, the band originally included singers Snake (ex-Tobruk) and Dunken F. Mullett (ex-Mournblade), who both joined for short periods. After many early personnel changes, the line-up solidified around Ginger on guitar and vocals, CJ (Christopher Jagdhar) on guitar and vocals, Danny McCormack on bass and vocals, and Dogs D'Amour drummer Bam.

=== 1991–1997: Initial success ===
The Ginger/CJ/McCormack/Bam line-up released two EPs in 1992, Mondo Akimbo a-Go-Go and Don't Be Happy... Just Worry, after which drummer Bam returned to Dogs D'Amour and was replaced by Stidi (Andrew Stidolph). To follow up their first two EPs, the Wildhearts recorded demos for their first full-length album, which were released as Earth vs the Wildhearts without re-recording. The singles "Greetings From Shitsville" and "TV Tan" were underground hits in 1993. Stidi left the band shortly afterwards to be replaced by Ritch Battersby, just in time for the recording of the single "Caffeine Bomb", a UK chart hit at the beginning of 1994, helped by a memorable video in which Ginger appeared to vomit into CJ's face. The band appeared on Top of the Pops with Ginger wearing green welding goggles.

The Wildhearts next planned a double album, but East West vetoed this plan during the recording sessions. The band stockpiled existing tracks and continued writing and recording for a proposed single album. Midway through the recording sessions, Ginger fired guitarist CJ, and some of the album's tracks were recorded without a second guitarist. For the 1994 European tours, the band were joined by Devin Townsend as second guitarist/harmony singer, having met him during a previous tour supporting the Steve Vai band. Earth vs. The Wildhearts was reissued in late 1994 with "Caffeine Bomb" tacked on as an extra track.

In December 1994, the Wildhearts issued six of the more eclectic tracks from the incomplete double album sessions with CJ on a fan club-only release entitled Fishing for Luckies. The mini-album included "Geordie In Wonderland", a song which Ginger had offered to Kevin Keegan and Newcastle United F.C. as a potential team anthem, although he had been graciously turned down. The track was performed on Top of the Pops with Wolfsbane's Jeff Hateley, painted in Toon Army colours, on mandolin.

The second Wildhearts album proper, P.H.U.Q., was released in May 1995 and reached number 6 in the UK Albums Chart, making it the band's most successful album. Shortly after the album's release, Mark Keds of Senseless Things was drafted as second guitarist, but lasted just one recording session, in which he appeared on the B-sides for the single "Just in Lust". Keds rejoined Senseless Things, and the band hired Jef Streatfield as a replacement.

In early 1996, the Wildhearts recorded more material. Only some of the songs saw the light of day on the Fishing for More Luckies album, a revamped version of Fishing for Luckies with eight new tracks. An additional album of new material was never quite finished, although leaked copies were distributed as the Shitty Fuckin' Stupid Tracks bootleg. These rare tracks were officially released by East West in 1998 as part of the Landmines and Pantomimes rarities compilation.

In 1997 the band signed to Mushroom Records, and set about making another album. In November 1997, shortly before the release of Endless, Nameless, Ginger decided to split the band. The band toured Japan but cancelled a scheduled British tour.

Starting in 1997 the Wildhearts began to release multiple formats of singles. The band released the two singles from the album Endless, Nameless in multiple formats, including two CD singles with two B-sides on each, and a 7" single with one B-side, with all the songs from the "Anthem" single being cover versions.

The band have continued to multi-format since 1997, in particular with "Top of the World" in 2003, consisting of three CD singles, two with two B-sides and one with one B-side and the video for the song. The band released a full-length album consisting only of B-sides, Coupled With.

=== 2001–2005: Reformation ===
In early 2001 Ginger announced that he was reforming the Earth vs the Wildhearts lineup of the band for a tour later that year. This lineup (consisting of Ginger and CJ on guitars and vocals, Danny McCormack on bass and vocals, and Stidi on drums) soon ran into difficulty due to McCormack's battle against heroin addiction, and on several dates of the comeback tour Toshi (from support band AntiProduct) stood in as bassist. By 2002 McCormack was once again clean and the band started recording a new mini-album and also toured the UK. The tracks intended for the album were released in the UK in late 2002 across three formats of the "Vanilla Radio" single, and as the mini-album Riff After Riff After Motherfucking Riff in Japan. "Vanilla Radio" reached the top 30 in the UK singles chart, and in early 2003 work began on a full-length album. However, during recording, McCormack checked himself into a rehabilitation center to deal with an alcohol problem, leaving Ginger to play the bass parts on the songs that were newly recorded for the album. McCormack's place in the live band was filled by "Random" Jon Poole, who had already worked with Ginger on his Silver Ginger 5 side project.

The album The Wildhearts Must Be Destroyed, was released in 2003. The band signed a US record deal with Gearhead Records, which released Riff After Riff in 2004, a compilation of songs from the UK post-reformation singles (all of the songs from this release are also found on the Gut Records compilation Coupled With). Riff After Riff was the Wildhearts' first US release since Earth vs the Wildhearts in 1994. The release was also promoted by a tour, mostly as the support band for their ex-support band, the Darkness.

In early 2005, Ginger dissolved the Wildhearts again to briefly join the Brides of Destruction before setting out on his own as a full-time solo artist. Ginger then reformed the Wildhearts once again for a one-off gig at Scarborough Castle (Rock in the Castle) in September 2005. The 1994–1995 line-up of Ginger, CJ, McCormack, and Ritch Battersby played at this gig.

Once again, the Wildhearts reformed in December 2006 and played a single live show at the Wulfrun Hall in Wolverhampton. This line-up saw Ginger joined by CJ, Ritch Battersby and a new bassist, Scott Sorry (ex-Amen).

=== 2007–2010: Second reformation ===
In January 2007, the band spent a week in Tutbury Castle recording vocals and finishing their new self-titled album The Wildhearts. The album was released on 23 April, preceded two weeks earlier by the download-only single "The Sweetest Song". The album received favorable reviews in the British rock press, with the Sun newspaper giving it 5 out of 5 ("probably the rock album of the year") and Rocksound magazine also giving it full marks (10 out of 10). The band performed in New York, and toured the UK in April and May.

"The New Flesh" was released as a single on 1 October 2007. The video for the song was shot in black and white and featured a number of children, including Ginger's own son Jake. The band released "Destroy All Monsters" as their next single.

On 19 May 2008 the Wildhearts released the all-covers album Stop Us If You've Heard This One Before, Vol 1.. The first version of the album was a download-only collection of 12 tracks, followed by a full release with 15 tracks. In mid-2008, Rhino Records also released the three-CD compilation The Works. Described by the band as "licensed but unofficial", the compilation consists of album tracks and B-sides from the 1992–1996 era at East West Records.

The band traveled to Denmark to record their ninth studio album, ¡Chutzpah!, which was released on 31 August 2009, followed by a tour of the United Kingdom in September and October. At these shows, the band played the new record in its entirety, followed by an encore of older songs. Around the same time as the release of Chutzpah!, they won the award for Spirit of Independence at the 2009 Kerrang! Awards, as well as playing on the Bohemia stage during the very first UK Sonisphere Festival; a four-day music festival designed by those formerly behind the Download Festival.

On 25 November 2009 the Wildhearts announced the release of ¡Chutzpah! Jnr., a mini-album composed of tracks recorded during the Chutzpah sessions that were either unreleased or only appeared as bonus tracks on the Japanese version of ¡Chutzpah!. The eight-track CD was publicized as only being available at concerts during the coming "Merry Xmess 2009" tour.

=== 2010–2016: Hiatus ===
In 2010, Ginger joined as the guitarist for former Hanoi Rocks frontman Michael Monroe, who played the Download Festival on 12 June 2010. Ginger also performed as a solo act at the festival. Only Wildhearts songs were performed, as was the case for the Ginger & Friends December 2010 tour of the UK. The Michael Monroe album Sensory Overdrive, featuring Ginger, was released in 2011.

In December 2010, Ginger stated that he was unsure if the Wildhearts would ever reform. It would appear that the departure of Scott Sorry and retirement of Ritch Battersby led to the hiatus. Following this particularly with his renewed solo career, Ginger publicly stated a number of times on Formspring that he had absolutely no desire to revisit the Wildhearts and considered that period of his life over. Despite this, Ginger announced in August 2012 that the most recent Wildhearts line-up will reform for a one-off appearance in December. The Wildhearts' songs "Geordie in Wonderland" and "Dreaming in A" appeared in the 2012 UK feature film Life Just Is.

On 10 December 2012, it was announced that Scott Sorry had left the Wildhearts due to family commitments. He was replaced by former bassist Jon Poole for the December 2012 reunion show. The band went on to play a number of shows in early 2013 to celebrate the 20th anniversary of the release of Earth vs the Wildhearts. Such was the anniversary tour's success that a second leg took place in June of the same year. The Nottingham Rock City performance would subsequently be released as the 2014 live album Rock City vs the Wildhearts. Another UK tour took place in April 2014, this time with Scott Sorry back on bass. 2015 saw the 20th Anniversary of the release of P.H.U.Q. and another tour, this time with Jon Poole on bass duties.

=== 2016–2022: Third reformation ===
Prior to their Christmas tour in 2016, Ginger stated in an interview that the band would be recording a new album in 2017. Proceeds from the album went towards assisting McCormack's recuperation after the amputation of his lower right leg.

In August 2018, the band announced it would be touring to celebrate 25 years of the Earth vs the Wildhearts album, in which the album would be played in full at each shows. The lineup for this tour included Ginger, CJ, Danny McCormack, and Ritch Battersby. In early January 2019, the band announced the recording of a new album had been completed with mixing to follow. The album Renaissance Men was released on 3 May 2019. The album 21st Century Love Songs was released on 3 September 2021. Six months after the album's release on 11 March 2022, the Wildhearts announced via social media that they were taking another hiatus, with the latest lineup splitting acrimoniously.

In May 2023 bassist Danny McCormack released his autobiography I Danny McCormack, Once a Wildheart, Always a Wildheart. Written with journalist Guy Shankland, the book was self-published and printed by B&B Press. The book's release was delayed due to the threat of legal action from one of McCormack's former bandmates.

=== 2024–present: New lineup ===
In early 2024, Ginger announced another new line up of the Wildhearts with returning bassist Jon Poole, guitarist Ben Marsden, and drummer Pontus Snibb; with a world tour completed that year. The album Satanic Rites of the Wildhearts was released on March 7, 2025, with a short tour of the United Kingdom by this line up to follow.

Ginger announced in March 2026 he had been diagnosed with mantle cell lymphoma, an aggressive form of cancer, but was continuing to write the next album for the band. He later stated in an Instagram post that he would not undergo treatment, and would spend the next two or three years saying his goodbyes. CJ confirmed in a social media post in March 2026 that Ginger and himself were back in contact after a three year break following Ginger's diagnosis. In April 2026, the band played the first day of Takedown Festival 2026.

== Members ==
Current members

- Ginger Wildheart – lead vocals, guitar (1989–1997, 1998, 1999, 2001–2022, 2024–present)
- "Random" Jon Poole – bass, backing vocals (2003–2005, 2012–2013, 2015–2018, 2024–present)
- Ben Marsden – guitar, backing vocals (2024–present)
- Charles Evans – drums (2024–present)
- Carol Hodge – keyboards, occasional lead vocals (2024–present)

Former members

- CJ Wildheart – guitar, backing vocals (1989–1994, 2001–2022)
- Julien "Joolz" Dean – bass (1989–1991)
- Stuart "Snake" Neale – lead vocals (1989–1990, 1990–1991)
- Andrew "Stidi" Stidolph – drums (1989–1990, 1992–1993, 2001–2005)
- Pat "Panache" Walters – drums (1990–1991)
- Dunken Francis Mullett – lead vocals (1990)
- Danny McCormack – bass, backing vocals (1991–1997, 1998, 1999, 2001–2003, 2005, 2018–2022)
- Bam Ross – drums (1991–1992)
- Ritch Battersby – drums, backing vocals (1993–1997, 1998, 1999, 2005–2022)
- Jef Streatfield – guitar, backing vocals (1995–1997, 1998, 1999)
- Scott Sorry – bass, backing vocals (2006–2012, 2013–2015)

== Discography ==
- Earth vs the Wildhearts (1993)
- P.H.U.Q. (1995)
- Fishing for Luckies (1996)
- Endless, Nameless (1997)
- The Wildhearts Must Be Destroyed (2003)
- The Wildhearts (2007)
- Stop Us If You've Heard This One Before, Vol 1. (2008)
- ¡Chutzpah! (2009)
- Renaissance Men (2019)
- 21st Century Love Songs (2021)
- Satanic Rites of the Wildhearts (2025)
