= CJ Wildheart =

British musician (born 1967)

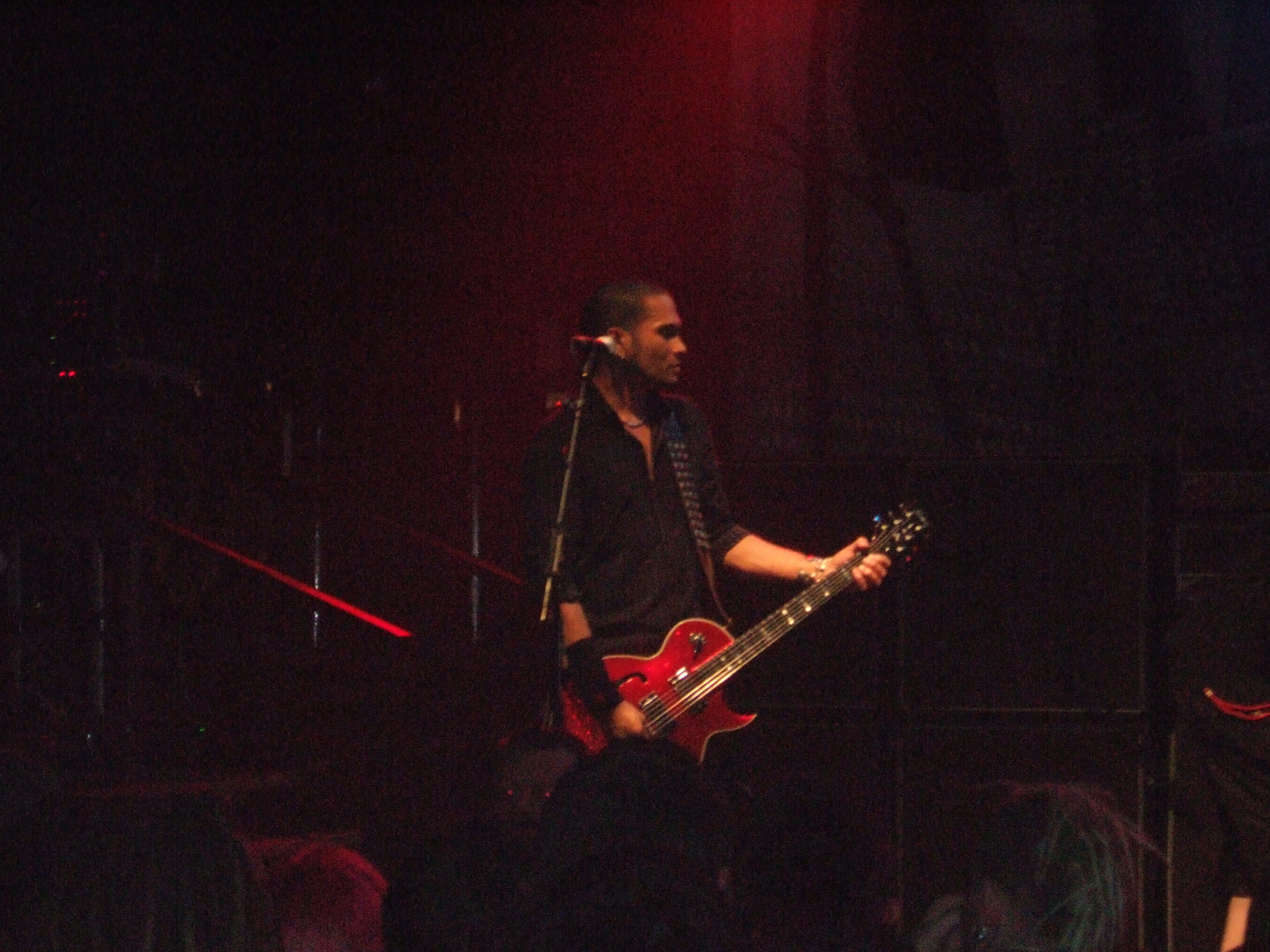

Background information
- Also known as: Chris Jaghdar; CJ
- Born: Christopher Paul Persaud-Jagdhar; 27 December 1967 (age 58); Colchester, Essex, England
- Genres: Rock
- Occupations: Singer; guitarist; songwriter
- Instruments: Guitar; vocals
- Years active: 1988–present
- Formerly of: The Wildhearts; Honeycrack; The Jellys

Christopher Paul Persaud-Jagdhar (born 27 December 1967), known professionally as CJ Wildheart, is an English musician of Guyanese and Seychellois descent. He is a solo artist and also a founding member of the rock band the Wildhearts. He was born in Colchester, and his early childhood was spent living in various military bases in Malaysia and Europe whilst his father and mother served in the British army. The family eventually moved back to the UK during his teens.

== Biography ==
CJ was involved with several local bands including Medusa, before achieving his first notable success in the late 1980s as the guitarist for London-based hair rockers Tattooed Love Boys. The band released their debut album Bleeding Hearts and Needle Marks in 1988 before splitting up shortly afterwards.

In 1989 CJ formed the Wildhearts with ex-the Quireboys guitarist Ginger. Despite being plagued by widely reported drug and alcohol problems, the band enjoyed considerable mainstream success during the early 1990s, including two UK top 20 hits. In 1994, at their commercial peak, CJ was unexpectedly kicked out during the recording of the P.H.U.Q. album due to personal differences between himself and Ginger.

CJ joined former Grip frontman Willie Dowling to form Honeycrack in 1995; that band signed to Epic Records. They released one album Prozaic in 1996 which charted at number 34 in the UK. Honeycrack toured with the likes of Alanis Morissette, Weezer, and Skunk Anansie throughout 1995 and 1996 and appeared at the Phoenix Festival and T in The Park. The band broke away from Epic in late 1996 and eventually disbanded. In 1998 CJ formed The Jellys with ex-Wildhearts drummer Stidi and former Wolfsbane bassist Jeff Hately. They released two studio albums and one live album between 1998 and 2001.

CJ released his first solo album Thirteen in 2007 under the moniker CJ & The Satellites. The album was supported with live dates in the UK and China but the project was put on hiatus due to the reformation of the Wildhearts in 2009. The album was reissued on CD and vinyl in 2014. Also in 2014, during a Wildhearts hiatus, CJ released the album Mable, which was funded through the Pledgemusic platform. Mable reached number 23 in the UK album chart; it also reached number 2 in the Official UK Rock Chart and number 2 in the Independent Album Breakers Chart, CJ's highest chart positions as a solo artist. Reviews were positive across the board. Uber Rock commented "Not many albums will touch Mable this year". The album scored highly in end of year poll lists including number 2 the Pure Rawk album of the year list, number 6 in the Uber Rock album of the year list, and number 1 in the Rock 'n' Roll Geek Show album of the year list. On 6 March 2015 Mable received the Album of the Year award at the Pure Rawk Awards held in London.

CJ released two more albums funded by pledge campaigns: Robot in 2015 and Blood in 2017. He has also launched his own brand of hot sauce called "Devilspit". He rejoined the Wildhearts for another reformation of that band in 2018.

== Solo discography ==
- Thirteen (2007) – as CJ and the Satellites
- Mable (2014)
- Robot (2015)
- Blood (2017)
- Siege (2020) – mini album
- Lives (2022) – compilation
- Kicks (2023) – live album
- Split (2023)
- Slots (2025)
- Devil (2026) - Will be released June 2026
