= Danny Greenspoon =

Canadian music producer

Danny Greenspoon is a Canadian music producer, music engineer, guitar player and film composer mainly in the Canadian music industry. Greenspoon is also the president of "The Audio Truck Inc.", a mobile recording studio recording materials for television, radio, and record. From 1989 to 1996, he was a recording producer for CBC Radio in Toronto producing recordings of jazz, popular music, folk music, country music and world music, for broadcast and commercial release, and from 2004 to 2016 he did most of the live recording for JazzFM91.

== Early life ==
Originally from Montreal, during the early part of his career, Greenspoon was a performer primarily on the acoustic music scene, travelling across Canada and the United States.

== Career ==
In 1978, he moved to Toronto to join Sylvia Tyson and The Great Speckled Bird, and later became a guitarist for many other prominent Canadian acts, such as Murray McLauchlan, Kate & Anna McGarrigle, and was also a member of the quirky mid 1980's act, The Romaniacs. Greenspoon played, as part of The Great Speckled Bird, for both seasons of Sylvia Tyson's CBC TV show Country In My Soul (1982–1983) and also played guitar for the entire 5 season run of the CBC Radio show Swinging On A Star (1989–1994) hosted by Murray McLauchlan which featured top acts from Canada and the US in an acoustic, live-to-tape, informal setting.

From 1990 to 1996, he was the principal popular music producer for CBC Radio in Toronto, producing hundreds of recordings in the Jazz, Folk and Pop genres, both live and in studio. He was also the co-producer of the show Hot Ticket which showcased both Canadian and international acts in concert.

From 1996 to the present, he has been the owner and chief engineer of The Audio Truck Inc., a mobile recording studio recording all genres of music.

Greenspoon has produced over 50 albums mainly in Canada for Great Big Sea, Spirit of the West, Jane Bunnett, Ian Tyson, Willie P. Bennett, Joel Kroeker, Susan Crowe, The Paperboys, The Barra MacNeils, The Good Brothers, The Pukka Orchestra, and Victoria Williams, among many others.

Most notable productions with certified platinum sales were:

- 5× Platinum sales for Great Big Sea album Play
- 3× Platinum sales for Great Big Sea album Up
- Platinum sales for Spirit of the West album Save This House

== Nominations / awards ==
- Received Gemini Award for Best Original Music Score for the documentary My Grandparents Had A Hotel (1991).
- Received Gemini Award for Best Sound In a Comedy, Variety or Performing Arts Program The Gospel Challenge (2007)
- Albums produced by Danny Greenspoon have been nominated 18 times for Juno nominations winning 4 Juno Awards.
- Albums produced by him have also won six East Coast Music Awards including:
  - Album of the Year for Great Big Sea (1998)
  - Single of the Year for Great Big Sea (1998)
  - Album of The Year for Bruce Guthro (2002)
- Nominated as Producer of the Year in Maple Blues Awards (2002)
- Nominated as Jazz Producer of the Year at the National Jazz Awards (twice, 2004 and 2005)
- Received 2003 Canadian Independent Music Award for Country Album Of The Year - The Good Brothers, One True Thing

== Production credits ==
- Pukka Orchestra – 1982
- Sylvia Tyson "Up In Smoke"- 1982
- Prairie Oyster "Oyster Tracks"- 1983 (JUNO Awards - 1983, 1984)
- Colin Linden - 1984
- Rang Tango - 1985
- Romaniacs "Ethno Fusion" - 1986
- Willie P. Bennett, The Lucky Ones (1986)
- Vektor - 1987
- Spirit of the West, Labour Day
- Jack de Keyzer - 1988
- Spirit of the West, Save This House
- The Hitmen - 1991
- Melwood Cutlery - 1992
- Jane Bunnett "Spirits Of Havana" - 1992 (JUNO Award - 1992)
- Gwen Swick - 1992
- Arlene Bishop - 1992
- Rita Chiarelli - 1993
- Gloria Blizzard - 1993
- Finjan "Crossing Selkirk Avenue" - 1993 (JUNO Award nominee)
- Shuffle Demons "Extra Crispy" - 1994
- Lenny Solomon "The Gershwin Sessions" - 1995
- Kumbaya Festival '95 - 1995
- Holly Cole "Live with the TSO" - 1995
- Victoria Williams "Live In Toronto" - 1995
- Great Big Sea "UP" - 1995 (Certified 4 times Platinum)
- Flying Bulgar Klezmer Band "FIRE" - 1996, 1997 (JUNO Award nominee)
- Stephen Barry Band - "The Gold Record" - 1997
- Jane Bunnett - "Chamalongo" – 1997 (JUNO Award nominee)
- Andy J. Forest - "Live At The Rainbow" - 1998
- Great Big Sea "PLAY" – 1997 (Certified Triple Platinum, 5 ECMA's) (JUNO Award nominee)
- Quartette - "IN THE BEAUTY OF THE DAY" – 1998
- Ian Tyson "Lost Herd" - 1999
- Lee Pui Ming – "Taklamakan" - 1999
- Tony D. – "Live Like Hell" - 1999
- Barra MacNeils – "Racket In The Attic" – 1999 (2001 JUNO nominee)
- Clay Tyson – "Kick It Down" - 2000
- The Punters – "Will You Wait" (Radio mix)
- Paperboys – "Postcards" – 2000 (2001 JUNO nominee)
- Rita Chiarelli - "Breakfast At Midnight" 2000 (2002 JUNO nominee)
- Sylvia Tyson - "River Road and Other Stories" - 2000
- John McDermott – "A Day To Myself" - 2000
- Beyond The Pale – "Routes" - 2000
- Heillig Manoeuvre - 2001
- Francois Bourassa Trio with Andre Leroux– "Live" (Engineer) (2002 JUNO Award)
- Thermal Quartet – "Soaring" - 2001
- Bruce Guthro – "Guthro" – 2001 (2002 ECMA – Album Of The Year)
- Susie Arioli Swing Band – "Pennies From Heaven" –2001 (2003 JUNO nominee)
- Andy Poole with The Canadian Jazz Quartet - 2002
- Suzie Vinnick – "33 Stars" – 2002
- The Good Brothers – "One True Thing" – 2002 (2003 Canadian Independent Music Award for Country Album of The Year)
- Quartette – "I See A Star" – 2002
- Colm Wilkinson – "Some Of My Best Friends Are Songs" - 2002
- Susan Crowe – "Book Of Days" – 2003 (2004 JUNO Nominee)
- Heillig Manoeuvre – "Inmotion" - 2003
- Joel Kroeker – "Melodrama" - 2003
- John McDermott – "Day To Myself" - 2003
- Sophie Milman – "Sophie Milman" – 2004 (2006 JUNO nominee)
- Ian Tyson – "Songs From The Gravel Road" – 2005 (2006 JUNO nominee)
- Rachel Kane – 2005
- Don Freed – "Valley Of Green And Blue" - 2005
- Melissa Stylianou – "Sliding Down" - 2006
- Charlie A'Court – "Bring On The Storm" – 2006
- The Good Brothers – "Blind Faith" - 2006
- Joel Kroeker – "Closer To The Flame" – 2007
- Chantal Chamberland – "The Other Woman" - 2008
- Susan Crowe – "Greytown" - 2009
- Suzie Vinnick – "Me 'N Mabel" - 2011 (2011 JUNO Nominee)
- Cindy Church – "Sad Songs Make Me Happy" – 2012
- Quartette – "Rocks and Roses" - 2013
- Kim Erickson – "The Raven's Wing" - 2014
- Oscar With Love – Various Artists - A Tribute to Oscar Peterson (engineer) - 2016
- Whiskey Jack – "Rhymes and Good Times with Stompin' Tom" – 2019
- Ian and Sylvia – "The Lost Tapes" – 2019 (2021 CFMA Nominee)
- Nancy Ahern – "Capable Of Spring" - 2021
- Noah Zacharin – "Points of Light" – 2022
- Suzie Vinnick – “Fall Back Home" - 2022
- Sylvia Tyson – "At The End Of The Day" - 2023 (2024 JUNO Nominee)
