= Stop Us If You've Heard This One Before, Vol 1. =

Studio album by the Wildhearts
- Released: 19 May 2008
- Studios: Madhouse Studios (Luton, England)
- Genres: Hard rock; heavy metal; punk rock
- Length: 49:02
- Label: Round
- Producer: Jase Edwards

The Wildhearts chronology
The Works (2008)	Stop Us If You've Heard This One Before, Vol 1. (2008)	¡Chutzpah! (2009)

Stop Us If You've Heard This One Before, Vol 1. is the seventh studio album and first covers album by British rock band the Wildhearts. Recorded at Madhouse Studios with producer Jase Edwards, it was originally released as a digital download on 19 May 2008 by Round Records, before a physical release on 7 July 2008. The album reached number 48 on the UK Album Downloads Chart, number 16 on the UK Independent Albums Chart and number 20 on the UK Rock & Metal Albums Chart.

== Background ==
The Wildhearts announced Stop Us If You've Heard This One Before, Vol 1. in April 2008, describing it as "a collection of covers from some of The Wildhearts favourite bands". Starting on 21 April, the band uploaded a song from the album to their MySpace page each week, up to the date of the album's release. The songs uploaded were the covers of "Understanding Jane" by the Icicle Works on 21 April, "Unsung" by Helmet (with lead vocals by CJ Wildheart) on 28 April, "Carmelita" by Warren Zevon (with lead vocals by Scott Sorry) on 5 May, and "Ice Hockey Hair" by Super Furry Animals (with lead vocals by Ritch Battersby) on 12 May. Following its initial release as a 12-track download on 19 May, Stop Us If You've Heard This One Before, Vol 1. was released on physical formats on 7 July 2008.

== Reception ==
=== Commercial ===
Stop Us If You've Heard This One Before, Vol 1. was the band's first studio album not to register on the main UK Albums Chart; upon its initial release in May 2008 as a 12-track digital download, it registered at number 48 on the UK Album Downloads Chart. Following its 15-track physical version release in July, the album reached number 16 on the UK Independent Albums Chart and number 20 on the UK Rock & Metal Albums Chart.

=== Critical ===
Professional ratings
Review scores
Source	Rating
AllMusic	2.5/5 stars

Critical response to Stop Us If You've Heard This One Before, Vol 1. was mixed. Reviewing the album for the website AllMusic, Jon O'Brien described the collection as "a passable if unremarkable stop-gap album", suggesting that the band's style is "already so similar [to that of the songs' original artists] that it renders the album's whole concept rather pointless". Awarding the album 2.5 out of five stars, O'Brien praised the choice of "obscure" songs to cover, but claimed that "if, as its title suggests, it's to be the first in a series, the band would do to delve a little deeper into their record collection next time round".

== Track listing ==
Digital download edition
No.	Title	Writer(s)	Original artist	Length
1.	"Unsung"	Page Hamilton	Helmet	3:53
2.	"The World Comes Tumblin'"	Brody Dalle	The Distillers	2:59
3.	"Understanding Jane"	Ian McNabb	The Icicle Works	3:21
4.	"Waiting Room"	Ian MacKaye; Guy Picciotto; Joe Lally; Brendan Canty	Fugazi	2:57
5.	"Geez Louise"	Matt Pierce; Mike Ruffino; Eugene Ferrari	The Unband	3:25
6.	"Ice Hockey Hair"	Gruff Rhys; Huw Bunford; Guto Pryce; Cian Ciaran; Dafydd Ieuan	Super Furry Animals	5:39
7.	"Rocket 69"	Rick Sims; Dredge; James Meat	The Lee Harvey Oswald Band	3:17
8.	"Possum Kingdom"	Vaden Todd Lewis	Toadies	4:13
9.	"Rearrange You"	Chris Gordon; Grant McFarlane; Bobby Dunn; Davy Greenwood	Baby Chaos	1:44
10.	"Pep Talk"	Milo Aukerman; Bill Stevenson	Descendents	2:55
11.	"Battleship Chains"	Terry Anderson	The Woods	3:27
12.	"Carmelita"	Warren Zevon	Murray McLauchlan	3:20
Total length:				41:10

Physical edition
No.	Title	Writer(s)	Original artist	Length
1.	"AC Rocket"	Hugh Duggie; Colin McInally; Shug Anderson; Jim Anderson	Foil	2:25
2.	"Geez Louise"	Pierce; Ruffino; Ferrari	The Unband	3:25
3.	"Understanding Jane"	McNabb	The Icicle Works	3:21
4.	"The World Comes Tumblin'"	Dalle	The Distillers	2:59
5.	"Unsung"	Hamilton	Helmet	3:53
6.	"Waiting Room"	MacKaye; Picciotto; Lally; Canty	Fugazi	2:57
7.	"Ice Hockey Hair"	Rhys; Bunford; Pryce; Ciaran; Ieuan	Super Furry Animals	5:39
8.	"Possum Kingdom"	Lewis	Toadies	4:13
9.	"Pep Talk"	Aukerman; Stevenson	Descendents	2:55
10.	"Rocket 69"	Sims; Dredge; Meat	The Lee Harvey Oswald Band	3:17
11.	"Battleship Chains"	T. Anderson	The Woods	3:27
12.	"Rearrange You"	Gordon; McFarlane; Dunn; Greenwood	Baby Chaos	1:44
13.	"Everyday Formula"	Quan Yeomans	Regurgitator	2:13
14.	"The Judge"	Dave Pirner	Soul Asylum	3:14
15.	"Carmelita"	Zevon	Murray McLauchlan	3:20
Total length:				49:02

== Personnel ==
The Wildhearts

- Ginger Wildheart – lead and backing vocals, guitar
- CJ Wildheart – guitar, backing and lead vocals
- Scott Sorry – bass, backing and lead vocals
- Ritch Battersby – drums, backing and lead vocals

Additional personnel

- Jase Edwards – production, engineering, mastering
- Andy Hunns – artwork, concept, design

== Charts ==
Chart performance for Stop Us If You've Heard This One Before, Vol 1.
Chart (2008)	Peak position
UK Album Downloads (OCC)	48
UK Independent Albums (OCC)	16
UK Rock & Metal Albums (OCC)	20
