= Colleen Peterson =

Canadian singer

- Birth name: Colleen Susan Peterson
- Born: November 14, 1950
- Origin: Peterborough, Ontario, Canada
- Died: October 9, 1996 (aged 45); Toronto, Ontario, Canada
- Genres: Country/Folk
- Occupation: Singer
- Years active: 1976–1996
- Website: Colleen Peterson Tribute

Colleen Susan Peterson (November 14, 1950 – October 9, 1996) was a Canadian country and folk singer, who performed both as a solo artist and as a member of the band Quartette.

== Career ==
Peterson began performing in coffeehouses in Ottawa in 1966. She won an RPM Gold Leaf Award for Most Promising Female Vocalist in 1967 and, in 1968, joined Bruce Cockburn, David Wiffen, Richard Patterson and Dennis Pendrith in a later version of the folk band 3's a Crowd. She then joined the band TCB that recorded an album on the Traffic label. She left after that. In 1970, she was cast in the Canadian production of Hair.

She subsequently moved to Kingston in 1971, forming the band Spriggs and Bringle with Mark Haines. She then relocated to Nashville in 1974, and released her first solo album, Beginning to Feel Like Home, in 1976. She had a hit single on the Billboard country charts with "Souvenirs", and won a Juno Award for Most Promising Female Vocalist in 1977.

Following her 1978 album Taking My Boots Off, Peterson did not record new material for several years, although she appeared on two albums by the Charlie Daniels Band in 1980 and 1981. She continued to perform, however, touring with Gordon Lightfoot, Tom Waits and Ry Cooder, hosting television specials and appearing on Spirit of the Country and The Tommy Hunter Show, and working as a backing vocalist for Waylon Jennings, Roger Miller, Janie Fricke and Marty Stuart. Artists such as Anne Murray, Ronnie Prophet and Sylvia Tyson also recorded Peterson's songs.

In 1986 Peterson released the single "I Had It All", which was a hit on the Canadian country charts and launched the most successful phase of her career. She released the album Basic Facts, her first in ten years, in 1988, and had a string of ten hits, including "No Pain, No Gain", which hit No. 1 on the Canadian country charts in 1991.

In 1993, she joined Tyson, Caitlin Hanford and Cindy Church for a one-off concert at Toronto's Harbourfront, and the four later also appeared together on CBC Radio's Morningside and on A Prairie Home Companion in the United States. Due to favourable audience response to the collaboration, they continued to work together, adopting the name Quartette and releasing their first album in 1994.

== Death ==
Peterson toured and recorded with Quartette until 1996, when she was diagnosed with cancer. Unable to perform with the band during her cancer treatment, she chose her friend and collaborator Gwen Swick to fill in for her, and died in Toronto on October 9 of that year. She is buried in Little Lake Cemetery in Peterborough, Ontario.

== Tributes ==
Peterson was inducted into the Ottawa Valley Country Music Hall of Fame in 1995. Additionally, she was posthumously inducted into the Canadian Country Music Hall of Fame in 2000. In 2003, the Colleen Peterson Songwriting Award, an award for young emerging songwriters, was created in her memory. In 2004, her friend and songwriting partner Nancy Simmonds worked with several musicians to produce a new album, Postcards from California, from unreleased demos she had recorded with Peterson in the early 1990s.

== Discography ==
=== Albums ===
Year	Album	Label
1976	Beginning to Feel Like Home	Capitol
1977	Colleen	Capitol
1978	Takin' My Boots Off	Capitol
1988	Basic Facts	Book Shop
1991	Let Me Down Easy	Intersound
1994	Beginning to Feel Like Home (re-release)	Capitol
1995	What Goes Around Comes Around (compilation)	EMI
2004	Postcards from California	EMI

=== Singles ===
Year	Single	Chart Positions			Album
Year	Single	CAN Country	CAN AC	US Country	Album
1976	"Don't It Make You Wanna Dance"	—	—	—	Beginning to Feel Like Home
1976	"Souvenirs"	38	—	100	Beginning to Feel Like Home
1978	"Beginning to Feel Like Home"	—	—	—	Beginning to Feel Like Home
1978	"Delaney"	—	—	—	Colleen
1986	"I Had It All"	50	—	—	Basic Facts
1986	"What a Fool I'd Be"	20	—	—	Basic Facts
1987	"Basic Fact of Life"	46	24	—	Basic Facts
1988	"I Still Think of You" (with Gilles Godard)	14	—	—	single only
1988	"Gently Lay Me Down"	55	—	—	Basic Facts
1989	"Weather the Storm"	44	—	—	Basic Facts
1991	"No Pain, No Gain"	14	—	—	Let Me Down Easy
1992	"I'm Not Just Another April Fool"	69	—	—	Let Me Down Easy
1993	"Code of the West"	78	—	—	single only
1993	"Deeper Waters"	68	—	—	Let Me Down Easy
1993	"Crazy"	29	—	—	What Goes Around Comes Around
1994	"Let's Try Love Again"	43	—	—	single only
1994	"Souvenirs" (re-release)	50	—	—	Beginning to Feel Like Home
1995	"What Goes Around Comes Around"	46	—	—	What Goes Around Comes Around
