= Closer to the Flame =

Closer to the Flame may refer to:

- Closer to the Flame (Dave Edmunds album), 1990
- Closer to the Flame (Joel Kroeker album), 2007
