= Pukka Orchestra =

Canadian new wave band

Background information
- Origin: Toronto, Ontario, Canada
- Genre: New wave
- Years active: 1979–present
- Labels: Solid Gold; A Major Label; Instant Replay
- Members: Graeme Williamson; Neil Chapman; Tony Duggan-Smith

Pukka Orchestra is a Canadian new wave band based in Toronto, Ontario. The group released two albums, an EP and several singles in the 1980s, including "Listen to the Radio," which hit the Canadian charts in 1984. They won a CASBY Award in 1985.

== History ==
The Pukka Orchestra was formed in Toronto in 1979. The core of the band consisted of vocalist/guitarist/songwriter Graeme Williamson and guitarists/co-songwriters Neil Chapman and Tony Duggan-Smith. The band's name is derived from the Hindi word pukka, which means "genuine," "authentic" and "first class." The name was coined by Duggan-Smith's extremely British grandfather who had been the harbourmaster of Calcutta and had later worked for Marconi. When Duggan-Smith told him he was playing music for a living his grandfather replied, "That's all very nice Tony, but don't bother with any mediocre bands, get yourself into a Pukka Orchestra." The band made frequent use of numerous guest musicians, jokingly commenting "Are you in the Pukka Orchestra? Why not, everyone else is."

The band released an independent single, "Rubber Girl," in 1981 (B side "Do the Slither") and just after that they recorded "Wonderful Time To Be Young" and "Spies Of The Heart" with Danny Greenspoon at Inception Sound, all three making it on to the first album.

They performed regularly in Toronto's Queen Street West club scene, usually at The Bamboo, The Cameron House, The Horseshoe Tavern and Grossman's Tavern and signed to Solid Gold Records, releasing their self-titled debut album in 1984. In the summer of 1984, the band had a top 40 chart hit in Canada with a cover of Tom Robinson / Peter Gabriel's "Listen to the Radio." Other singles "Cherry Beach Express" and "Might As Well Be on Mars" received widespread FM radio play. The Toronto Police Service attempted to block radio airplay of "Cherry Beach Express" due to its themes of opposition to police brutality.

The band had just received a U-Know/CASBY Award for "Most Promising Group" when they received two setbacks. Their record company Solid Gold went into receivership as the album was climbing the charts; then, while visiting relatives in Scotland in late 1984, Williamson developed kidney problems. Williamson ended up staying in a Glasgow hospital for several months, and in 1985, Chapman, Duggan-Smith, Robert Priest, Colin Linden, Gwen Swick and other Toronto musicians held a benefit concert at The Bamboo Club to help defray Williamson's living expenses while receiving dialysis treatment. He eventually received a kidney transplant and returned to Toronto. The band recorded a four-song EP called Palace of Memory in 1987. However, in the midst of recording their second full-length album in 1988, Williamson's health took another turn and he went back to Scotland for treatment.

In 1992, The Pukka Orchestra released their final album Dear Harry, a compilation of three tracks from the 1987 EP (two of them remixed), and completed tracks from the temporarily shelved 1988 sessions.

The first Pukka Orchestra album was reissued in CD format in 2000 by Solid Gold Records/Casablanca Media.

The band regrouped, minus Williamson, for the Spirit of Radio Reunion show in 2003.

Williamson died in Glasgow in June 2020.

In 2024, Chapman and Duggan-Smith, with Williamson's widow Iris and Frank Davies, completed and released Chaos Is Come Again, reworking and remixing tracks from the Palace of Memory EP and Dear Harry sessions with additional instrumentation. The band resumed performing in 2025, appearing at the Stonebridge Wasaga Beach Blues Festival in September.

== Discography ==
- The Pukka Orchestra (1984)
- The Palace of Memory (EP) (1987)
- Dear Harry (1992)
- Chaos Is Come Again (2024)
