= Melodrama (Joel Kroeker album) =

Studio album (2004) by Joel Kroeker

Studio album by Joel Kroeker
- Released: 2004
- Recorded: 2004
- Label: True North
- Producer: Danny Greenspoon

Joel Kroeker chronology
Naive Bohemian (1999)	Melodrama (2004)	Closer to the Flame (2007)

Melodrama is the first studio album by Joel Kroeker and the second of his albums after his 1999 independent release CD Naive Bohemian. The album was released in 2004 on True North Records and was produced by Danny Greenspoon. It was registered at the "Canterbury Sound" in Toronto, Ontario, in Canada.

== Track listing ==
1. "Endings" (3:43)
2. "The Wind" (3:43)
3. "Goodbye Jane" (3:18)
4. "Soft" (4:16)
5. "Paradise" (3:25)
6. "Song For a Person on a Bridge" (4:38)
7. "The Smallest Room" (3:52)
8. "Your Painted Face" (3:02)
9. "Simple" (4:48)
10. "Naked Beauty" (3:11)
11. "With Me" (3:20)
12. "Blue Moon Lounge" (3:48)

== Single from the album ==
- "Goodbye Jane"

== Personnel ==
- Joel Kroeker - vocals
- Kevin Breit - guitar
- Gary Breit - keyboards
- Gary Craig - drums
- George Koller - bass guitar
- Kathryn Rose - backing vocals
- Suzie Vinnick - backing vocals
- Randy Bachman - guitar on "With Me"
