= Only the Silence Remains =

Live album by Murray McLauchlan
- Released: 1975
- Recorded: April 26, 1975
- Venue: Rebecca Cohn Theatre, Dalhousie Arts Centre, Halifax, Nova Scotia
- Label: True North
- Producer: Murray McLauchlan, Bernie Finkelstein

Murray McLauchlan chronology
Sweeping the Spotlight Away (1974)	Only the Silence Remains (1975)	Boulevard (1976)

Only the Silence Remains is a 1975 album by Canadian singer-songwriter Murray McLauchlan. It was released as a double album. McLauchlan is accompanied by Dennis Pendrith on bass guitar. True North re-released it as a Digital Download in 2012.

== Track listing ==
All tracks are written by Murray McLauchlan unless otherwise noted.

No.	Title	Writer(s)	Length
1.	"One Night By My Window"		4:42
2.	"Honky Red"		7:15
3.	"Rye Whiskey"	Traditional	2:05
4.	"Old Man's Song"		3:40
5.	"Down by the Henry Moore"		4:00
6.	"You Need a New Lover Now"		3:51
7.	"So Far From You"		3:54
8.	"Linda (Won'tcha Take Me In)"		3:11
9.	"Farmer's Song"		3:30
10.	"Golden Trumpet"		8:44
11.	"Two-bit Nobody"		4:47
12.	"Billy McDaniels"		3:38
13.	"Child's Song"		4:59
14.	"Maybe Tonight"		4:20
15.	"I Met You At the Bottom"		4:07
16.	"Back on the Street"		4:19

== Personnel ==
- Murray McLauchlan – vocals, guitar, harmonica, piano
- Dennis Pendrith – bass

Technical

- Bill Siddon, Al Feeney – engineer
- Bart Schoales – photography, artwork
