= Susan Crowe =

Canadian folk singer-songwriter

- Born: Halifax, Nova Scotia
- Genres: Folk
- Occupation: Singer-songwriter
- Instruments: Singing guitar
- Years active: 1970s–1980s, 1994–present
- Label: Corvus
- Website: susancrowe.com

Susan Crowe is a Canadian folk singer-songwriter. She was the 2009 Canadian Folk Music Awards English songwriter of the year and has been nominated for two Juno Awards.

== Career ==
Crowe's interest in music began when her father and mother enrolled her in piano lessons as a child. While she did not enjoy the piano, she began playing her older brother's guitar. Crowe was writing songs by the time she was 11 years old and performing in coffee houses at age 19. She performed at coffee houses and folk clubs in the Halifax, Nova Scotia area through the late 1970s.

In 1980, Crowe moved to Toronto, Ontario to further her musical career and help her partner through medical school by working as a waitress and at the Canada Post. Eight years later she moved to Vancouver, British Columbia, where she worked multiple jobs, including stints as a waitress, art gallery assistant, mail carrier and beekeeper.

Crowe returned to music in 1994 and released her first album, This Far From Home, that same year. The production of This Far From Home was paid for using proceeds from a coffee shop located in the south side of Vancouver that Crowe had opened. This Far From Home was nominated for the 1996 Juno award for Best Roots & Traditional Album: Solo. In 1996 she also released her second album, The Door to the River. Her third album, A Pilgrim's Mirror, was released in 2000. A Pilgrim's Mirror was nominated for a West Coast Music Award.

In the early 2000s Crowe toured the Czech Republic with artists including Katherine Wheatley and Lenka Slaba. She joined Laura Smith and Cindy Church to form the trio brava in 2002 at the urging of music agent Chris Hopkins. brava toured throughout Canada from 2003 to 2004.

Crowe released Book of Days, her fourth album, in 2003. Book of Days was produced by Danny Greenspoon and was nominated for two awards: the 2004 Juno award for Roots & Traditional Album of the Year: Solo, and the 2004 East Coast Music Association award for Roots / Traditional Solo Artist of the Year. She also won Music Nova Scotia's 2004 Female Artist of the Year award for her work on Book of Days. Five years later, in 2009, Crowe released Greytown, which was also produced by Greenspoon. Her work on Greytown earned Crowe the 2009 Canadian Folk Music Award for English Songwriter of the year.

She served as executive producer for All the Diamonds, Raylene Rankin's final album.

== Associated acts ==
From 2003–2004, Crowe toured throughout Canada with Laura Smith and Cindy Church as a member of the group brava. In 2007, Crowe reunited with Church when she, Church and Raylene Rankin formed the group Rankin, Church & Crowe. Rankin, Church & Crowe released a live album entitled Live at Alderney Landing in 2008. Rankin, Church and Crowe toured together until fall 2011 when Rankin underwent treatment for a recurrence of cancer. Following Rankin's death in 2012, Crowe began performing less and concentrating on Corvus Records, her record label.

== Corvus Records ==
Susan Crowe founded Corvus Records in 1996 to help independent artists complete recording projects. Artists signed to Corvus include John Reischman, John Reischman and The Jaybirds, John Miller, Nick Hornbuckle, and Susan Crowe. Raylene Rankin was also signed to Corvus Records prior to her death in 2012.

== Albums ==
- 1994: This Far From Home
- 1995: The Door to the River
- 1998: A Pilgrim's Mirror
- 2004: Book of Days
- 2009: Greytown

== Awards and nominations ==
- 1995: Juno Award Nominee in the Best Roots/Traditional Solo Recording category
- 1997: West Coast Music Award nominee
- 2004: Music Industry of Nova Scotia's Best Female Artist Award
- 2004: Juno Award Nominee in the Best Roots/Traditional Solo Recording category
- 2004: East Coast Music Award Nominee
- 2005: East Coast Music Award Nominee
- 2009: English Songwriter of the Year at the Canadian Folk Music Awards
