= Closer to the Flame (Joel Kroeker album) =

Studio album by Joel Kroeker
- Released: 2007
- Recorded: 2007
- Label: True North
- Producer: Danny Greenspoon

Joel Kroeker chronology
Melodrama (2004)	Closer to the Flame (2007)

Closer to the Flame is the second studio album by Joel Kroeker and the third of his albums, after his 1999 independent release CD Naive Bohemian and his 2004 release Melodrama.

The album was released in 2007 on True North Records and was produced by Danny Greenspoon. It was registered at Canterbury Sound in Toronto, Ontario in Canada.

== Track listing ==
1. "Against Myself"
2. "King of Hearts"
3. "Closer to the Flame"
4. "Good Stuff"
5. "Sacred Heart"
6. "Remember the Song"
7. "Hymn Number One"
8. "You Feel It"
9. "At the Drive In"
10. "Guide Us Home"
11. "Nothing But the Stars"
12. "These Quiet Streets"
13. "Déjà Vu" (Bonus track) (with Dany Bédar)

== Singles from the Album ==
- "Déjà Vu" (as a Joel Kroeker / Dany Bédar duo)
- "Against Myself"
