= Sorry and the Sinatras =

British-American punk rock band

- Origin: Philadelphia, Pennsylvania, US; London, England
- Genres: Hard rock, punk rock
- Years active: 2007–2010 or later
- Label: UnderGroove
- Past members: Roger "Rags" Segal; Danny Sinatra; Scott Sorry; Lenny Thomas; Dave Kerr; Rich Jones
- Website: Official MySpace

Sorry and the Sinatras were a punk rock-influenced hard rock band based in both Philadelphia, Pennsylvania and London, United Kingdom, formed in 2007. From 2010, the band was composed of Scott Sorry (The Wildhearts, formerly of Amen and Brides of Destruction), Dave Kerr (formerly of The Cherrykicks), Rich Jones (The Loyalties) and Lenny Thomas (formerly of Trashlight Vision). Previously the group had featured Danny Sinatra (formerly of Blackbelt) and Roger "Rags" Segal (formerly of Trashlight Vision).

To date, Sorry and the Sinatras have released one album, Highball Roller (2009), and a six-song EP Kings of Shambles Street (2012).

== History ==
=== Early years, Formation (2005–2007) ===
Scott Sorry met Roger Segal and Lenny Thomas in North Carolina while Sorry was on tour with his previous band Brides of Destruction in 2005. Segal and Thomas were both in Brides support act Trashlight Vision. Sorry started working on new material with Blackbelt guitarist Danny Sinatra when Trashlight Vision split up. Segal and Thomas then linked up with Sorry and Sinatra to form a new group. Initially the band was named The Sad Eyed Sinatras by Sorry before it was rechristened Sorry and the Sinatras by guitarist Sinatra in 2007. Sinatra left the group on March 24, 2008, stating on his Myspace blog that stress, health, and family issues were his reason for leaving but that he left the band on good terms. Dave Kerr formerly of The Cherrykicks was added as his replacement with the official lineup consisting of Sorry on lead vocals and rhythm guitar, Kerr on lead guitar, Segal on bass and Thomas on drums.

=== Highball Roller (2008–present) ===
On May 7, 2008, while touring the United States, the band posted on their Myspace that they signed a deal with UnderGroove Records and a release date for their debut album would be made by the end of 2008. They announced, in June, their first dates in the UK in August, taking place at The Asylum in Birmingham and at the Bar Academy in London. The group entered the studio in September in Barnsley, UK with producer Jason Sanderson. The album was completed in less than 3 weeks. Highball Roller was released May 11, 2009, which was generally well received by British music critics, with a tour of the UK planned but this was postponed until October with the band touring the East Coast of the US in August.

On February 2, 2010, new guitarist Rich Jones, who replaced bassist Roger Segal with Scott Sorry taken up the bass, announced the group were to tour the UK in April. On February 25, via Twitter, the group announced they had completed songs for a six-song EP.

== Discography ==
- Highball Roller (2009)
- The Kings Of Shambles Street E.P. (2012)

== Band members ==
=== Final lineup ===
- Scott Sorry – vocals (2007–end), rhythm guitar (2007–2010) bass (2010–end) (died 2025)
- Lenny Thomas – drums (2007–end) (died 2016)
- Dave Kerr – guitar, backing vocals (2008–end)
- Rich Jones – guitar (2010–end)

=== Former members ===
- Danny Sinatra – guitar, backing vocals (2007–2008)
- Roger "Rags" Segal – bass, backing vocals (2007–2010) (died 2022)
