= Sweeping the Spotlight Away =

Studio album by Murray McLauchlan
- Released: 1974
- Recorded: January–March 1974
- Studios: Thunder Sound, Toronto, Ontario
- Genres: Pop, rock
- Length: 36:56
- Label: True North
- Producers: Bernie Finkelstein, Murray McLauchlan

Murray McLauchlan chronology
Day to Day Dust (1973)	Sweeping the Spotlight Away (1974)	Only the Silence Remains (1975)

Professional ratings
Review scores
Source	Rating
Allmusic	link

Sweeping the Spotlight Away is a 1974 album by Canadian singer-songwriter Murray McLauchlan.

== Track listing ==
All songs by Murray McLauchlan.

1. "Down by the Henry Moore"
2. "The Next in Line"
3. "Honey, Let's Get Up and Dance"
4. "Shoeshine Workin' Song"
5. "Maybe Tonight"
6. "Takin' My Leave
7. "Do You Dream of Being Somebody"
8. "Ragged Hobo Bums"
9. "Sweeping the Spotlight Away"

== Personnel ==
- Murray McLauchlan – vocals, guitar, harmonica, piano
- Dennis Pendrith – bass
- Chris Parker – drums (tracks 1–3, 5–9)

with:

- Pat Godfrey – piano (track 1)
- Ben Mink – mandolin (track 1), fiddle (track 5)
- Mike McKenna – guitar (tracks 2, 7), slide guitar (tracks 5–6)
- Ron Dann – steel guitar (tracks 1, 2, 8)
- John Mills-Cockell – horn arrangement (track 3), strings arrangement (track 7)
- Eugene Amaro – clarinet (track 3), saxophone (track 6)
- Mike Stewart – saxophone (tracks 3, 6)
- Russ Little – trombone (track 3)
- Guido Basso – trumpet (track 3)
- Barry Keane – drums (track 4)
- Ollie Strong – steel guitar (track 4)
- Richard Armin, Paul Armin, Adele Armin, Gerard Kantarjian, Jaak Liivoja, William Richards, Harry Skura – strings (track 7)
- Catherine Smith – harmony vocals (track 7)
- Bruce Cockburn – guitar (track 9)

Technical

- Bill Seddon – recording and mix engineer
- Bart Schoales – art direction, design
- Wim Vanderkooy – cover photography
