= Molson Canadian Rocks for Toronto =

2003 benefit concert in Toronto

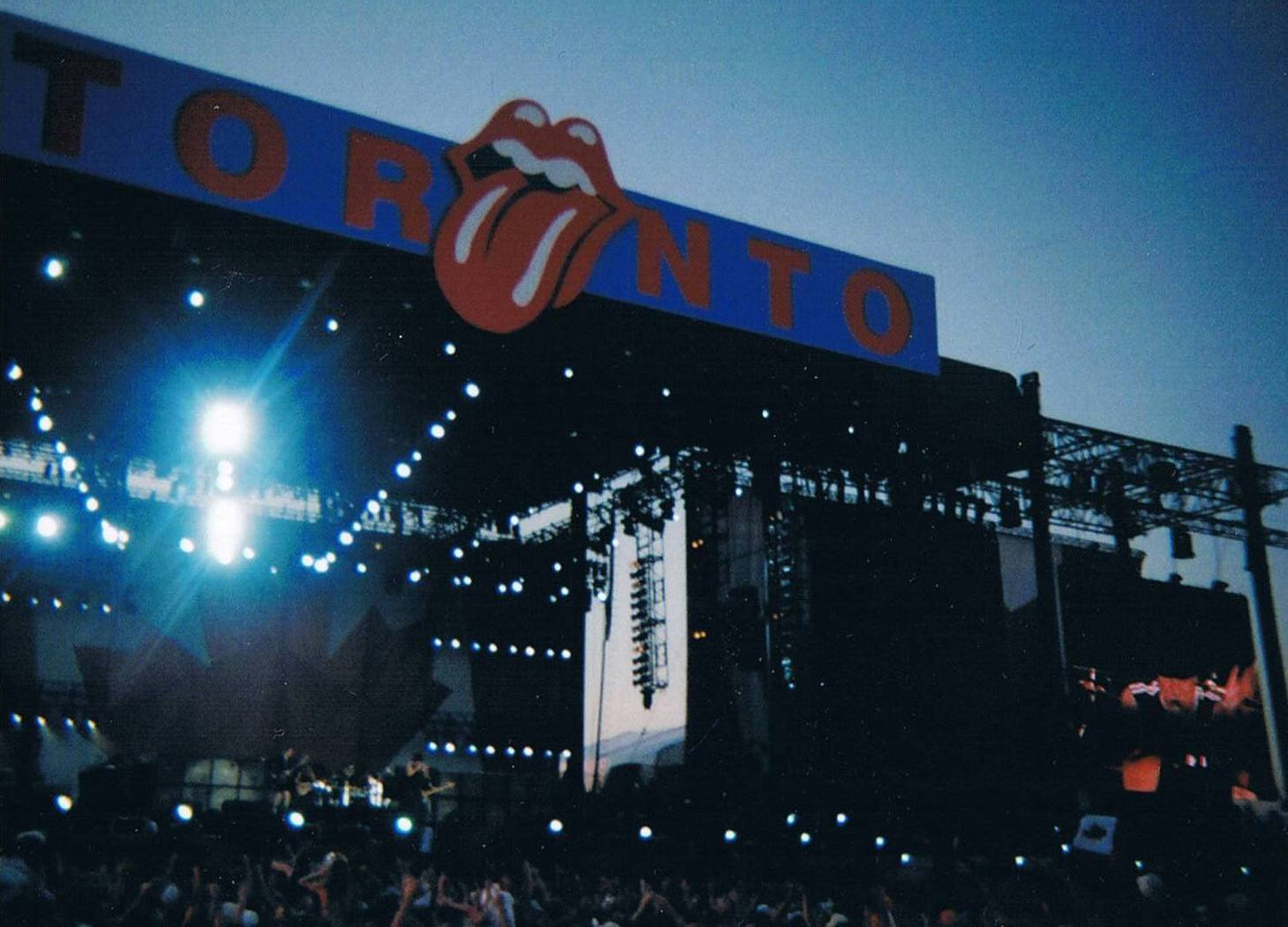
- Genre: Rock; pop; blues
- Dates: July 30, 2003
- Locations: Downsview Park, Toronto, Ontario, Canada
- Coordinates: 43.4434°N 079.2756°W
- Years active: 2003; 23 years ago
- Founders: David Russell; Jann Arden; Dan Aykroyd; Jim Belushi; Justin Bomberg
- Attendance: 450,000 to 500,000 people (estimate)
- Website: Toronto Rocks at IMDb

Molson Canadian Rocks for Toronto, also known as SARSfest or SARSStock, was a benefit rock concert that was held in Toronto, Ontario, Canada on July 30, 2003. An estimated 450,000 to 500,000 people attended the concert, making it the largest outdoor ticketed event in Canadian history and one of the largest events in North American history.

== Overview ==
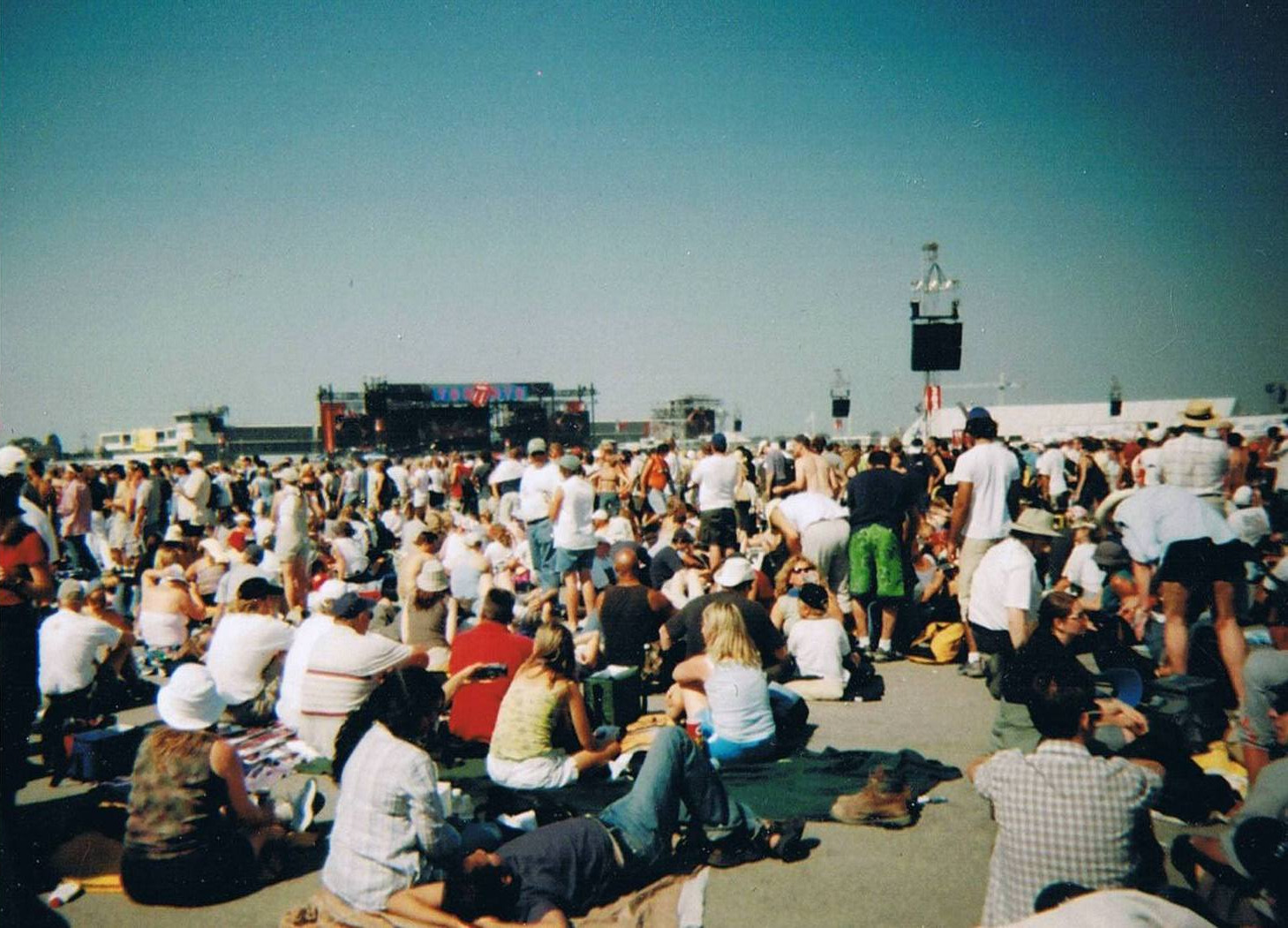
The crowd at Molson Canadian Rocks for Toronto on July 30, 2003

The concert was organized in about a month, upon the suggestion of headliners the Rolling Stones, who wanted to help revive Toronto's economy after the SARS outbreaks earlier in the year. The Rolling Stones have held tour rehearsals in Toronto on more than one occasion; Toronto was also the setting for Keith Richards's 1977 arrest and subsequent trial. When the Rolling Stones announced the concert, Toronto was still under a SARS warning from the World Health Organization. The publicity garnered by the SARS outbreak led to a downturn in Toronto's tourism industry, which the concert was intended to help revive.

Tickets for the concert went on sale on June 27, 2003 and cost $21.50 Canadian. The Canadian portion of 150,000 tickets sold out almost immediately and set a single-day record for the Canadian arm of Ticketmaster. Tickets were also available for purchase at Metro Inc. grocery stores in Ontario.

The concert was held at Downsview Park in northern Toronto, a former military base which also accommodated 800,000 people when Pope John Paul II visited the city in 2002. The concert was hosted by actor/singer Dan Aykroyd, and vendors sold Alberta beef in support of the Canadian beef industry, which had recently suffered because of a case of mad cow disease. North York General Hospital, which had been hit the hardest by the SARS outbreak in previous months, provided emergency on-site hospital services. The Toronto water department was initially supposed to provide free water by tapping the groundwater at the site, but were unable to do so due to health concerns. The Canadian Broadcasting Corporation (CBC) and cable music station MuchMoreMusic provided coverage of parts of the concert throughout the day, including the end of the Rolling Stones' set.

The concert opened in the afternoon with Have Love Will Travel Revue, including Aykroyd and James Belushi, Sam Roberts, Kathleen Edwards, La Chicane, the Tea Party, and the Flaming Lips who invited artists from backstage to dance on stage with them dressed in fuzzy animal costumes, Sass Jordan, the Isley Brothers, and Blue Rodeo. Each band performed for 15–20 minutes. The second part of the concert began later in the afternoon and lasted into the night and featured Justin Timberlake, the Guess Who, Rush, AC/DC, and the Rolling Stones, who performed a 90-minute set to end the concert.

Justin Timberlake was booed by the crowd, which was anticipating the harder-rocking second half of the concert. Throughout his performance, he had to dodge launched projectiles of water bottles, toilet paper, muffins, and other items thrown by the audience. He later returned to duet with Mick Jagger on "Miss You" and also for Justin Timberlake's "Cry Me a River". When some fans continued to throw bottles at Timberlake, the crowd was harangued by a visibly angry Keith Richards.

Rush was the last band to be added to the lineup. According to drummer Neil Peart, "When we were first asked to play Molson Canadian Rocks For Toronto, it seemed impossible to say yes. We had been off the road for 8 months, our gear was in the warehouse, most of our crew was out on other tours, and even we were all over the place - Geddy with his family in France, Alex working in the studio mixing our Rio de Janeiro show, and me on my motorcycle in the California mountains. However, when we thought about everything Toronto meant to our lives, to our work and play, our homes and families and friends, it seemed impossible to say no!"

A documentary DVD entitled Toronto Rocks was released in 2004, showing highlights of the event.

== Lineup ==
The Rolling Stones, AC/DC, Justin Timberlake, the Flaming Lips, Rush, the Guess Who, Sam Roberts, Blue Rodeo, the Isley Brothers, Sass Jordan, Sarah Harmer, the Tea Party, La Chicane, Kathleen Edwards, Jeff Healey, the Blues Brothers (Dan Aykroyd and Jim Belushi)

== See also ==
- List of historic rock festivals
- Hong Kong Harbour Fest, a similar event held in Hong Kong to revive the economy after SARS.
