= The Romaniacs =

Canadian rock band

- Origin: Canada
- Genres: Rock
- Years active: 1984–1995
- Past members: Calvin Cairns; Steve Bengtson; Scott White; William Butler; Danny Greenspoon; Ron Thompson; Richard Baker

The Romaniacs was a Canadian rock band based in Vancouver, British Columbia. Their music combined Eastern European, Gypsy jazz, and pop. They made extensive use of costumes and props, including a large map, during their live shows.

== History ==
The Romaniacs formed in 1984. They performed at first in clubs and small venues, telling an invented story of their ethnic history of the band members.

The band toured extensively in Canada and the United States.They had a long stint at the Saskatchewan Pavilion at Expo 86 in Vancouver, and that year released their first recording on cassette, entitled Ethno-Fusion. The group also toured Australia in 1988, including a week-long appearance at the Canada Pavilion during the World's Fair in Brisbane. That year they released their first album, World on Fire.

In 1990, the band contributed the song "Ecstasy of the Martyr" to the compilation album Polka Comes to Your Haus. The Romaniacs disbanded in 1995.

== Personnel ==
- Calvin Cairns (a.k.a. Myron Joseph, king romaniac) – violin
- Steve Bengtson (a.k.a. Steffy Levine) – mandolin and vocals
- Scott White – upright bass
- William (Billy) Butler – guitar
- Danny Greenspoon (a.k.a. Zoltan Flamingo Romaniac) – guitar
- Jim Vivian – upright bass
- Victor Bateman – upright bass
- Ron Thompson – guitar
- Richard Baker – guitar

== Discography ==
- Ethno-Fusion
- World on Fire
- The Ecstasy of the Martyr (a compilation released only in Japan)

== Bibliography ==
- The Canadian Society for Traditional Music. Retrieved 10 May 2007.
- Scott White's past details from scottwhite.net. Retrieved 10 May 2007.
