= Suzie Vinnick =

Canadian singer-songwriter

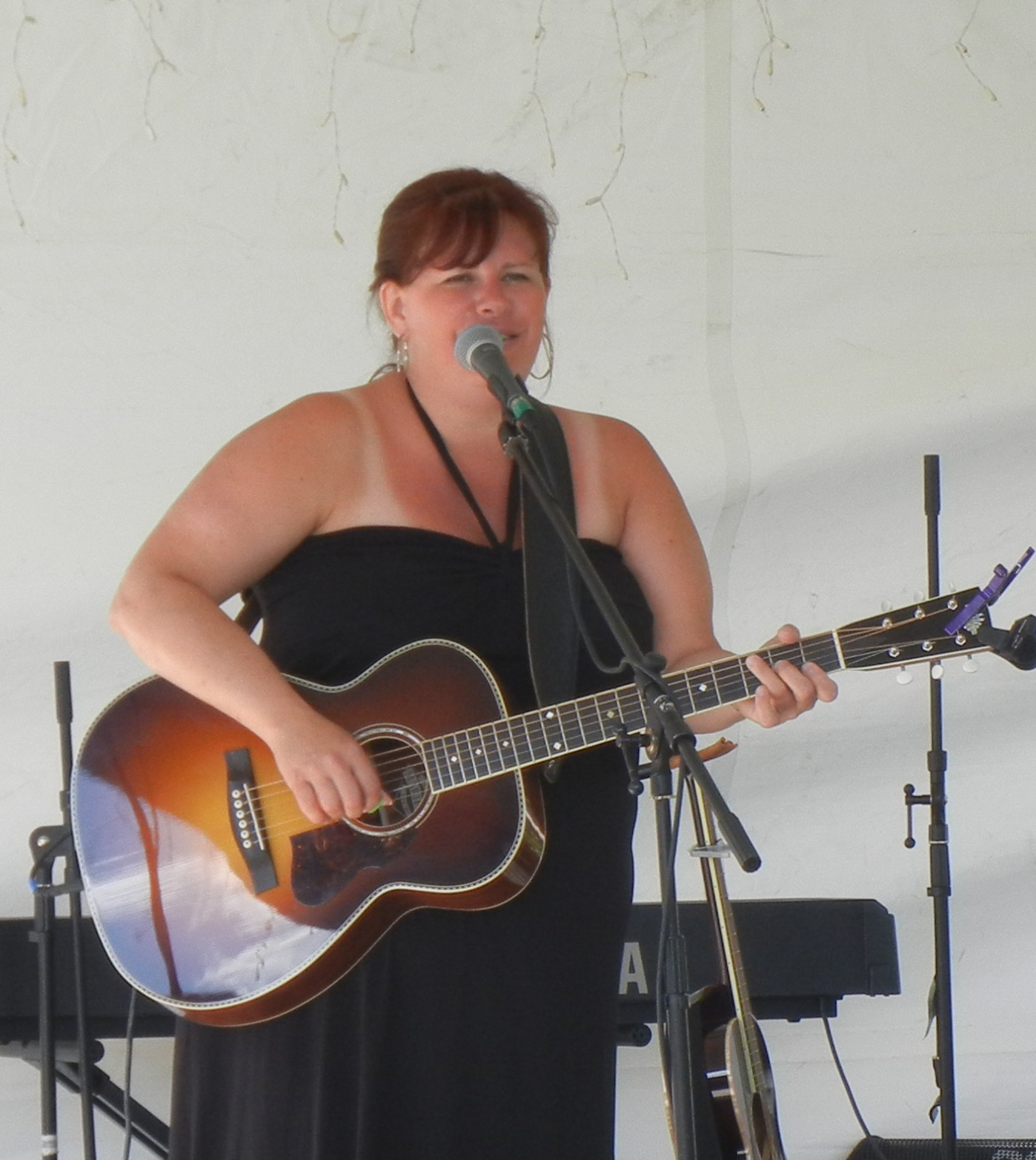

Background information
- Born: April 26, 1970 (age 56); Saskatoon, Saskatchewan, Canada
- Genres: blues, folk, country
- Occupations: Singer-songwriter, musician, composer
- Instruments: Vocals, guitar, bass guitar
- Years active: 1994–present
- Website: www.suzievinnick.com

Suzie Vinnick (born April 26, 1970) is a Canadian roots and blues singer-songwriter. She has won 12 Maple Blues Awards, including best female vocalist and best song writer. Her music has been used for advertising campaigns for brands including Tim Hortons and Tetley's Tea. In 2019 she was awarded the Special Recognition Award by the Saskatchewan Jazz Festival in recognition of her musical career.

== Personal life ==
Originally from Saskatoon, Saskatchewan, Vinnick moved to Ottawa in the early 1990s, and then to Toronto in 1997. She moved to Wainfleet in 2012 and currently resides there.Vinnick is of Ukrainian descent.

== Career ==
Vinnick is a self-taught multi-instrumentalist, playing bass, guitar, saxophone, piano, dobro, lap steel guitar and mandolin. She performs as a solo artist and also contributes to variety of band projects, including The Marigolds (with Gwen Swick and Caitlin Hanford), Vinnick Sheppard Harte (with Kim Sheppard and Elana Harte), Betty and the Bobs and as a duo with Rick Fines. She has also performed in the Persian Gulf and Bosnia for the Canadian Armed Forces. Her music has appeared in commercials for Tim Hortons, Interac, Ontario Foodland, Tetley's Tea and Shoppers Drug Mart, as well as the soundtracks for MVP: The Secret Lives of Hockey Wives, ReGenesis and the film A Touch of Grey.

== Discography ==
Year	Album	With
1992	Dig Deep	Tony D And His Cool Band
1994	Angel on the Sidelines	Solo
2000	And They All Rolled Over	Vinnick Sheppard Harte
2002	33 Stars	Solo
2005	The Marigolds	The Marigolds
2006	Nothing Halfway	Rick Fines
2006	Betty and the Bobs	Betty and the Bobs
2007	My Favourite Shirt	Vinnick Sheppard Harte
2008	Happy Here	Solo
2008	Dancing Alone: Songs of William Hawkins: Frankly Stoned	Compilation
2009	That's The State I'm In	The Marigolds
2011	Me 'n Mabel	Solo
2012	Live at Bluesville	Solo
2018	Shake The Love Around	Solo
2022	Fall Back Home	Solo
2023	A'Court, Spiegel & Vinnick	A'Court, Spiegel & Vinnick
2026	Outside the Lines Guest vocalist	Ethan Askey & The Elevators

== Awards ==
Year	Nominee / work	Award	Result
2003	Best Female Vocalist	Maple Blues Awards	Won
2006	Best Bassist	Maple Blues Awards	Won
2006	Best Female Vocalist	Maple Blues Awards	Won
2006	Best Song Writer	Maple Blues Awards	Won
2008	Best Female Vocalist	Maple Blues Awards	Won
2009	Best Female Vocalist	Maple Blues Awards	Won
2009	Roots and Traditional Album of the Year: Happy Here	Juno Awards	Nominated
2010	Blues category	International Songwriting Competition	Won
2011	Best Female Vocalist	Maple Blues Awards	Won
2011	Contemporary Singer of the Year	Canadian Folk Music Awards	Won
2011	Best Song Writer	Maple Blues Awards	Won
2012	Blues Album of the Year Me 'n Mabel	Juno Awards	Nominated
2013	Best Female Vocalist	Maple Blues Awards	Won
2013	Best Acoustic Act	Maple Blues Awards	Won
2018	Producer of the Year: Shake the Love Around	Canadian Folk Music Awards	Nominated
2019	Special Recognition Award	Saskatchewan Jazz Festival	Won
2023	Best Female Vocalist	Maple Blues Awards	Won
2023	Best Acoustic Act	Maple Blues Awards	Won
2024	Contemporary Singer of the Year Fall Back Home	Canadian Folk Music Awards	Won
