= When We Were Kings (Scott Sorry album) =

Studio album by Scott Sorry
- Released: March 18, 2016
- Genre: Rock

When We Were Kings is the debut solo album by Scott Sorry released on March 18, 2016.

== Background ==
In February 2015, Sorry announced plans to release his first solo album, When We Were Kings, through a campaign on the Pledgemusic platform. Achieving 437% of its initial goal, the album was officially released on March 18, 2016, debuting on the Official UK Rock Charts at number two. Critical response was very positive with Vive Le Rock magazine awarding the album 9 out of 10 and Fireworks magazine commenting "Rock 'n' Roll has often become throwaway, safe and expected. No one told When We Were Kings, it's the very heart of what this type of music should be about."
