= Day to Day Dust =

Studio album by Murray McLauchlan
- Released: 1973
- Studio: Eastern Sound, Toronto, Ontario
- Genre: Folk
- Label: True North
- Producer: Bernie Finkelstein, Murray McLauchlan

Murray McLauchlan chronology
Murray McLauchlan (1972)	Day to Day Dust (1973)	Sweeping the Spotlight Away (1974)

Singles from Day to Day Dust
- 1. "Hurricane of Change" Released: June 1973; 2. "Linda, Won't You Take Me In" Released: 1974

Professional ratings
Review scores
Source	Rating
Allmusic	3/5 stars

Day to Day Dust is an album by Canadian singer-songwriter Murray McLauchlan, released in 1973.

== Track listing ==
All songs by Murray McLauchlan.

1. "Hurricane of Change" – 3:06
2. "Revelations" – 4:44
3. "Linda, Won't You Take Me In" – 2:57
4. "The Fool Who'd Watch You Go" – 4:53
5. "Two Bit Nobody" – 3:38
6. "Six For Five" – 3:41
7. "You Need a New Lover Now" – 3:39
8. "Golden Trumpet" – 4:40
9. "Paradise" – 5:38
10. "Midnight Break" – 5:11

== Personnel ==
- Murray McLauchlan – vocals, guitar, harmonica, keyboards
- Amos Garrett – guitar
- Chris Parker – drums
- Dennis Pendrith – bass
- Chris Skene – backing vocals
- Bernie Finkelstein – backing vocals

Technical

- Bill Seddon – mixing
- Bart Schoales – art direction, photography
