= Highball Roller =

Studio album by Sorry and the Sinatras
- Released: May 11, 2009
- Recorded: September 2008, Barnsley, United Kingdom
- Genre: Punk rock, hard rock
- Length: 39:56
- Producer: Jason Sanderson

Sorry and the Sinatras chronology
| Highball Roller (2009) | The Kings of Shambles Street E.P. (2012) |

Professional ratings
Review scores
| Source | Rating |
|---|---|
| The Skinny | 3/5 stars |
| Rock Sound | 8/10 stars |

Highball Roller is the debut album by punk rock group Sorry and the Sinatras on May 11, 2009 through UnderGroove Records. The group recorded the album in less than three weeks in Barnsley, United Kingdom with producer Jason Sanderson in September 2008

== Track listing ==
All lyrics and music by Sorry and the Sinatras

| No. | Title | Length |
|---|---|---|
| 1. | "Black 'N' Blue" | 3:57 |
| 2. | "Burns City Burns" | 1:23 |
| 3. | "Riverside" | 4:30 |
| 4. | "No Angels" | 2:36 |
| 5. | "Borrowed Time" | 3:14 |
| 6. | "Gimme More" | 2:14 |
| 7. | "Hated Heart" | 3:51 |
| 8. | "Junkie" | 3:15 |
| 9. | "Nose Don't Work" | 1:32 |
| 10. | "So Far From Home" | 4:41 |
| 11. | "Suicide Head" | 3:17 |
| 12. | "She's So Vaudeville" | 5:26 |

== Personnel ==
Sorry and the Sinatras

- Scott Sorry – vocals, rhythm guitar
- Dave Kerr – lead guitar, backing vocals
- Roger "Rags" Segal – bass, backing vocals
- Lenny Thomas – drums

Production personnel

- Jason Sanderson – production, mixing, mastering
