= Murray McLauchlan (album) =

Studio album by Murray McLauchlan
- Released: 1972
- Recorded: June–July 1972
- Studio: Record Plant, New York City
- Genre: Pop, rock
- Label: True North
- Producer: Ed Freeman

Murray McLauchlan chronology
Song from the Street (1971)	Murray McLauchlan (1972)	Day to Day Dust (1973)

Murray McLauchlan is a 1972 folk rock album by Canadian singer, songwriter, guitarist, pianist, broadcaster and actor, Murray McLauchlan.

Murray travelled to New York City to record this album, between June and July at The Record Plant. This is evident in his backing musicians which include a number of well known American musicians of the time including Tony Levin, Charlie Hayward of the Charlie Daniels Band and David Spinozza. He also enlisted record producer Ed Freeman who had produced Don McLean's best selling album American Pie the previous year.

The album is notable as well for containing the first known commercially released version of the Warren Zevon song "Carmelita", which was not released by Zevon himself until 1976, and was covered by Linda Ronstadt in 1977. McLauchlan performed a version of "Carmelita" on a 1989 TV show recorded at Toronto's Diamond Club featuring a vocal duet with Canadian alt-country singer Lori Yates.

== Track listing ==
All tracks composed by Murray McLauchlan; except where noted.

Side 1

1. "No Time Together Today" 3:32
2. "Lady Soul" 3:05
3. "I Wanna Watch You Move" 3:09
4. "Old Man's Song" 3:26
5. "Billy McDaniels" 2:47

Side 2

1. "Lose We" 2:25
2. "Quiet Places to Come Home To" 3:16
3. "Carmelita" (Warren Zevon) 4:08
4. "Big Bad City" 3:38
5. "The Farmer's Song" 3:05

== Personnel ==
- Murray McLauchlan – vocals, guitar, piano
- Charlie Hayward – bass
- Buzzy Feiten – lead guitar on "Lady Soul"
- Tony Levin – bass on "Big Bad City"
- David Spinozza – guitar on "Big Bad City"
- Neil Larsen – organ on "Lady Soul"
- Richard Killgore – drums
- Warren Bernhardt – keyboards
- Mike Mainieri – vibes
- Larry Kraman – synthesizer
- Paul Prestopino – dobro
- Eric Weissberg – mandolin
- Tom Flye and the West 44th Street Rhythm and Noise Choir – additional drums and percussion
- Raun MacKinnon, Mike Wendroff, Kathleen Whelen, Allan Jacobs, Jerry Burnham – backing vocals

Technical

- Dennis Ferrante, Jack Douglas, Roy Cicala, Tom Flye – engineer
