= Boulevard (Murray McLauchlan album) =

Studio album by Murray McLauchlan
- Released: 1976
- Recorded: January–February 1976
- Studio: Eastern Sound, Toronto, Ontario
- Genre: Pop, rock
- Length: 41:27
- Label: True North
- Producer: Murray McLauchlan

Murray McLauchlan chronology
Only the Silence Remains (1976)	Boulevard (1976)	Hard Rock Town (1977)

Professional ratings
Review scores
Source	Rating
Allmusic	3/5 stars

Boulevard is a 1976 album by Canadian singer-songwriter Murray McLauchlan.

== Track listing ==
All songs by Murray McLauchlan.

1. "Harder to Get Along" – 5:10
2. "Train Song" – 5:37
3. "Met You at the Bottom" – 5:03
4. "La Guerre, C'est Fini Pour Moi" – 5:16
5. "On The Boulevard" – 3:51
6. "As Lonely As You" – 3:28
7. "Crying to Me" – 4:15
8. "Slingback Shoes" – 3:47
9. "Gypsy Boy" – 5:00

== Personnel ==
- Murray McLauchlan - vocals, guitar, piano, harmonica

The Silver Tractors

- Gene Martynec - guitar
- Dennis Pendrith - bass, harmony vocals
- Ben Mink - mandolin, fiddle
- Ronney Abramson - vocals on "Crying to Me" and "Slingback Shoes"

Technical

- Ken Friesen - engineer
- Bart Schoales - art direction, photography
