= La Chicane =

Canadian francophone rock band

- Origin: Val-d'Or, Quebec, Canada
- Genres: Rock
- Years active: 1993–2006; 2008–present
- Members: 1993: Boom Desjardins, Alain Villeneuve, Suzanne Dufour, Christian Legault, Éric Lemieux 2000: Martin Bédard, Dany Bédard, Matt Laurent

La Chicane is a Canadian francophone rock band based in Val-d'Or, Quebec. Their sound is described as "jazz-rock" or "lounge rock".

== History ==
La Chicane was formed in 1993 in Val-d'Or, Quebec by Boom Desjardins, Alain Villeneuve, Suzanne Dufour, Christian Legault and Éric Lemieux. They performed regularly in Quebec and recorded for DKD Disques.

In 2000, La Chicane was nominated for best group and for best-selling Francophone album at the Juno Awards.

They performed at the 2003 Toronto Rocks SARS benefit concert, along with many more well-known bands.

In 2007, disagreement between Desjardins and Dany Bédar along with financial and other personal issues among the bandmembers led to the dissolution of the band. After meeting during the recording of an episode of the TV series Banquier, the two made up and reformed La Chicane. After a ten-year hiatus, La Chicane released a new song in 2017 called "La derniere Chicane".

In early 2020, the band announced the release of a new album titled Quand ça va bien. Songs on the album were written by Boom Desjardins, Éric Maheux and Dany Bédar. However, due to the COVID-19 pandemic, the planned release of the album in May was put on hold, along with the accompanying tour.

== Past and present members ==
- Dany Bédar, bassist (2001–2002, left for solo career)
- Martin Bédar, drummer and Dany Bedar's brother
- Daniel 'Boom' Desjardins, lead singer (founding–2004, left for solo career)
- Matt Laurent, guitarist and lead singer (2008)
- Christian Legault, guitarist (founding–present)
- Éric Lemieux, keyboardist (founding–present)
- Éric Maheu, bassist (2003–2004)
- Alain Villeneuve, guitarist (founding–2000)
- Suzanne Dufour backing vocals (founding–1999)

== Awards and recognition ==
- 2000: Juno Awards, winner for Best Selling Francophone Album (En Catimini), nominee for Best Group
- 2002: Juno Awards, nominee for Best Selling Francophone Album (Disparu)
- 2004: Juno Awards, nominee for Group of the Year

== Discography ==
- 1999: En Catimini
- 2000: Disparu
- 2003: Ent' nous autres
- 2006: La Chicane: 1998–2006 (Best Of)
- 2009: La Chicane
