= Carmelita (song) =

Song by Murray McLauchlan

from the album Murray McLauchlan
- Released: 1972
- Genre: Country rock
- Length: 4:08
- Songwriter: Warren Zevon

"Carmelita" is a country rock song written by Warren Zevon. The song was originally recorded in 1972 by Canadian singer Murray McLauchlan on his self-titled album. Zevon himself recorded it four years later, in 1976, on his self-titled album. Linda Ronstadt recorded a version in 1977 on her Simple Dreams album.

In 1986, country singer Dwight Yoakam sang this on his album, Guitars, Cadillacs, Etc., Etc. He reprised this in a collaboration with conjunto/Tex-Mex musician Flaco Jimenez on Jimenez' 1992 release, Partners LP.

"Carmelita" is referenced by The Killers and Dawes 2013 collaboration "Christmas in L.A." An animated depiction of Zevon also appears briefly in the song's accompanying music video.

Punk rock singer GG Allin recorded two different cover versions of the song, released on an EP also called Carmelita. A scene of Allin recording the song is featured in the documentary film Hated: GG Allin and the Murder Junkies.
