= Trashlight Vision =

American punk band

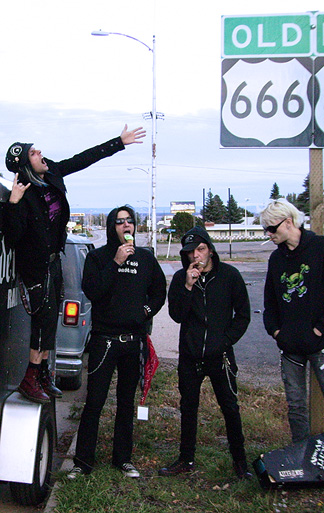
Acey Slade, Roger "Rags" Segal, Lenny Thomas, Steve "Strüe" Haley. Photo: Richie Riot

Trashlight Vision was a thrash punk band from the United States. They featured the guitarist from Murderdolls, Acey Slade and Steve Haley from the Philadelphia-based rock band HALEY.

The band released their debut album in April 2006 on UnderGroove Records in the UK, entitled "Alibis and Ammunition". The album features 11 original songs as well as a cover of the Ramones song "My Brain Is Hanging Upside Down (Bonzo Goes to Bitburg)".

After releasing "Alibis and Ammunition", Trashlight Vision gained a strong and increasingly big fanbase and toured many different countries including their home country, various parts of Europe, the United Kingdom and Japan.

Trashlight Vision signed with Rock Ridge Music in the USA and released Alibis and Ammunition in the United States on July 10, 2007.

The group disbanded on September 12, 2007.

On 18 August 2011, the band announced that they would reunite with the original line-up to play a single show in Philadelphia, Pennsylvania, on 29 September 2011. The show was set up as a benefit show for drummer Jonny Chops who underwent emergency surgery to remove a brain tumour in July 2011.

== Members ==
- Acey Slade – lead vocals, rhythm guitar (2004–2007, 2011)
- Steve Haley – lead guitar, backing vocals (2004–2007, 2011)
- Roger "Rags" Segal – bass, backing vocals (2004–2007, 2011) (died February 2022)
- Jonny Chops – drums (2007)
- Lenny Thomas – drums (2004–2007, 2011) (died October 2016)

== Post-Trashlight Vision ==
Acey Slade served a short stint playing guitar with Wednesday 13 in 2008, before producing 'It Starts Here', by Billy Liar. He is now the lead singer and guitarist in his band Acey Slade & The Dark Party and is also playing bass with Dope.

Steve Haley is now a solo artist.

Lenny Thomas played drums in Sorry and the Sinatras with The Wildhearts bassist Scott Sorry. He died on October 20, 2016.

Roger Segal also played bass in Sorry and the Sinatras but announced that he had retired from playing music in early 2010. He died in mid-February 2022.

Jonny Chops was briefly the touring drummer with AntiProduct and was playing drums with Wednesday 13 until the reformation of Murderdolls. In July 2011 he underwent emergency surgery to remove a brain tumour.

== Discography ==
- Trashlight Vision EP - (2004)
- 'Allergic To Home' EP - (2005)
- "Alibis and Ammunition" - (2006)
