= Scott Sorry =

American musician (1978–2025)

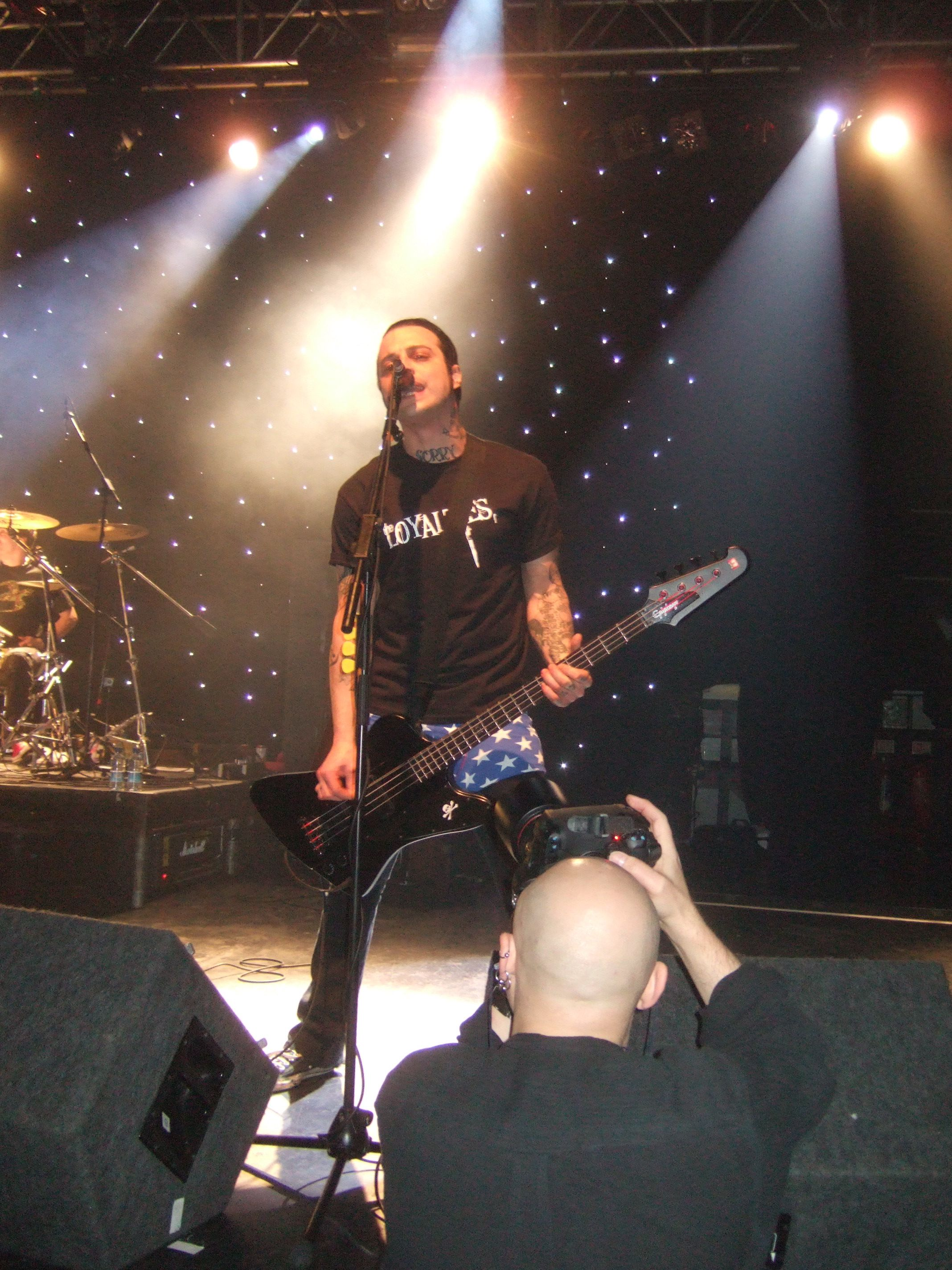
- Sorry performing in 2007

Background information
- Born: Gerard Scott; October 30, 1978
- Origin: Philadelphia, Pennsylvania, U.S.
- Died: October 30, 2025 (aged 47)
- Genres: Punk rock; hard rock
- Occupation: Musician; singer-songwriter
- Instruments: Bass; guitar; vocals
- Years active: 2003–2025
- Labels: Only One; Shrapnel; Round; UnderGroove; Backstage Alliance
- Formerly of: Amen; The Wildhearts; Sorry and the Sinatras; Brides of Destruction
- Website: scottsorry.com

Gerard Scott (October 30, 1978 – October 30, 2025), better known by his stage name Scott Sorry, was an American singer-songwriter. Prior to being a solo artist, Scott played with Amen, The Wildhearts, Sorry and the Sinatras, and briefly Brides of Destruction.

== Life and career ==
=== Amen (2003–2005) ===
After playing in a variety of punk bands in Philadelphia, Sorry joined US punk rockers Amen on their 2003 Join Or Die tour, playing with the band until late 2005 when he quit the group.

=== Brides of Destruction (2005) ===
Following the departure of founder Nikki Sixx, Sorry was announced as the new bassist for hard rock supergroup Brides of Destruction along with The Wildhearts singer, and future bandmate, Ginger who departed the group soon after they began writing new material. They released the album Runaway Brides, produced by Andy Johns, in Europe on September 13 and on September 27 in the US. A video was shot for "White Trash" but both the album and the single failed to chart. Prior to touring, Sorry was replaced by Tracii Guns' stepson Jeremy Guns on bass.

=== The Wildhearts (2006–2009, 2014) ===
In 2006, Sorry joined a new lineup of The Wildhearts, recording an album in January 2007, The Wildhearts. The album was released on April 23, preceded two weeks earlier by the download-only single "The Sweetest Song". On May 19, 2008, the Wildhearts released the all-covers album Stop Us If You've Heard This One Before, Vol 1.. Artists covered include Icicle Works, Fugazi, Helmet, The Distillers, Descendents, and The Georgia Satellites. The first version of the album was a download-only collection of 12 tracks. The band travelled to Denmark to record their ninth studio album, ¡Chutzpah!, which was released on August 31, 2009, followed by a tour of the United Kingdom in September and October. At these shows, the band played the new record in its entirety, followed by an encore of older songs.

The band won the award for Spirit of Independence at the 2009 Kerrang! Awards, as well as playing on the Bohemia stage during the first UK Sonisphere Festival. On November 25, 2009, The Wildhearts announced the release of ¡Chutzpah! Jnr., a mini album composed of tracks recorded during the ¡Chutzpah! sessions but either released as free tracks on their website, bonus tracks from the Japanese physical release, or unreleased tracks from the sessions.

Sorry never joined the Wildhearts for their 2012 reformation due to family commitments. He was replaced by Random Jon Poole, but re-joined the band early in 2014 for their UK tour.

=== Sorry and the Sinatras (2007–2013) ===
Sorry initially met Roger "Rags" Segal and Lenny Thomas in North Carolina while he was on tour with his previous band Brides of Destruction in 2005, while Segal and Thomas were both in Brides support act Trashlight Vision. Sorry started working on new material with Blackbelt guitarist Danny Sinatra when Trashlight Vision split up. Segal and Thomas then linked up with Sorry and Sinatra to form the new group, Sorry and the Sinatras. They announced in June their first dates in the UK, taking place in August at The Asylum in Birmingham and at the Bar Academy in London. The group entered the studio in September in Barnsley, South Yorkshire, England, with producer Jason Sanderson. The album was completed in less than three weeks. Highball Roller was released on May 11, 2009, which was generally well received by British music critics, with a tour of the UK planned but this was postponed until October with the band touring the East Coast of the United States in August.

=== Solo career (2015–2025) ===
In February 2015, Sorry announced plans to release his first solo album When We Were Kings through a campaign on the Pledgemusic platform. Achieving 437% of its initial goal, the album was officially released on March 18, 2016, debuting on the Official UK Rock Chart at Number 2. Vive Le Rock Magazine awarded the album 9 out of 10. On October 30, 2021, Scott released his first new single in six years. "Black Dog Dancers" was issued via Generation X-Ray Records.

== Personal life and death ==
Sorry was married to Hanni, and they had three children. He was diagnosed with glioblastoma, a form of brain cancer, in 2018. He died from the disease on his 47th birthday, October 30, 2025.

== Discography ==
=== With Amen ===
- Death Before Musick (2004)

=== With Brides of Destruction ===
- Runaway Brides (2005)

=== With The Wildhearts ===
- The Wildhearts (2007)
- Stop Us If You've Heard This One Before, Vol 1. (2008)
- ¡Chutzpah! (2009)
- ¡Chutzpah! Jnr. (2009)

=== With Sorry and the Sinatras ===
- Highball Roller (2009)
- Kings of Shambles Street (2012)

=== Solo work ===
- When We Were Kings (2016)
