= Dany Bédar =

Canadian singer, bassist (born 1976)

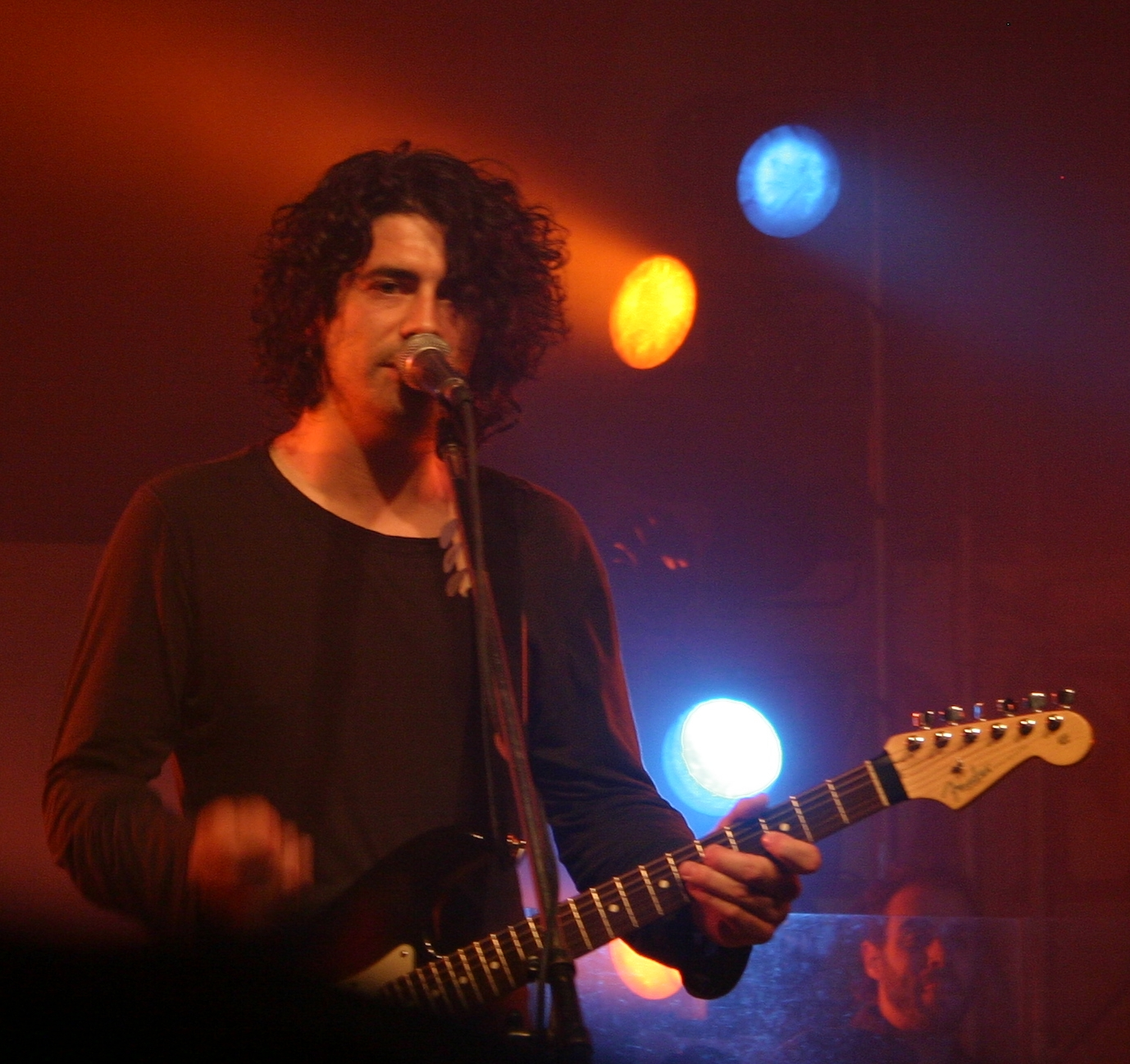

Background information
- Born: July 2, 1976 (age 50)
- Origin: Val-d'Or, Quebec, Canada
- Genres: Pop-rock
- Years active: 1993–present

Dany Bédar is a francophone Québécois singer from Val-d'Or in Abitibi-Témiscamingue, Quebec, Canada. At the age of 19, Bédar moved to Montreal, where he played bass guitar with the local band La Chicane from 1999 to 2007, quickly demonstrating his talents as a composer with "Tu m'manques," which earned three Félix Awards and one Juno Award.

Bédar was the bass player for the group Sex Solution, along with follower members, Richard Gibouleau (percussionist) and Karl Coderre (singer/guitarist). Bédar launched his solo career in 2002. He has also written for several artists, including La Chicane, Boom Desjardins, Marie-Chantal Toupin, Nolwenn Leroy, Annie Villeneuve, and Marc Dupré. He also had a bilingual (French/English) hit with Joel Kroeker entitled "Déjà Vu".

== Discography ==
- 2002: Fruit de ma récente nuit blanche
- 2004: Écoute-moi donc
- 2004: La Tournée Boombox (with Boom Desjardins and Richard Pelland)
- 2006: Acoustique... en studio !
- 2007: Y'a du monde DVD
- 2011: L'avocat du Yab
- 2012: On a tous une histoire a cont No. 40 CAN

== Awards and nominations ==
- 28th ADISQ awards, 2005 – Pop rock album of the year Écoute-moi donc
- 28th ADISQ awards, 2005 – Best male artist
- Juno Awards of 2005 – Best Selling Francophone Album (nominated) – Écoute-moi donc
- Felix Awards - to honor achievements in Quebec music in 2020
