= Quartette (band) =

Canadian country-folk group

- Origin: Toronto, Ontario, Canada
- Genre: Country/Folk
- Years active: 1993–present
- Label: Denon
- Members: Cindy Church; Caitlin Hanford; Gwen Swick; Sylvia Tyson
- Past members: Colleen Peterson
- Website: quartette.com

Quartette is a Canadian country-folk group consisting of Cindy Church, Caitlin Hanford, Gwen Swick, and Sylvia Tyson. Each of the four members also record as solo artists in addition to their work as a group.

== History ==
The group was originally formed in 1993 and included Tyson, Hanford, Church, and Colleen Peterson.

In 1994, Quartette released a self-titled album, and later that year won a Canadian Country Music Association award for best vocal collaboration.

In 1995 and 1996, they were nominated for Juno Awards in the category of best country group.

Peterson had toured and recorded with Quartette until early 1996, when she was diagnosed with cancer and was unable to perform with the band during her cancer treatment. She chose her friend and collaborator Gwen Swick to fill in for her, and later died in Toronto on October 9 that year. She is interred in Little Lake Cemetery in Peterborough, Ontario.

All four current members of the group are also solo performers who have toured throughout Canada, having performed on Adrienne Clarkson Presents and at the Vancouver Folk Music Festival.

Quartette's recordings and live performances have been reviewed favorably by The Globe and Mail, Chatelaine and Billboard.

At the end of 2016, Quartette continued to perform live, completing a month-long tour in December.

== Discography ==
=== Albums ===
| Year | Title | CAN Country |
|---|---|---|
| 1993 | Quartette | |
| 1995 | Work of the Heart | 19 |
| 1996 | It's Christmas | |
| 1998 | In the Beauty of the Day | |
| 2002 | I See a Star | |
| 2007 | Down at the Fair | |
| 2013 | Rocks and Roses | |
| 2013 | 20 Years of Quartette | |

=== Singles ===
| Year | Title | CAN Country | Album |
|---|---|---|---|
| 1994 | "Red Hot Blues" | 9 | Quartette |
| 1995 | "No Place Like Home" | 81 | Work of the Heart |
| 1999 | "I Don't Want to Cry" | 53 | In the Beauty of the Day |
