= Jonny Chops =

American drummer

- Birth name: Jonathan Henrich
- Born: February 12, 1986 (age 39); Darby, PA, U.S.
- Genres: Horror punk, heavy metal
- Instruments: Drums
- Years active: 1992–present
- Website: www.myspace.com/jonnychops

Jonathan Henrich, better known as Jonny Chops (born February 12, 1986), is a rock musician from Havertown, Pennsylvania. He is best known for his role as the former drummer of Wednesday 13. He has also played in several other bands, including Anti-Product, Trashlight Vision, and a few local bands including, Divided Sky and Copper Mine.
