= Song from the Street =

Studio album by Murray McLauchlan
- Released: October 1971
- Recorded: April 13 – May 4, 1971
- Studio: Thunder Sound, Toronto, Ontario; Eastern Sound, Toronto
- Label: True North
- Producer: Gene Martynec

Murray McLauchlan chronology
Song from the Street (1971)	Murray McLauchlan (1972)

Professional ratings
Review scores
Source	Rating
AllMusic	3/5 stars

Song from the Street is the debut album by Canadian singer-songwriter Murray McLauchlan, released in 1971. This album was the fourth release by fledgling Canadian label True North Records, and McLauchlan its second Singer-Songwriter artist joining Bruce Cockburn. (True North released a record by electronic group Syrinx before Song from the Street).

The album title is echoed in McLauchlan's compilation release thirty-six years later, which was titled Best of Murray McLauchlan: Songs from the Street.

== Track listing ==
All tracks composed by Murray McLauchlan

1. "I Just Get Older" – 2:47
2. "You Make My Loneliness Fly" – 4:06
3. "Sixteen Lanes of Highway" – 5:30
4. "Jesus Please Don't Save Me ('Til I Die)" – 3:18
5. "I Would Call You My Friend" – 3:32
6. "One Night By My Window" – 3:43
7. "Child's Song" – 6:24
8. "Back on the Street" – 3:11
9. "Honky Red" – 3:57
10. "Ranchero's Lament" – 2:44

== Personnel ==
- Murray McLauchlan – vocals, guitar, harmonica, slide guitar
- Barry Flast – piano
- Eugene Martynec – guitar, producer
- Dennis Pendrith – bass, backing vocals
- Eric Robertson – organ
- Jay Telfer – drums

Technical

- Henry Saskowski – engineer
- Bart Schoales – artwork, photography
