= ¡Chutzpah! =

Studio album by the Wildhearts

Studio album by the Wildhearts
- Released: 31 August 2009
- Recorded: April 2009
- Studios: Hansen (Ribe, Denmark)
- Genres: Hard rock; heavy metal; pop rock; punk rock
- Length: 36:34
- Label: Backstage Alliance
- Producer: Jacob Hansen

The Wildhearts chronology
Stop Us If You've Heard This One Before, Vol 1. (2008)	¡Chutzpah! (2009)	¡Chutzpah! Jnr. (2009)

Singles from ¡Chutzpah!
- 1. "The Only One" Released: 3 August 2009

¡Chutzpah! is the eighth studio album by British rock band the Wildhearts. Recorded at producer Jacob Hansen's studio in Ribe, Denmark, it was released on 31 August 2009 by Backstage Alliance. The album was the band's final studio release for ten years as well as the last to feature bassist Scott Sorry, who left in 2012. ¡Chutzpah! reached number 53 on the UK Albums Chart and was the band's first album since 1997's Endless, Nameless to top the UK Rock & Metal Albums Chart.

As with the band's 2007 self-titled album, ¡Chutzpah! was written collaboratively by all four members of the Wildhearts. The sole single from the regular edition of the album, "The Only One", features lead vocals by Sorry. A few months after the album's release, the band issued the EP ¡Chutzpah! Jnr., which features the four bonus tracks from the Japanese edition of ¡Chutzpah!, alongside the single "The Snake, the Lion, the Monkey and the Spider" and three previously unreleased songs.

== Writing and recording ==
After releasing the covers album Stop Us If You've Heard This One Before, Vol 1. in May 2008, the Wildhearts began writing and rehearsing material for an eighth studio album before the end of the year. In February 2009, the band recorded demo versions of several new songs at Seawolf Studios in Helsinki, Finland with their manager and engineer Virpi Immonen. The recordings from these sessions were later remastered by Dave Draper and released under the title The Virpi Demos as part of the 10th anniversary reissue of ¡Chutzpah!. Recording for the album proper took place in April at Hansen Studios in Ribe, Denmark with producer Jacob Hansen.

Like on 2007's The Wildhearts, the tracks on ¡Chutzpah! were co-written by all four members of the band: Ginger Wildheart, CJ Wildheart, Scott Sorry and Ritch Battersby. In an interview with the website Room Thirteen, Ginger revealed that this was a conscious choice: "It was a band decision to try to take the group to another level. We decided that making decisions should be a democratic process. For far too long I've been making the decisions myself." As part of this new way of working, the band decided "to make something more commercial than usual"; Ginger claimed that he "wanted to make something far less commercial" but was "happy to have been shot down on that idea". It also led to the other band members performing vocals, as they had done for the first time on Stop Us If You've Heard This One Before, Vol 1.

== Promotion and release ==
Ahead of the album's release, the Wildhearts released "The Only One" as the sole single on digital download from ¡Chutzpah! on 3 August 2009. The song features lead vocals from Sorry, rather than Ginger. A couple of weeks later, non-album track "The Snake, the Lion, the Monkey and the Spider" was also released online. Following the release of ¡Chutzpah! on 31 August, the band embarked on a UK tour between mid-September and early October. More shows in the UK and Europe were added in December. In October, Japanese bonus track "Zeen Requiem" was released as a free download.

During the December tour, the Wildhearts released the mini-album ¡Chutzpah! Jnr., which was initially made available only to attendees at select shows. The next month, the collection – consisting of the Japanese bonus tracks, "The Snake, the Lion, the Monkey and the Spider" and three previously unreleased songs – was released on the band's official online store. In 2019, the Wildhearts released an expanded version of ¡Chutzpah! remastered by Dave Draper, featuring all 18 tracks of each release, alongside bonus discs containing the Seawolf demos and rehearsal recordings.

== Reception ==
=== Commercial ===
¡Chutzpah! debuted at number 53 on the UK Albums Chart. It was the band's first release since Endless, Nameless in 1997 to top the UK Rock & Metal Albums Chart, as well as reaching number 7 on the UK Independent Albums, number 52 on the UK Album Downloads Chart, number 62 on the UK Physical Albums Chart, and number 65 on the Scottish Albums Chart.

=== Critical ===
Professional ratings
Review scores
Source	Rating
AllMusic	3.5/5 stars
Kerrang!	5/5
Record Collector	4/5 stars
Rock Sound	8/10
Spin	favourable

Critical response to ¡Chutzpah! was widely positive. Kerrang! gave the album a full rating of five out of five, with reviewer Steve Beebee writing: "Chutzpah! is an album that holds together rather better than any of the Wildhearts' recent work – it sounds like the band have hit on a pristine, expansive sound, and from within that huge canyon the songs have been set free to take flight." Reviewing the album for Rock Sound magazine, Darren Sadler gave Chutzpah! an 8/10 rating, writing that "while it isn't the most instant of albums, it's frankly quirky nature makes it all the more excitable", concluding that the album is a "job well and truly done".

Record Collector reviewer Ben Hopkins praised ¡Chutzpah! for featuring "some of the band's best material in years", a description for which he highlighted songs such as "The Jackson Whites" and "You Are Proof That Not All Women Are Insane". However, he did suggest that "Not everything here is as fulfilling", describing "The Only One" as "too nice for a band who once sang, 'Baby can't you see I'm shitting brown water?'", and criticising the chorus on "John of Violence" as "so routine that even Feeder would've reconsidered". Eduardio Rivadavia of AllMusic hailed ¡Chutzpah! as "an increasingly confident return to the band's metallic-sized power pop roots", highlighting "The Only One", "You Are Proof That Not All Women Are Insane", "You Took the Sunshine from New York" and "Mazel Tov Cocktail" (which he described as "a potential all-time classic") in particular. Brian Raftery of Spin magazine praised the album for its "stylistic overhauls" from the band's previous works.

In 2009, Kerrang! included ¡Chutzpah! at number 34 on its list of the 50 best albums of 2009, with writer Sam Law claiming that "you could always expect the unexpected from the irrepressible Geordie rockers [...] From slamming opener 'The Jackson Whites' to the cheekily effervescent pop-rock of 'You Are Proof That Not All Women Are Insane', of course, this was still giddily amusing stuff."

== Track listings ==
=== Original version ===
All tracks are written by The Wildhearts, except "People Who Died" by Jim Carroll.

No.	Title	Length
1.	"The Jackson Whites"	3:26
2.	"Plastic Jebus"	3:16
3.	"The Only One"	3:49
4.	"John of Violence"	3:51
5.	"You Are Proof That Not All Women Are Insane"	2:49
6.	"Tim Smith"	3:28
7.	"Low Energy Vortex"	3:28
8.	"You Took the Sunshine from New York"	3:39
9.	"Mazel Tov Cocktail"	2:58
10.	"Chutzpah"	5:46
Total length:		36:34

Japanese version
No.	Title	Length
1.	"Chutzpah Jnr."	0:58
2.	"The Jackson Whites"	3:26
3.	"Plastic Jebus"	3:16
4.	"The Only One"	3:49
5.	"John of Violence"	3:51
6.	"You Are Proof That Not All Women Are Insane"	2:49
7.	"Tim Smith"	3:28
8.	"Low Energy Vortex"	3:28
9.	"You Took the Sunshine from New York"	3:39
10.	"Zeen Requiem"	3:15
11.	"All That Zen"	3:41
12.	"People Who Died" (Jim Carroll Band cover)	3:31
13.	"Mazel Tov Cocktail"	2:58
14.	"Chutzpah"	5:46
Total length:		47:59

=== Remastered version ===
All tracks are written by The Wildhearts, except "People Who Died" by Jim Carroll.

2019 remastered version, disc one: ¡Chutzpah!
No.	Title	Length
1.	"¡Chutzpah! Jnr"	0:55
2.	"The Jackson Whites"	3:25
3.	"You Are Proof That Not All Women Are Insane"	2:49
4.	"The Only One"	3:47
5.	"The Snake, the Lion, the Monkey and the Spider"	3:40
6.	"Plastic Jebus"	3:14
7.	"Mazel Tov Cocktail"	2:57
8.	"John of Violence"	3:49
9.	"All That Zen"	3:42
10.	"You Took the Sunshine from New York"	3:39
11.	"Vernix"	3:28
12.	"Tim Smith"	3:27
13.	"Under the Waves"	3:36
14.	"Some Days Just Fucking Suck"	3:30
15.	"Zeen Requiem"	3:15
16.	"Low Energy Vortex"	3:27
17.	"People Who Died" (Jim Carroll Band cover)	3:30
18.	"¡Chutzpah!"	5:47
Total length:		60:55

2019 remastered version, disc two: The Virpi Demos
No.	Title	Length
1.	"¡Chutzpah! 1" (aka "¡Chutzpah! Jnr.")	0:50
2.	"The Jackson Whites"	3:25
3.	"Paper Weights" (aka "Plastic Jebus")	3:17
4.	"You Are Proof That Not All Women Are Insane"	2:46
5.	"The Greatest Man That Ever Walked on the Earth" (aka "Tim Smith")	3:25
6.	"Temptation Ranch" (aka "Low Energy Vortex")	3:20
7.	"New York Sunshine" (aka "You Took the Sunshine from New York")	3:29
8.	"Zeen Requiem"	3:11
9.	"All That Zen"	3:36
10.	"Monkey" (aka "The Snake, the Lion, the Monkey and the Spider")	3:32
11.	"Suicide" (aka "Some Days Just Fucking Suck")	3:28
12.	"Vernix"	3:33
13.	"¡Chutzpah! 2" (aka "¡Chutzpah!")	5:31
Total length:		40:23

2019 remastered version, disc three: The Rehearsal Demos
No.	Title	Length
1.	"John of Violence"	3:33
2.	"All That Zen"	6:14
3.	"The Greatest Man That Ever Walked on the Earth" (aka "Tim Smith")	3:26
4.	"Temptation Ranch" (aka "Low Energy Vortex")	3:23
5.	"New York Sunshine" (aka "You Took the Sunshine from New York")	4:00
6.	"Vernix"	3:31
7.	"Suicide" (aka "Some Days Just Fucking Suck")	3:29
8.	"Monkey" (aka "The Snake, the Lion, the Monkey and the Spider")	3:43
9.	"¡Chutzpah! 2" (aka "¡Chutzpah!")	5:34
10.	"You Took the Sunshine from New York" (band version)	3:25
Total length:		40:18

== Personnel ==
The Wildhearts

- Ginger – lead vocals, guitar
- CJ – guitar, backing vocals
- Scott – bass, backing vocals, lead vocals on "The Only One"
- Ritch – drums

Additional personnel

- Kim Olesen – keyboards, programming
- Jacob Hansen – production, engineering, mixing, mastering
- Jeppe Andersson – engineering assistance
- Martin Wolf Pagaard – engineering assistance
- Virpi Immonen – engineering on The Virpi Demos
- Dave Draper – remastering on the 2019 reissue
- Rich Jones – artwork

== Charts ==
Chart performance for ¡Chutzpah!
Chart (2009)	Peak position
Scottish Albums (OCC)	65
UK Albums (OCC)	53
UK Album Downloads (OCC)	52
UK Independent Albums (OCC)	7
UK Physical Albums (OCC)	62
UK Rock & Metal Albums (OCC)	1

== ¡Chutzpah! Jnr. ==
¡Chutzpah! Jnr.

EP by the Wildhearts
- Released: 2 December 2009
- Recorded: April 2009
- Studios: Hansen (Ribe, Denmark)
- Genres: Hard rock; heavy metal; pop rock; punk rock
- Length: 25:36
- Label: Backstage Alliance
- Producer: Jacob Hansen

The Wildhearts chronology
¡Chutzpah! (2009)	¡Chutzpah! Jnr. (2009)	Rock City vs the Wildhearts (2014)

Singles from ¡Chutzpah! Jnr.
- 1. "The Snake, the Lion, the Monkey and the Spider" Released: 15 August 2009; 2. "Zeen Requiem" Released: 16 October 2009

¡Chutzpah! Jnr. is an extended play (EP) by British rock band the Wildhearts. Released on 2 December 2009 by Backstage Alliance, the album features extra recordings from the sessions for the band's 2009 eighth studio album ¡Chutzpah!, recorded in April 2009 at Hansen Studios in Ribe, Denmark with producer Jacob Hansen. After originally being made available only to attendees on a European tour, ¡Chutzpah! Jnr. was released online in January 2010. All eight tracks were later featured as part of the 2019 remastered version of ¡Chutzpah!, which also included two discs of rehearsals from prior to the album's recording.

Track listing

All tracks are written by The Wildhearts, except "People Who Died" by Jim Carroll.

No.	Title	Length
1.	"Chutzpah Jnr."	0:55
2.	"The Snake, the Lion, the Monkey and the Spider"	3:40
3.	"All That Zen"	3:42
4.	"Vernix"	3:28
5.	"Under the Waves"	3:36
6.	"Some Days Just Fucking Suck"	3:30
7.	"People Who Died" (Jim Carroll Band cover)	3:30
8.	"Zeen Requiem"	3:15
Total length:		25:36
