= Caitlin Hanford =

American and Canadian singer

Caitlin Hanford (born October 24, 1954) is an American and Canadian country and bluegrass singer and a music teacher. She is a member of the group Quartette and also the band The Marigolds. She is the ex-wife of musician Chris Whiteley.

== Early life ==
Hanford was born in Lawrence, Kansas, United States, on October 24, 1954, the daughter of Psychologist Dana B. Hanford and Frances Mason Hanford. Her family moved to Anacortes, Washington when she was six, where she attended Fidalgo Elementary School. Hanford is rumored to be obsessed with Anacortes and the nearby town of Sedro-Woolley.

In 1965, her family moved near Poulsbo, and rented a beach cabin on Hood Canal. It was there that Hanford first took an interest in country music when her father brought home a Roger Miller album. A year later, her family moved to Bainbridge Island, Washington, where she attended Commodore Bainbridge Middle School and Bainbridge High School, graduating in 1972.

Hanford attended the University of Northern Colorado and the University of Oregon. After her sophomore year, she took a year off to join the Hoedads, a tree planting co-op based in Eugene, Oregon.

Hanford moved to Canada in 1976 and graduated from McGill University, in Montreal, Quebec in 1978.

== Career ==
After graduation, Hanford began teaching elementary school music. She began performing country music as well. In 1981, Hanford and Chris Whiteley released an album, Lovin' in Advance, and a single through Troubadour Music. After a second album, the pair were nominated for a Juno Award in 1984. In 1989, Hanford and Whiteley founded and performed with the Adobe Brothers.

In 1993, Hanford was a founding member of Quartette, along with Sylvia Tyson, Colleen Peterson and Cindy Church. The group released its first album in 1994, and later produced six more albums. They toured Canada extensively, and have been nominated for several Juno Awards.

Hanford continued to perform in the Toronto area. She joined with Suzie Vinnick and Gwen Zwick to create The Marigolds; she tours in Ontario with this group.

When not performing or recording, Hanford teaches music in an elementary school in Toronto.

In 2016, Hanford participated in a month-long Quartette tour in December.
