= The Works (The Wildhearts album) =

Compilation album by The Wildhearts
- Released: 31 March 2008
- Genres: hard rock, punk rock, heavy metal
- Label: Rhino Records

The Wildhearts chronology
The Wildhearts (2007)	The Works (2008)	Stop Us If You've Heard This One Before, Vol 1. (2008)

The Works is a compilation album by The Wildhearts, released on Rhino Records in March 2008. It is a comprehensive selection of the band's work from 1992–1996, including album tracks and EP tracks, as well as several B-sides that had been unavailable for over a decade. According to the band's website, this release is "licensed, but unofficial."

== Track listing ==
Disc 1

1. "Turning American" (Terry Date mix)
2. "Liberty Cap" (TD mix)
3. "Nothing Ever Changes But the Shoes" (TD mix)
4. "Crying over Nothing" (TD mix)
5. "Splattermania"
6. "Dreaming in A"
7. "Weekend (Five Long Days)"
8. "Greetings from Shitsville"
9. "TV Tan"
10. "Everlone"
11. "Loveshit"
12. "Miles Away Girl"
13. "My Baby Is a Headfuck"
14. "News of the World"
15. "Love You Till I Don't"

Disc: 2

1. "Dangerlust"
2. "Show a Little Emotion"
3. "Caffeine Bomb"
4. "Girlfriend Clothes"
5. "And the Bullshit Goes On"
6. "Suckerpunch"
7. "29 x the Pain" (original version)
8. "Beautiful Thing You"
9. "If Life Is Like a Love Bank I Want an Overdraft"
10. "Geordie in Wonderland"
11. "Do the Channel Bop"
12. "I Wanna Go Where the People Go" (single version)
13. "Can't Do Right for Doing Wrong"
14. "V-Day"
15. "Just in Lust"

Disc 3

1. "Nita Nitro"
2. "Jonesing for Jones"
3. "Naivety Play"
4. "In Lilly's Garden"
5. "Getting It"
6. "Mindslide"
7. "Friend for Five Minutes"
8. "Sick of Drugs"
9. "Bad Time to Be Having a Bad Time"
10. "Underkill"
11. "Red Light Green Light"
12. "The British All American Home Boy Crowd"
13. "Schizophonic"
14. "Sky Babies"
15. "Nite Songs"
