= Lunch At Allen's =

Canadian folk music group

- Origin: Toronto, Ontario, Canada
- Years active: 2004–present
- Members: Cindy Church; Marc Jordan; Murray McLauchlan; Ian Thomas

Lunch At Allen's is a band consisting of four Canadian artists of folk, country, and popular music, Cindy Church, Marc Jordan, Murray McLauchlan and Ian Thomas. Their name comes from the fact that three of the four members, Jordan, McLauchlan, and Thomas, would often meet for lunch at Allen's restaurant on Danforth Avenue in Toronto, Ontario.

== History ==
The band was formed in 2004 initially for a one-off, eight-city tour, but they have continued to write and perform since. McLauchlan, who had not played professionally in a while at the time of the band's formation, formed the band after being diagnosed with a heart issue requiring quadruple-bypass heart surgery. That year the group released a self-titled album. Catch the Moon followed in 2007, and More Lunch at Allen's in 2010. In 2012 they released a CD of holiday songs, Zuzu's Petals.

Lunch at Allen's went on tour in western Canada in 2016 and 2017. The group's album If It Feels Right was released in June, 2017.

== Members ==
- Cindy Church (Guitar & Vocals)
- Marc Jordan (Guitar, Piano & Vocals)
- Murray McLauchlan (Guitar, Piano, Harmonica & Vocals)
- Ian Thomas (Guitar, Mandolin & Vocals)

== Discography ==
=== Albums (CD and downloads) ===
- 2004 - Lunch At Allen's (EMI Canada)
- 2007 - Catch The Moon (EMI Canada)
- 2010 - More Lunch at Allen's (Linus Entertainment, Canada)
- 2012 - Zuzu's Petals: A Lunch At Allen's Christmas (Linus Entertainment, Canada)
- 2017 - If It Feels Right (Linus Entertainment, Canada)

=== Singles ===
- 2004 - Perfect World (EMI Canada)
- 2007 - What Kind of Love (EMI Canada)

=== DVD ===
- 2003 - Lunch At Allen's (EMI Canada)
