= Joel Kroeker =

Canadian singer, ethnomusicologist

- Born: Joel Kroeker
- Origin: Winnipeg, Manitoba, Canada
- Genre: Pop
- Occupations: Singer, songwriter, musician
- Instruments: Vocals, guitar, piano, saxophone, bass
- Years active: 1999–present
- Label: True North Records
- Website: www.joelkroeker.com

Joel Kroeker is a Canadian singer/songwriter. During his musical career, he was signed to the True North Records music label. Kroeker is also a specialized ethnomusicologist and a registered clinical counsellor, an accredited music therapist and a Zürich-trained Jungian analyst. He is of Mennonite heritage. He has released two official albums Melodrama (2004) and Closer to the Flame (2007) in addition to an earlier independent album release called Naive Bohemian (1999).

== Musical career ==
He graduated with a Bachelor of Music in Composition and Guitar Performance at the University of Manitoba and got a master's degree in music from the University of Alberta in Edmonton and is a multi-instrumentalist playing guitar, bass, piano saxophone and an expert on ethnic musical instruments as well as a registered clinical counsellor and music therapist and instructor of music and drama. In 2010 and 2011, he was also part of a jazz formation called Jazz Council.

Solo

His debut CD Naive Bohemian was an independent release in 1999 with some success on Canadian campus radio.

His first studio release was the album, Melodrama followed by Closer to the Flame. He had great success in Quebec as well with his single co-written with Dany Bédar called "Déjà Vu". His most successful single to date is his song "Goodbye Jane". Kroeker has played in Randy Bachman's album "Jazz Thing".

In Jazz Council

In 2010, Kroeker became part of the jazz band Jazz Council made up of Bernie Primbs (saxophone), Laurel Ralston (trumpet and flute), Sven Heyde (percussions) Tim Plait (piano) and Joel Kroeker (bass). The band had a successful debut album Dawn released in September 2011. BC Musician called the album "readily accessible and played with great energy and a high level of proficiency"

Others

After Kroeker left Jazz Council in 2011, he took up a teaching position teaching music and drama in Sparwood, British Columbia.

Kroeker now works as a registered clinical counsellor and music therapist based in Victoria, British Columbia, conducting individual counselling/therapy sessions, music therapy, educational workshops and seminars. Kroeker is a founder and workshop facilitator of "Archetypal Music Psychotherapy" and its "Creativity Workshops".

== In popular culture ==
The 2004 Canadian film Ham & Cheese directed by Warren P. Sonoda uses one of Kroeker's singles entitled "The Wind".

== Discography ==
=== Albums ===
Solo

- 1999: Naive Bohemian (independent CD)

1. "Dreams (of Romeo and Juliet)" (4:06) – 2. "Angry Young Ballerina" (2:33) – 3. "New Order" (2:33) – 4. "Inner Child" (3:34) – 5. "The Village" (5:03) – 6. "Low-fi Archive No. 1 (strings)" (1:44) – 7. "Freak Bus" (4:35) – 8. "The Bully" (3:50) – 9. "Low-fi Archive No. 2 (muzak)" (1:31) – 10. "Gratitude" (4:52) – 11. "Academic Superhero" (4:12) – 12. "Not Like Me" (3:38) – 13. "Low-fi Archive No. 3 (vignette)" (2:22) – 14. "Leaving Home" (5:44)

- 2004: Melodrama
- 2007: Closer to the Flame

as part of Jazz Council

- 2011: Dawn

=== Singles / Videos ===
- Goodbye Jane
- The Wind
- Déjé Vu (with Dany Bédar)
- Against Myself

== Awards ==
- 1999: Won Best New Recording Artist by the Alberta Recording Industry Association (ARIA)
- 1999: Won Film Score of the Year by the Alberta Recording Industry Association (ARIA) for the documentary "Tokyo Gardens"
- 2000: Nominated for SOCAN's Outstanding Songwriter of the Year Award
- 2004: Nominated for both Outstanding Pop Album of the Year and Best Songwriter of the Year at the Western Canadian Music Awards.
- 2007: Won Outstanding Pop Album of the Year for Closer to the Flame at the Western Canadian Music Awards
