= Down by the Henry Moore =

Single by Murray McLauchlan

from the album Sweeping the Spotlight Away
- Released: 1975
- Genre: Country, pop
- Length: 4:36
- Label: True North
- Songwriter: Murray McLauchlan
- Producers: Bernie Finkelstein; Murray McLauchlan

Murray McLauchlan singles chronology
"Maybe Tonight" (1975)	"Down by the Henry Moore" (1975)	"Little Dreamer" (1975)

"Down by the Henry Moore" is a single by Canadian artist Murray McLauchlan. Released in 1975, it was the fourth single from his album Sweeping the Spotlight Away. The song reached number one on the RPM Country Tracks chart in Canada in August 1975.

The song references several Toronto landmarks, including Kensington Market, The Silver Dollar Room, and Nathan Phillips Square, as well as the Henry Moore sculpture that is placed nearby.

== Chart performance ==
Chart (1975)	Peak position
Canadian RPM Country Tracks	1
Canadian RPM Adult Contemporary	1
Canadian RPM Top Singles	12
