= Boom Desjardins =

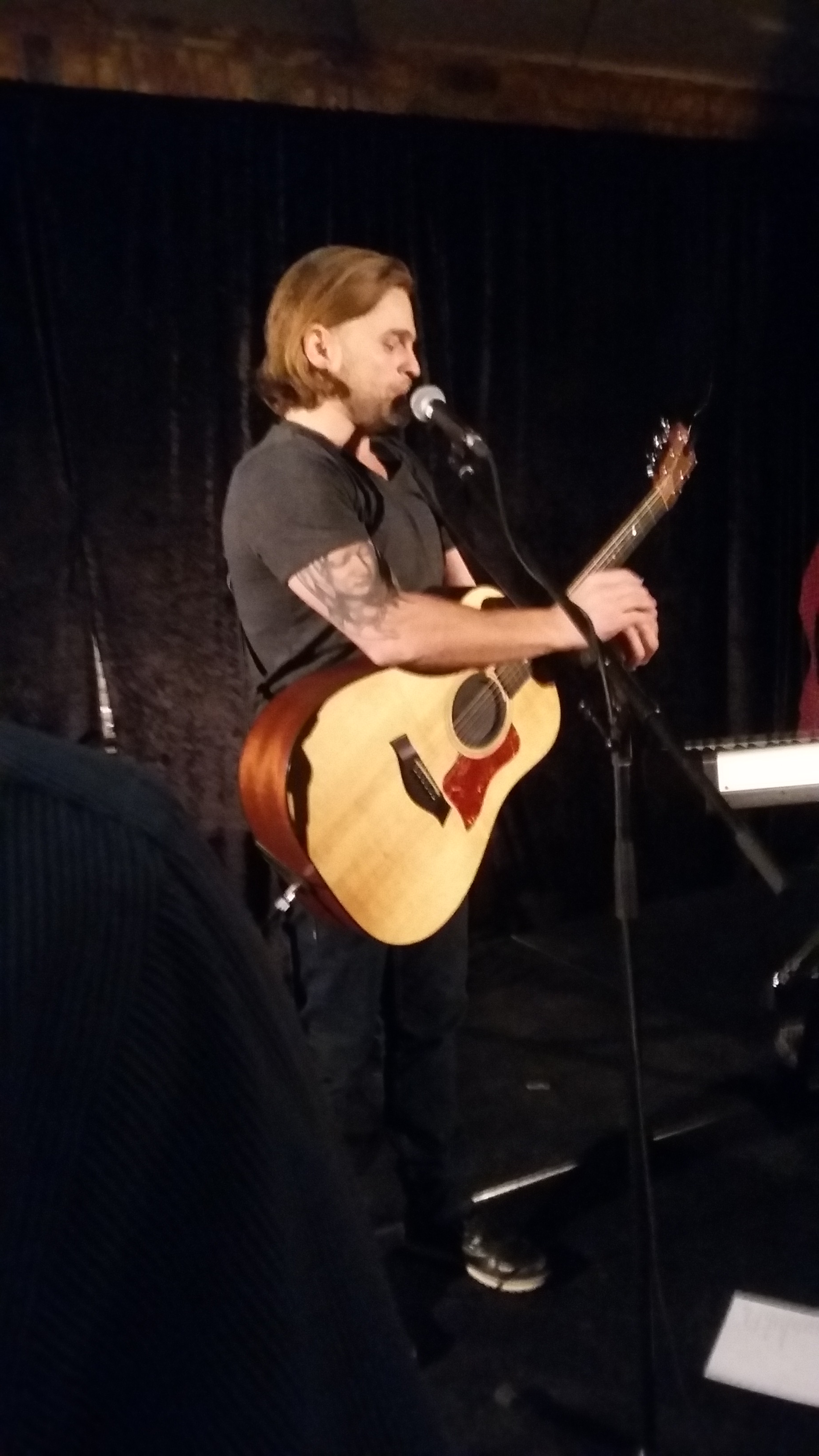

Background information
- Born: Daniel Desjardins; 1971 (age 54–55); Val-d'Or, Quebec
- Genre: Rock
- Years active: 1993–present
- Label: Entourage Musique
- Formerly of: La Chicane
- Website: boomdesjardins.com

Daniel "Boom" Desjardins (born 1971) is a French Canadian singer from Val-d'Or, Quebec. He was an original member of the rock band La Chicane for eleven years, from 1993 until 2004, when he left to begin a solo career.

Desjardins was nominated for Artist of the Year and Pop Album of the Year at the Juno Awards of 2006.

== Personal life ==
Desjardins has been known by the nickname "Boom" for most of his life. As an infant, he learned to walk at an early age and was a boisterous child; his family noted the similarity to the character of Bamm-Bamm (in Quebec French, "Boum-Boum") from the popular television show The Flintstones, and began calling him "Boom" as a result. According to Desjardins, everyone called him Boom, including his family, teachers, and school principal, and he has stated "my name is not Daniel, Daniel is someone else... my name is Boom."

== Discography ==
List of albums, with selected chart positions
Title	Album details	Peak chart positions	Certifications
Title	Album details	CAN	Certifications
Boom Desjardins	Released: November 2004	3	CRIA: Gold
Au nom de la musique	Released: November 7, 2006; Format: CD and DVD	—	
On se ressemble tant	Released: March 25, 2008; Label: Entourage Musique	7	
Rock le Québec	With Eric Maheu and Steve Hill; Released: October 6, 2009; Label: Entourage Musique	8	
Avec le temps	Released: April 26, 2011; Label: Entourage Musique	12	
Clandestin	Released: May 6, 2016; Label: Étiquette B	48	
"—" denotes a recording that did not chart or was not released in that territory.
