= Gwen Swick =

Canadian singer-songwriter

Gwen Swick is a Canadian singer-songwriter from Elora, Ontario. Although she has recorded and performed as a solo artist, she has been best known as a member of folk music groups such as Tamarack, The Three Marias, Quartette, and The Marigolds.

Born in Winnipeg, Manitoba, she grew up in a variety of Canadian cities as her father was a member of the Canadian Armed Forces. After studying music at York University, she began performing as a singer-songwriter in the mid-1980s. She recorded demos with Eddie Schwartz for a planned debut album in this era, but paused her career for a few years after giving birth to her daughter Anna with husband Randall Coryell.

She joined Tamarack in 1991, and performed with Cherie Camp and Shirley Eikhard in The Three Marias during the same era. She released her self-titled debut album in 1993, and followed up in 1995 with A Pebble of Mercy.

She joined Quartette in 1996 following the death of Colleen Peterson.

In 2002, she released her third solo album, Love and Gold. In the 2000s, she also performed with Caitlin Hanford and Suzie Vinnick as The Marigolds.

Her songs have also appeared in film soundtracks, including Never Talk to Strangers, Heater, and Sleeping Dogs.
