= Cindy Church =

Canadian musician

- Born: 1958 (age 67–68)
- Origin: Bible Hill, Nova Scotia, Canada
- Genres: Country, folk
- Occupation: Singer-songwriter
- Instruments: Vocals, guitar
- Years active: 1987–present
- Label: Stony Plain
- Website: cindychurch.com

Cindy Church (born 1958) is a Canadian country and folk artist. Church released three studio albums on Stony Plain Records and was nominated for Best Country Female Vocalist at the Juno Awards in 1995 and 1996. She is also a member of the award-winning group Quartette.

== Early life ==
Church grew up in Bible Hill, Nova Scotia.

== Biography ==
In 1984, Cindy Church, along with guitarist Nathan Tinkham, joined Ian Tyson's band, the Chinook Arch Riders. Church sang background vocals on three of Tyson's albums. In 1987, Church and Tinkham joined the traditional country music trio Great Western Orchestra founded by Neil Bentley, Dave Hamilton and mandolinist David Wilkie. The group recorded an album for Sony Music Canada and received a 1990 Juno Award nomination for Best Country Group or Duo. Church launched a solo career in 1992 with the release of the single "The Road to Home." Her second single, "A Song for Brent," was recorded in honour of Brent Berezay, who became a paraplegic following a rodeo accident. Proceeds from the song went to the Song for Brent Society.

Church won Female Artist of the Year at the 1993 Alberta Country Music Awards. That same year, she joined singer-songwriters Sylvia Tyson, Caitlin Hanford and Colleen Peterson to form the country and folk music group Quartette.

Church was named best country artist at the Alberta Recording Industry Awards in 1994; that year Quartette won the Canadian Country Music Association's award for Vocal Collaboration of the Year. The group received three consecutive Juno Award nominations for Best Country Group or Duo from 1995 to 1997. Peterson was forced to leave the group when she was diagnosed with cancer in 1996. She chose her friend Gwen Swick to fill in for her.

Church issued her debut solo album, Love on the Range, in 1994. Included was the Top 20 single "Rockabilly Heart." She received a nomination from the Canadian Country Music Association for Female Artist of the Year, and was also nominated for Best Country Female Vocalist at the Juno Awards in 1995 and 1996. Her second studio album, Just a Little Rain, was released in 1995.

Church's eponymous third album was released in 1996. The album featured a duet with Ian Tyson on a song written by Tyson, "What Does She See." The collaboration resulted in a 1998 Juno Award nomination for Best Country Group or Duo. Church continues to perform as a member of Quartette, who issued their sixth studio album, Down at the Fair, in 2007. She is also a member of the group Lunch At Allen's and performs in a tribute to Hoagy Carmichael, "The Nearness of You."

During the summer of 2016, Church was performing with singers Marc Jordan, Murray McLauchlan and Ian Thomas in the group Lunch At Allen's, in a number of towns and small cities in Ontario, Canada. She also continued her participation in Quartette with a month-long December tour.

== Discography ==
=== Albums ===
| Year | Title |
|---|---|
| 1994 | Love on the Range |
| 1995 | Just a Little Rain |
| 1996 | Cindy Church |
| 2012 | Sad Songs Make Me Happy |

=== Singles ===
| Year | Single | CAN Country | Album |
|---|---|---|---|
| 1992 | "The Road to Home" | — | Love on the Range |
| 1993 | "A Song for Brent" | 19 | Non-album song |
| 1994 | "Rockabilly Heart" | 19 | Love on the Range |
| 1994 | "Love on the Range" | 43 | Love on the Range |
| 1994 | "This October Day" | 32 | Love on the Range |
| 1995 | "My Wishing Room" | — | Love on the Range |
| 1995 | "Still a Fool" | 40 | Just a Little Rain |
| 1995 | "Trying to Rope the Wind" | 50 | Just a Little Rain |
| 1996 | "Never Got Over You" | 60 | Just a Little Rain |
| 1996 | "Sleeping Alone" | 68 | Just a Little Rain |
| 1996 | "Sweet Dreams of You" | 72 | Cindy Church |
| 1997 | "My Baby" | 54 | Cindy Church |
| 1997 | "Lover Please" | 44 | Cindy Church |
| 1998 | "Wichita" | — | Cindy Church |
| 1998 | "Whispering Pines" | — | Cindy Church |
"—" denotes the single failed to chart or not released
