= Sylvia Tyson =

Canadian singer-songwriter (born 1940)

Sylvia Tyson CM
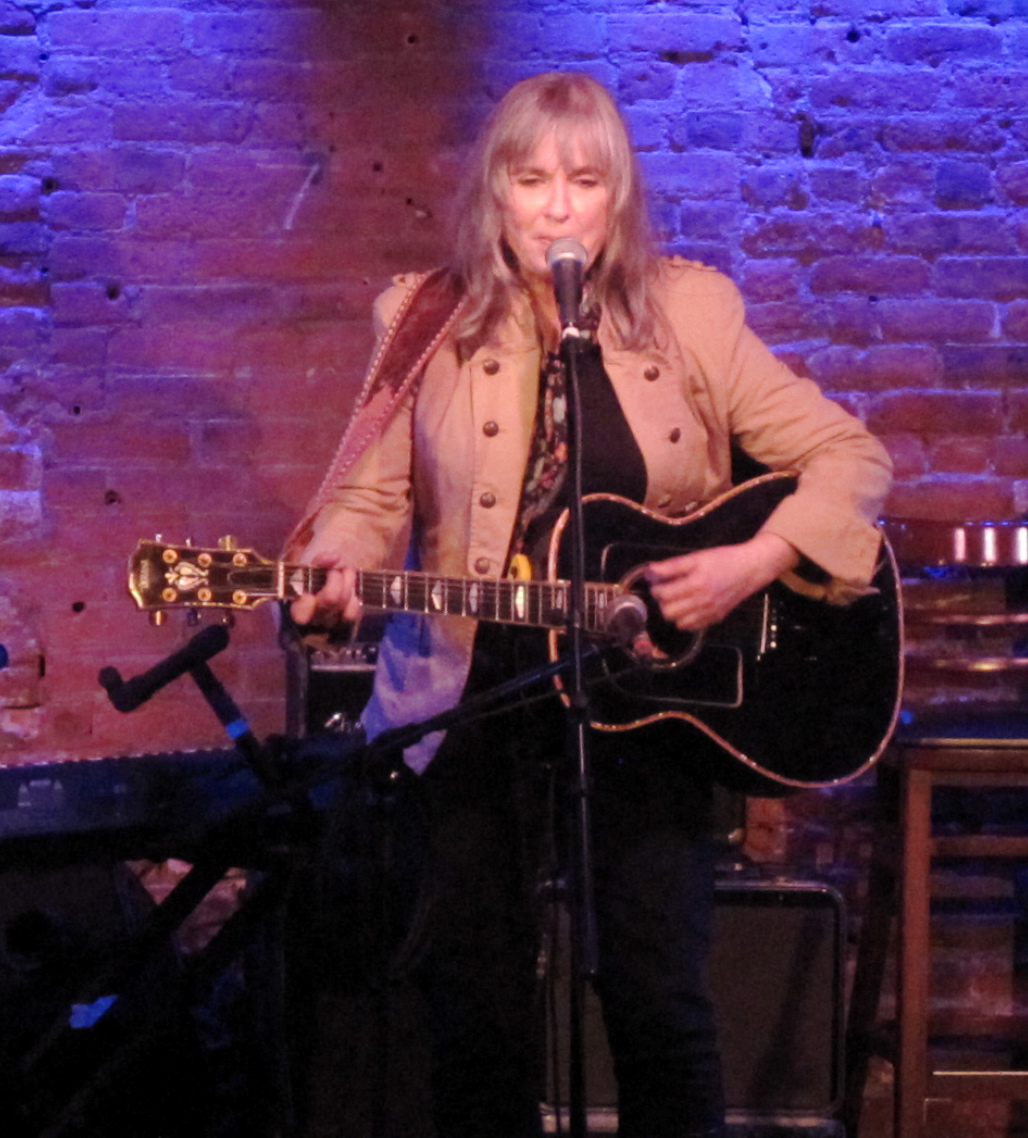
- Tyson in 2010
- Born: Sylvia Fricker; 19 September 1940 (age 86); Chatham, Ontario, Canada
- Known for: "You Were on My Mind"
- Spouse: Ian Tyson (m. 1964–1975)
- Children: 1
- Musical career
- Origin: Toronto, Ontario, Canada
- Genres: Folk, country rock, country
- Occupations: Musician, songwriter, broadcaster, author
- Instruments: Vocals, autoharp, guitar, piano
- Years active: 1959–present
- Labels: Vanguard, Columbia, Capitol, Stony Plain, Salt, Outside
- Website: web.archive.org/web/20220401082228/https://www.quartette.com/tyson.html

Sylvia Tyson, CM (née Fricker; born 19 September 1940) is a Canadian singer-songwriter, musician and broadcaster. She is best known as part of the folk duo Ian & Sylvia, with Ian Tyson. Since 1993, she has been a member of the all-female folk group Quartette.

== Early life ==
Tyson was born Sylvia Fricker in Chatham, Ontario, the second of four children. Her father was an appliance salesman for the T. Eaton Company, and her mother was a church organist and choir leader. At a young age Fricker decided to become a singer. Although her parents tried to discourage her from pursuing a career as an entertainer, she left Chatham in 1959 to perform in Toronto.

== Ian and Sylvia ==
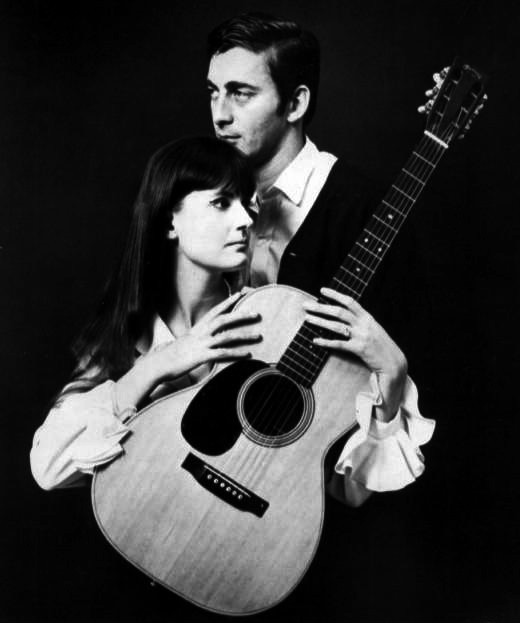
Ian and Sylvia Tyson (1968)

From 1959 to 1974, she was half of the popular folk duo Ian & Sylvia with Ian Tyson. The two met after a friend of Ian's heard her sing at a party and let Ian know about her. Ian had been performing in Toronto clubs as a solo artist, but after he and Fricker met, they decided to work together as a duo. Their full-time collaboration began in 1961 and continued for a decade. From the late 1960s to the early 1970s, she and Ian Tyson also fronted the country rock band Great Speckled Bird.

Sylvia Tyson wrote her first and best-known song "You Were on My Mind" in 1962. It was recorded by Ian & Sylvia in 1964. The song has been covered extensively, but first became a hit single in the mid-1960s for the San Francisco-based folk-rock band We Five, and also for the British pop singer Crispian St. Peters.

Fricker married Ian Tyson on 26 June 1964. During their years together, they recorded 13 albums.

The Tysons were divorced in 1975. During their marriage, they had one child, Clayton Dawson Tyson.

== Later career ==
After the Tysons separated and stopped performing together in 1975, Sylvia started a solo career. She released two albums on Capitol Records, Woman's World in 1975 and Cool Wind from the North in 1976. In 1978, she established an independent record label, Salt Records. With the label she released the albums, Satin on Stone in 1978 and Sugar for Sugar in 1979.

Sylvia Tyson contributed offstage to the Canadian music scene as a board member of FACTOR and the Juno Awards. With Tom Russell, she was an editor of the 1995 anthology And Then I Wrote: The Songwriter Speaks (ISBN 9781551520230). In 2011, she wrote her first novel, Joyner's Dream.

Sylvia joined Ian to sing their signature song "Four Strong Winds" at the 50th anniversary of the Mariposa Folk Festival on 11 July 2010 in Orillia, Ontario.

In 2012, Tyson and singer-songwriter Cindy Church wrote a campaign song for the Alberta Party, a centrist political party in Alberta.

On 3 November 2023, at the age of 83, Tyson released what she states is her last album, titled At the End of the Day. It would earn her an eighth and final Juno Award nomination in 2025, in the category of Traditional Roots Album of the Year.

She confirmed her retirement in 2025, and said that her all-female country-folk supergroup Quartette had decided to call it quits in 2024, after working together for 30 years.

== Awards and recognition ==
Sylvia Tyson was made a member of the Order of Canada in 1994.

She was nominated eight times for a Juno Award, the first being in 1987 as Country Female Vocalist of the Year. The Canadian Music Hall of Fame inducted Ian & Sylvia as a duo in 1992. In 2003, Sylvia Tyson was inducted into the Canadian Country Music Hall of Fame.

In July 2019, it was announced that Ian Tyson and Sylvia Tyson would be inducted into the Songwriters Hall of Fame individually, not as a duo. The Canadian Broadcasting Corporation said that "the duo's 1964's hit, Four Strong Winds, has been deemed one of the most influential songs in Canadian history". The CBC report also referenced the song You Were on My Mind, written by Sylvia Tyson, as well as her four albums (1975–1980).

Tyson was inducted into the Chatham-Kent Cultural Hall of Fame in 2022.

== Discography ==
=== Albums ===
| Year | Album | CAN | Label |
|---|---|---|---|
| 1975 | Woman's World | 54 | Capitol |
| 1976 | Cool Wind from the North | — | Capitol |
| 1978 | Satin on Stone | — | Salt |
| 1979 | Sugar for Sugar, Salt for Salt | — | Salt |
| 1986 | The Big Spotlight | — | Stony Plain Records |
| 1989 | You Were on My Mind | — | Stony Plain Records |
| 1992 | Gypsy Cadillac | — | Silver City |
| 2000 | River Road and Other Stories | — | Salt/Outside |
| 2001 | The Very Best of Sylvia Tyson | — | Varèse Sarabande |
| 2011 | Joyners Dream: The Kingsfold Suite | — | Outside Music |
| 2023 | At the End of the Day | — | Stony Plain Records |

=== Singles ===
| Year | Single | Chart Positions | | Album |
| Year | Single | CAN Country | CAN AC | Album |
|---|---|---|---|---|
| 1972 | "Give It to the World" | — | 44 | single only |
| 1975 | "Sleep on My Shoulder" | 35 | 24 | Woman's World |
| 1976 | "Good Old Song" | 42 | — | Cool Wind from the North |
| 1979 | "Love Is a Fire" | 32 | — | Satin on Stone |
| 1980 | "Same Old Thing" | — | 36 | Sugar for Sugar, Salt for Salt |
| 1985 | "Up in Smoke" | 50 | — | single only |
| 1986 | "Denim Blue Eyes" | 15 | — | The Big Spotlight |
| 1987 | "Too Short a Ride" | 20 | — | The Big Spotlight |
| 1989 | "You Were on My Mind" | 35 | — | You Were on My Mind |
| 1990 | "Slow Moving Heart" | 43 | — | You Were on My Mind |
| 1990 | "Rhythm of the Road" | 42 | — | You Were on My Mind |
| 1990 | "Thrown to the Wolves" (with Tom Russell) | 43 | — | You Were on My Mind |
| 1992 | "I Walk These Rails" | 18 | — | Gypsy Cadillac |
| 1993 | "The Sound of One Heart Breaking" | 52 | — | Gypsy Cadillac |
