= Murray McLauchlan =

Murray McLauchlan CM
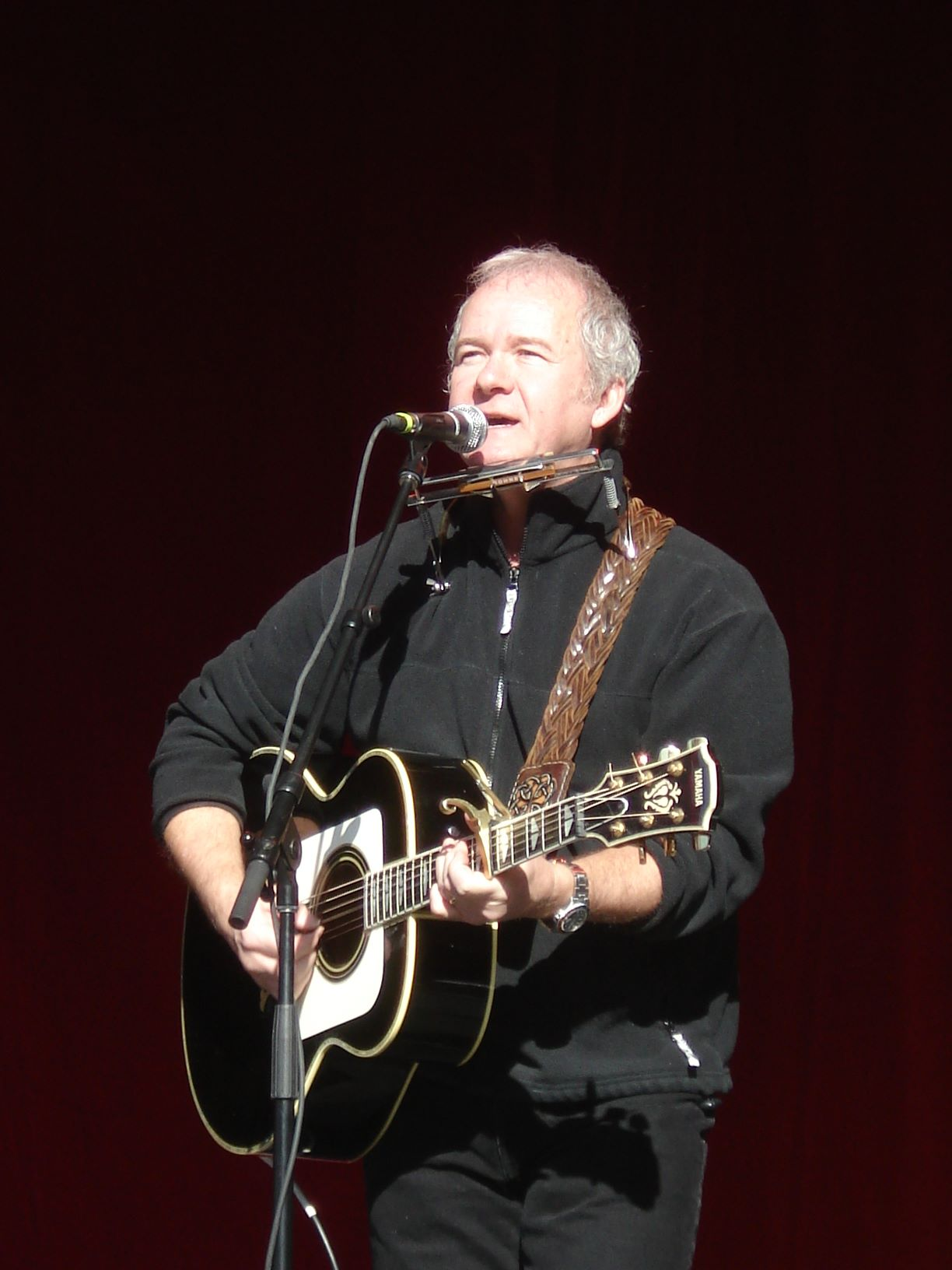
- Murray McLauchlan performing at Winterlude 2009 in Ottawa, Ontario Canada.

Background information
- Born: Murray Edward McLauchlan; 30 June 1948 (age 78); Paisley, Renfrewshire, Scotland
- Origin: Toronto, Ontario, Canada
- Genres: Country, Folk, Rock
- Occupation: Singer-songwriter
- Years active: 1965–present
- Labels: True North; Capitol

Murray Edward McLauchlan, CM (born 30 June 1948) is a Scottish Canadian singer, songwriter, guitarist, pianist, and harmonica player. He is best known for his Canadian hits "The Farmer's Song," "Whispering Rain," and "Down by the Henry Moore".

== Early life ==
McLauchlan was born in Paisley, Renfrewshire, Scotland; he immigrated to Canada with his family when he was five years old. He grew up in suburban Toronto. At 17, he began playing at coffeehouses in Toronto's Yorkville area and later attended Central Tech as an art student before deciding to become a full-time musician.

== Career ==
In the 1960s, McLauchlan moved to New York City, but had little success in promoting his musical career there. In 1970, McLauchlan returned to Toronto and signed with True North Records; he released an album, Songs from the Street in 1971. Over the next several years he had success in the pop, adult contemporary, country, and folk-music fields, with such songs as "Child's Song," the Juno Award-winning "The Farmer's Song" (1973), and "Hurricane of Change" (also 1973).

In 1974 McLauchlan embarked on a long tour in the United States. He later released "Do You Dream of Being Somebody" (1975), and "Whispering Rain" (1979).

In 1980, McLauchlan released the album Into a Mystery, with backing vocals by Carole Pope.

In 1987, McLauchlan appeared on the children's television show, Sharon, Lois & Bram's Elephant Show singing his The Farmer's Song. He appeared in Season 4 of The Elephant Show on the "Urban Cowboy" episode.

McLauchlan hosted the highly rated CBC Radio program Swinging On a Star from 1989 to 1994.

McLauchlan has held a commercial pilot license (CPL) with Instrument flight rating (IFR) and endorsements for multi-engine aircraft and seaplanes for decades. During a performance in the 1980s, McLauchlan commented to audiences, half-jokingly, of "giving this music thing a little more time" before giving it up and returning to flying for a living.

In the late 1990s, McLauchlan was flying commercial airplanes as a "bush pilot" in Northern Canada. In 1984 he starred in a television special called Floating over Canada, in which he piloted a Cessna 185 float plane across Canada. This special was broadcast in Canada on CBC as well as in the U.S. on public television (PBS). This TV special featured several songs from Murray's then current album, "Heroes" and featured a number of special musical guests: Buffy Sainte-Marie, Ian Tyson, Gordon Lightfoot, Sylvie Tremblay, Levon Helm (of The Band), and Edith Butler, all of them representing different aspects and/or regions of Canada.

In 1998, Penguin (Viking Books) released his autobiography The Ballad of Murray McLauchlan: Getting Out of Here Alive.

In 2004 McLauchlan helped form a group known as "Lunch At Allen's" featuring McLauchlan, Marc Jordan, Cindy Church and Ian Thomas. The group formed as a result of meeting in Toronto for lunch at Allen's restaurant after McLauchlan's heart bypass surgery. Three CDs have been released as a result of this collaboration: Lunch at Allens (2004), Catch the Moon (2007) and More Lunch at Allens (2010).

During the summer of 2016, he was performing in Lunch at Allen's in Toronto, Ontario, Canada.

== Awards ==
McLauchlan has won 11 Juno Awards throughout the 1970s and 1980s, and been nominated for a total of 23 Juno awards. In 1993, he was made a Member of the Order of Canada.

In 2001, McLauchlan was the recipient of the National Achievement Award at the annual SOCAN Awards held in Toronto.

McLauchlan was chosen to be inducted into the Canadian Country Music Hall of Fame in September 2016.

In 2018, McLauchlan received a Governor General's Performing Arts Award for Lifetime Achievement https://www.gg.ca/en/media/news/2018/governor-generals-performing-arts-awards

In 2022 Murray was inducted into the Canadian Songwriters Hall of Fame, presented to him by Gordon Lightfoot https://www.cshf.ca/songwriter/murray-mclauchlan

== Family ==
He is married to Denise Donlon, and they have a son, Duncan (b. March 1992).

== Discography ==
=== Albums ===
Year	Album	Chart Positions		CRIA	Label
Year	Album	CAN Country	CAN	CRIA	Label
1971	Song from the Street		38		True North
1972	Murray McLauchlan		38		True North
1973	Day to Day Dust		13		True North
1974	Sweeping the Spotlight Away		34		True North
1975	Only the Silence Remains		39		True North
1976	Boulevard		14	Gold	True North
1977	Hard Rock Town		33		True North
1978	Greatest Hits		57	Gold	True North
1978	Live at the Orpheum (promo only)				Columbia
1979	Whispering Rain	14	42	Gold	True North
1980	Into a Mystery	18	61		True North
1981	Storm Warning		45		True North
1982	Windows				True North
1983	Timberline	22			True North
1984	Heroes				True North
1985	Midnight Break		94		True North
1988	Swinging on a Star	24			Capitol
1991	The Modern Age				Capitol
1996	Gulliver's Taxi				True North
2006	The Songbook...New Arrivals (Songs From The Musical "Eddie")				Capitol/EMI
2007	Songs from the Street: The Best of Murray McLauchlan				True North
2011	Human Writes				True North
2017	Love Can't Tell Time				True North
2021	Hourglass				True North

=== Albums ===
Year	Album	Chart Positions		CRIA	Label
Year	Album	CAN Country	CAN	CRIA	Label
2004	Lunch at Allen's				Capitol/EMI
2007	Catch the Moon				Capitol/EMI
2010	More Lunch at Allen's				Linus
2012	Zuzu’s Petals - A Lunch At Allen’s Christmas				Linus
2017	If It Feels Right				Linus

=== Singles ===
Year	Single	Chart Positions			Album
Year	Single	CAN	CAN AC	CAN Country	Album
1972	"I Just Get Older"	--	--	--	Song from the Street
1972	"Jesus Please Don't Save Me (Till I Die)"	44	--	--	Song from the Street
1973	"Lose We" / "The Farmer's Song"	-- 8	13; 3	-- 8	Murray McLauchlan
1973	"Hurricane of Change"	9	--	--	Day to Day Dust
1974	"Linda, Won't You Take Me In"	15	12	28	Day to Day Dust
1974	"Shoeshine Workin' Song"	59	13	15	Sweeping the Spotlight Away
1975	"Do You Dream of Being Somebody" / "Maybe Tonight"	16 --	9 --	-- 10	Sweeping the Spotlight Away
1975	"Down by the Henry Moore"	12	1	1	Sweeping the Spotlight Away
1975	"Little Dreamer"	15	--	--	Single only
1976	"On the Boulevard"	45	4	25	Boulevard
1976	"Slingback Shoes"	--	--	--	Boulevard
1977	"Love Comes and Goes"	77	--	--	Hard Rock Town
1978	"Straight Outa Midnight"	88	--	--	Hard Rock Town
1979	"Whispering Rain"	24	15	27	Whispering Rain
1979	"You Can't Win" / "Somebody's Long Lonely Tonight"	89 --	-- --	-- 41	Whispering Rain
1979	"You've Got No Time"	--	--	--	Whispering Rain
1980	"Try Walkin' Away" / "Don't Put Your Faith in Men"	53 --	11 --	-- 24	Into a Mystery
1980	"Into a Mystery"	--	--	--	Into a Mystery
1981	"If the Wind Could Blow My Troubles Away"	45	26	--	Storm Warning
1981	"Wouldn't Take Another Chance On Love"	--	--	--	Storm Warning
1982	"Happiness"	--	--	--	Windows
1983	"Jealousy"	--	--	--	Windows
1983	"Animals"	--	--	--	Windows
1983	"Never Did Like That Train"	--	20	18	Timberline
1984	"Red River Flood" / "On the Subject of Loneliness"	-- --	-- 26	18 --	Timberline
1984	"Everything Reminds Me of Loving You"	--	--	37	Timberline
1984	"Railroad Man" / "Sayonara Maverick"	-- --	-- --	19; 60	Heroes
1985	"Song for Captain Keast"	--	--	32	Heroes
1985	"When You Become a Memory" / "I'm Best at Loving You"	-- --	16 --	11; 13	Midnight Break
1986	"Me and Joey"	--	--	34	Midnight Break
1988	"My Imaginary Tree"	--	--	--	Swinging on a Star
1989	"Love with a Capital "L""	--	--	12	Swinging on a Star
1989	"Please Don't Call It Runnin' Away"	--	--	35	Swinging on a Star
1990	"Swinging on a Star"	--	--	23	Swinging on a Star
1991	"The Modern Age"	63	21	75	The Modern Age
1991	"So I Lost Your Love"	--	26	--	The Modern Age
1996	"Secrets in Your Heart"	--	38	--	Gulliver's Taxi
1997	"No Change in Me"	--	48	--	Gulliver's Taxi

== See also ==
- Canadian rock
- Music of Canada
