= Dragons (band) =

English band (2005–2009)

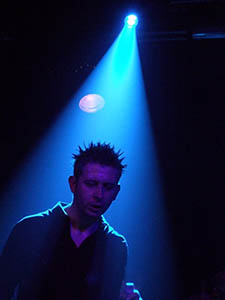
- Dragons performing in 2008

Background information
- Origin: Bristol, England
- Genres: Indie rock, Post-punk revival
- Years active: 2005–2009
- Label: OHM
- Past members: Anthony Tombling Jr (vocals); David Francolini (drums); Jim Fage (bass); Calvin Talbot (guitar); Will Crewdson (guitar); Adam Coombs (synth)
- Website: Dragons.cc

Dragons were an English rock band, formed in 2005 in Bristol by drummer David Francolini.

Although originally a studio project recorded by Francolini in Francolini's own studio "Ohm Recordings", they toured the album with several other musicians including fellow Dark Star and Levitation members Christian Hayes and Laurence O'Keefe, with original Levitation bassist Joe Allen stepping in to fill in for O'Keefe.

After initial live dates with Francolini's former bandmates, the line-up of Adam Coombs (synthesizer), Calvin Talbot (guitar), Will Crewdson (guitar) and Jim Fage (bass) was settled. Their brand of sweeping indie rock is compared to the sound of bands such as Joy Division and Editors. Their debut album, Here are the Roses, was released in June 2007. A follow-up album was recorded with the full band line-up, but remains unmixed and unreleased.

== Albums ==
Year	Album	Label
2007	Here are the Roses	OHM Records
