= Jan Jansen =

Jan Jansen may refer to:

- Jan Jansen (cyclist) (born 1945), Dutch cyclist
- Jan Jansen (historian) (born 1962), Dutch historian
- Jan B. Jansen (1898–1984), Norwegian professor of medicine
- Jan K. S. Jansen (1931–2011), Norwegian professor of medicine
- Jan Helge Jansen (born 1937), Norwegian politician
- Jan Jansen, a Baldur's Gate character

== See also ==
- Jan Jansohn, guitarist
- "Yon Yonson", a children's rhyme
- Jan Janszoon (c. 1570–1641), Dutch pirate
- Jan Janssen (disambiguation)
- Jan Jansson (disambiguation)
