= Little Hell =

Little Hell may refer to:

- Little Hell (band), a rock band formed in 2001 by Steve Ludwin
- Little Hell (album), a 2011 album by City and Colour
- Little Hell, Virginia, an unincorporated community in Accomack County, Virginia
- Little Hell, Delaware, an unincorporated community in Kent County, Delaware
- El Infiernito, Colombia, Spanish for "Little Hell", a pre-Columbian Muisca site

== See also ==
- Little Hells, a 2009 album by Marissa Nadler
