= Dark Star (band) =

English psychedelic rock band (1996–2001)

- Origin: London, England
- Genres: Alternative rock, indie rock, psychedelic rock
- Years active: 1996–2001
- Label: Harvest
- Past members: Christian Hayes; David Francolini; Laurence O'Keefe

Dark Star were an English psychedelic rock band, formed in 1996 in London. The band was composed of vocalist/guitarist Christian Hayes, drummer David Francolini and bassist Laurence O'Keefe.

== History ==
=== Origins ===
All three members of Dark Star had been members of the psychedelic rock band Levitation between 1990 and 1994, with David Francolini also previously having played with Something Pretty Beautiful and The Blue Aeroplanes, Christian Hayes with Cardiacs, Ring, Panixphere and The Dave Howard Singers, and Laurence O'Keefe with The Jazz Butcher. Following the demise of Levitation, Hayes began working with Heather Nova and All About Eve's Julianne Regan and O'Keefe collaborated with Dead Can Dance's Brendan Perry, whilst Francolini stopped playing due to disillusionment with the music industry (although he did help Scottish band Octopus get signed to Food Records and produced their debut album From A to B).

In 1996, Francolini suggested to Hayes and O'Keefe that the three of them should start working together again, stating that "there was always this sense of unfinished business". The trio booked a studio and started rehearsing the day after they went to see Sonic Youth play at The Forum in Kentish Town in April that year. After advertising for and auditioning several singers including Daisy Chainsaw and Queenadreena guitarist Crispin Gray, Hayes took over vocals. Francolini commented that the singers they auditioned "seemed to suck the power out of it... it was weird. Really good people we worked with, you know? But once they opened their gob, it was like the power of the group was gone".

The band first signed a publishing deal with Warner/Chappell Music. When the A&R scout they were dealing with there moved to work at EMI, their first action in their new job was to sign the band.

=== First EPs and Twenty Twenty Sound ===
Dark Star released their debut EP Graceadelica in 1998 on Harvest Records, the progressive rock subsidiary of EMI. They released their second EP I Am The Sun in 1999, along with their debut single About 3am.

The band released their debut album, Twenty Twenty Sound on 21 June 1999. Produced by Steve Lillywhite, the album was recorded live, with Hayes stating that the band "recorded it all live so basically we just got in there, set up and did what we always do and got the best take. It's the best way to record a record really. If you haven't seen us live you may not think that, but it's exactly like we play it—there's no overdubs. It's basically what we do, it's what we play". Francolini described the band's sound as "Levitation, with all the chrome stripped off and painted matt black", with Hayes stating that he personally thought they sounded "like Hawkwind and The Pixies". The album was followed by re-releases of "Graceadelica" and "I Am The Sun" (albeit in remixed form), which gave the band two Top 40 UK Singles Chart hits.

=== Unreleased second album and split ===
Following the promotional and touring cycle of Twenty Twenty Sound, the band recorded two tracks with record producer and remixer Danny Saber (who remixed "Graceadelica" for single release) in Los Angeles. Seemingly scrapping that session, the band entered the studio later that year to record their second album. Songs including "Roman Road", "The Last Thing She Ever Said", "Clicky" and "Three Seconds" were played during the band's shows in 2000 including festival dates such as Reading and Leeds Festivals and T In The Park as well as a live show recorded for STV show Boxed Set.

Despite lead-off single Strangers And Madmen being premiered on the BBC Radio 1 show The Evening Session, the band parted ways with EMI shortly after. Commenting on the split with EMI, Francolini later revealed that the band "experienced losing a couple of key players who left the company and that coupled with the fact that we resolutely towed [sic] our own musical line, led to the parting of the ways".

A new record deal was tentatively sought, however the band subsequently split in 2001 with no announcement, to pursue different projects. The single and album were left unreleased until 2023.

=== Post-split ===
David Francolini returned to Bristol and set up a recording studio, as well as forming a new studio-based band with singer Anthony Tombling Jr, called Dragons. Although news of the project first emerged in 2003, the band's debut album Here Are the Roses didn't surface until 2007. Early live shows to promote the album featured both Hayes and O'Keefe. Dragons disbanded in 2009. In the interim, Francolini had produced and played on the 2005 Julian Cope album Citizen Cain'd under the pseudonym Mitch Razor.

Christian Hayes toured with the Pet Shop Boys as live guitarist (reproducing parts originated by Johnny Marr) and worked as guitar tech/tour/production manager for the likes of My Bloody Valentine, Kula Shaker and David Cassidy. In 2007, he began releasing archive releases of previously unreleased solo material (recording during and shortly after his time with Levitation) under the name of Mikrokosmos via Ingatia Recordings. A trio of releases, In the Heart of the Home, The Seven Stars and final installment in 2014 Terra Familiar have been issued.

In 2011, Hayes organised and compiled the tribute record Leader of the Starry Skies in aid of Cardiacs frontman Tim Smith, who had suffered two strokes in 2008 which left him paralysed down one side of his body and unable to speak. Hayes also toured with a stage version of Macbeth in 2011 and 2012, produced by Platform 4 and described as "a taut psychodrama that crackles with a wild electricity, brought alive by the sonic experiments of composer and guitarist Bic Hayes and sound designer Jules Bushel". More recently Hayes has been involved in several improvisational instrumental psychedelic bands in Brighton, including ZOFFF and LSD-25 and formed both the psychedelic duo M U M M Y and the audio/visual project Cuts with his partner, Jo Spratley.

Laurence O'Keefe went on to work as a roadie and session bassist, working with the likes of Sophia, Dead Can Dance and Martina Topley-Bird.

== Belated release of second album ...out flew reason ==
An unmastered seven-track version of the scrapped second album, titled Zurich and omitting "Roman Road" and "Valentine", had been leaked within a couple of years of the split. Titled . A later nine-track version of the album appeared on SoundCloud described as "[the] Unreleased 2nd album from Dark Star", which included the previously omitted tracks.

In January 2015, Christian Hayes appeared on Brighton & Hove Community Radio show The Real Music Club, where he stated that he hoped to release the second album that year. He played the previously unreleased song The Only Way, which was set to appear on the release but wasn't on the originally sequenced planned release. He confirmed that there were no plans for the band to reunite. In January 2022, Hayes guested on The C86 Show where he shared news that the long shelved second album had recently been finished and was ready for mastering.

On 15 February 2023 the release of a then-recently finished second album was announced on Bandcamp, with a release date of 21 February 2023. The finished album was titled ...out flew reason and contained seven of the nine tracks from the Zurich leak, adding two more for a nine-track album.

The seven tracks included from previous leaks were recorded at Rockfield Studios in 2000, with the further two added tracks recorded at Westlake Recording Studios during the scrapped sessions with Danny Sabre in 2001. The description included on Bandcamp also promised that new Dark Star material was to follow in 2023 (although to date this has not emerged). This has since been updated to state that new material is set to emerge in 2025.

== Cover art ==
The cover art on all Dark Star releases up to I Am the Sun in 2000 was by Tom Phillips, an artist from Peckham, South London. The images he used were based on his work A Humument, an illustrative and textual reworking of an 1892 Victorian novel. Phillips had previously contributed similar artwork for the sleeve of the King Crimson album Starless and Bible Black.

== Band members ==
- Christian Hayes – lead vocals, guitars
- David Francolini – drums
- Laurence O'Keefe – bass, backing vocals

== Discography ==
=== Studio albums ===
- Twenty Twenty Sound (Harvest Records, 1999, No. 133)
- ...Out Flew Reason (self-released, 2023)

=== Singles and EPs ===
- Graceadelica (EP) (1998) Editions include tracks The Crow Song, New Model Worker and Solitude Song.
- I Am the Sun (EP) (1999). Edition of the single (as well as remixes) include tracks Faltering, Birds, Bugs, Living Under Ground and Semaphore.
- About 3am (EP) (1999, No. 50). Editions include (as well as remixes) tracks S.P.A.M., Henry Beckett, Light Years and Gee. St.
- "Graceadelica" (remix single) (2000, No. 25)
- "I Am the Sun" (remix single) (2000, No. 31)
