= From A to B (Octopus album) =

Studio album by Octopus
- Released: 30 September 1996
- Recorded: Sawmill, Nomis, Townhouse III, Strong Room, The Church, The Free Movement Mobile studios, London
- Genres: Britpop, psychedelic pop, alternative rock
- Length: 51:37
- Label: Food
- Producer: David Francolini

Singles from From A to B
- 1. "Magazine" Released: March 1996; 2. "Your Smile" Released: June 1996; 3. "Saved" Released: September 1996; 4. "Jealousy" Released: November 1996

From A to B is the only album by the British alternative rock band Octopus, released on 30 September 1996 on Food Records. The album contained four singles, all of which charted within the British Top 100 (although only one, "Saved", scraped into the Top 40).

== Recording ==
From A to B was recorded in various sessions in six different studios. The band was signed on the strength of Shearer's home 4-track recordings before the label had even seen them play live. Mike Smith, then of EMI publishing was impressed with the depth and breadth of Shearer's writing, comparing him to Julian Cope. Shearer offered a box of 4-track recordings to David Francolini who wanted to produce the album. These were used as the sketch of the album. The band's producer was David Francolini (formerly the drummer with Levitation and later performing the same role for Dark Star) with Chris Sheldon and John Cornfield assisting with several of the mixes.

During the recording, various external musicians were brought in to add to the band's sound, with Shearer being particularly influenced by The Beach Boys and The Beatles as well as The Pink Floyd and Syd Barrett (where they get their name). Only five of the album's fifteen tracks do not feature a guest bass guitar player: the other ten tracks feature bass playing by sessions musician Dave Quinn, Francolini's former Levitation colleague Robert White (also of The Milk and Honey Band), or the original Octopus bass guitarist Steven McSeveney. In addition, Francolini plays drums on two tracks and piano on another, as well as playing Moog synthesizer on five tracks and contributing keyboards, percussion, samples and various noises throughout the album. Francolini also co-wrote six of the album's songs, including the single "Magazine" although Marc Shearer wrote every song on the album. The recording process was long and expensive with the band experimenting in Sawmill's Studio, using the natural creek as echo and recording in tents. The backwards guitar solo on "Your Smile" is from the original 4-track recording done in Shearer's kitchen in Glasgow and the album is a mixture of high and low production values. Other contributing musicians include both core members of Blowpipe (Robin and Andrew Blick, the latter of whom was part of Octopus' live brass section), singer Katherine Blake (Mediaeval Baebes, Miranda Sex Garden), folk musician Nigel Mazlyn Jones and cellist Audrey Riley. Many songs were recorded during the several sessions with the band pulling in a more psychedelic direction and the label looking for pop hits like "Jealousy" which Shearer had written as a wry comment on pop singles. When the initial singles, "Magazine", "Your Smile" and "Saved" were not major hits, EMI pushed for the release of "Jealousy" believing it to be radio friendly but it also failed to perform well in the charts.

The album has a secret message, based on the works of J. D. Salinger, encoded in the sequencing of the tracks which was done at Abbey Road, but nobody has worked it out.

== Package design ==
From a to b featured a striking CD booklet/record inner sleeve design, consisting of a specially designed board game and cut-out pieces.

== Track listing ==
1. "Your Smile" (Marc Shearer) – 3:55
2. "Everyday Kiss" (Shearer) – 2:52
3. "If You Want to Give Me More" (Shearer/David Francolini) – 3:38
4. "King for a Day" (Shearer) – 4:52
5. "Adrenalina" (Shearer/Francolini) – 3:26
6. "Untitled" (a.k.a. "Car") – 2:15
7. "Jealousy" (Shearer/Alan McSeveney) – 2:38
8. "Magazine" (Shearer/McSeveney/Francolini) – 2:37
9. "From A to B" (Shearer/McSeveney/Francolini) – 3:52
10. "Untitled" (a.k.a. "Airplane") – 0:21
11. "Saved" (Shearer/McSeveney) – 4:04
12. "Wait and See" (Shearer) – 3:50
13. "Theme from Joy Pop" (Shearer/McSeveney/Francolini) – 4:05
14. "Night Song" (Shearer/Francolini) – 3:01
15. "In This World" (Shearer) – 6:03

(Tracks 6 and 10 did not have printed titles, being represented by pictograms of a car and an airplane respectively. They were written by Shearer and McSeveney.)

== Personnel ==
=== Octopus ===
- Marc Shearer - vocals, guitar, piano, keyboards
- Alan McSeveney - guitar, piano, keyboards
- Steven McSeveney - bass guitar
- Oliver Grasset - drums, percussion

=== Octopus live musicians ===
- Andrew Blick, James Donaldson (trumpets)
- Mike Servent (piano)
- Nick Reynolds (harmonica)
- Steven McSeveney (bass guitar)
- Cameron Miller (bass guitar)

=== Additional musicians and production staff ===
- David Francolini - production; Moog synthesizer on "Everyday Kiss", "If You Want to Give Me More", "Jealousy", "Wait and See" & "Theme from Joy Pop", drums on "Saved" & "Wait and See", piano on "Theme from Joy Pop"; also credited with percussion, keyboards, samples, "morse code", "psychedelic diagnosis"; mixing on all tracks except "Your Smile","If You Want to Give Me More","Saved","Wait and See","Theme from Joy Pop" & "Night Song"
- Dave Quinn - bass guitar on "Your Smile", "If You Want to Give Me More", "Adrenaline", "Jealousy", & "Saved"
- Steven McSeveney - bass guitar on "Everyday Kiss", "Magazine" & "Theme from Joy Pop"
- Robert White - bass guitar on "From a to b", "Wait and See", additional piano on "Saved"
- Robin Blick - trumpet on "Everyday Kiss" & "Theme from Joy Pop"
- Nigel Mazlyn Jones - dulcimer on "Untitled" (a.k.a. "Car") & "Untitled" (a.k.a. "Airplane")
- Effie Fenton - flute on "Untitled" (a.k.a. "Car")
- The Tentaculars - percussion on "From a to b"
- Audrey Riley - cello & string arrangements on "Saved" & "Theme from Joy Pop"
- Chris Tombling, Jane Harris - violins on "Saved" & "Theme from Joy Pop"
- Sue Dench - viola on "Saved" & "Theme from Joy Pop"
- Katherine Blake - backing vocals on "Adrenaline" & "Saved"
- Chris Sheldon - mixing on "Your Smile", "If You Want to Give Me More", "Saved", "Wait and See", "Theme from Joy Pop", "Night Song"
