= Octopus (Scottish band) =

Britpop band

- Origin: Shotts, Lanarkshire, Scotland
- Genres: Alternative rock Britpop
- Years active: 1993–1997
- Label: Food
- Past members: Marc Shearer; Alan McSeveney; Steven McSeveney; Cameron Miller; Oliver Grasset

Octopus were a Britpop band from Shotts, Lanarkshire, Scotland formed in 1993. They had three hit singles before splitting up in 1997.

== History ==
The band was formed in Shotts, Lanarkshire, Scotland (near Glasgow) by schoolfriends Marc Shearer (vocals, guitar, keyboards), Alan McSeveney (guitar), Steven McSeveney (bass guitar) and Bob Holmes (drums). The group relocated to London and recruited drummer Olivier Grasset (replacing Holmes).

After playing several times in London (the first of which included a visit and constructive critique from Damon Albarn) Octopus were spotted by Levitation drummer David Francolini. He passed their demo to Food Records boss Andy Ross, who signed the band, releasing their debut single, "Magazine" in March 1996. While retaining the four-piece creative core, the band onstage had by now expanded to an octet with the addition of trumpeters James Donaldson and Andrew Blick (the latter also of Blowpipe), pianist Mike Servent and harmonica player Nick Reynolds (son of Great Train Robber Bruce Reynolds).

Octopus toured with Sleeper and second single "Your Smile" gave them their first hit, peaking at number 42 on the UK Singles Chart. "Your Smile" was followed by "Saved", which saw them break into the top 40. Octopus' first (and only) album, From a to b, was released in September 1996 and featured all three of the singles released to date. Cameron Miller (bass guitar, replacing Steven McSeveney) joined the group after the recording of the album. A fourth single, "Jealousy", reached number 59, and proved to be Octopus' final release, the band splitting up in 1997.

Miller would later join Andrew Blick in Blowpipe, and play with both Ben Christophers and Adem. Shearer also played with Adem and recorded solo material, with "Magma on My Mind" included on the 2009 compilation A Psychedelic Guide To Monsterism Island on Lo Recordings, later recording as Marc Meon. Original bass player Steven McSeveney went on to play with The Secret Goldfish.

== Discography ==
=== Albums ===
- From A to B (September 1996), Food – UK No. 82

=== Singles ===
- "Magazine" (March 1996), Food – UK No. 86
- "Your Smile" (June 1996), Food – UK No. 42
- "Saved" (September 1996), Food – UK No. 40
- "Jealousy" (November 1996), Food – UK No. 59

== EPs ==
- "All The Fear of the Fayre" (May 1996, Japan-only), Toshiba EMI Ltd
