= From A to B =

From A to B may refer to:

- From A to B in geometry
- From A to B (New Musik album)
- From A to B (Octopus album)
- From A to B (film), a 2015 Emirati film
