= Jan Jansson =

Jan Jansson may refer to:

- Jan Janssonius, (1588 - 1664), also known as Jan Jansson and Jan Janszoon, Dutch cartographer who lived and worked in Amsterdam in the 17th century
- Jan Jansson (footballer) (born 1968), Swedish footballer

== See also ==
- Jan Jansen (disambiguation)
- Jan Jansohn, guitarist
- Jan Janssen (disambiguation)
