= Jan Janssen (disambiguation) =

Jan Janssen (born 1940) is a Dutch road bicycle racer.

Jan Janssen may also refer to:

- Jan Janssen (gymnast) (1885–1953), Dutch Olympic gymnast
- Jan Janssen (ice hockey) (born 1952), former ice hockey player

== See also ==
- Jan Jansen (disambiguation)
- Jan Jansohn, guitarist
- Jan Jansson (disambiguation)
