= Tom Phillips (artist) =

British artist (1937–2022)

Tom Phillips CBE RA
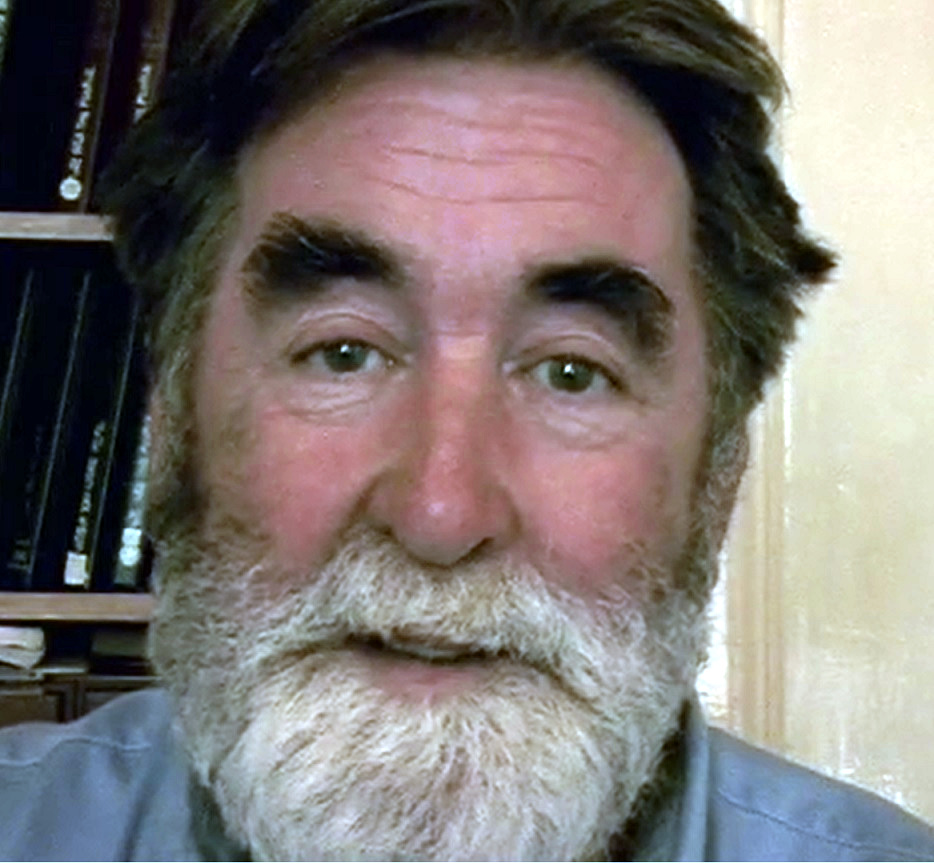
- Phillips in Speaking Portraits, 2009
- Born: Trevor Thomas Phillips; 25 May 1937; Clapham, London, England
- Died: 28 November 2022 (aged 85); Peckham, London, England
- Education: St Catherine's College, Oxford; Camberwell College of Arts; Royal College of Art
- Known for: Painting, printmaking and collage
- Spouses: Jill Purdy (m. 1961; dissolved 1988); Fiona Maddocks (m. 1995)
- Awards: Royal Academician (1984); CBE (2002)

Trevor Thomas Phillips CBE RA (25 May 1937 – 28 November 2022) was an English visual artist. He was a painter, printmaker and collagist.

== Early life and education ==
Trevor Thomas Phillips was born on 25 May 1937 in Clapham, London to David and Margaret Phillips (née Arnold). He was the younger of two sons.

In 1940, the cotton market collapsed and the Phillips family had to sell their home. Phillips' father went to work in Abergavenny in Wales, leaving his wife to run the boarding-house in London. After the war, the family finances improved and they were able to holiday annually in France and Germany. His parents began to buy short leasehold properties as investments and although these did not yield the return that they wished, his mother did buy the freehold of one house, which would later become her son's studio and home.

From 1942 to 1947, Phillips attended Bonneville Road Primary School in Clapham. He said that while he was there he "learned the word artist and discovered that an artist is someone who does not have to put his paints away, so [I] decided to become one". Although he enjoyed school, he was noted for his fascination with drawing and his refusal to conform. His mother recalled him buying a platform ticket every Sunday and taking long railway journeys when he was just 11 years old.

Phillips progressed to Henry Thornton Grammar School in Clapham, where he developed his love of music, playing violin and bassoon in the school orchestra and singing solo baritone in school concerts and stage events.

In 1954, Phillips exhibited paintings for the first time, in an open art show on the railings of the Thames Embankment. A year later, aged 17, he won a travel scholarship to France, where he lived for three months. His mother remembers him returning to London with a sack of horse bones from the First World War. He had also bought himself a piano and started to teach himself to play.

In 1957, Phillips became a founder member of the Philharmonia Chorus.

From 1958 to 1960, Phillips read English Literature and Anglo Saxon at St Catherine's College, Oxford. Whilst there, he attended life-drawing classes at the Ruskin School of Drawing and Fine Art, acted in plays, and designed and illustrated the Isis magazine.

Upon graduation, Phillips taught Art, Music and English at Aristotle Road School in Brixton, London. He also attended evening classes in life drawing, under Frank Auerbach, and sculpture at Camberwell College of Arts, where he became a full-time student in 1961, graduating in 1964.

== Career ==
=== 1960s: Early career ===
In 1964, Phillips' work was selected for that year's Young Contemporaries Exhibition in London and, in the following year, the AIA Galleries in London exhibited his first one-man show.

Phillips became a teacher at Ipswich School of Art. One of his students was Brian Eno, who would become a lifelong friend and with whom he would later collaborate with (from 1966 onwards). Phillips soon moved to teach Liberal Studies at Walthamstow Polytechnic, where he met the pianist John Tilbury and participated in improvisation concerts at several polytechnics.

In 1966, Phillips exhibited at the Royal Academy Summer Exhibition for the first time, started work on A Humument.

When Cornelius Cardew founded the Scratch Orchestra, its constitution was drafted in Phillips' garden in Bath (where he had become a teacher at the Bath Academy of Art) and he participated in most of the concerts until he became disillusioned with its politicization.

In 1968, Phillips moved to Wolverhampton to teach at Wolverhampton School of Art, and he had a second one-man exhibition, at the Ikon Gallery in Birmingham.

=== 1970s ===
Throughout the 1970s Phillips' works were exhibited widely in one-man shows and collections.

After a period as a visiting tutor at the Art School in Kassel, Germany, he abandoned teaching and took his first trip to Africa. In 1973, he began the 20 Sites n Years photographic project. In 1975, his first significant publication, Works/Texts I, was published by Hansjörg Mayer and his first retrospective exhibition toured Europe. This was also the year that he met Marvin and Ruth Sackner, who were to become his patrons and founded an archive in Miami to house most of his work.

1974 saw the completion of the privately printed edition of A Humument, which had been published in ten sections since 1971.

In 1978, Brian Eno produced a recording of Irma for Obscure Records directed by Gavin Bryars with a cast including Howard Skempton and Phillips himself. Phillips began contributing regular reviews to The Times Literary Supplement (now TLS).

=== 1980s ===
At the beginning of the 1980s, Phillips designed a series of tapestries for his old Oxford college and he returned to portraiture with a portrait of Pella Erskine-Tulloch (the bookbinder who bound Phillips' favourite version of A Humument in three volumes).

Erskine-Tulloch became the subject of a series of weekly sittings which he described as "Pella on Sunday". He had moved out of the family home at 102 Grove Lane and moved back into his studio at 57 Talfourd Road in Peckham. A man with a great pleasure in habit, he would lunch every Tuesday in the Choumert Café on Choumert Road.

In 1983, Phillips' private limited edition of his own translation of Dante's Inferno illustrated with his prints was published. In 1986, Peter Greenaway and Phillips co-directed A TV Dante, a television miniseries adaptation of the first eight cantos of the Inferno, with John Gielgud and Bob Peck, which was broadcast on Channel 4. During this time he also collaborated with Malcolm Bradbury, Adrian Mitchell, Jake Auerbach, Richard Minsky and Heather McHugh.

In 1984, Phillips was elected a Royal Academician.

=== 1990s ===
At the beginning of the 1990s, Phillips painted portraits of the Monty Python team. He also produced a glass screen and paintings for The Ivy restaurant in London. He illustrated Plato's Symposium for the Folio Society (for whom he would illustrate Waiting for Godot in 1999). Phillips completed his Curriculum Vitae series of paintings. He published his book Works and Texts.

In 1994, Phillips went to Harvard as Artist in Residence at the Carpenter Center for the Visual Arts. In the same year, he published Merely Connect, which he had written with Salman Rushdie during a series of portrait sittings.

With the move to a new studio in Bellenden Road and a change of ownership of the Choumert Café, Phillips began to lunch regularly opposite his studio at the Crossroads Café, where he could be found reading literary magazines through his blue-rimmed spectacles.

As part of the Africa95 celebration of African arts throughout Britain, he curated the 1995 exhibition Africa: the Art of a Continent for the Royal Academy and became their Chairman of Exhibitions.

In the mid-1990s, Phillips began to move into new areas: stage design, The Postcard Century for Thames & Hudson (building on his passion for postcards), quilting, mud drawings and wire structures. He began illustrating Ulysses. He also translated the libretto of Otello while he was designing the English National Opera production.

In 1998, Largo Records released Six of Hearts, a CD of Phillips' songs and other music written since 1992 but this went out of print when the label failed in 2002.

By the late 1990s, Phillips was an establishment figure in most aspects of the arts. He became a trustee of the National Portrait Gallery, an Honorary Fellow of the London Institute, an Honorary Member of the Royal Society of Portrait Painters and a Trustee of the British Museum.

=== 2000s ===
In 2000, Phillips designed lampposts, pavements, gates and arches for Southwark Council's Peckham Renewal Project. Antony Gormley, whose workshop adjoins Phillips' studio in Bellenden Road, Peckham, designed bollards for the same project and the work of both artists adorns that street.

Phillips was made a Commander of the Order of the British Empire for services to the Arts in the 2002 Queen's Birthday Honours list.

In 2003, Phillips designed a Royal Mint commemorative five-pound coin for the 50th anniversary of the 1953 coronation of Queen Elizabeth II.

From 2005–2006, Phillips was Slade Professor of Fine Art at the University of Oxford.

=== Estate ===
The Bodleian Library in Oxford acquired most of Phillip's archive directly from Phillips between 2007–13. They acquired further items in 2025 with the support of an Art Fund grant, a V&A Purchase Grant and a private donor. It owns the only version of the Humument in the UK.

== Works ==
=== Collage ===
==== A Humument ====
Phillips' best known work is A Humument: A Treated Victorian Novel originally by W.H. Mallock.

In 1966, Phillips went to a bookseller's with the intention of buying a cheap book to use as the basis of an art project. He bought the first book he found, a novel called A Human Document by Victorian author William Hurrell Mallock, and began a long project of creating art from its pages. He painted, collaged or drew over the pages, leaving some of the text peeking through in serpentine bubble shapes, creating a "found" text with its own story, different from the original. He said:

"I plundered, mined and undermined its text to make it yield the ghosts of other possible stories, scenes, poems, erotic incidents and surrealist catastrophes that seemed to lurk within its wall of words"

Characters from Mallock's novel appear in the new story, but the protagonist is a new character named "Bill Toge", whose surname can only appear on pages that originally contained words such as "together" or "altogether". Toge's story is a meditation on unrequited love and the struggle to create and appreciate art.

Several editions of A Humument have been published over the years, with more pages being revised each time. The sixth and final edition was published in 2016.

==== Other collage work ====
Phillips used the same technique (always with the Mallock source material) in many of his other works, including the illustration of his own translation of Dante's Inferno (published in 1985).

Phillips was also fond of re-using images from postcards (which he avidly collected), as well as drawing stencil-style lettering, freehand. With these works, Phillips used famous pieces of literature and art in his work. The melding of visual art with textual content was a hallmark of his work.

=== Composition and musical collaborations ===
Phillips first musical composition was Four Pieces for Tilbury.

In 1969, he wrote the opera Irma, using the Humument source material for the libretto. He also wrote the libretto for Heart of Darkness, a chamber opera with music by Tarik O'Regan currently in development with American Opera Projects.

Phillips provided cover art for music albums including:

- Starless and Bible Black by King Crimson (1974)
- Another Green World by Brian Eno (1975)
- One of the 16 portraits that form Peter Blake's design for Face Dances by The Who (1981)
- Dark Star's Twenty Twenty Sound (1999), where used the same technique as The Humument, but with the album's lyrics as the source material.

=== Painting ===
He also painted portraits (his portrait of Dame Iris Murdoch is well known) and murals. His portrait of Michael Kustow won joint Hunting Art Prize in 1988.

Phillips made a series of paintings called Terminal Greys, consisting of simple cross-hatched bars of murky, grayish paint composed from the leftovers on his palette at the end of each work day. The idea behind this work was that, since there are no aesthetic judgments on the artist's part in the creation of these works, they are virtually mechanical; the "art" could be said to lie in the conception of the work and not in the accidental "grey rainbow" appearance of the result.

=== Photography ===
For Phillip's project 20 Sites n Years, he photographed the same 20 spots in his studio's neighbourhood, once a year. As the years went by, the neighbourhood gradually changed.

=== Sculpture and installation ===
Phillips created installation art and sculpture.

== Exhibitions ==
=== Solo ===
Year	Title	Institution	Location	Ref
1965		AIA Galleries		
1968		Ikon Gallery	Birmingham	
1975		European tour		
2006		Ashmolean Museum	Oxford	

=== Group ===
Year	Title	Institution	Location	Ref
1954		Thames Embankment, London		
1964	Young Contemporaries		London	
1966	Summer Exhibition	Royal Academy	London	
2006	Summer Exhibition	Royal Academy	London	

In 2006 Phillips exhibited six works in the Royal Academy Summer Exhibition, among them "Colour Sudoku",

== Personal life ==
While studying at Camberwell College of Arts, Phillips married Jill. They had two children: Ruth (born 1964) and Leo. They would remain married until 1988.

Phillips lived and worked in Peckham for most of his life.

He celebrated his fiftieth birthday by playing a game of cricket with many of his friends at the Kennington Oval cricket ground.

In 1995, he married the writer Fiona Maddocks, Music Critic of The Observer.

Phillips died from cancer at his home in Peckham, London, on 28 November 2022, aged 85.

== Selected bibliography ==
Exhibition catalogues

- Tom Phillips: New and Recent Work [catalogue of the exhibition held at Flowers East 26 November – 24 December 2004], London.
- We are the People: Postcards from the Collection of Tom Phillips [catalogue of the exhibition held at The Nation Portrait Gallery 2 March- 20 June 2004], London.
- Fifty Years of Tom Phillips [catalogue of the exhibition held at Flowers 12 March – 4 April 1987], London.

Monographs

- Paschal, H., & T. Phillips (1992),Tom Phillips: Works and Texts. London: Thames and Hudson Ltd.
- Phillips, T., & N. Rosenthal (2005), Merry Meetings: Drawings and Texts by Toms Phillips. D3 Editions Publishers.
- Phillips, T. (2012), A Humument: A Treated Victorian Novel. London: Thames and Hudson Ltd.
- Music in Art and Africa: The Art of a Continent
