= John Jacob Jingleheimer Schmidt =

Children's song

"John Jacob Jingleheimer Schmidt" is a traditional children's song which consists of one verse repeated, each time increasing or decreasing in volume or tempo.

== Lyrics and melody ==
There are various lyrics to the song. For example (in the following version) the verse is first repeated normally (followed with the last line "Da-da-da"). The volume verses are repeated four times (often while altering the volume or pitch). If the volume is lowered, the last line (the "Da-da-da!") often remains constant, shouted even as the rest of the song reduces to a whisper. The verse is repeated four times—through a whisper on the fourth and final—but the closing (the "Da-da-da!") is always louder.

== Origin ==
While the origins of the song are obscure, some evidence places its roots with vaudeville and theatre acts of the late 19th century and early 20th century popular in immigrant communities. Some vaudeville acts during the era, such as the work of Joe Weber and Lew Fields, often gave voice to shared frustrations of German-American immigrants and heavily leaned on malapropisms and difficulties with the English language as a vehicle for their humor. "John Jacob Jingleheimer Schmidt" shares many characteristics with "My Name Is Jan Jansen", a song that can trace its origin to Swedish vaudeville in the late 19th century.

The song appears to have already become widely known by the mid-twentieth century. It received a major boost when it was circulated throughout the country during scout troop gatherings in the late 1920s and early 1930s. In 1926, The Times newspaper of Munster, Indiana, printed that, during a Girl Scout outing, the scouts sat around a camp fire and "it was solemnly announced that John Jacob Jingleheimer Smith after a long and useful life had died from overwork on the way to Whiting. He was buried with due ceremony and his ghost is not to be seen until October first. All the favorite camp songs were sung." In 1927, the Portsmouth Daily Times reported that a group of boys from the state YMCA camp sang several camp songs, including "John Jacob Jingleheimer Schmidt." In 1931, Elmira, New York, newspaper the Star-Gazette reported that at a Boy Scout gathering at Seneca Lake, as scouts entered the mess hall, "Troop 18 soon burst into the first camp song, 'John Jacob Jingleheimer Smith'." A 1941 Milwaukee Journal article also refers to the song, with the same alternate title of "John Jacob Jingleheimer Smith."

The song is indefinitely repetitive, in a similar manner to "The Song That Doesn't End", "Yon Yonson" or "Michael Finnegan".

Versions of the song appear in other languages, such as the Spanish rendition, "Juan Paco Pedro de la Mar".
