= Irma (opera) =

1969 opera by Tom Phillips, Fred Orton and Gavin Bryars

Irma is a 1969 experimental opera by artists Tom Phillips, Fred Orton and Gavin Bryars.

The score involved 93 random phrases taken from the 1892 novel A Human Document by W.H. Mallock, which Phillips had reworked in a 'treated' version, A Humument. They were then divided up into sound suggestions, a libretto and staging directions.

The score was completed in 1969. It was then published in the French avant garde poetry magazine O.U. The opera itself had its premiere at the Bordeaux Festival in 1970. It has been performed sporadically since then, including the University of Newcastle in 1972, York University in 1973 and in London in 1983.

A published version of the score was issued in 2014 "providing a recipe book for a stage event; with all the ingredients of traditional opera, dance episodes, drinking chorus, mad scene, erotic enactment, and the many variations on love and death."

== Concept and recording ==
Musician and producer Brian Eno had known Phillips since 1964 as a student at the Ipswich School of Art, where Phillips was an art teacher. Phillips had contributed the cover painting of his landmark release Another Green World. In 1975 Eno had launched Obscure Records, its raison d'etre being the promotion and release of new experimental music. Phillips work and his association with Eno made Obscure a natural home for the piece. Eno suggested that Gavin Bryars could flesh out the score for the recording. In common with much of the releases on Obscure, recording took place at Basing Street Studios in London in February 1977. As usual Eno produced the record and Phil Ault engineered.

The recording and release of the album proved to be fractious. Composer Gavin Bryars took charge of the musical direction of the piece, art writer Fred Orton took Phillips piece and wrote the libretto. Bryars improvised extensively as Phillips's original score was primarily a piece of graphical notation. Phillips had said to Bryars "This is the way I always thought Irma would sound." Bryars remembers thinking "Shit, if you always knew how it was going to sound, why didn't you write it, then?" When the record was released in 1978 it was credited as "Irma An Opera by Tom Phillips" However Bryars was credited with the music and Orton the libretto. Phillips later blamed Eno for letting Bryars dominate the recording, speaking in 2008 he said "Irma was an absolute fucking disaster. It's the one thing I really hold against Brian...He let Gavin steal the piece. The record came out as a piece by Gavin Bryars, which is outrageous when its total derivation is from me."

The album was the ninth release on Obscure Records and had the catalogue number Obscure OBS 9.

== Track listing and personnel ==
1. Introduction
2. Overture And Aria : "I Tell You That's Irma Herself"
3. First Interlude
4. Aria: "Irma You Will Be Mine"
5. Second Interlude
6. Chorus: "Love Is Help Mate"
7. Postlude

=== Personnel ===
- Roy Babbington – bass
- Rory Allam – clarinet
- Rodney Slatford – contrabass
- Dave Smith – horns, vibraphone
- Michael Nyman – piano, marimba, glockenspiel
- John White – tuba, marimba
- Jo Julian – vibraphone, marimba
- Adam Skeaping – alto violin
- Tim Kraemer – baritone violin
- Stuart Deeks – descant violin
- Roddy Skeaping – sopranino violin
- Mark Caudie – tenor violin
- Gavin Wright – treble violin
- Howard Skempton, Lucy Skeaping – vocals
- Angela Bryars, Tom Phillips – chorus

- Gavin Bryars – conductor
- Phil Ault – engineer
- Brian Eno – producer

== Later recording ==
In 1986, Irma was performed at the Serpentine Gallery in London by the improvisational group AMM. This was recorded and released on CD on Matchless Recordings in 1988, catalogue number MRCD16.

Personnel

- Eddie Prévost – percussion
- Keith Rowe – guitar
- John Tilbury – piano, radio
- Ian Mitchell – clarinet
- Lol Coxhill – saxophone, vocals
- Elise Lorraine – vocals
- Phil Minton – vocals
- Tom Phillips – vocals
