= Ring (band) =

English psychedelic rock band

- Nervous Recreation era line up. L–R: Bob, Adrian, Stompy, Johnny Karma, Bic, Ian aka Zag.

Background information
- Origin: London, UK
- Genres: Alternative
- Years active: 1980s

Ring were an English psychedelic rock band active during the 1980s.

The band is notable for having helped to launch the subsequent musical careers of Robert White (Levitation, The Milk And Honey Band), Michael Tubb (also of The Milk And Honey Band) and Christian Hayes (Cardiacs, Levitation, Dark Star, Mikrokosmos).

== Sound and style ==
The band was noted for its diverse music "blending all manner of riffs and noises" and for its band members' tendency to use circus-style face-paint. This sometimes resulted in them being accused of copying Cardiacs, a fellow musical act of the time that had emerged some years previously and were already renowned for their eclectic and unique sound, as well as their manically exaggerated stagecraft and use of face-paint. Commenting on the Zag And The Coloured Beads homepage, one unidentified member or associate of Ring (allegedly singer Jonny Karma) has admitted that Ring's final cassette album, Nervous Recreation, sounded "transparently in awe of Cardiacs."

== History ==
Ring evolved out of the south London experimental rock scene of the 1980s and played frequently at London free festivals of the time. The band released three cassette albums and had a shifting line-up in which members used a variety of pseudonyms.

The two consistent core members were Ian "Zag" Faichne (guitar, synthesizer, vocals, percussion) and Robert White (bass, synthesizer, vocals and guitar). Other key members included Bronwen Grieves (synthesizer and vocals) and Mick Oynugulos (drums), both of whom played on the first two cassette albums. Michael Tubb contributed to the middle period of Ring activity, playing guitar on the second cassette album (O De Dun Dun). Greaves and Oynuglos left the band before the third cassette album Nervous Recreation, for which White and Zag were joined by a new line-up including Christian "Bic" Hayes (guitar, synthesizer, vocals), Adrian (percussion) and Stompy and Jonny Karma (vocals).

It is not precisely recorded when Ring came to an end, but it seems likely that the band petered out in 1990 following White and Hayes' recruitment into Levitation—a band with much more music industry interest (and consequently larger demands regarding time and commitment) than their other projects.

== Musical connections and further activity ==
Ring had a longstanding connection with Zag And The Coloured Beads with whom they shared three members at various times (Ian Faichne, Robert White, and Michael Tubb) and Bing Organ's Beastly Scrapings (two members—Michael Tubb and Rachel Howard) during the middle period.

As previously mentioned, Robert White and Christian Hayes both joined Levitation in 1990, from which Hayes went on to form Dark Star. White later set up The Milk And Honey Band in 1994, in which he was joined by Michael Tubb in 1999.

Roughly parallel to his time with Ring, Christian Hayes was working with The Dave Howard Singers and subsequently Cardiacs. He would also work with Panixsphere, Heather Nova and The Pet Shop Boys. He currently works as a solo artist under the name of Mikrokosmos.

In 2019 and 2023, respectively, O De Dun Dun and Nervous Recreation were digitally reissued in remastered form.

== Pseudonyms ==
In addition to Faichne and Hayes being universally known as "Zag" and "Bic" respectively, Ring members and guest contributors tended to operate under a variety of pseudonyms (in particular when listed in sleevenotes). Here are the pseudonyms used for the main members (pseudonyms used by guests and associates are listed in the Members section below).

- Ian Faichne - a.k.a. "Zag", "ZagRing" or "Zaggo Raggetty Crowman"
- Michael Tubb - a.k.a. "Mik Tubb"
- Robert White - a.k.a. "Bob White", "Bob The Duke Chalky White", "Duke Bob Chalky White"
- Bronwen Greaves - a.k.a. "Bronisynthi" or "BronWen Greavsy"
- Mick Oynugulos - ak.a. "Micky"
- Adrian Barker - a.k.a. "Flat Hat"

== List of members ==
- Ian "Zag" Faichne - guitar, synthesizers, vocals, percussion
- Robert White - bass, synthesizers, voice, percussion, guitar
- Mick Oynugulos - drums, percussion, voice (Demo Tape No. 1 October 1984, O De Dun Dun)
- Bronwen Greaves - synthesizers, voice (Demo Tape No. 1 October 1984, O De Dun Dun)
- "John-a-gram" - saxophone, voice (Demo Tape No. 1 October 1984)
- "Steve Ring" - guitar, percussion, voice (Demo Tape No. 1 October 1984)
- "Rory Cavity Store" - vocals (Demo Tape No. 1 October 1984
- "Adrian" - percussion (Demo Tape No. 1 October 1984, Nervous Recreation), drums Nervous Recreation)
- "Taff Swansea" - percussion (O De Dun Dun - possibly a pseudonym for Andrew Gooding)
- Rachel Howard - vocals (O De Dun Dun)
- Michael "Mik" Tubb - guitar (O De Dun Dun)
- "Big Ron" - electronic drums (O De Dun Dun)
- "Mr Timothy Whiskers" - vocals (O De Dun Dun)
- Christian "Bic" Hayes - guitar, synthesizers, voice (Nervous Recreation)
- "Matt" - guitar (Nervous Recreation)
- "Tom" - drums (Nervous Recreation)
- "Mark" - keyboards (Nervous Recreation)
- "Jonny Karma" - vocals (Nervous Recreation)
- "Stompy" - vocals (Nervous Recreation)
- "Trog A.K.A. Trogledyte Cave-Dweller" - synthesizers

== Albums ==
- Demo Tape No. 1 October 1984 (1984) (cassette-only album)
- O De Dun Dun (1986) (cassette & archival digital reissue/remaster)
- Nervous Recreation (1989) (cassette & archival digital reissue/remaster)
