= The Dave Howard Singers =

Canadian musical group

- Origin: Toronto, Ontario, Canada
- Genres: Alternative rock, indie rock
- Years active: 1981–1992, 2007-present
- Members: Dave Howard
- Past members: Pat Aherne; Martin Heath; Nick Smash; Bernadette Keeffe; Simon Walker; T. Daniel Howard; Christian Hayes; Kev Hopper; Bevin Burke; Anand Gary "Subs" Subassa "Max" "Wendy" "Sarah"

The Dave Howard Singers is a cult Canadian alternative rock band/project originally formed in Toronto, Ontario, Canada. The project is based around the talents of singer-songwriter Dave Howard (the only consistent member) and the signature sound of his Ace Tone organ. During the second half of the 1980s, the band were resident in (and drew many members from) Britain, where they were a cult act making several appearances on nationwide television.

Howard's work is noted for its mixture of eccentric humour and sincerity, and its persistent attempts to marry extremely disparate and clashing elements of light popular music (lounge-pop tunes, crooner vocals) and industrial/electronic avant-garde music (rapid electronic rhythms, noise, screaming). Howard's vigorous stagecraft and highly emotional performance style has led him to be described as a "surreal revolutionary", "a vaudeville entertainer for the post-apocalyptic age" and "damned irresponsible and depraved". His songs have been described as "evoking a singular world both comforting and cruel." Howard himself has admitted "I've always had a passion for exploring extreme emotions, especially in my work. Extremely deranged, delighted, demented, deluded, you name it."

== Early years (1979–1984) ==
An ex-student of the Royal Conservatory of Ontario, Dave Howard started his musical career in Toronto in 1979, as part of a post-punk band called The Diner's Club (also featuring drummer Boris Rosych and guitarist Brian Ruryk). Howard noted later "we were into all that stuff out of New York like Teenage Jesus and the Jerks, DNA, The Contortions and of course Suicide. I also liked the clean minimalism of groups like Young Marble Giants. And just to totally confuse you, a tiny portion from my list of early influences would be Burt Bacharach, The Beatles, John Barry, early Genesis, Bernard Hermann, Holst, Debussy, and Dean Martin."

Striking out as a solo act in 1981 (accompanied by a drum machine called "Max"), Howard took on the ironic project name of The Dave Howard Singers - despite the fact that not only was he the only singer in the group, but also the only member. Drawing principally on his Suicide and Burt Bacharach influences, he performed song-sets mingling rapid electronic rhythms and noise with lounge-friendly pop tunes and crooner vocals. Audiences confused by this mixture–apart from those who were implacably hostile–were won over by Howard's sense of humour and encouragement of audience participation (he would invite them to sing along, heckle and tell stories as part of his concert experience). While Toronto-based, he supported international music acts such as James Chance and the Contortions, The Psychedelic Furs, and Jah Wobble. The debut Dave Howard Singers release was the 8-song cassette album Alone And Gone in 1983, followed by the cassette EP A Loan And A Yawn.

== The London years (late 1984–1986) ==
In October 1984, British keyboard player and producer Dave Formula (Magazine, Visage) was brought in by Howard's manager Peter Noble to produce Howard's recordings. Formula persuaded Howard and Noble that if Howard was serious about a musical career, he should relocate to Britain. Following Formula's advice, Howard moved to London and was teamed up with ex-Howard Devoto sidemen Pat Aherne (drums) and Martin Heath (bass, formerly of The Poison Girls) to form a live trio. This line-up recorded the Whoishe? EP, including the live favourite (and Mad Max tribute) "Road Warrior", which was released on Howard's own label Hallelujah! Records (via Rough Trade). However, Howard soon became dissatisfied with the musical direction he was being groomed for. Following a WOMAD gig in 1985 at which he had been presented (semi-ironically) as Canada's musical representative, Howard parted company with Formula, Aherne and Heath.

The day after WOMAD, Howard teamed up with fellow Canadian Nick Smash, a stand-up drummer and "heavy percussionist" who'd previously worked with Rent Boys Inc. The new-look Dave Howard Singers made an appearance on The Tube, toured with Shock Headed Peters and supported Sonic Youth in Amsterdam.

The Dave Howard Singers followed up Whoishe? with the live-in-concert EP Goodnight Karl Malden EP, recorded in winter 1985 in the Netherlands and released in March 1986. To promote the EP, The Dave Howard Singers pulled off a considerable press coup by playing a bizarre free concert (assisted by slide and video projections) at the London Canadian Embassy (Canada House) in April 1986. Howard posed, tongue-in-cheek, as a cultural representative (much as he had at WOMAD in 1985) and delivered a noisy set. Described as "the loudest launch reception for a record ever witnessed", the concert was a great cult success and was covered by (among others) Melody Maker, Sounds and New Musical Express.

In October 1986, The Dave Howard Singers released a cover version of the David Essex hit "Rock On" (produced by The Stranglers' JJ Burnel). This was described at the time as "frighteningly minimalist" and as "ruffian unrest". Even as recently as 2004, the single was described in retrospect as "mutated… beyond all recognition, with Max providing heavy duty electro beats, Nick Smash beating the shit out of his tom-toms and Dave screaming his lungs out (through) a convoluted series of sections before finally degenerating into full-on insanity, with Dave screeching a tirade of obscenities." Howard made much of the initial friction between himself and Burnel (the latter a committed DHS fan) during the recording session ("It all got off to a tempestuous start. On the first day I was so uptight and made him uptight, so he threatened me with my life. I was thinking, God, this isn't how it should be working out. Then, after the air was cleared, it all worked out fine.")

Smash left the band the day before the Rock On video was to be shot, having clashed with manager Peter Noble and claiming to be "getting pretty sick of that Ace Tone". He would later patch up his personal relationship with Howard, although he would not return to the band.

== The London years (1987–1992) ==
Still using the "Dave Howard Singers" project name, Howard continued as a solo performer (accompanied by the ever-faithful Max). He released the "quasi-hip-hop" single "Yon Yonson" (based on an American nonsense rhyme) in 1987, immediately following it up with a disco remix called "Yon Yonson Meets Dr R-R-Ruth" (which spliced the original single with "crackpot sex therapy out-takes").

By May 1988, Howard had recruited singers Wendy and Sarah to provide live backing vocals for him. In November 1988, The Dave Howard Singers supported Spacemen 3. By this point, Howard's onstage stunts including placing his Ace Tone organ on a wheelchair rather than a keyboard stand (while in Canada, he had often sat in a wheelchair to play the organ). Bernadette Keeffe (of The Happy End Big Band and The Ectomorph) sang with him for about a year during which, in early 1989, the 12" single "What Do You Say To An Angel?" (inspired by an unprovoked attack on Howard by a Hell's Angel) with flipside "Sabata '88", was released on Pinpoint Records. Steve Bolton (Atomic Rooster) was brought in on electric and acoustic guitars for the recording. The line-up of the Dave Howard Singers changed again with the addition of "guitar alchemist" Simon Walker, who in turn had brought in T. Daniel Howard (drums). The band became a quartet with the addition of bass player Christian "Bic" Hayes (ex-Ring), whose additional unicycling and juggling skills had endeared him to Howard.

Bic would eventually leave The Dave Howard Singers to play guitar with Cardiacs, and was later known for his membership of first Levitation and subsequently Dark Star. He was temporarily replaced by Stump bassist Kev Hopper. Later in 1989, Simon Walker also left The Dave Howard Singers when he was recruited by The House Of Love to replace the infamous Terry Bickers (who himself was shortly to join another ex-DHS member, Bic, in Levitation). Regarding the poaching of Walker, Howard was later to comment, with regret, "It was a sad day... You know, it's just me but I don't think they made full use of him. Pity."

The band reorganised as a trio of Dave Howard, T. Daniel Howard and new bass player Bevin Burke. With a new recording contract signed with the Ghetto Recording Company, this lineup recorded the single "All My Relatives Look The Same" (released in 1990) and the long-awaited Dave Howard Singers debut album It's About Time (1991) which was produced by Paul "Thwack" Laventhol (the former King Kurt guitarist, and Dave Howard's neighbour). Later on in 1991, Burke was replaced on bass by Anand Gary Subassa (a.k.a. "Subs") and the band undertook a tour of Europe, frequently playing at squat parties. However, the band's progress was damaged when Ghetto Recording Company folded at the time of the album release (part of the general malaise hitting the British music industry at the time). Consequently, It's About Time was only released in Germany (apart from an unusual release in Canada for which the band operated under the name of Devoured and the album was released under the title 13).

By early 1992, a disaffected Dave Howard had spent eight years on the margins of the British music industry only to have his hopes dashed by bad luck. Taking stock of the situation, he dissolved the band, quit music and moved back to Canada. He has also cited "the fact that certain family members weren't gettin' any younger and didn't have family close by to look out for them" as affecting his decision.

== Back in Canada (1992–2006) ==
Back in Toronto, Howard was soon coaxed out of retirement to play with Paul Laventhol (who'd also moved to Canada) in a burlesque band which also featured drummer Keith "Keef" McGuinness. Laventhol's time in Canada was fairly short, and once he had returned to the UK Howard and McGuinness became the duo Me And Keith (which played two concerts, a year apart). After the end of this project, Howard retired his Ace Tone organ and retreated to the studio to write music for Canada's Global Television Network. He subsequently became Audio Director of the multimedia production company Chromacide and went on to write music for cartoons, commercials, websites and animations.

== The return of the Dave Howard Singers (2007–present) ==
On April 7, 2007, the original lineup of The Dave Howard Singers (Howard and Max) reconvened to play at Mitzi's Sister, Toronto. The project have performed several gigs since then. Apparently reinvigorated by his live activity, Howard has re-released his first four UK EPs (Whoishe?, Goodnight Karl Malden, Rock On, Yon Yonson) as a compilation CD called What Your Girlfriend Threw Out, Or Your Friend Never Returned. They continue to perform live, however, only when the occasion is justified. On Monday, November 12, 2012, at the Wrongbar in Toronto, The Dave Howard Singers opened for Lydia Lunch.

In late 2023 Dave Howard released an album under the name The Dave Howard Singularity, "Dark and For Boating."

== Discography ==
=== Albums ===
- Alone And Gone (1983, self-released cassette album)
- It’s About Time (1991, Ghetto Recording Company, Germany-only – also released in Canada as Devoured album 13)
- Dark & For Boating (under the name The Dave Howard Singularity, 2023, Smash Records)

=== Singles and EPs ===
- A Loan And A Yawn (1983, self-released cassette EP)
- Whoishe? EP (1985, Hallelujah! Records) (UK Indie No. 39)
- Goodnight Karl Malden EP (1986, Hallelujah! Records)
- "Rock On" (1986, Fun After All Records)
- Yon Yonson (1987, Hallelujah! Records) (UK Indie No. 4)
- Yon Yonson Meets Dr R-R-Ruth (1987, Hallelujah! Records)
- "Chances" (1988, Pinpoint)
- What Do You Say To An Angel? (1989, Pinpoint Records)
- All My Relatives Look The Same (1990, Ghetto Recording Company)

=== Compilations ===
- You Bet We've Got Something Against You (1985, Cathexis Recordings): Features "I Am A Bunny".
- Funky Alternatives II (1986. Concrete Productions): Features "Yon Yonson III".
- On The Dotted Line (Here) (1987, EMI): Features "The Murder Of Your Smile" and "Plastic Horse".
- On The Dotted Line...(There) (1987, EMI): Features "Beat Box Baby".
- What Your Girlfriend Threw Out, Or Your Friend Never Returned (2007, DHS - compiles the four EPs Whoishe?, Goodnight Karl Malden, Rock On, Yon Yonson)
- SMASH ON (2017. SMASH): Features "The Killing Time".
- Control I'm Here (Adventures On The Industrial Dancefloor 1983-1990) (2024, Cherry Red): Features "Yon Yonson".

== See also ==
- Music of Canada
- Canadian rock
- List of Canadian musicians
- List of bands from Canada
- Category:Canadian musical groups
