= Carrie (band) =

- Label: Island Records

Carrie were a British-based rock music band, featuring the former Levitation and Some Have Fins singer/guitarist Steve Ludwin, ex-EMF bass player Zac Foley, guitarist Dennis Dicker, and Australian drummer, Bruce Pawsey. Their sound was characterised by a juxtaposition of glossy production and multi-layered harmonies with often dark lyrical material. The band's name derived from the Star Wars actress, Carrie Fisher.

The band evolved from another North London band called Pura Vida, with John Plunkett as guitarist, Simon Davies (formerly of Manchester band The High) as bassist and keyboard player Sammie Cannon. Under that name, they released two EPs on the EMI-funded label Org Records circa 1996 – "Sister Was Sick" and "Vivien". After limited success, Pura Vida disbanded and Pawsey and Ludwin reformed as Carrie with Foley replacing Davies on bass and with Max La Via and then Dennis Dicker on guitar. The band signed to Island Records in 1997 but released their debut single "Birds" independently. Cannon was apparently sacked from the band during this period.

Carrie released a number of singles including "Birds", "Molly", 'Breathe Underwater" and the minor hit "California Screamin'", all of which appeared on the 1998 album Fear of Sound. Despite extensive touring throughout the UK and Europe in 1998, the band's demise came in late 1999 when they were dropped by Island records and EMI publishing. In 2001, Foley returned to the reformed EMF, and Ludwin and Dicker left to form Little Hell.

== UK chart singles ==
- "Breathe Underwater" (1997) – UK No. 99
- "Molly" (1998) – UK No. 56
- "California Screamin'" (1998) – UK No. 55
