= Zag and the Coloured Beads =

English experimental rock band

Zag And The Coloured Beads are an English experimental rock band.

Blending elements of psychedelic rock and progressive rock, the band were initially active in the 1980s London free-festival scene and featured several members who went on to subsequent projects including Ring, Levitation and The Milk And Honey Band. Splitting up in 1990, the band eventually reformed in 2006 with a different lineup.

== Sound and influences ==
The band's singer/guitarist Steve Arthur remembers that Zag And The Coloured Beads "evolved pretty much independently, as a band who played complicated tunes in a ragged/bluesy style." Music sometimes "emerged out of jamming, noodling, wandering in the evenings and varied loitering." The band have cited Captain Beefheart, Frank Zappa, Cardiacs, Philip Glass and Can as central influences over the years, "mixed up with all sorts of post-punk albums of the time (Return Of The Duritti Column, Marquee Moon, Wilder by Teardrop Explodes, Killing Joke....)" as well as "old jazz, Trumpton music, plus all the usual Mojo reader's old records."

== History ==
Zag And The Coloured Beads were formed in Croydon and began playing live in 1982 (although demo tapes had been recorded as far back as 1979). The band initially featured frontman Zag (real name Ian Faichne), who departed in 1983 to form Ring. The most familiar lineup was Steve Arthur (vocals and guitars), Michael "Mik" Tubb (guitar, bass, synthesizer, vocals), Paul Howard (bass, guitar, vocals), Robert White (bass, keyboards, vocals), and Tom Rosenbloom (drums). The instrumentation was flexible, with plenty of instrument-swapping both live and on record. The band occasionally also played under pseudonyms such as Ming And The Fods.

For the members, the band was just one of several ongoing projects. Tubb and Howard also played in Bing Organ's Beastly Scrapings; White played in Ring; both White and Howard played in jazz-rock band Peru; and all members bar Tubb occasionally played in the Purple People Eaters.

Zag And The Coloured Beads recorded their first cassette album, Loaf of Legs during 1984 and 1985, using a portastudio. The followup, 1987's Sawtooth Gripmaster saw the band adding eight-track recording capabilities.

Robert White departed in late 1988 to concentrate on Ring and subsequently Levitation and The Milk And Honey Band (he would eventually be joined in the latter by Tubb). Paul Howard left in 1989 and the band continued for a while as a trio of Steve Arthur, Mik Tubb and Tom Rosenbloom.

== Wryneck ==
The remaining band members gradually became another band, 'Wryneck'.

Steve Arthur recalls "without Paul to share bass duties with Mik, we stopped swapping instruments around... Initially I wanted to get away from the Beads' jokiness, and be taken seriously, ma-a-n, so in (came) a mixture of more straightforward rock, woozy atmospheres and non-specific angst. This was the era of shoegazing, Dinosaur Jr. and Snub TV. Plus I saw Levitation doing very well with these huge, intense songs. That was definitely a kick up the backside, though I was caught between wanting to copy them and wanting to be utterly different. "There was a group we knew called The Belltower who were an influence too - really driving psychedelic power pop. As time wore on and Levitation burned out, our love of reliable old faves like Led Zep, James Brown etc. came more to the fore. Re. the latter, even with the rhythm section on top form (and it was) funk is difficult for a trio to do well - it needs other instruments. We drafted in Leisurely on bongos, but sadly the Hammonds, horns and backing vocals stayed in our imaginations."

Wryneck continued until 1993 and recorded two cassette albums. Wryneck (1990) and Instant Confidence (1993). Various lineups of the band continued to work sporadically until 1998.

As of 2019, Wryneck has reformed with a lineup comprising Steve Arthur (guitar, vocals), Paul Howard (guitar), Mik Tubb (bass), Rick Barker (drums, vocals) and Simon Beck (electric piano, organ, synth, Stylophone).

== Zag And The Coloured Beads reunion, and subsequent events ==
Steve Arthur, Michael Tubb and Paul Howard reformed Zag And The Coloured Beads in 2006 with new members James Larcombe (keyboards, from Stars In Battledress and North Sea Radio Orchestra) and Keith Roche (drums). In 2007, Roche was replaced by Paul "Helocolin" Johnson. To date, the revived band has not released any new recordings, although both Loaf of Legs and Sawtooth Gripmaster were reissued as CD albums to sell at live concerts.

Zag and the Coloured Beads gigs remained intermittent, happening more or less at the whim of the band. A typically lively band set can be seen in Nick Booth's 2009 film "Hollow Legs", during which they perform "Bernard Crapshit", a song Mik Tubb wrote in 1986 about the actor Bernard Cribbins. The end credits erroneously refer to the song as "A Loaf of Legs", which was the name of the band's first album.

During this time, Mik Tubb also worked with the Croydon-based band Junk Time Pate, and discussed the formation of a new band with Paul Howard (called Mik Tubb's Military Pickle).

Mik Tubb died on 13 December 2022.

== Members ==
- Steve Arthur - guitar, vocals
- Michael "Mik" Tubb - guitar, bass, synthesizer, vocals (died 13 December 2022)
- Ian "Zag" Faichne - guitar, bass, keyboards, vocals (1982–1984)
- Paul Howard - bass, guitar, vocals (1985–1989, 2006–present)
- Tom Rosenbloom - drums (1982–1987)
- Robert White - bass, keyboards, vocals (1985–1988)
- James Larcombe - keyboards (2006–present)
- Keith Roche - drums (2006–2007)
- Paul Johnson - drums (2007–present)

== Discography ==
- Loaf of Legs (1985 cassette album, reissued on CD 2006)
- Sawtooth Gripmaster (1987 cassette album, reissued on CD 2006)
