= Bic Hayes =

English rock guitarist (born 1964)

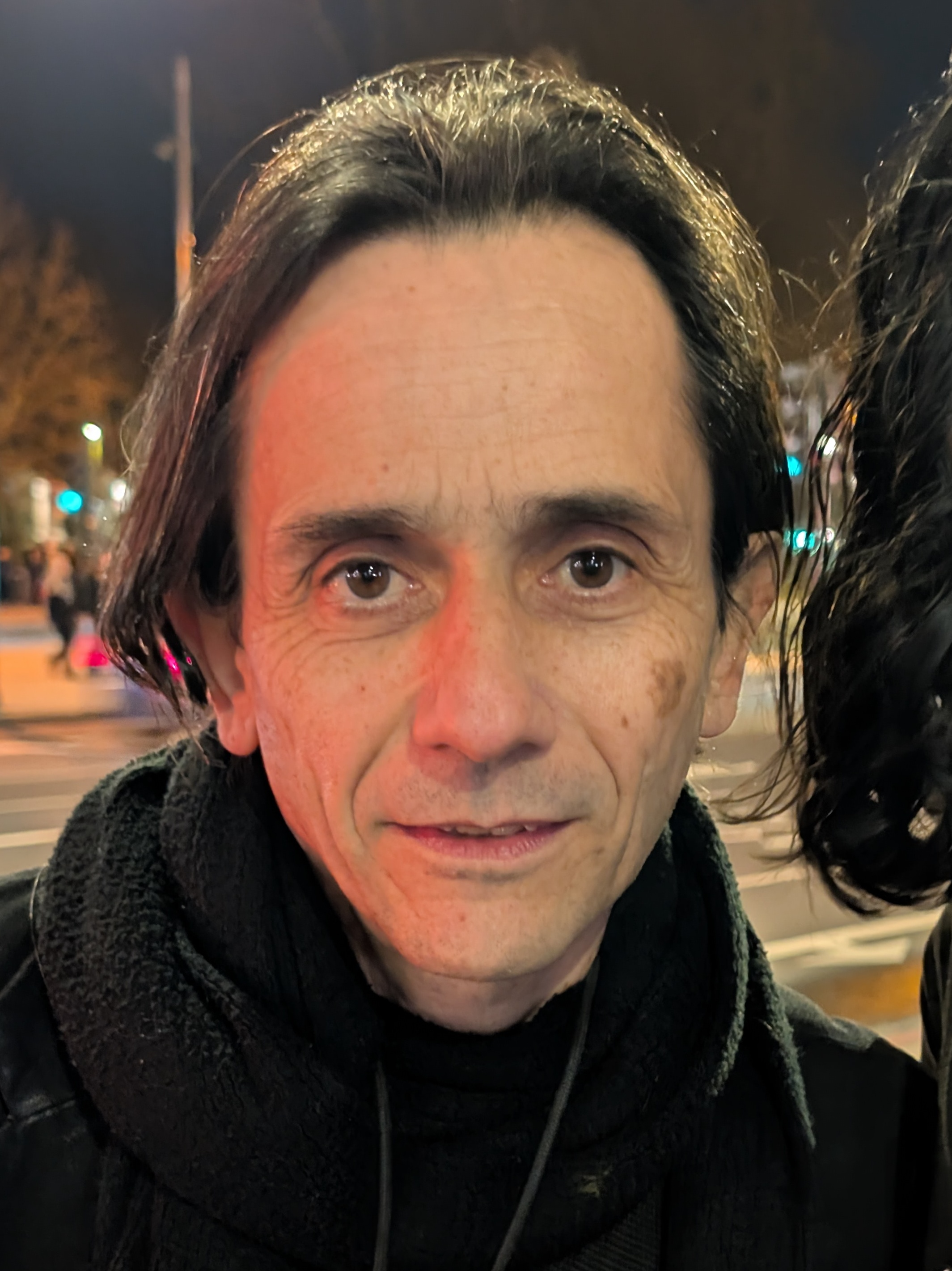
- Hayes in 2026

Background information
- Born: Christian David Hayes; 10 June 1964 (age 62); Westminster, London, England
- Genres: Alternative rock; indie rock; psychedelic rock
- Occupations: Musician; singer; songwriter
- Instruments: Guitar; vocals; bass guitar; keyboards; synthesizer; drums
- Years active: 1983–present
- Member of: Panixphere; Mikrokosmos; ZOFFF; MUMMY
- Formerly of: Ring; The Dave Howard Singers; Cardiacs; Levitation; Mice; Dark Star
- Partner: Jo Spratley

Christian David "Bic" Hayes (Note: Written "Heyes" in a 2020 Louder Than War article) (born 10 June 1964) is an English rock guitarist, singer and songwriter. Best known as the frontman of Dark Star and guitarist with Levitation. Hayes joined Cardiacs as the band's second guitarist from 1989 to 1991. The concert film All That Glitters Is a Mares Nest and the album Heaven Born and Ever Bright were recorded before Hayes left the band and released in 1992. Hayes has released solo material as Mikrokosmos. (Note: Styled as mikrokosmos, in italics and all lowercase)

Hayes explained that he was nicknamed Bic because he "just stopped eating for ages and people started saying I looked like a Bic biro. I had this phase when I thought eating was boring".

== Career ==
Christian David Hayes was born on 10 June 1964 in London. Hayes' first band, the live thrash band Panixphere (also written as Panixsphere), formed in 1983.

By 1988, Hayes was playing guitar with psychedelic rock band Ring, moving on to become bass player with The Dave Howard Singers in 1989. In the same year he joined Cardiacs as second guitarist, replacing departing saxophonist Sarah Smith. Hayes appeared as part of the band on their 1992 concert film All That Glitters Is a Mares Nest (in which Tim Smith refers to him as a woman). Heaven Born and Ever Bright, recorded before Hayes left the band, was released in 1992.

Hayes had come to know former House of Love guitarist Terry Bickers through musical friends in South London. During 1990, Bickers invited Hayes to join himself and drummer David Francolini in a new project which evolved into indie-psychedelic rock band Levitation (and into which Hayes recruited his former Ring bandmate, Robert White). Initially Hayes divided his time between Cardiacs and Levitation, but as the latter rapidly gained more and more attention from British audiences and the British music press, he found it difficult to accommodate both bands. He left Cardiacs (somewhat reluctantly) in May 1991, admitting "they were the band I left for Levitation. I loved Cardiacs and thought they were the best band in Britain at the time. That's how much I believed in Levitation. The chemistry was explosive". Hayes subsequently reformed Panixphere with Francolini and Cardiacs members Tim Smith and Jon Poole.

Following the demise of Levitation in 1993, Hayes worked with Heather Nova and then with former All About Eve frontwoman Julianne Regan in a band called Mice. In 1996, he reunited with former Levitation bandmates David Francolini and Laurence O'Keefe to form Dark Star. Having released their debut album Twenty Twenty Sound in 1999, the band recorded a second album but it was not released as a result of personnel changes at their record company. An unmastered seven track version of the album, omitting the tracks "Roman Road" and "Valentine", was leaked within a couple of years of the split. Titled Zurich, it is unconfirmed whether this was an official title. The album remains unreleased, though Hayes has stated his hope to release the second album soon.

On the C86 Show Hayes discussed the circumstances around the demise of Dark Star, with a fully recorded second album (originally titled Zurich, then …out flew reason) archived following a change of A&R personnel at their label. Following the disbanding of Dark Star in 2001, Hayes toured with the Pet Shop Boys and worked as a guitar tech/tour/production manager for the likes of My Bloody Valentine, Kula Shaker and David Cassidy. In 2007, Hayes began releasing archive releases of previously unreleased solo material (recording during and shortly after his time with Levitation) under the name of Mikrokosmos via Ingatia Recordings. A trio of releases -In The Heart of the Home, The Seven Stars and Terra Familiar - have been issued.

In 2011, Hayes organised and compiled the tribute record Leader of the Starry Skies in aid of Cardiacs frontman Tim Smith (who had suffered two strokes in 2008 which left him paralysed down one side of his body and unable to speak). He also toured with a stage version of Macbeth in 2011 and 2012, produced by Platform 4 and described as "a taut psychodrama that crackles with a wild electricity, brought alive by the sonic experiments of composer and guitarist Bic Hayes and sound designer Jules Bushel".

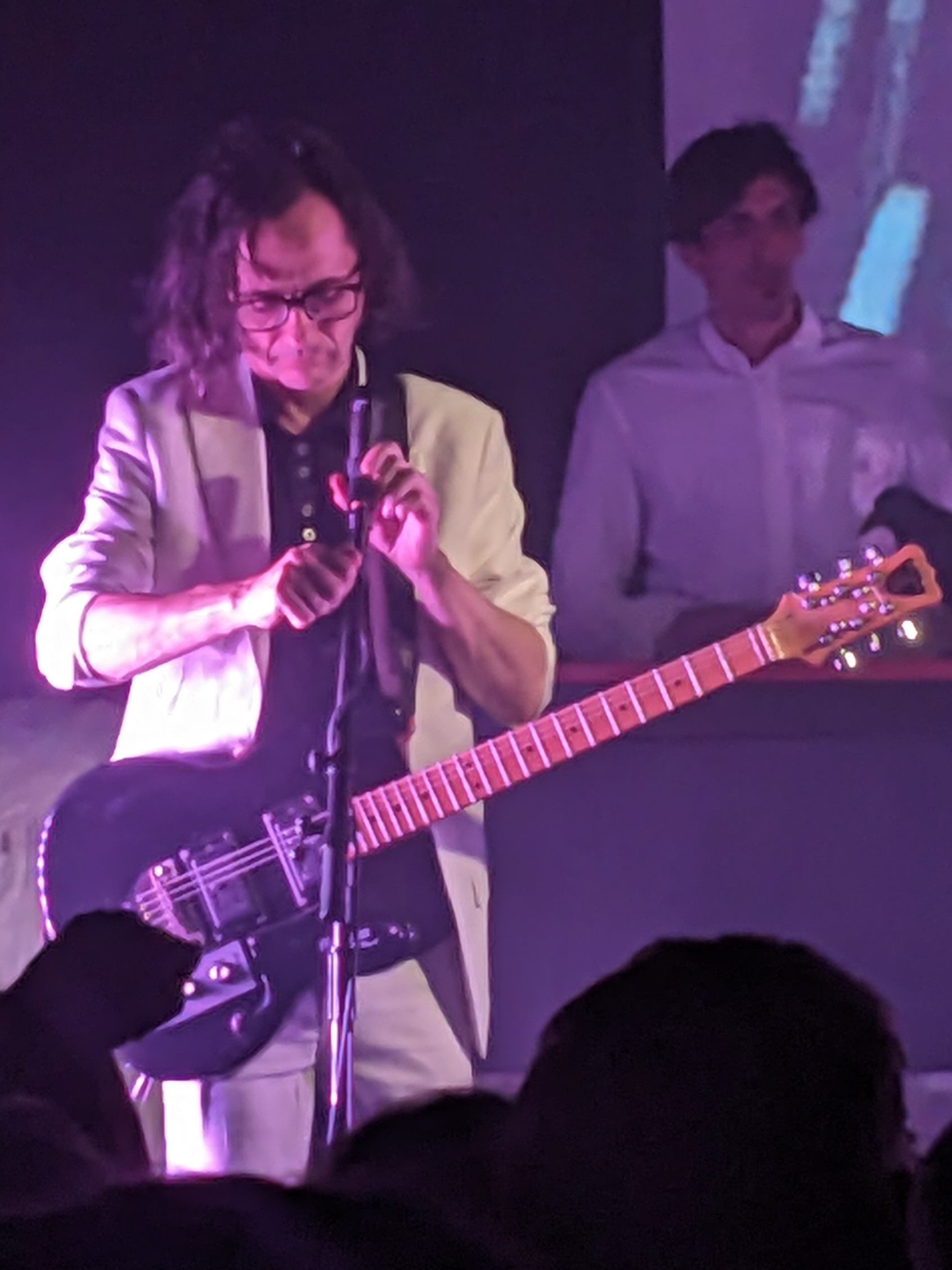
Hayes with Cardiacs Family in 2024

More recently Hayes has been involved in the Brighton-based improvisational instrumental psychedelic band ZOFFF (previously known as Light Specific Data or LSD-25) and with MUMMY (a duo with his partner, the singer Jo Spratley). Panixphere reformed as a trio in 2019 featuring Hayes, Poole and Cardiacs drummer Bob Leith, releasing a live split single with Spratleys Japs via Hayes' label The Confinement Tapes in 2020. In 2024, Bic Hayes provided vocals and guitar for Cardiacs Family, featuring former members of Cardiacs.

== Discography ==
=== With Cardiacs ===
- "Day Is Gone" single (1991)
- Heaven Born and Ever Bright (1992)
- All That Glitters is a Mares Nest (1992)

As Mikrokosmos

- In the Heart of the Home (2007)
- The Seven Stars (2008)
- Terra Familiar (2014)

=== Other credits ===
Title	Year	Artist	Notes
Nervous Recreation	1989	Ring	Guitar, synth, voice
"Wheres Herne Bay?"	1994	Pinhead Nation	Producer
"Shock Giro"	1995	Pinhead Nation	Producer
Disco 3	2003	Pet Shop Boys	Guitars on "If Looks Could Kill" (with Mark Refoy)
Market Harbour	2008	Ginger	Backing vocals (with Ginger, Denzel, Jase Edwards, Tim Smith, Chris Catalyst, Scott Sorry, CJ, Dick Decent, Lee Small, Joanne Spratley, Tracie Hunter and Phoebe White)
Leader of the Starry Skies: A Tribute to Tim Smith, Songbook 1	2010	Various artists	Producer (with Jo Spratley)
Luck Had Nothing to Do with It	2012	Pinhead Nation	Production, mixing, editing, backing vocals, keyboards (tracks 9 and 11) and hand claps
Release: Further Listening 2001–2004	2017	Pet Shop Boys	Guitars on "A Powerful Friend", "If Looks Could Kill (John Peel version)" and "If Looks Could Kill" (with Mark Refoy)
"Her" / "Hands"	2018	Spratleys Japs	Mixing, sneaky additional guitar
Happy Endings	2018	Crayola Lectern	Electric guitar on "Lingeron", "Lux", "(No More) Happy Endings", and "Finale"
Disastermoon	2025	Crayola Lectern	Electric guitar solos on "Disastermoon" and "Coscoroba", additional mixing on "Disastermoon" with Damo Waters
Pyromancy	2026	Furii	Backing vocals on "Wizle" (with Jesse Cutts, Adrien Rodes and Marie Rendina)
Bloom	2026	Spratleys	Lead singing on "Bloom" and "Nancy", choir duties on "Jade" and "Gold Place" (with Jim Smith, Jon Poole, Bob Leith, Mike Vennart, Craig Fortnam, Chloe Herington, Matthew Cutts, Jesse Cutts and Emily Jones)
