= Jan Jansen (historian) =

Dutch historian and anthropologist

Dr. Jan Jansen (born 1962) of Leiden University, Netherlands, is a historian and anthropologist specialising in the oral history of sub-Saharan Africa, particularly Mali.

Jansen is the managing editor of History in Africa, the journal of the African Studies Association. He is also a founding editor of Mande Worlds, published by LIT Verlag, Munster/Hamburg, and African Sources for African History, published by Brill, Leiden.

== Selected publications ==
- L'Épopée de Sunjara, d'après Lansine Diabate de Kela. Leiden: Research School CNWS, 1995. (with E. Duintjer and B. Tamboura).
- The Griot's Craft – An Essay on Oral Tradition and Diplomacy. Műnster-Hamburg: LIT Verlag, 2000.
- Epopée Histoire Société – Le cas de Soundjata (Mali-Guinée). Paris: Karthala, 2001. [French edition of 1995 dissertation]).

== See also ==
- Oral history in modern Mali
