= Fred Orton =

Fred Lionel Orton (born 1945, Coventry, Warwickshire England; died 15 February 2025) was an English art historian. His initial training was at Coventry College of Art in painting as a Dip.A.D student. He extended his experience in the History and Development of Art initially at the Courtauld Institute in London and then professionally as a scholar of art history and art theory at the University of Leeds.

== Scholarship ==
Orton published an influential essay in 1991 in the Oxford Art Journal that argued that Harold Rosenberg, the critic who coined the term "Action painting", developed the concept as a result of his commitment to Marxism rather than to the photographs of Jackson Pollock in action. According to art critic Stephen Moonie, Orton's essay was one of the first attempts to define the term, offering a "political reading" which, "as Orton shows with great diligence", was a continued effort in Rosenberg's career. With Griselda Pollock he wrote Avant-Gardes and Partisans Reviewed and Vincent van Gogh: Artist of his Time. A social historian of art, he is influenced by Marxist theory. His 1994 book Figuring Jasper Johns investigated the relationship between Jasper Johns and Frank O'Hara.

Orton is also one of the editors of a collection on the Ruthwell and Bewcastle crosses, and with Catherine Karkov edited an important collection on Anglo-Saxon stone sculpture; he contributed one essay, and three other essays are responses to his.

== Books published ==
- Vincent van Gogh: Artist of his Time (London: Phaidon, 1978)
- Figuring Jasper Johns (London: Reaktion, 1994)
- Avant-Gardes and Partisans Reviewed (with Griselda Pollock; Manchester University Press, 1996)
- Theorizing Anglo-Saxon Stone Sculpture Medieval European Studies 4. (Morgantown: West Virginia University Press, 2003, edited with Catherine Karkov)
- Fragments of History: Rethinking the Ruthwell and Bewcastle Monuments (Manchester University Press, 2007, with Ian N. Wood and Clare Lees)
- Aesthetic Thinking: Essays on Intention, Painting, Action, and Ideology (Brill, 2022)

=== Selected articles ===
Orton, F. (1991). "Action, Revolution and Painting". Oxford Art Journal. 14 (2): 3–17. doi:10.1093/oxartj/14.2.3.; republished in Orton and Pollock, Avant-Gardes and Partisans Reviewed, 3-17.
