= The Milk and Honey Band =

English rock band

The Milk and Honey Band are an English rock band formed by singer, songwriter and multi-instrumentalist Robert White (ex-Ring, Levitation and Zag And The Coloured Beads).

== Sound ==
The music of The Milk and Honey Band is a mixture of pastoral English psychedelic rock, accessible acoustic pop songwriting and space rock, with plentiful use of acoustic guitars and banked vocal harmonies plus extended melodic lead guitar and atmospheric production. XTC's Andy Partridge has described them as "a bit like The Moody Blues but with more energy and better songs. Or at times like a blissful Who.".

== History ==
=== Building a full band (1996–2000) ===
Following the collapse of Levitation, White relocated to Brighton and pursued a steady career in commercial music production, while simultaneously building up a stock of Milk and Honey Band songs for future release. In 1996, he presented Rough Trade with material for a new album but found that the label was unable to release it.

Opting to put together a full band, White recruited Richard Yale (bass, acoustic guitar, keyboards and backing vocals) and his former Zag and The Coloured Beads bandmate Michael Tubb (electric and acoustic guitars, keyboards and backing vocals). Regarding the band’s working arrangements, White commented "I do write the majority of the tunes, but without Richard and Michael's help this group...well, it wouldn't be a group for starters. They keep me sane and generally massage my ego just enough to keep me buoyed without adding too much to the 'ego mountain that is Robert'. It's a bit like the old it's-my-ball-and-I-say-when-you-can-play-with-it syndrome, but as I happen to be the one lucky enough to have a studio at home then most of the recording/rehearsing activities of The Milk & Honey Band happen here."

=== Return to action (2001 to 2003: Boy From The Moon) ===
Attempts to sign the band to major labels proved unsuccessful due to the latter's insistence on attempting to reshape and direct the band (on one occasion, even attempting to demote White from the position of lead singer). In order to maintain control, White retreated and chose to write and record songs to his own schedule.

The next sign of Milk and Honey Band activity was in 2001 with the release of the Boy From The Moon album on the small Manchester independent label Uglyman Records. A much more polished effort than its predecessor, the record was atmospheric and detailed with a more spacious production sound. Uglyman's resources were limited and the record had difficulty in reaching a wide audience. However, one copy of the album reached XTC singer Andy Partridge, who was setting up his own record label and invited The Milk and Honey Band to sign to it.

=== Ape Records years (2004 to 2010) ===
The Milk and Honey Band signed a distribution deal with Partridge’s label, Ape Records, in 2004 and released a third album The Secret Life Of The Milk And Honey Band. This was in many ways a continuation of the work on the previous album. It contained four reissued songs from Boy From The Moon – the title track, "Sold My Star", "Satellite" and "Junior" (the last of which was retitled "Message").

In March 2009, the band released their fourth full album, Dog Eared Moonlight, on Ape Records.

=== Hiatus, Robert White solo work, and Songs from Truleigh Hill ===
In December 2010, a Robert White cover version of the Sea Nymphs song "Lily White's Party" (recorded in collaboration with Andy Partridge) appeared on Leader Of The Starry Skies: A Tribute To Tim Smith, Songbook 1, a fundraising compilation album to benefit the hospitalised Cardiacs/Sea Nymphs leader Tim Smith. On 13 February 2013, White released a solo cover version of the Gillian Welch song "Everything Is Free" as a video-only single.

In July 2020, Robert White announced the impending release of a new Milk and Honey Band album on social media. The album "Songs from Truleigh Hill" was released on CD, download and ultra-clear vinyl on the independent label Onomatopoeia Records in February 2021.

== Discography ==
=== Albums ===
- Round The Sun (Rough Trade Records, 1994)
- Boy From The Moon (Uglyman Records, 2001)
- The Secret Life Of The Milk And Honey Band (Ape Records, 2004)
- Dog-Eared Moonlight (Ape Records, March 2009)
- In Colour (Ape Records, download only, November 2010)
- Songs From Truleigh Hill (Onomatopoeia Records, February 2021)

=== Singles/EPs ===
- "Boy From The Moon" (Ape Records, 2004 - re-recorded version with Andy Partridge on backing vocals and guitar)
- "Disappear" (Ape Records, February 2009 - download-only single with "Mind", an additional track not off the new album)

=== Compilations ===
- *Crumbs!* Volume One (Ape Records, download only, 2006)
- *Crumbs!* Volume Two (Ape Records, download only, 2006)

== Members ==
=== Current members ===
- Robert White – lead vocals, guitars, keyboards, mandolin, percussion, drums, programming etc. (1993-present)

=== Past members ===
- Richard Yale – bass, acoustic guitar, keyboards and backing vocals (c. 1999-c. 2010)
- Michael "Mik" Tubb – electric and acoustic guitars, keyboards and backing vocals (c. 1999-c. 2010) (died 13 December 2022)
- Dan Burke – keyboards, guitar and backing vocals (2004--c. 2010)
- Christian Parsons – drums (2004--c. 2010)
