= Little Hell, Virginia =

Unincorporated community in Virginia, United States

Coordinates: 37°39′56″N 75°46′36″W

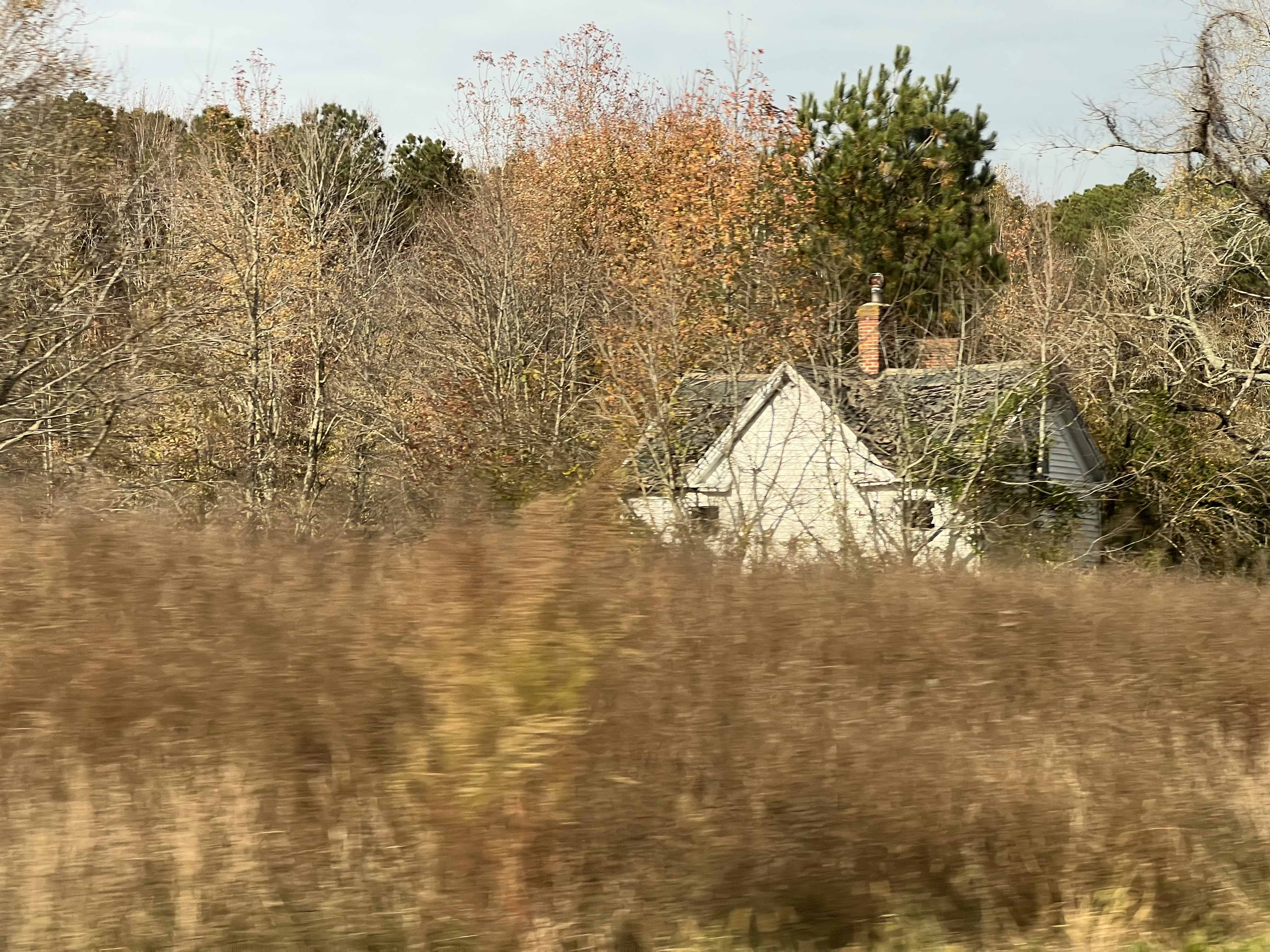
An abandoned house in Little Hell, Virginia.

Little Hell is an unincorporated community in Accomack County, Virginia, United States. The site was named after a 19th-century tavern. A 1996 newspaper story reported that the neighborhood around the tavern had recently consisted of three buildings, but that only one remained by the time the story was written. A residential development named Evergreen was expected to grow in the area.
