= Little Hell (band) =

British rock band

- Origin: London, UK
- Genre: Rock
- Years active: 2001–2004
- Label: Double Dragon
- Spinoff of: Carrie
- Past members: Steve Ludwin; Dennis Dicker; Lucy Johnston; Natasha Moledina; Clive Dicker

Little Hell was a London-based rock band formed in 2001 by former Some Have Fins/Levitation/Carrie singer Steve Ludwin.

== History ==
The band was first formed in 2000 following the demise of Carrie. Ludwin maintained his working relationship with Carrie guitarist Dennis Dicker, but stepped back from his frontman duties, concentrating instead on songwriting and guitar playing. Instead, vocalist Lucy Johnston was recruited as frontwoman and the lineup was completed by bass guitarist Natasha Moledina and drummer Clive Dicker. Little Hell signed to Double Dragon Records and released their first limited edition 7-inch single "Lose It". This was followed up with their first CD single release, "Emotional Vampire Sound", which saw them working with producer Owen Morris (Ash's 1977; Oasis' (What's The Story) Morning Glory?).

When Johnston left the band due to personal differences, Ludwin took over lead vocal and frontman duties. Two further singles were released - "Virus with Shoes" and "Everybody's Cursed". Both were present on the band's debut album Demonic Advisory Centre, released in 2002 and showing a much harder sound than had been evident on the Johnston-era singles. Little Hell toured the album extensively, with support slots with the likes of Placebo, Ween, Amen, Queenadreena, Ash and Gary Numan. The album was not commercially successful and the band split up in 2004. While Ludwin was still with Little Hell, he had auditioned unsuccessfully to be the lead singer for Velvet Revolver.

Following Little Hell's split in 2004, Ludwin moved into songwriting and production. He has been heavily involved in the careers of recent rock acts Betty Curse, The Crimea and Good Shoes, as well as producing an MTV Europe show called "Annoying Americans". He also wrote a song called "Warmer Than Fire" which later became a hit for Ash.

Ludwin was featured in the news internationally in 2016 and 2017 over his research into the effects of daily dosing snake venom and the immune system

== Discography ==
=== Singles/EPs ===
- "Lose It" (2000) (7" Vinyl)
- "Emotional Vampire Sound" EP (2000)
- "Virus with Shoes" (2002)
- "Everybody's Cursed" (2002)
- "Use Your Brain" (2003)

=== Albums ===
- Demonic Advisory Centre (2002)
