= Laurence O'Keefe (rock musician) =

English bassist

- Born: 2 January 1965 (age 60); Newcastle upon Tyne, England
- Origin: Ipswich, Suffolk, England
- Genres: Alternative rock, psychedelic rock
- Occupation: Musician
- Instrument(s): Bass guitar, vocals
- Years active: late 1980s–present

Laurence O'Keefe (born 2 January 1965) is an English bassist, best known as a member of Dark Star and Levitation.

Prior to joining Levitation in 1990, O'Keefe had played with several artists including The Jazz Butcher. Levitation released several EPs and single plus one album, and split in 1994. He reunited with former Levitation bandmates Christian Hayes and David Francolini in 1996 to form Dark Star, who released Twenty Twenty Sound in 1999 before splitting in 2001. He also formed The Hope Blister with Ivo Watts-Russell in 1997.

Following the demise of Dark Star, O'Keefe has continued work as a session musician and toured with the likes of Sophia, Dead Can Dance and Martina Topley-Bird.
