= A Humument =

Altered book by Tom Phillips

- First page of A Humument, 1970 edition
- Author: Tom Phillips
- Illustrator: Tom Phillips
- Language: English
- Genre: Artist's book
- Publisher: Thames & Hudson
- Publication date: 1970
- Publication place: United Kingdom
- Media type: Book
- Pages: 367

A Humument: A Treated Victorian Novel is an altered book by British artist Tom Phillips, published in its first edition in 1970 and completed in 2016. It is a piece of art created over W. H. Mallock's 1892 novel A Human Document whose title results from the partial deletion of the original title: A Hum~~an doc~~ument.

Phillips drew, painted, and collaged over the pages, while leaving some of the original text to show through in the form of erasure. Through this process, A Humument is a new story with a new protagonist named Bill Toge, whose name appears only when the word "together" or "altogether" appears in Mallock's original text. From being created over many decades, it follows a nonlinear narrative, and in recent editions Phillips has rewritten pages to include references to modern history that in part appear to be anachronistic.

== Background ==
When asked about the book, Phillips replied:

It is a forgotten Victorian novel found by chance ... plundered, mined, and undermined its text to make it yield the ghosts of other possible stories, scenes, poems and replaced the text [he'd] stripped away with visual images of all kinds.

A Humument was begun in the 1960s. In 1970, Tetrad Press put out a small edition. The first trade edition was published in 1980 by Thames & Hudson, which also published revised editions in 1986, 1998 and 2004; the fifth edition was published in 2012. Each edition revises and replaces various pages. Phillips's stated goal was to eventually replace every page from the 1970 edition.

Phillips used the same technique (always with the Mallock source material) in many of his other works, including the illustration of his own translation of Dante's Inferno (published in 1985).

The altered text has been sometimes used in "reconstructions" or "realizations" where artists create a work using the fragmentary text as a basis. For instance in the early 1970s, the Music Department at the University of York performed an opera, Irma, devised by Phillips in 1969, whose lyrics and plot were based on A Humument.

Tom Phillips created a digital version of A Humument, A Humument App for the iPad, released in November 2010. The app was critically acclaimed, receiving favourable reviews in The Independent (22 Nov), Eye Blog (17 Nov), and Design Observer (5 Nov). A version for the iPhone was released on 17 January 2011. A "final" printed edition, extensively reworked by Phillips, was published by Thames & Hudson in 2016, and reviewed by Clare Pettitt in The Times Literary Supplement.
