= Little Hell, Delaware =

Unincorporated community in Delaware, United States

- Unincorporated community
- Location within the state of Delaware Little Hell, Delaware (the United States)
- Coordinates: 39°02′30″N 75°27′24″W
- Country: United States
- State: Delaware
- County: Kent
- Elevation: 26 ft (7.9 m)
- Time zone: UTC-5 (Eastern (EST))
  - Summer (DST): UTC-4 (EDT)
- Area code: 302

Little Hell is an unincorporated community in Kent County, Delaware, United States. Its elevation is 26 ft (7.9 m) and its position 39°02′30″N 75°27′24″W. It is west of Bowers Beach at the intersection of Delaware Route 1 and Bowers Beach Road, and borders the unincorporated community of Little Heaven.

== History ==
While Little Heaven was built for the Irish workers of Jehu Reed, Little Hell was built for the African-American workers at the fruit plantation of Jonathan Willis. The two plantations shared the same meadow, separated by a brook, a branch of Murderkill Neck, that was nicknamed "The River Styx" in reference to Styx from Greek mythology. Newspaper reports said the area got its name when a group of 19th Century excursionists were attacked while traveling along the road from Dover to Bowers Beach.
