= African Sources for African History =

- Discipline: History
- Language: English

Publication details
- History: Since 2001
- Publisher: Brill

Standard abbreviations
- ISO 4: Afr. Sources Afr. Hist.

Indexing
- ISSN: 1567-6951

Links
- Journal homepage

African Sources for African History is a book series published by Brill that publishes critical editions of indigenous African narrative sources from sub-Saharan Africa. The series aims to expand the sources available to historians of Africa, and to rectify bias that may have been introduced into the writing of African history through an over-reliance on sources written by Europeans.

The first in the series was the 2001 Somono Bala of the Upper Niger, an epic story of fishing people, translated into English from the Maninka language for the first time.

== Titles in series ==
- The Epic of Sumanguru Kante
- Les mémoires de Maalaŋ Galisa sur le royaume confédéré du Kaabu
- Guidance (Uwongozi) by Sheikh al-Amin Mazrui: Selections from the First Swahili Islamic Newspaper
- Print Culture and the First Yoruba Novel
- Sukuma Labor Songs from Western Tanzania
- Writing for Kenya
- Tarikh Mandinka de Bijini (Guinée-Bissau)
- Entretiens avec Bala Kanté
- The Pen-Pictures of Modern Africans and African Celebrities by Charles Francis Hutchison
- Servants of the Sharia
- Djinns, Stars and Warriors
- Telling Our Own Stories
- Les Rois des Tambours au Haayre
- Marita: or the Folly of Love
- Somono Bala of the Upper Niger
