= David Francolini =

English musician (born 1969)

- Born: 13 September 1969 (age 56); Hamilton, Bermuda
- Origin: Bristol, England
- Genres: Alternative rock, psychedelic rock
- Occupations: Musician, record producer
- Instruments: Drums, percussion, keyboards, synthesizer, piano
- Years active: late 1980s–present
- Website: twitter.com/davidfrancolini

David Thomas Giuseppe Francolini (born 13 September 1969) is an English rock drummer, songwriter and record producer, best known as the drummer in Dark Star and Levitation.

== Career ==
Prior to forming Levitation, Francolini played with several bands in Bristol in the late 1980s. He replaced the drummer in Something Pretty Beautiful, a band formed by Julian Cope's brother Joss, just before a nationwide tour with The House of Love, where he first met guitarist Terry Bickers. Francolini and Bickers co-founded the psychedelic rock band Levitation in 1990. During this period, Francolini also co-founded the band Strangelove with Patrick Duff in 1991. Francolini only played two gigs with the band before being replaced by Jon Langley.

Levitation went on to release several singles and one album. The band continued until 1994 (despite the departure of Terry Bickers in 1993), and Francolini remained with the band until the final split. He reunited with former Levitation bandmates Christian Hayes and Laurence O'Keefe in 1996 to form Dark Star. The band released one album, Twenty Twenty Sound in 1999 before splitting in 2001.

Following the demise of Dark Star, Francolini returned to Bristol and set up recording studio Ohm Studios, where he began working on the debut album with his new band Dragons, as well as the "City Of The Dead" project. Initially a studio project with singer Anthony Tombling Jr (whom Francolini has previously worked with when producing Transambient Communications and Timo Maas), news of Francolini's new band was reported in 2003 but the band didn't surface until 2007. Early shows featured both Hayes and O'Keefe as part of the live band, with the band disbanding in 2009. A second album was recorded, but was left unmixed. In 2005, Francolini produced and played on the 2005 Julian Cope albums Rite Bastard and Citizen Cain'd under the pseudonym Mitch Razor.

Francolini has more recently set up a new studio in Bristol called Komplex and has worked with artists including Mediæval Bæbes, Exit Calm and Client.
