= Levitation (band) =

British rock band (1990–1994)

- Levitation in 1991

Background information
- Origin: London, England
- Genres: Psychedelic rock, alternative rock, indie rock
- Years active: 1990–1994
- Labels: Ultimate; Rough Trade; Capitol; Chrysalis
- Past members: Terry Bickers; David Francolini; Christian Hayes; Laurence O'Keefe; Robert White; Joe Allen; Johnny T Steve Ludwin

Levitation were an English psychedelic rock band formed in London in 1990. The band consisted of frontman Terry Bickers (formerly guitarist with The House of Love), drummer David Francolini, guitarist Christian Hayes, bassist Laurence O'Keefe and keyboardist Robert White.

Bickers announced his departure from the band onstage at Tufnell Park Dome in north London on 14 May 1993. The release of the band's already completed second album, Meanwhile Gardens, was shelved. The band enlisted former Some Have Fins frontman Steve Ludwin to replace Bickers, and in 1994 the new line-up released a remixed version of Meanwhile Gardens in Australia featuring new vocals from Ludwin. The band split in October 1994, leaving the original version of their second album fronted by Terry Bickers unreleased. Hayes, Francolini and O'Keefe regrouped in 1996 to form Dark Star. They released Twenty Twenty Sound in 1999 before disbanding in 2001.

== History ==
=== Formation and early EPs ===
Following his departure from The House Of Love in 1990, Terry Bickers began forming a new band with drummer David Francolini. The pair met during Bickers' last tour with his previous band in December 1989, on which Francolini was playing with support band Something Pretty Beautiful whom he joined just days before going out on tour. They first enlisted Christian Hayes, who had played with Ring and Panixphere, played bass in The Dave Howard Singers and was currently playing guitar in Cardiacs and working as a courier. Bickers knew Hayes through musical friends in South London, and when Bickers and Francolini spotted Hayes on his courier bike by chance in Covent Garden, London they arranged to meet up in the studio. Hayes' former Ring bandmate, keyboardist Robert White (also formerly of Zag and the Coloured Beads) soon joined along with bassist Joe Allen and violinist Johnny T, a member of The Reggae Philharmonic Orchestra.

The band first played low key shows in France supporting Ride, and in Belgium supporting Galaxie 500. Soon after Johnny T left the band along with Allen, who was replaced by former Jazz Butcher bassist Laurence O'Keefe, whom Francolini knew through touring with The Blue Aeroplanes. The band signed to the independent label Ultimate Records and released their debut release in April 1991, Nadine/Coppelia EP. It was made "Single of the Week" in Melody Maker, but received a negative review in the NME. Original bassist Joe Allen appeared on early recordings "Nadine" and "Paid in Kind".

In August 1991 the band released the After Ever EP, which again made "Single of the Week" in Melody Maker, who described the EP as "blessed genius". The following month, the band released the low-key single "Squirrel" (and early recording featuring the first line-up of the band) via the new Rough Trade mail-order 7" vinyl singles club.

Through 1991 the band toured extensively, supporting the likes of Pere Ubu, All About Eve, the Psychedelic Furs and Hawkwind. The band were dropped from a tour supporting Transvision Vamp, officially because their equipment required too much stage space, but reports suggested that the headliners were worried about being overshadowed by Levitation who were receiving a lot of press due to Bickers' profile from his work with The House Of Love. The band also received further press attention from outlandish and eccentric comments Bickers would make to the press, which often displayed a fondness for conspiracy theories, leading him to be labelled "Bonkers Bickers".

In November 1991 a compilation album, Coterie, was released collating tracks from the band's previous releases along with new live recordings. The album was the first to be released in the US, via Capitol Records and saw the band play their first dates there in Los Angeles and New York.

=== Rough Trade and Need for Not ===
Following the release of Coterie, the band left Ultimate and signed to Rough Trade. They also signed to EMI in Germany and Festival Records in Australia, along with Capitol Records in North and South America. They released "World Around", their first single for the label in February 1992 which reached the top five in the UK Indie Chart.

Leviation were kicked off another tour after just three gigs, supporting The Fall. The Fall's frontman Mark E Smith reportedly took exception to the amount of time the band took to sound check and how much dry ice they used during their set. Smith allegedly called the band "a bunch of fucking poofs".

The band released their debut album, Need for Not on 4 May 1992, and the slogan "May the Fourth be with you" was used in advertising. Throughout the summer the band toured with Cardiacs, and performed at Reading Festival. The band didn't tour the album in the US as Bickers refused to go, with O'Keefe commenting that "Terry was acutely paranoid of America and failed to join us in New York and started to be a real drag". He described the moment as "the exact point at which the dynamic changed irreparably".

=== Further recording and departure of Terry Bickers ===
Following the collapse of Rough Trade, Levitation signed to Chrysalis, a sub-label that was owned by EMI Germany with whom the band were signed to there. The band began working on their second album, Meanwhile Gardens. After recording so much material towards it, the band decided it would be released in two parts, "Summer" and "Autumn". Francolini revealed that the band "started the album last year but unfortunately couldn't finance the recording. But in the time we were looking around for the money we wrote a lot more material, which we have since recorded rather quickly". With the first part completed, the band released the lead single "Even When Your Eyes Are Open" in April 1993.

However, Bickers announced his departure from the band onstage at the Dome in Tufnell Park, London the following month on 14 May. He proclaimed from the stage that "Levitation certainly are a lost cause as far as I can tell. We've completely lost it, haven't we? Haven't we?". The band had played Glasgow the previous night, and due to transportation problems had had no sleep. O'Keefe commented that "obviously the demons within and the repressed emotions were released, along with all the other toys from the pram".

A mailout to the band's fanclub featured a statement from Hayes, in which he described Bickers' departure as "an unfortunate but necessary stick in the spokes... Terry no longer wishes to be in Levitation, feeling no excitement for the material and therefore uncomfortable within the band". The band maintained that his departure was positive for all involved. A later statement on 1 June read, "Terry Bickers (the one who stood in the middle) has parted company with Levitation... We believe the circumstances in which we now find ourselves presents us with the oil to lubricate our gears".

Bickers would later admit that his mounting depression had much to do with the manner of his departure and added that "it was a crap thing to do. It was unfair on the people that came to see us and on everyone in the band... The reason I left the way I did was because I didn't want to give anyone the opportunity to talk me round." Hayes would also later admit, "I think Terry could have definitely done with more support. He had begun a family and had pressures outside our creative bubble that were out of my experience. I'm afraid I was way too self-absorbed to appreciate the difficulty of the situation he was in".

The album was shelved and a string of shows were cancelled, including a headline slot at the Phoenix Festival, a support slot with The Cure on their Great Expectations gig at Finsbury Park and a US tour with Spiritualized, The Verve and Mercury Rev.

=== The Steve Ludwin line-up, the reworked Meanwhile Gardens and the final split ===
Determined to continue, Levitation set about auditioning new singers. Although it was rumoured that the band initially asked former All About Eve singer Julianne Regan, the band announced in August 1993 the arrival of American singer Steve Ludwin who had previously fronted the London-based band Some Have Fins. It was noted in the press that the band were seen as a quintessentially English band, and Hayes responded that he "did personally have some reservations about us using an American vocal though, purely for sound reasons, and I do think that it does change the sound from how it was".

The new line-up played a series of gigs in Germany and at the Splash Club (at the Water Rats in King's Cross) in May and June 1994. A subsequent letter to the fan club stated, "The storm has passed and the voyage may begin again." The reception for the Ludwin fronted line-up however was mixed.

Instead of working on new material, the band decided to remix the existing Meanwhile Gardens album and overdub new vocals by Ludwin, removing most traces of Bickers. Hayes stated that the band "really liked the material, we'd spent a year and a half to two years writing it all, and it seemed such a waste to just dump it". The new version received a low key release in Australia, along with a single release of "King of Mice" in Germany. The band were reportedly plagued by continuing and escalating rows (Francolini would later describe Ludwin as "a vapid, careerist fool of a man and a complete waste of time"), and it was announced in October 1994 that the band had finally split up.

== Post-split ==
Immediately following his departure from the band, Bickers formed Paradise Estate with guitarist Clive Giblin. After Bickers' and Giblin' partnership dissolved, Bickers began working on material with his partner Caroline Tree and other musicians. They signed a development deal with Geoff Travis for Blanco y Negro Records and recorded an album which he would later describe as "eclectic if also a little unfocused". The album was shelved and the band were dropped from the label before anything was released. Bickers and Tree began work on new material and were reunited with Clive Giblin in the band Cradle, who released the Baba Yaga album in 1996 on Ultimate Records. The band split yet again before the end of the year. In 1996, Bickers briefly resurfaced with the Brighton-based Monkey 7. In 2003, he reformed The House of Love with Guy Chadwick, who have since released two albums Days Run Away and She Paints Words In Red.

Christian Hayes, David Francolini and Laurence O'Keefe regrouped in 1996 to form Dark Star. They released a number of EPs (I Am the Sun, Graceadelica and About 3:am) and the 1999 album Twenty Twenty Sound on EMI. Despite recording a second album, ...Out Flew Reason, in 2000, they split up in 2001 leaving the album unreleased until 2023 when it was made available on Bandcamp.

Post-Dark Star, O'Keefe embarked on a session career, while Hayes briefly played guitar in the Pet Shop Boys live band and subsequently released three solo albums of archive material under the name Mikrokosmos. Francolini re-surfaced in 2007 with a new band Dragons who released one album before splitting in 2009.

Robert White went on to front the Brighton-based The Milk And Honey Band. Several independent albums have been released and have worked with Andy Partridge's APE label.

Steve Ludwin went on to form Pura Vida, who were originally set to feature Francolini on drums. The band released several EPs on Org Records and later evolved into Carrie, who released one album, Fear of Sound in 1998. In 2001, Ludwin formed Little Hell. Ludwin also unsuccessfully auditioned to be the lead singer for Velvet Revolver. Ludwin has since moved into songwriting and production and has worked with artists including Ash, Betty Curse, The Crimea and Good Shoes. He also produced the MTV Europe show "Annoying Americans".

== Spin-offs and reissues ==
Following the band's split, several releases were announced for future release including The Barn Sessions (an instrumental album featuring Hayes, Francolini, O'Keefe & White) and The Departure Lounge (a collaboration between Francolini & White), along with mixing the second part of Meanwhile Gardens and releasing the complete album in its original form.

In 2007, Francolini confirmed plans for a Levitation re-issue campaign via Rough Trade (including the original, never released, version of Meanwhile Gardens along with an expanded edition of Need For Not and other unreleased material). However, it was later revealed that this didn't happen after Rough Trade again went into liquidation, and Beggars Banquet Records who bought the label out didn't wish to continue with the releases.

In January 2015, Hayes confirmed that Meanwhile Gardens would finally be released and it appeared on 23 October 2015.

== Members ==
- Terry Bickers – vocals, guitar (1990–1993)
- David Francolini – drums (1990–1994)
- Christian Hayes (aka Bic) – guitar, backing vocals (1990–1994)
- Robert White – keyboards, bass, backing vocals (1990–1994)
- Joe Allen – bass (1990–1991)
- Johnny T – violin (1990–1991)
- Laurence O'Keefe – bass (1990–1994)
- Steve Ludwin – vocals, guitar (1993–1994)

== Discography ==
- Coterie (1991)
- Need for Not (1992)
- Meanwhile Gardens (1994- formally released 2015)
