= Yon Yonson =

Infinitely recursive poem or song

"Yon Yonson" or "Jan Jansen" is an infinitely recursive folk song, most popular in the midwestern United States. The song being set in Wisconsin is a satirical reference to Wisconsin's Scandinavian-American culture and heritage. It is also well known for its use in the novel Slaughterhouse-Five by Kurt Vonnegut.

== Origins of the song ==
The song is often sung in a Scandinavian accent (e.g. j pronounced as y, w pronounced as v). This accent is revealed by the name "Yon Yonson", which when recited in American English is usually rendered "Jan Jansen" or "John Johnson". The Swedish pronunciation "Yon Yonson" probably dates the origin of the song to soon after the Swedes' arrival in the United States.

A possible origin of the song is the dialect stage comedy Yon Yonson by Gus Heege and W. D. Coxey (1890). The play's setting included a Minnesota lumber camp. Despite no evidence showing that the song was actually performed as part of the play, it gave birth to "Yon Yonson" as a stock character in Scandinavian-American pop culture.

== Lyrics ==
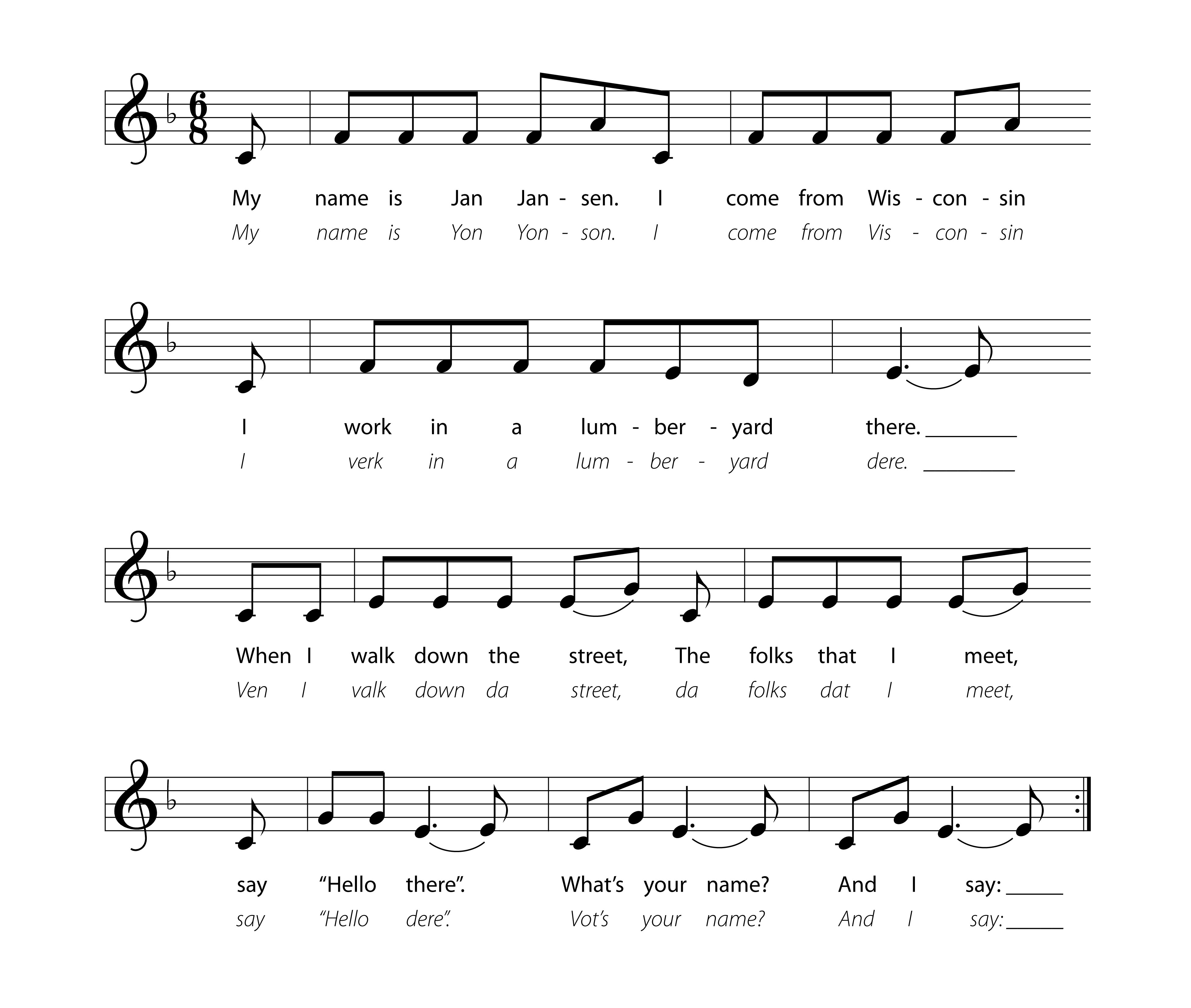
One version of the song

Numerous versions of the song exist, but all are similar to the following:

My name is Yon Yonson,
I live in Wisconsin.
I work in a lumber yard there.
The people I meet as
I walk down the street,
They say "Hello!"
I say "Hello!"
They say "What's your name?"
I say: My name is Yon Yonson... (repeated again and again).

== Other occurrences of the song ==
- In the novel Slaughterhouse-Five by Kurt Vonnegut, "Yon Yonson" is used as a motif, ultimately serving as a model for the recursive, time-repeating structure of the book.
- The song is used in chapter 11 of the novel Dodsworth by Sinclair Lewis.
- Carl Sandburg included the song in his April 1959 folk song collection, Flat Rock Ballads.
- The Canadian band The Dave Howard Singers released an industrial/punk version of "Yon Yonson" in 1987.
- The Children's Band Ralph's World released a version of this on their 2003 album Peggy's Pie Parlor. The lyrics were changed slightly from those shown in this article.
- The phrase was used in a TV promotion ("Altered States") for Calvin Klein perfume.
- In the video game Psychonauts, Sasha Nein will begin to recite this in an injury-induced daze if the battle with the mega-censor continues long enough.
- The video game Baldur's Gate II has a gnome character who joins the player's party named Jan Jansen. He often bursts into very mundane stories about himself that never seem to end.
- The song appears in the novel Coverup by Jay Bennett.
- The song was sung by two audience members on Season 23, Episode 202, of The Tonight Show with Johnny Carson. Guests were Chuck Yeager and George Carlin.
- The song has been adapted by supporters of West Ham United to reference their former goalkeeper Ludek Miklosko.
