= Twenty Twenty Sound =

Studio album by Dark Star
- Released: 1999
- Recorded: May–June 1998
- Genre: Rock
- Label: Harvest (EMI)
- Producer: Steve Lillywhite

Dark Star chronology
Twenty Twenty Sound (1999)	...Out Flew Reason (2023)

Professional ratings
Review scores
Source	Rating
NME	7/10
Q	3/5 stars

Twenty Twenty Sound is the debut studio album by the English psychedelic rock band Dark Star, released in 1999 via Harvest Records. The tracks 'I Am The Sun' and 'Gracedealica' were released as singles.

== Track listing ==
1. "96 Days"
2. "I Am the Sun"
3. "About 3am"
4. "Vertigo"
5. "Graceadelica"
6. "A Disaffection"
7. "Lies"
8. "What in the World's Wrong"
9. "The Sound of Awake"
