= Agathodaimon (band) =

German metal band

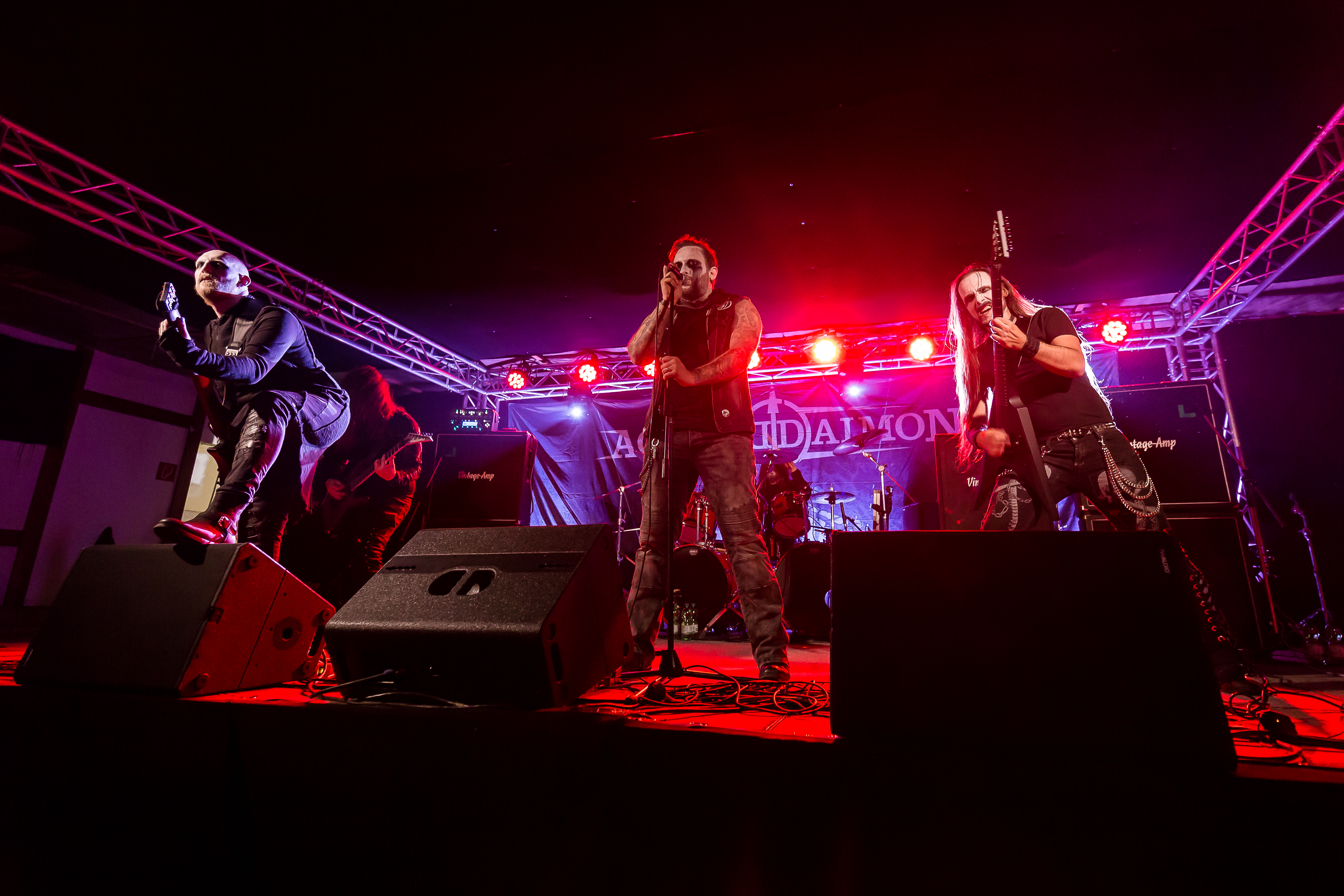
- Agathodaimon at Metal Embrace 2022

Background information
- Origin: Mainz, Germany
- Genre: Black metal
- Years active: 1996–2014, 2020–present
- Labels: Nuclear Blast, E1 Music, Massacre
- Members: Martin "Sathonys" Wickler; Chris "Ashtrael" Bonner; Michael "Nakhateth" Wöss; Max Jansch; Oliver "Mortos" Kraus
- Past members: See below
- Website: agathodaimon.de
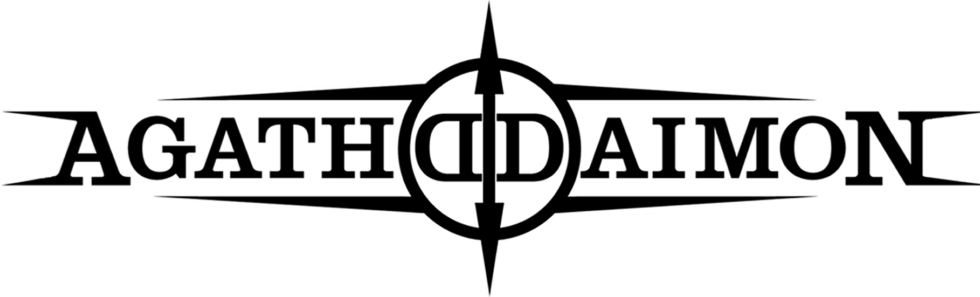

Agathodaimon ("benevolent demon" in Greek) is a German black metal band from Mainz.

== History ==
The band was formed in 1996 with guitarists Sathonys and Hyperion, drummer Matthias R., bassist Marco T., keyboardist Vampallons, and vocalist Vlad Dracul. They recorded the Carpe Noctem demo tape, which received fair reviews from the German specialized press. A Century Media executive began keeping track of the band. Agathodaimon played minor shows and support other European bands, eventually receiving an offer from Century Media to fund their second demo tape. This demo was recorded in early 1997 and was named Near Dark. It attracted the interest of a few recording labels, and the band signed with Nuclear Blast.

After composing their debut album, Blacken the Angel, Vlad quit Agathodaimon due to problems with immigration. After returning to Romania, he was denied re-entry in Germany. The situation involved the fact that he had left the country during Nicolae Ceaușescu's regime. Akaias took over on vocals. Vlad's participation on the album was restricted to the song "Contemplation Song", which he air-mailed the band.

The CD caused some impact, and Agathodaimon toured with Children of Bodom and Hypocrisy. At the height of the album's success, they opened for Dimmu Borgir, Lacrimosa and other bands.

In 1999, Vampallens quit the band to dedicate himself to his main project, Nocte Obducta. He was replaced with female keyboardist Christine S.

The band travelled to Romania to record their second album, Higher Art of Rebellion, with Vlad. Vocalist Akaias also participated in the recording, as well as singer Dan Byron performing clean vocals. Recordings took place at Magic Sound in Bucharest. A European tour as headliner with Graveworm and Siebenbürgen followed.

After a hiatus, the band recorded the album Chapter III in 2001 at the Kohlekeller Studio in Germany.

Vlad definitely quit the band, followed by Marko and Christine. The former left because of health problems, while the latter formed the band Demonic Symphony, where she plays bass and sings. Marko and Christine were replaced with Darin Smith and Felix Ü. Walzer.

In 2004, the band released the album Serpent's Embrace, recorded at Kohlekeller Studio with producer Kristian Kohlmannslehner.

In early 2006, personal differences led to Eddy quitting the band. New bass player Till (formerly active in Misanthropic, where Matthias also played drums for a while) joined, and songwriting for the next album took place. Singer, guitarist Frank "Akaias" Nordmann left in January 2007 to pursue other musical interests.

Matthias and Jonas left the band in 2008. Manuel Steitz took over on drums. In October 2008, the band announced that they had recruited new singer Ashtrael.

In 2009, the band released their fifth studio album, Phoenix. The next album, In Darkness, was released in 2013 on Massacre Records.

On 28 October 2014, the band broke up due to some members not being fully dedicated to the band, but stated that they could reunite in the future.

In February 2020, the band reunited. They released their seventh album, The Seven, on 18 March 2022.

== Band members ==
=== Current ===
- Martin "Sathonys" Wickler – guitars, clean vocals (1996–2014, 2020–present)
- Chris "Ashtrael" Bonner – vocals (2008–2014, 2020–present)
- Michael "Nakhateth" Wöss – guitars (2020–present)
- Max Jansch – bass (2020–present)
- Oliver "Mortos" Kraus – drums (2020–present)

=== Former ===
- Matthias "Matze" Rodig – drums (1996–2008)
- Carl "Hyperion" Lang – guitars (1996–2002)
- Marko Thomas – bass (1996–2002)
- Rusu "Vlad Dracul" Andrei – vocals (1996–1998)
- Marcel "Vampallons" – keyboards (1996–1998)
- Frank "Akaias" Nordmann – vocals (1998–2007), guitars (1998)
- Christine Schulte – keyboards (1998–2002)
- Felix Ü. Walzer – keyboards (2002–2010)
- Darin "Eddie" Smith – bass (2003–2006)
- Jan Jansohn – guitars (2007–2010)

=== Live ===
- Shoggoth – vocals (2000)
- Thilo Feucht – guitars (2001–2010)
- Sebas – drums (2006)
- Nicolao Dos Santos – guitars (2012–2014)

== Discography ==
Studio albums

- Blacken the Angel (1998)
- Higher Art of Rebellion (1999)
- Chapter III (2001)
- Serpent's Embrace (2004)
- Phoenix (2009)
- In Darkness (2013)
- The Seven (2022)

Compilation albums

- Tomb Sculptures (1997)

EPs

- Bislang (1999)
