= 21st Century Love Songs =

Studio album by the Wildhearts
- Released: 3 September 2021
- Studio: The Old Cider Press (Pershore, Worcestershire)
- Genre: Hard rock; heavy metal; punk rock; pop rock
- Length: 43:30
- Label: Graphite
- Producer: Dave Draper

The Wildhearts chronology
Cuts So Deep (2021)	21st Century Love Songs (2021)	Satanic Rites of the Wildhearts (2025)

Singles from 21st Century Love Songs
- 1. "Remember These Days" Released: 18 June 2021; 2. "Sort Your Fucking Shit Out" Released: 16 July 2021; 3. "Sleepaway" Released: 13 August 2021

21st Century Love Songs is the tenth studio album by British rock band the Wildhearts. Recorded at the Old Cider Press in Pershore, Worcestershire, it was produced by Dave Draper and released on 3 September 2021 by Graphite Records. The album was the band's first release since P.H.U.Q. in 1995 to reach the top ten of the UK Albums Chart, peaking at number 9. Three songs were released as singles: "Remember These Days", "Sort Your Fucking Shit Out" and "Sleepaway".

Following their first studio album in ten years, 2019's Renaissance Men, the Wildhearts returned with 21st Century Love Songs in 2021, which was the fourth studio album to feature the lineup of Ginger Wildheart, CJ Wildheart, Danny McCormack and Ritch Battersby. The album received universal acclaim from critics, who praised its high-quality songwriting and range of musical styles. It was the group's last studio album before their breakup in 2022 (they would later reform in 2024).

== Background ==
It was first revealed that the Wildhearts frontman Ginger Wildheart was writing material for a follow-up to the 2019 album Renaissance Men in 2020, during promotion for that year's live album 30 Year Itch. 21st Century Love Songs was officially announced in April 2021, with Ginger describing the upcoming album as "Sarcastic, fun, angry, proud, experimental and belligerent, all wrapped up in a big 'fuck you'" and comparing it stylistically to 1995's P.H.U.Q. "Remember These Days" was released as the first single from the album on 18 June, the lyrical content of which Ginger explained "harkens back to a more innocent time when being in a band, and simply making music, was enough". The next month, "Sort Your Fucking Shit Out" was issued as the second single, which Ginger noted was about "giving yourself a bollocking ... [for] habits or irritating behavioural patterns that we know we ought to quit". The third and final single from 21st Century Love Songs was "Sleepaway", released in August 2021 alongside the first official music video from the album, which Fraser Lewry of Classic Rock magazine described as "more than a little bit gruesome".

== Reception ==
=== Commercial ===
21st Century Love Songs was the Wildhearts' first album since 1995's P.H.U.Q. to reach the top ten of the UK Albums Chart, debuting at number 9. It reached number 2 on the Scottish Albums Chart, the highest position achieved by the band to date. The album also registered at number 2 on the UK Album Downloads and UK Rock & Metal Albums Charts; number 3 on the UK Albums Sales, UK Physical Albums and UK Vinyl Albums Charts; and number 4 on the UK Independent Albums Chart.

=== Critical ===
Professional ratings
Review scores
Source	Rating
Classic Rock	4.5/5 stars
Kerrang!	5/5
Metal Hammer	4/5 stars
Record Collector	4/5 stars
Stereoboard.com	4/5 stars

Critical reception to 21st Century Love Songs was universally positive. Writing for Kerrang! magazine, Steve Beebee awarded the album a full rating of 5/5, claiming: "Nobody does stuff like this. Nobody could if they tried. [...] Only The Wildhearts can fuse elements that appear to come from several different songs into the same four minutes and make it sound perfectly natural." He described the album as a mix of the "absolute disregard for convention" on 1994's Fishing for Luckies and the "heavily hooked songwriting" of 1995's P.H.U.Q. and concluded his review by suggesting that "perhaps after all these years we can finally say it: The Wildhearts are a national treasure". Classic Rock writer Johnny Sharp awarded the album 4.5 stars, praising the range of musical styles displayed and suggesting that "for the most part it makes every other record released this year sound like hopelessly anodyne easy listening in comparison".

Metal Hammer reviewer Dave Everley gave 21st Century Love Songs a rating of four stars out of five, praising the album's "uppercut melodies and knockout choruses", and the unexpected use of various genres throughout multiple songs. Comparing it to the band's previous album Renaissance Men, which he claimed was "their best outing since their genius-level 1993 debut Earth vs the Wildhearts", Everley claimed that the 2021 release is "not quite as smack-in-the-face immediate as its predecessor was, but it's not far off". Simon Ramsay of Stereoboard.com called 21st Century Love Songs "one of the most well crafted rock albums of the year".

At the end of 2021, Kerrang! ranked 21st Century Love Songs at number 45 in its list of the 50 best albums of the year, with reviewer Steve Beebee (who chose it as his third best album of the year) reiterating: "[The album] had one foot wrapped in the band's mighty roots and another stomping into the future – all of it, as ever, was a joy to have in your ears." The album was not included in the Metal Hammer list of best metal albums of 2021, although six of the publication's writers included it in their top 20 lists (three of these ranked the album within their top ten albums of the year).

== Track listing ==
All tracks are written by Ginger Wildheart, except where noted

No.	Title	Length
1.	"21st Century Love Songs"	4:56
2.	"Remember These Days"	4:52
3.	"Splitter"	4:04
4.	"Institutional Submission"	5:37
5.	"Sleepaway"	5:31
6.	"You Do You"	2:42
7.	"Sort Your Fucking Shit Out"	3:13
8.	"Directions"	4:01
9.	"A Physical Exorcism"	3:43
10.	"My Head Wants Me Dead"	4:47
Total length:		43:30

Amazon edition bonus tracks
No.	Title	Writer(s)	Length
11.	"We Sing for Tim"	CJ Wildheart	3:04
12.	"Allein"	CJ Wildheart	3:02
Total length:			49:36

Japanese edition bonus tracks
No.	Title	Writer(s)	Length
11.	"Listen" (Stiff Little Fingers cover)	Jake Burns; Gordon Ogilvie	3:51
12.	"Continental" (Alkaline Trio cover)	Matt Skiba; Dan Andriano; Derek Grant	3:20
Total length:			50:41

== Personnel ==
The Wildhearts

- Ginger Wildheart – lead vocals, guitar
- CJ Wildheart – guitar, backing vocals
- Danny McCormack – bass, backing vocals
- Ritch Battersby – drums, backing vocals

Additional personnel

- Dave Draper – production, mixing, mastering, backing vocals
- Frederick Cooper – cover artwork
- Paul Barker – cover artwork
- John Sparrow – band portrait painting
- Mark Leary – artwork layout

Additional musicians

- Paul Lennox – backing vocals
- Adam Chester – backing vocals
- Tom Prater – backing vocals
- Wolves in Alcatraz – backing vocals
- Chris Straughan – backing vocals
- Ben Marsden – backing vocals
- Baz Francis – backing vocals
- Chris Catalyst – backing vocals
- Kabir Sheikh – backing vocals
- Nick Hughes – backing vocals

== Charts ==
Chart performance for 21st Century Love Songs
Chart (2021)	Peak position
Scottish Albums (OCC)	2
UK Albums (OCC)	9
UK Album Downloads (OCC)	2
UK Album Sales (OCC)	3
UK Independent Albums (OCC)	4
UK Physical Albums (OCC)	3
UK Rock & Metal Albums (OCC)	2
UK Vinyl Albums (OCC)	3

== AD/HD Rock ==
On 23 April 2022, the Wildhearts released the four bonus tracks from 21st Century Love Songs on 10" vinyl under the title AD/HD Rock as part of Record Store Day. The EP reached number 20 on the UK Vinyl Singles Chart, number 21 on the UK Physical Albums Chart and number 64 on the UK Singles Sales Chart.

Track listing

No.	Title	Writer(s)	Length
1.	"Allein"	CJ Wildheart	3:02
2.	"Continental" (Alkaline Trio cover)	Skiba; Andriano; Grant	3:20
3.	"Listen" (Stiff Little Fingers cover)	Burns; Ogilvie	3:51
4.	"We Sing for Tim"	CJ Wildheart	3:04
Total length:			13:17

Charts

Chart performance for AD/HD Rock
Chart (2022)	Peak position
UK Singles Sales (OCC)	64
UK Physical Singles (OCC)	21
UK Vinyl Singles (OCC)	20
