= 10 (Ginger album) =

Compilation album by Ginger
- Released: October 10, 2010
- Recorded: 2000–2010
- Genre: Hard rock
- Length: 68:30
- Label: Round Records

Ginger chronology
| Market Harbour (2008) | 10 (2010) | 555% (2012) |

Professional ratings
Review scores
| Source | Rating |
|---|---|
| Vital Signs | (positive) |

10 (sometimes known as Ten) is a compilation album by The Wildhearts frontman Ginger, collecting solo tracks from the previous ten years. The tracks are compiled from the Ginger albums Yoni and Market Harbour, the Silver Ginger 5 release Black Leather Mojo, and the Ginger & the Sonic Circus release Valor Del Corazon. The tracks "No Way Out But Through" and "This Too Will Pass" were previously unreleased.

Ginger also added a second collection of solo tracks, known as 10 (Two), as a free 10-track download, expanding the collection to 26 tracks overall.

== Track listing ==
All tracks are written by Ginger.

| No. | Title | Length |
|---|---|---|
| 1. | "Sonic Shake" | 3:08 |
| 2. | "Yeah Yeah Yeah" | 4:23 |
| 3. | "How Hard Can You Make It?" | 1:45 |
| 4. | "Mother City" | 3:37 |
| 5. | "Anyway But Maybe" | 3:52 |
| 6. | "Black Windows" | 5:35 |
| 7. | "Church of the Broken Hearted" | 5:13 |
| 8. | "Drinking in the Daytime" | 6:31 |
| 9. | "The Man Who Cheated Death" | 4:28 |
| 10. | "This Is Only a Problem" | 3:52 |
| 11. | "When She Comes" | 3:34 |
| 12. | "I Knew You" | 2:54 |
| 13. | "Girls Are Better Than Boys" | 3:06 |
| 14. | "Jake" | 8:24 |
| 15. | "No Way Out But Through" | 3:58 |
| 16. | "This Too Will Pass" | 4:18 |

=== 10 (Two) Track listing ===
All tracks are written by Ginger.

| No. | Title | Length |
|---|---|---|
| 1. | "Can't Drink You Pretty" | 5:18 |
| 2. | "10 Flaws Down" | 7:10 |
| 3. | "Drunken Lord of Everything" | 2:53 |
| 4. | "Holiday" | 4:01 |
| 5. | "The Monkey Zoo" | 6:01 |
| 6. | "This Bed Is on Fire" | 5:13 |
| 7. | "Inside Out" | 3:39 |
| 8. | "Why Can't You Just Be Normal All the Time" | 3:23 |
| 9. | "(Whatever Happened to) Rock 'n' Roll Girls" | 3:57 |
| 10. | "GTT" | 4:10 |
