= Jon Poole =

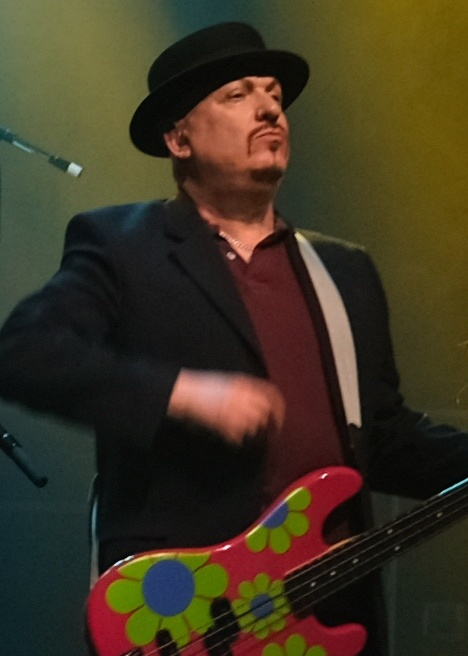
- Poole with Lifesigns in 2024

Background information
- Also known as: Random Jon Poole
- Born: Jonathan Charles Poole; 16 October 1969 (age 57); Hemel Hempstead, Hertfordshire, England
- Origin: Milton Keynes, Buckinghamshire
- Genres: Psychedelia; progressive rock; hard rock; glam punk
- Occupations: Musician; singer; songwriter; producer; director
- Instruments: Guitar; bass; vocals; keyboards; drums
- Labels: Org; Leafy Hand
- Member of: Panixphere; God Damn Whores; The Wildhearts; The Dowling Poole; Lifesigns
- Formerly of: Ad Nauseam; Cardiacs; Two Worlds Collide; Ablemesh; Dr Brighton; Silver Ginger 5; Ginger & the Sonic Circus; Celebricide; La Momo; Dr Hook
- Spouse: Louise Weekley (m. 2004)

Jonathan Charles Poole (Note: Some sources write Poole's name as "John".) (born 16 October 1969) is a British musician, singer, songwriter and producer. He was a member of Cardiacs from 1991 to 2003 and worked with Ginger Wildheart on several projects before joining the Wildhearts as their bassist across four stints: 2003 to 2005, 2012 to 2013, 2015 to 2018, and again since 2024. Since 2012, he has made music with Willie Dowling as the Dowling Poole, and since 2014 has been the bassist for the progressive rock band Lifesigns. Poole was the bassist in Dr Hook's final line-up, and in Adam Ant's current band since 2025.

Poole is the frontman and main performer of God Damn Whores and has released two solo albums. He has also been a member of Ad Nauseam and Dr Brighton, and worked with the bands Ablemesh, La Momo, Crayola Lectern, Two Worlds Collide, Celebricide and the Lotus Eaters.

== Career ==
=== Ad Nauseam (1980s) ===
"I tried to keep Ad Nauseam going... but internal arguments, power struggles and jealousy regarding girls and certain people joining their favourite bands tore the band apart. I'd vowed that I'd come back for Bob and get him in (Cardiacs) somehow but then we didn't talk for a year. We did however then kiss and make up and still love each other to this day and hey, fuck...I got him in the band!"

— Jon Poole on Ad Nauseam and his future Cardiacs bandmate Bob Leith

Following some early cassette experiments, Jon Poole's first proper band as writer and performer was the Cardiacs-inspired Ad Nauseam, formed after a move to Milton Keynes circa 1990. Although Ad Nauseam had a shifting lineup Poole played, at various times, most of the instruments in the band, with the band's other constant member being lead singer and drummer Bob Leith.

Ad Nauseam released one cassette-only album, 4 Little Boys, but split up a short time later after Poole's recruitment into Cardiacs. Poole has since expressed interest in an Ad Nauseam reunion, saying "I'd really like to do it if only to get it right this time but I don't know if it'll ever happen. I don't even know if it'd be the same line-up. Me and Bob would be there of course as it was always our band. I had a brief thought of doing a set of Ad Nauseam songs with some more obscure Cardiacs songs chucked in such as "Bitter Pill" "Big Noise in a Toy World" or "Stench of Honey" but I'm not sure if that might just be naff."

=== Cardiacs and Tim Smith (1991–2004, 2006, 2024) ===
Poole's work with Ad Nauseam (plus relentless "pestering", as a fan) had brought him to the attention of Cardiacs and their leader Tim Smith. On hearing of guitarist Christian 'Bic' Hayes departure from Cardiacs in May 1991, Poole promptly put himself forward as a replacement candidate and was recruited into the band later in the year. (His Ad Nauseam bandmate Bob Leith would also join the band as drummer, replacing the outgoing Dominic Luckman in December 1993. Poole and Leith can be spotted in the crowd during Cardiacs' Salisbury Arts Centre gig on 30 June 1990, as featured in the All That Glitters Is a Mares Nest video release.)

"Tim would have drums and rough keyboard chords on tape and would ask me to come up with guitar and bass riffs. I was literally allowed to do pretty much anything I wanted. Tim would then do the production bit and get the best out of me… I remember Tim had programmed the weird bit in the middle of "Odd Even" and left me to find a guitar line amongst the chords so I was sat on my own dropping myself in. When he came back it was done and he was very happy... particularly with my choice of last note! We would both make suggestions then Tim would edit the ideas into something that worked. Tim would chip in with ideas for my songs too like the string arrangement on "Manhoo" which was lovely."

— Jon Poole on his contributions to Cardiacs (on the Sing to God album)

Poole stayed in Cardiacs for the next thirteen years, playing second guitar and singing backing vocals (plus playing keyboards on record). He also played some of the group's bass guitar parts both on record and live (when covering for Cardiacs bass player Jim Smith). He was noted for his parodic tapping-style guitar solos on live performances of the songs "Fiery Gun Hand" and "Anything I Can't Eat".

Poole appeared on two Cardiacs albums (the 1995 double album Sing to God and its 1999 follow-up Guns) as well as on the song "Faster Than Snakes with a Ball and a Chain" from Greatest Hits album. He is one of the only Cardiacs members to have entire Cardiacs songs credited to him (including concert favourite "A Horse's Tail"), the others being Tim Smith and Colvin Mayers (who wrote the song "Food on the Wall" from the 1979 7" single "A Bus for a Bus on the Bus"), though this is from the period of which the band went by Cardiac Arrest. Poole also co-wrote songs with Smith and Leith and was also credited with co-writing riffs and arrangements on Smith's own songs.

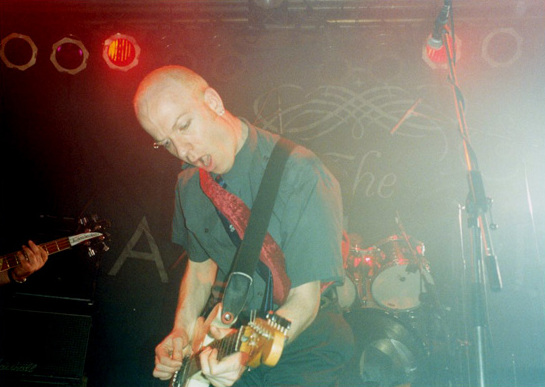
Poole performing with Cardiacs in 1999

During his Cardiacs stint, Poole also participated in a pair of Cardiacs-related projects, covering on keyboards for William D. Drake at a couple of Sea Nymphs live performances and playing guitar in an early 90's lineup of the Christian Hayes-led thrash band Panixphere (alongside Tim Smith on bass guitar). Poole and Hayes would regroup in 2019 as Panixphere once again, aided by Bob Leith on drums.

Poole left Cardiacs amicably in 2004 due to other musical commitments, and has remained a friend and fan. He was present in the crowd for the live performances collected on Cardiacs' The Special Garage Concerts, recorded in 2003 during replacement guitarist Kavus Torabi's first stint with the band, and can be heard conversing with Tim Smith prior to the song "An Ant". Poole played live acoustic sets with Tim Smith and Ginger Wildheart in 2006, pulling double duty for Smith's opening solo set and Ginger & the Sonic Circus.

Poole performed live with Cardiacs members "past, present, and future" for sold-out gigs honoring Tim Smith in 2024, as well as for a BBC Radio 6 Music Riley & Coe live session.

=== Two Worlds Collide (1992–unspecified date in 1990s) ===
On joining Cardiacs, Poole befriended the band's guitar technician – the former Alternative TV guitarist Clive Giblin was hired in the role – and was subsequently drawn into a Giblin songwriting project "specifically designed to put the listener on edge." This project became Two Worlds Collide, which Poole contributed to using virtually every instrument he played (initially guitar and keyboards, followed by bass guitar and finally, in a later line-up) drums). Two Cardiacs drummers – Bob Leith and Dominic Luckman – also played drums for the project at various times.

During Poole's tenure, Two Worlds Collide recorded the Sympathetic Storm album (eventually released in 2006 by the Le Cluricaun label.) but did not play live due to the members' other commitments. Although Poole left the band during the 1990s, Two Worlds Collide (currently managed by former Public Image Ltd publicist Helen Maleed) has continued with a lineup of Giblin, Leith and Marina Young, working on a second album and live performances.

=== Ablemesh and Dr Brighton (1990s) ===
While still a member of Cardiacs, Poole also played and worked with Ablemesh, a Milton Keynes art-rock band centred on singer/publicist Gordon Glass, guitarist/lyricist Sean Walmsley and drummer/photographer Wig Worland. (Other members of the band during its 1991–1996 lifespan included drummers Bob Leith and Mark Turner, bass players Andy Allum, Sujay Jayaram and Allan Thompson, and keyboard player Mike Turbutt.) Fiercely independent, Ablemesh practised a multimedia approach to their combined art and explored various new ways of reaching an audience. This included a distribution experiment anticipating the later practise of viral distribution, in which the band's 1992 Shareware EP was produced in an extremely limited run of three CDs only, with the CD's recipients simply invited to copy the music onto cassette free of charge and to pass it on. The band repeated the experiment with the follow-up EP Fecund. They also explored a related promotion idea by exploiting a loophole in the law which effectively allowed them to place dummy Ablemesh cassette releases on the shelves of the record departments of mainstream retailers such as Woolworths (each dummy copy contained an insert telling the reader where they can get mail order copies).

Poole's main involvement with Ablemesh was in 1995, when he played bass guitar with the band, apparently "reinvented" many of their songs and produced their album Present Imperfect. The latter was recorded entirely on an analogue cassette 4-track machine using Poole's determined and innovative production skills. The album remained unreleased until 2006 when a remastered version was made available as a download via the Ablemesh homepage.

In 1995, Poole and Walmsley formed Dr Brighton, a more straightforward rock band with punk and pop influences. Poole fronted the band, sharing guitar and vocal duties with Walmsley (with whom he also wrote the songs). The rest of the band were current or former Ablemesh members – Allum on bass guitar, Turbutt on keyboards and percussion and Leith on drums. The band recorded a number of tracks and played live, but did not officially release any albums or singles. A 1995 self-titled album, ripped straight from cassette, was made available by the band on SoundCloud in 2016.

=== Silver Ginger 5, the Wildhearts, Ginger & the Sonic Circus (2000–2005 plus intermittent reunions) ===
"I was filled with excitement (about) playing in Japan (with Silver Ginger 5), the fact we had a drummer and the fact that the Who's "5.15" had just started blaring out of the pub juke box. In front of the guitarist and the manager, both of whom I'd never met before, I jumped up on the table, kicked over our pints and strutted up and down the table miming along with Roger Daltrey whilst doing the odd bit of "air brass"... The next day Ginger called the manager to see how our meeting went (and the manager said) "Er, yeah, Ginger, em fine.... incidently, your new bass player: He's very random isn't he?" Now bear in mind that the phrase "Random" wasn't used in such a way in 2000 as it is now, and Ginger thought this was really funny and I think he'd had concerns over how to market a bald bloke in a mod suit to a bunch of rockers, so decided that giving me a nickname may endear me to the metal crowd. So "Random Jon Poole" was born."

— Jon Poole on gaining his nickname

In 2000, due to Cardiacs' influence on (and friendly relationship with) the Wildhearts, Poole began to work with Wildhearts leader Ginger on the latter's spin-off project Silver Ginger 5. Poole played on the Black Leather Mojo album (produced by Tim Smith) and joined the Silver Ginger 5 live band as bass player. It was on the first day of Silver Ginger 5 rehearsals that Poole gained his nickname of "Random Jon".

Poole's work with Silver Ginger 5 led directly to him joining the Wildhearts in 2003 (replacing Danny McCormack on bass). This move ultimately led to him leaving Cardiacs in 2004 due to the demands of the Wildhearts' touring schedule. When the Wildhearts split up again in 2005, Poole continued to play as part of Ginger's band Ginger & the Sonic Circus and on Ginger's solo tours and albums. Poole performed on Ginger's 2007 Yoni album (with production and musical contributions by Tim Smith). Since the Wildhearts' 1997 split, Poole and Scott Sorry have contributed bass at different points, with often fleeting appearances from McCormack. Poole rejoined the Wildhearts in December 2012 when the Wildhearts reformed for Ginger's annual Birthday Bash, and would continue to play live with them until 2017. After three previous stints in the Wildhearts, Poole returned as bassist in 2024 in the band's reconfigured line-up two years after a split. He played on the album Satanic Rites of the Wildhearts, released in March 2025.

Poole also contributed to Mutation (an industrial rock/noise project formed by Ginger in 2012 in collaboration with his frequent solo project drummer Dean "Denzel" Pearson and Scott Lee Andrews of Exit International). This group simultaneously released the albums The Frankenstein Effect and Error 500. Poole contributed guitar, bass guitar and vocals to the project, alongside other contributors including Mark E. Smith, Napalm Death's Shane Embury and John Mackenzie of Hawkeyes.

=== God Damn Whores (2005–present) ===
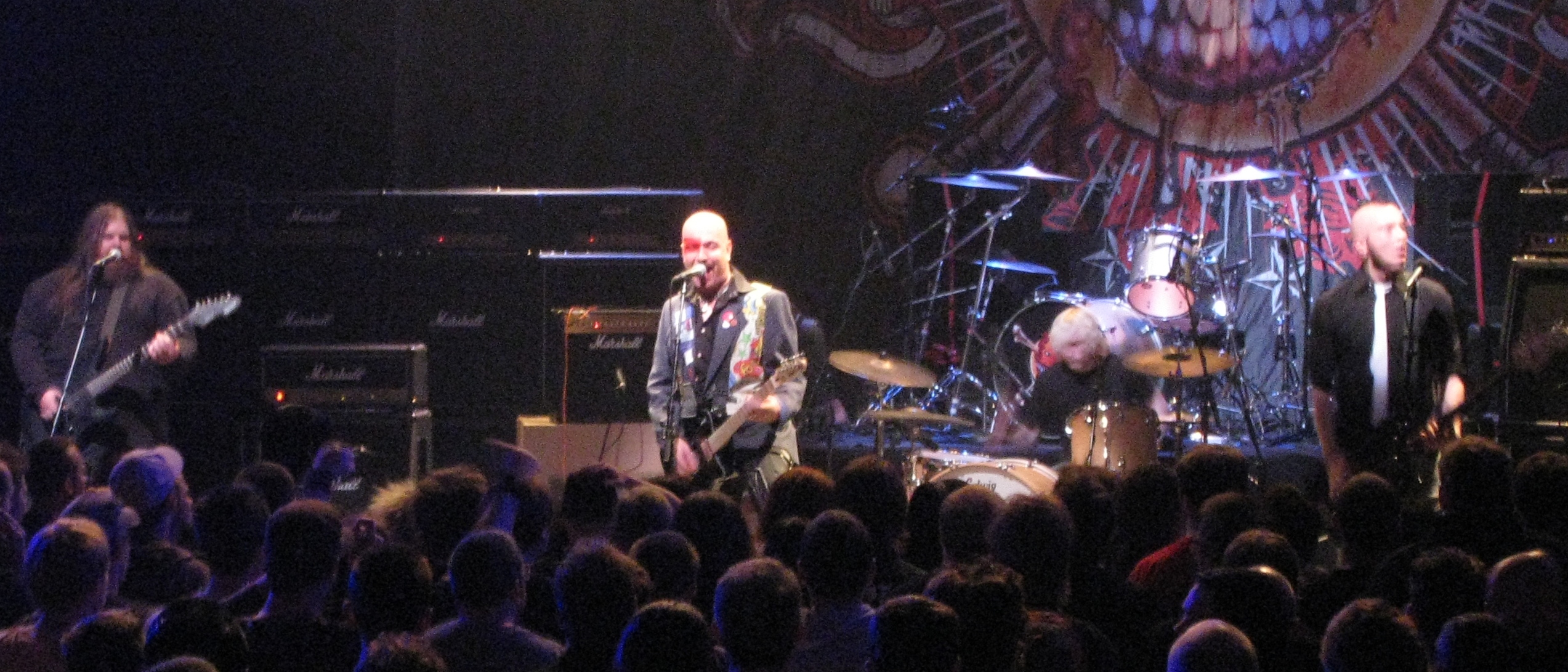
The God Damn Whores supporting the Wildhearts at Shepherd's Bush Empire in 2008

After leaving the Wildhearts in 2005, Poole created the God Damn Whores, a glam punk/hard rock band centred on himself as lead vocalist and guitarist. The band has a flexible lineup which Poole describes as "just me and anyone else who happens to be available." At various times the God Damn Whores has featured Ginger, Denzel, Wolfsbane guitarist Jase Edwards and Chris Catalyst (The Sisters of Mercy/Eureka Machines). God Damn Whores have supported both Cardiacs and the Wildhearts on tour.

The band's first album, We Are the Lucky Thirteen, was released on Round Records. Poole later described this recording as "a bit of fun" and stated that it would be entirely eclipsed by the follow-up ("a very tribal/glam/psychedelic affair.") On 19 October 2012, Poole launched the second God Damn Whores album, Heya Heya Heya Heya Ho! via PledgeMusic. releasing the album on 29 December 2012. On this release, Poole played all instruments although some guitar solos were contributed by Jase Edwards.

=== Other collaborations (Crayola Lectern, La Momo, Celebricide, The Lotus Eaters) ===
Poole has been involved in several Brighton-based collaborations with fellow psychedelic/experimental rock musician Chris Anderson. Since 2008, Poole has been part of Anderson's psychedelic rock project Crayola Lectern, in which he plays Casio synthesizer. Since 2009, Poole has played drums for La Momo (which features Anderson on guitar). During 2006, Poole drummed for Celebricide, which featured two of his future La Momo bandmates (both Chris Anderson and Sadie Fredericks).

In June 2009, Poole announced that he had joined the cult 1980s indie rock band the Lotus Eaters as bass player. He performed at their concert at the Liverpool Philharmonic on 25 July that year.

In April 2014, a PledgeMusic preorder campaign was launched for a new project called the Dowling Poole, a power pop band whose influences are quoted as 10cc, the Beatles and XTC, among others. The project sees Poole teaming up with Willie Dowling, who had been the frontman of Honeycrack and Jackdaw4, and had played as a session keyboardist with the Wildhearts in the mid-1990s. The album Bleak Strategies was released on 11 August 2014 through 369Music, to highly positive reviews. In 2016, the Dowling Poole released another well-received album, One Hyde Park. On the studio recordings, Poole is responsible for bass and drums, and also contributes vocals and guitar along with Dowling.

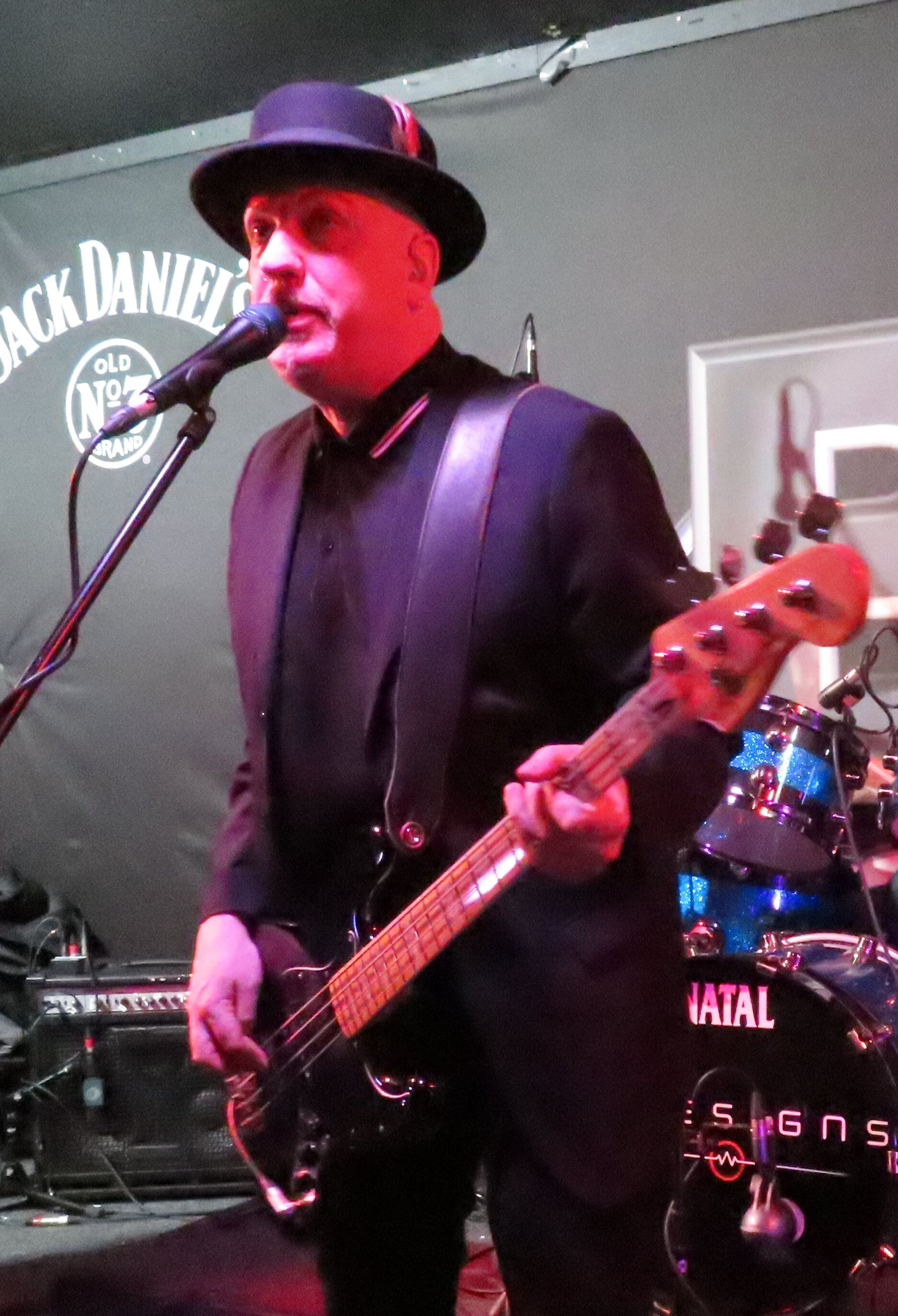
Poole performing with Lifesigns in 2020

In 2014, Poole replaced Nick Beggs on bass in the progressive rock band Lifesigns after their debut record, and was featured on their third album Altitude. In 2017, Poole joined Dr Hook Starring Dennis Locorriere, which Grant Moon of Prog called his "money gig". Poole is the bassist for Adam Ant's current band since 2025.

== Musical style and influences ==
Poole's projects tend to draw from or combine punk rock, progressive/art rock and hard rock, mostly due to his manic performance style, punk-style vocals and dual interest in complexity and raw riffs. He has also commented "I find beautiful perfection repellent."

However, Poole has cited a wide range of influences affecting his music, starting with the jazz which his family were all interested in (and played). As a listener, he subsequently became interested in (in rapid succession), contemporary disco and soul, New Wave and 1980s synth pop, and 1960s pop. This was followed by a period "catching up with" punk and post-punk, followed by ska, 2-Tone music and Trevor Horn producer pop. By the mid-to-late 80s, when he was beginning to play in bands, he was listening to maverick American art-rock heroes such as Captain Beefheart, Tom Waits, Frank Zappa and also to British progressive rock from the 1970s (as well as contemporary prog-inspired bands – most notably Cardiacs). A review of the Cardiacs album Guns in Organ called Poole "an underrated guitar talent".

Poole has also expressed interest in a variety of 1990s rock and pop acts including Nirvana, Blur, Sugababes and others. He is a fan of several classical composers – Igor Stravinsky, Erik Satie, Ralph Vaughan Williams and Gustav Holst. He is a fan of and influenced by bands such as XTC, Sparks, and DEVO.

== Work as solo artist ==
In addition to his band projects, Poole has released two albums under his own name.

"When Uncle Frank died in 1993 I lost it big time. I must've been like one of those embarrassing Elvis fanatics that couldn't imagine a world with him not in it… Being only 23 years old when hit with this hammer I decided in a very obsessive manner that I simply must pay tribute to the man the only way I knew how. I set out to stay as faithful as possible to the original arrangements but wanted the mix to sound more inviting to people who don't like Zappa… My only criticism of it in hindsight is the crap attempt at an American accent which at times sounds more West Country than anything else, but that's probably the XTC fan in me… I can't imagine that I'd do anything like that again but it did manage to drag in a few new converts, so maybe re-writing the New Testament wasn't such a crazy idea after all!"

— Jon Poole on his Frank Zappa tribute

In 1994, Poole released a particularly ambitious Frank Zappa tribute album Mothers Covers (later renamed What's the Ugliest Part Of Your Body?) which was released in 1994. On this album, Poole performed a surprisingly accurate and effective one-man band rendition of old Mothers of Invention songs using only multiple overdubbed vocal parts, guitars, a Yamaha DX7 synthesizer and a primitive Alesis HR16 drum machine. In January 2003 the album was released as What's the Ugliest Part of Your Body – The Works of Frank Zappa Circa 1965–69 on Org Records. It was reissued again via Bandcamp in November 2013.

On 19 October 2012, Poole launched his second solo album, Random Jon Poole on PledgeMusic, making the digital version available on 29 December 2012 (with a CD version scheduled for March 2013).

== Personal life ==
Jonathan Charles Poole was born on 16 October 1969 in Hemel Hempstead, Hertfordshire. Poole comes from a musical family and is the youngest of six children, all of whom play musical instruments. One of his brothers is highly regarded session bass player Ed Poole and one of his sisters is jazz trombonist Cathi "Trombabe" Poole, a member of the Cathi Cook Quintet and former musical director of the Milton Keynes Open Band. On 5 June 2004, Poole married the British actress Louise Weekley, now known as Louise Rhian Poole, in Brighton, Sussex. The couple have a son, Evan.

== Discography ==
=== Solo ===
- What's the Ugliest Part of Your Body? (1994)
- Random Jon Poole (2013)

==== Appearances ====
- Cardiacs and Affectionate Friends (2001) ("Swim in My Own Blood")

With Ad Nauseam

- 4 Little Boys (1991)

With Cardiacs

- Heaven Born and Ever Bright (1992)
- Sing to God (1996)
  - "Bellyeye" (single, 1995)
  - "Odd Even" (single, 1996)
  - "Manhoo" (single, 1996)
- Guns (1999)
  - Cardiacs/Camp Blackfoot (single, 1999)
  - "Signs" (single, 1999)
- Greatest Hits (2002) ("Faster Than Snakes with a Ball and a Chain")
- The Special Garage Concerts (2005) (chat that follows the tune "Pilf", as audience member)
- Cardiacs E.P. (2025) ("Faster Than Snakes with a Ball and a Chain")

With Ablemesh

- "Cancel Life" (1995) – 91 weekly Physical Singles Chart 2012
- Present Imperfect (2007)
- Sunshine to Mist (2017)

With Sidi Bou Said

- Entertain (live EP, 1995) ("Big Yellow Taxidermist")
- Obsessive (1997)
  - "Funnybody" (single, 1996)
  - "Like You" / "Obsessive" (single, 1997)

With Umbrella Heaven

- New Friend (EP, 1997)

With Silver Ginger 5

- Black Leather Mojo (2000)

With the Wildhearts

- "Top of the World" (2003, B-side "L.T.D.")
- Coupled With (2004)
- The Wildhearts Strike Back (2004)
- I Love Guitar Wolf Very Much (2004) ("Wild Zero")
- Rock City vs the Wildhearts (2014)
- Never Outdrunk, Never Outsung: PHUQ Live (2016)
- Cuts So Deep (2021)
- Dÿnämizer (2022)
- Satanic Rites of the Wildhearts (2025)

With Ginger Wildheart

- The Great White Monkey (2004)
- A Break in the Weather (2005)
- Potatoes & You (2005)
- Live Begins at 40 (2005)
- Yoni (2007)
- Market Harbour (2008)
- Kiss Alive II (2011)
- 555% (2012)
- Albion (2014)
- G·A·S·S· (2015)
- Excess GASS (2020)
- Dÿnämizer (2022)
- Love in the Time of Cholera (2022)

With the God Damn Whores

- We Are the Lucky Thirteen (2006)
- Heya Heya Heya Heya Ho! (2013)

With Celebricide

- Monovoid EP (2004)
- See the Bad Nurse Make Disease (2006)
  - "Resist or Serve" (single)

With Crayola Lectern

- The Fall and Rise of... (2013)
- Happy Endings (2018)

With Mutation

- Error 500 (2013)

With Lifesigns

- Live in London – Under the Bridge (2015)
- Cardington (2017)
  - "Impossible" (promo single, 2020)
- Altitude (2021)
- Live in the Netherlands (2023)
- Anthology (2026)

With Dr Brighton

- The self titled 1995 album from Dr Brighton. (2016)

With Panixphere

- Leader of the Starry Skies: A Tribute to Tim Smith (A Loyal Companion) (2010) ("To Go Off and Things")
- Confinement/release6 (2020)
- Gods and Zeroes (2026)

With the Iko Alliance

- Remain Calm (EP, 2020)

With Dave Bainbridge

- To the Far Away (2021)

With Uniquet Music Ltd

- "I Succumb" ("Love of a Dog") (2022)
- "I Do Remember The Feeling (Single Version)" (2022)
- Mememusic (2023) ("Towards The Edge", "Commuting Communion", "I Do Remember The Feeling", "Music (Is The Way Out)")
- Tom's Wrong (And Other Stories From MEMEmusic) (2023)

With Joab Nevo

- "Altered" (2025)

With Spratleys

- Bloom (2026)
