= Bryan Scary =

American musician (born 1983)

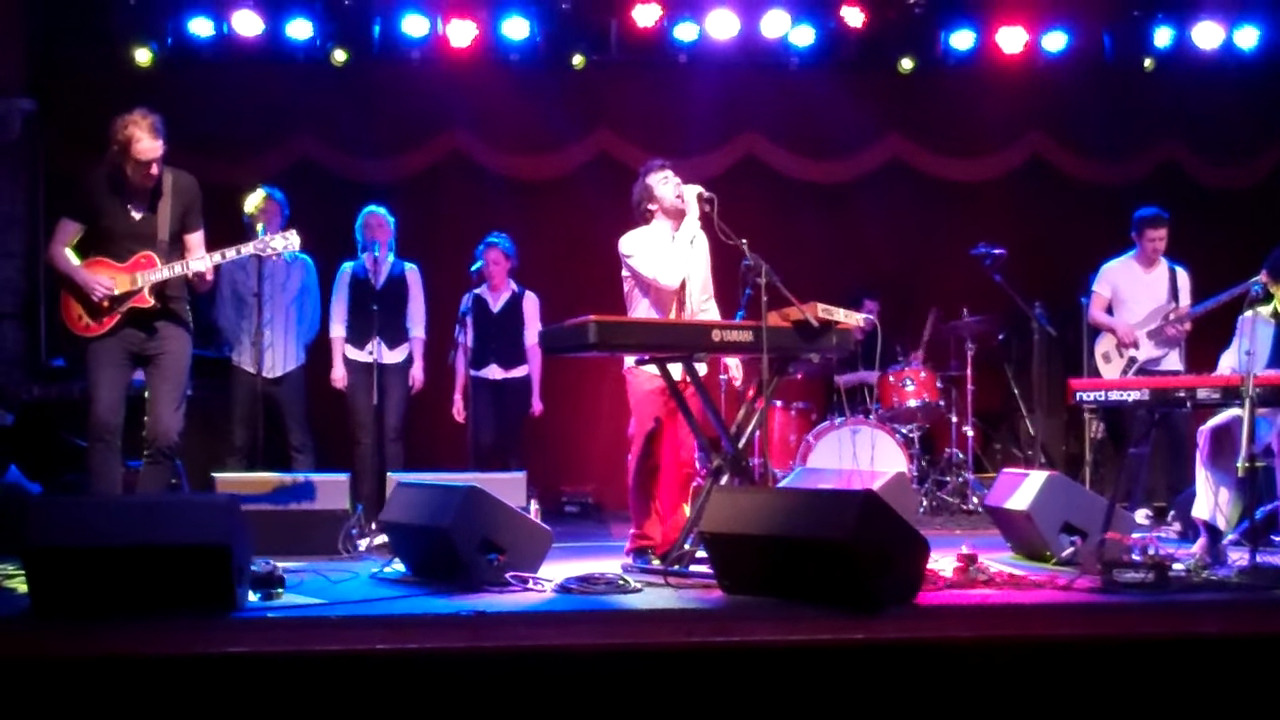
- Bryan Scary performing in 2012

Background information
- Born: Bryan Treitler; January 27, 1983 (age 43)
- Genres: progressive rock; psychedelic pop; power pop; alternative rock; indie rock
- Occupations: Musician; composer; producer; filmmaker
- Instruments: Piano; keyboards; guitar; percussion
- Years active: 2006–present
- Labels: Black & Greene; Paper Garden; Lavaslope; Old Flame; Rallye; Needlejuice; Scaryville

Bryan Scary (born Bryan Treitler) is an American musician.

== Career ==
Scary's career in music began in Brooklyn, New York City. He received a degree in film production from New York University in 2005. As a film student, Scary wrote and directed several student films including Sunset Town in 2003, and The Gun Play in 2005.

His musical debut and first album, The Shredding Tears, was released by Black and Greene Records on October 31, 2006. Scary played all instruments on the album save for the drums, which were played by Jeremy Black of Apollo Sunshine. In live performance Bryan Scary plays with his band, "The Shredding Tears."

In 2007 the band launched multiple tours nationwide. In September–October 2007, the band went into the studio to record their newest album Flight of the Knife. It was released April 1, 2008, on Black and Greene Records.

On May 14, 2008, Flight of the Knife was chosen as the "Editor's Pick" on iTunes and skyrocketed to the top-30 albums in a day. It was also ranked No. 6 in the "Rock Albums" section.

Prior to releasing their latest EP, Mad Valentines, Scary signed with Brooklyn based record label, Old Flame Records. The band toured with this EP in 2009.

Bryan Scary's third full-length release and second album recorded with his band (the Shredding Tears) is titled Daffy's Elixir. It is a wild west-themed conceptual album which was funded in part by money pledged from friends and fans through Kickstarter. More than $16,000 was raised towards production of the album. Bryan recorded fully orchestrated demos for his band members which were then worked out in rehearsals prior to the sessions. The recording sessions for the album began in Brooklyn, NY with producer Bryce Goggin (Pavement, Phish) on February 25, 2010. Goggin had previously mixed the single "Red Umbrella" for Bryan Scary which was included on the Mad Valentines EP. Daffy's Elixir was released April 24, 2012, on Paper Garden Records/Lavaslope Records.

In 2013, Bryan Scary played keyboards and sang backing vocals on Ginger Wildheart's album, Albion. Additionally, Scary provided vocals on one track from Ginger Wildheart's side project, Hey! Hello!. In 2013, Scary provided vocals on Spacehog's fourth studio album, As It Is On Earth. In late 2013, Scary was featured on a collaborative single by Eyal Amir, "Bad News Jitterbug".

In January 2014, Bryan and his new band Evil Arrows (Bryan Scary, Everet Almond, Graham Norwood, and Adrian Perry), released the first in a series of EPs simply titled 1. The purpose of this side project was to allow Bryan to experiment outside of the style restrictions he had built up under The Shredding Tears and solo career. As of March 2015 the band has released 5 EPs (1,2,3,4 & 5). The first 3 EPs were released as a full-length LP in Japan on Rallye Records titled 1-2-3. The band has plans to release at least another 2 EPs from the original sessions which started in August 2013. All the recordings were done in a DIY style at the band's rehearsal space in Brooklyn.

In early 2015, Scary released a "collection of outtakes, demos, memos, and left behinds" on his Bandcamp page, titled Scary's Closet, Volume 1. This compilation features unfinished projects from Scary's time writing and touring Flight of the Knife, as well as demos of Mad Valentines and Flight of the Knife itself. Around the same time, he launched a fundraiser on PledgeMusic for his new full-length Album titled BIRDS and he reached his set goal by 137% in May later that year. Though the project had an approximated release date for October that same year, it was delayed. Bryan Scary released Birds on June 6, 2019.

In 2016, Bryan Scary and The Shredding Tears-alumnus Giulio Carmassi co-founded music and sound production company, Hummingbirds. Under this company, they have composed music for several shorts, documentaries, and films. In 2017, Scary played piano and keyboards on Chris Catalyst's Life Is Often Brilliant.

In October 2020, 'Flight of the Knife' was reissued on vinyl and cassette by Needlejuice Records. In early 2021, Scary released a follow-up to Scary's Closet, Volume 1. Scary's Closet, Volume 2 features unused demos from miscellaneous projects, as well as instrumentals for Flight of the Knife and Daffy's Elixir.

Bryan Scary has announced plans for a Birds sister album, though it has since been delayed due to COVID-19 pandemic limitations. Bryan has also announced on Twitter that he's simultaneously working on a different album with "no acoustic guitars, lots of synth, much darker tone than Birds, and a big emphasis on rhythm...glammy Krautrock vibes." Both albums are completely written and are in the process of recording, totaling around 38 tracks.

== Band members ==
- Mike Acreman – keyboards and vocals (The Shredding Tears)
- Graham Norwood – guitar and vocals (The Shredding Tears & Evil Arrows)
- David Ostrem – bass and vocals (The Shredding Tears)
- Paul Amorese – percussion (The Shredding Tears)
- Giulio Carmassi – horns, percussion, strings (The Shredding Tears)
- Bryan Scary – keyboards and vocals (The Shredding Tears & Evil Arrows)
- Everet Almond – drums and vocals (Evil Arrows & Bryan Scary)
- Adrian Perry – bass and vocals (Evil Arrows)

=== Former members ===
- Brian Bauer – drums (The Shredding Tears)

== Discography ==
=== Bryan Scary ===
- The Shredding Tears (October 31, 2006)
- Daffy's Elixir (April 24, 2012)
- Scary's Closet, Volume 1 (March 15, 2015)
- Birds (June 6, 2019)
- Bobolinks EP (March 18, 2020)
- D.G.O Single (July 12, 2020)
- Scary's Closet, Volume 2 (April 2, 2021)

=== The Shredding Tears ===
- Flight of the Knife (April 1, 2008)
- Mad Valentines EP (October 27, 2009)

=== Evil Arrows ===
- EP 1 (January 21, 2014)
- EP 2 (March 18, 2014)
- EP 3 (June 24, 2014)
- EP 4 (September 30, 2014)
- EP 5 (March 3, 2015)

=== Soundtracks ===
- Jeremiah Tower: The Last Magnificent (2016)
- Wasted! The Story of Food Waste (2017)
- Hourglass Present (2017)
- Warrior Women (2018)
- Black Bear (2020)
- Give Me Pity! (2022)
- Please Baby Please (2022)

=== Singles ===
- Everybody Scream (2024)
- The Witch in the Room (2025)

=== Film scores ===
Bryan Scary has scored several short films and documentaries, often alongside bandmate Giulio Carmassi. Most notably, the pair wrote and composed the soundtrack for Sundance Film Festival comedy-drama Black Bear. Recently Scary and Carmassi composed and performed the soundtrack for the 2022 film Please Baby Please.

=== Film appearances ===
Bryan appears as a cameo in the film Let Them Chirp Awhile (2007) written and directed by Jonathan Blitstein. The songs that were used in the film was Shedding Tears (All Over the Place), Blood Club, Stab at the Sun, Bottom of the Grave and Misery Loves Company.
