= P.H.U.Q. =

Studio album by The Wildhearts
- Released: 22 May 1995
- Recorded: 1994–1995
- Genre: Rock
- Length: 50:26
- Label: East West

The Wildhearts chronology
Fishing for Luckies (1994)	P.H.U.Q. (1995)	The Best of The Wildhearts (1996)

Alternate releases
- Limited edition velvet case

Professional ratings
Review scores
Source	Rating
Allmusic	link
Collector's Guide to Heavy Metal	9/10

P.H.U.Q. is the second full-length album by British Rock band The Wildhearts, which was released on 22 May 1995 on East West Records and entered the UK Albums Chart at number 6.

Original guitarist/singer C.J. was only present for some of the early recording sessions for this album and was later fired by group leader Ginger. Subsequently, some of the album's songs were recorded with Ginger as the sole guitar player.

It was the band's original vision to follow up Earth vs the Wildhearts with a double album, to include longer, more intricate songs such as "Inglorious" and "Do the Channel Bop." However, lack of support from their record label, EastWest, meant that six songs written by that point were instead released as a fan club-only mini-album, Fishing for Luckies, prior to the release of P.H.U.Q.

Ginger has said the title of the album is pronounced "fuck" in the Ask Ginger section of the band's official website.

In 2015, The Wildhearts toured the UK and Tokyo, playing the album in its entirety for its 20th anniversary. These shows were recorded and released the following year as a live album entitled Never Outdrunk, Never Outsung - PHUQ Live.

== Track listing ==
All songs written by Ginger.

No.	Title	Length
1.	"I Wanna Go Where the People Go"	5:05
2.	"V-Day"	4:40
3.	"Just in Lust"	3:32
4.	"Baby Strange"	0:53
5.	"Nita Nitro"	3:49
6.	"Jonesing for Jones"	4:38
7.	"Woah Shit, You Got Through"	2:35
8.	"Cold Patootie Tango"	1:59
9.	"Caprice"	5:45
10.	"Be My Drug"	4:59
11.	"Naivety Play"	3:42
12.	"In Lilly's Garden"	3:08
13.	"Getting It / Don't Worry 'bout Me" (Hidden track, starts at 4:40)	5:45

Japanese Bonus Tracks
No.	Title	Length
14.	"If Life Is Like A Love Bank I Want An Overdraft (From Fishing for Luckies)"	3:51
15.	"Do the Channel Bop (From Fishing for Luckies)"	7:52

German Bonus Tracks
No.	Title	Length
14.	"Inglorious (From Fishing for Luckies)"	7:39
15.	"Schizophonic (From Fishing for Luckies)"	8:13

2010 Re-issue Bonus Disc
No.	Title	Length
1.	"Shandy Bang"	2:55
2.	"Can't Do Right For Doing Wrong"	5:19
3.	"Give the Girl a Gun"	4:16
4.	"Mindslide"	3:55
5.	"Friend for Five Minutes"	5:00
6.	"S.I.N. (In Sin)"	1:43
7.	"Sick of Drugs"	4:46
8.	"Underkill"	3:50
9.	"Bad Time To Be Having a Bad Time"	4:54
10.	"Sky Chaser High"	2:15
11.	"Red Light - Green Light"	2:53
12.	"Got It On Tuesday"	3:54
13.	"Do Anything"	7:10
14.	"All American Home Boy Crowd"	4:31

- Tracks 1–3 taken from "I Wanna Go Where the People Go".
- Tracks 4–6 taken from "Just in Lust".
- Tracks 7–10 taken from "Sick of Drugs".
- Tracks 11–14 taken from "Red Light - Green Light".

=== 2022 Re-release ===
In 2022, it was announced that a remastered version of the album would be released on Round Records, restoring the tracks from the original Fishing for Luckies release, to form a double album with the originally intended tracklist.

P.H.U.Q. Deluxe
No.	Title	Length
1.	"Inglorious"	7:41
2.	"I Wanna Go Where the People Go"	5:04
3.	"Schizophonic"	8:26
4.	"Baby Strange"	0:52
5.	"Nita Nitro"	3:48
6.	"Do the Channel Bop"	7:40
7.	"Cold Patootie Tango"	1:58
8.	"Caprice"	5:42
9.	"Be My Drug"	4:59
10.	"V-Day"	4:40
11.	"Just in Lust"	3:32
12.	"Jonesing for Jones"	4:37
13.	"Woah Shit, You Got Through"	1:48
14.	"Naivety Play"	3:16
15.	"If Life Is Like A Lovebank (I Want An Overdraft)"	3:50
16.	"In Lilly's Garden"	3:07
17.	"Geordie in Wonderland"	2:49
18.	"Getting It"	4:39
19.	"Sky Babies"	12:40

== Release information ==
- UK Chart: No. 6

== Personnel ==
- Ginger - vocals, guitar
- Danny McCormack - bass, vocals
- Ritch Battersby - drums, vocals
- C.J. - guitar, vocals (on some tracks)
- Willie Dowling - keyboards
