= Diagnosis (EP) =

EP by the Wildhearts
- Released: 4 October 2019
- Studio: Treehouse (Chesterfield, Derbyshire)
- Genre: Hard rock
- Length: 21:29
- Label: Graphite
- Producer: Jim Pinder

The Wildhearts chronology
Renaissance Men (2019)	Diagnosis (2019)	30 Year Itch (2020)

Diagnosis is an extended play (EP) by British rock band the Wildhearts. Recorded at Treehouse Studio in Chesterfield, Derbyshire, it was produced by Jim Pinder and released on 4 October 2019 by Graphite Records. The EP features five new recordings alongside title track "Diagnosis", which is taken from the band's ninth studio album Renaissance Men, released earlier in 2019. Diagnosis reached number 25 on the UK Albums Chart and number 9 on the Scottish Albums Chart.

== Background ==
Following the release of their ninth studio album Renaissance Men, the Wildhearts announced that they would be releasing the "mini-album" Diagnosis, featuring the track of the same name alongside five new tracks. Physical editions of the album feature an inner sleeve comic strip illustrated by Hunt Emerson, with whom the band had worked on the artwork of their 1993 debut album Earth vs the Wildhearts. The EP was promoted on the Renaissance Men Tour Part 2, beginning the day after its release. Recordings from this tour were featured on the 2020 live album 30 Year Itch.

== Reception ==
=== Commercial ===
Diagnosis registered at number 25 on the UK Albums Chart. It also reached number 2 on the UK Rock & Metal Albums Chart, number 4 on the UK Independent Albums Chart, number 6 on the UK Vinyl Albums Chart, number 9 on the Scottish Albums, and number 11 on the UK Album Downloads Chart.

=== Critical ===
Professional ratings
Review scores
Source	Rating
Classic Rock	4/5 stars

Reviewing the EP for Classic Rock magazine, Essi Berelin described Diagnosis as "a second wave of joyous noise" following the release of Renaissance Men earlier in the year. Berelin noted that the five new tracks are "almost all cut from the same sonic cloth as Renaissance Men, though crushing closer "LOCAC" could easily be a lost effort from Endless, Nameless". In the same publication's review of Renaissance Men, Neil Jeffries selected "Diagnosis" as the best song on the album.

== Track listing ==
No.	Title	Writer(s)	Length
1.	"Diagnosis"	Ginger Wildheart	5:51
2.	"God Damn"	CJ Wildheart	3:29
3.	"A Song About Drinking"	Ritch Battersby	2:21
4.	"The First Time"	G. Wildheart; Danny McCormack	3:52
5.	"That's My Girl"	Battersby	2:47
6.	"LOCAC"	G. Wildheart	3:07
Total length:			21:29

== Personnel ==
The Wildhearts

- Ginger Wildheart – lead vocals, guitar
- CJ Wildheart – guitar, backing vocals
- Danny McCormack – bass, backing vocals
- Ritch Battersby – drums, backing vocals

Additional musicians

- Jez Dennis – backing vocals
- Ross Bannister – backing vocals
- Rosie O'Hara – backing vocals
- Lewis Wild – backing vocals

Additional personnel

- Jim Pinder – production, engineering, mixing
- Dan Jeffery – additional engineering, backing vocals
- Carl Bown – mixing
- Dave Draper – mastering
- Anthony "H" Haylock – cover artwork
- Hunt Emerson – sleeve artwork
- Shirlaine Forrest – photography

== Charts ==
Chart performance for Diagnosis
Chart (2019)	Peak position
Scottish Albums (OCC)	9
UK Albums (OCC)	25
UK Album Downloads (OCC)	11
UK Album Sales (OCC)	9
UK Independent Albums (OCC)	4
UK Physical Albums (OCC)	9
UK Rock & Metal Albums (OCC)	2
UK Vinyl Albums (OCC)	6
