= Maintain Radio Silence =

Maintain Radio Silence may refer to:

- Maintain Radio Silence (EP), by Hail the Villain
- "Maintain Radio Silence" (song), by the Wildhearts

== See also ==
- Radio silence
