= Yoni (album) =

Studio album by Ginger
- Released: 22 January 2007
- Recorded: Apollo 8, Stonehenge, 2006
- Genre: Rock
- Length: 61:45
- Label: Round Records
- Producers: Tim Smith; Jason Edwards

Ginger chronology
Valor Del Corazon (2005)	Yoni (2007)	Market Harbour (2008)

Professional ratings
Review scores
Source	Rating
Sputnikmusic	3.5/5 stars

Yoni is the second solo album by Ginger, frontman of rock band The Wildhearts. It was released on January 22, 2007 and features 12 tracks. It was produced by Tim Smith of Cardiacs, who had previously produced the debut album from SilverGinger 5, Black Leather Mojo, and Jason Edwards (Wolfsbane).

The album is dedicated to "the spirit, determination, strength & inspiration of Trace". This refers to "Trace da Space", an active and well-loved member of the Ginger/Wildhearts community, who died December 3, 2006.

== Track listing ==
1. "Black Windows" (5:35)
2. "When She Comes" (3:37)
3. "Holiday" (3:59)
4. "Smile In Denial" (6:14)
5. "Jake" (8:25)
6. "The Night I Was Born Again" (5:25)
7. "Why Can't You Just Be Normal All The Time" (3:24)
8. "Can't Drink You Pretty" (5:17)
  - Contains part of the main "riff" from "In The Mood" (as popularised by Glenn Miller) as well as the chorus from "Boogie Woogie Bugle Boy" (as popularised by the Andrews Sisters).
9. "This Bed Is On Fire" (5:13)
10. "Save Me" (5:32)
11. "Wendy You're Killing Me" (3:33)
12. "Siberian Angel" (5:31)
  - Lead vocal song by Vaden Todd Lewis, who is the singer/guitarist for Toadies.
13. "One Love, One Life, One Girl"*
14. "Inside Out"*
15. "Lil´Bit´O Gravy"*
- *Japanese bonus tracks

All songs written by Ginger.

== Personnel ==
=== Main band ===
- Ginger - vocals, guitar, percussion
- "Random" Jon Poole - bass, vocals
- Denzel - drums
- Jason Edwards - guitar, vocals
- Tim Smith - piano, Synthesizer, mellotron, tubular bells, vocals, keyboards, acoustic guitar, church organ, percussion,

=== Additional musicians ===
- Suzy Kirby - vocals
- Olga - vocals, lead guitar
- Chris Catalyst - vocals
- Tracie Hunter - backing vocals
- Phoebe White - backing vocals
- Ben Davies - piano
- Tom Evans - violin
- Sara Longe - violin
- Helen Goatly - viola
- Harry Escott - cello
- Bernie Torme - lead guitar
- Ralph Boss - baritone saxophone
- Neil Doherty - trumpet
- Tom Rushton - trumpet
- Nadiah Killick - alto saxophone
- Vaden Todd Lewis - vocals
- Sharron Fortnam - vocals
- Warner E Hodges - lead guitar
