= Fishing for Luckies =

- Cover for the 1996 Japanese edition

Studio album by The Wildhearts
- Released: 12 December 1994
- Recorded: 1994
- Genre: Hard rock; glam punk; power pop
- Length: 42:14 (original version)
- Label: East West

The Wildhearts chronology
Earth vs the Wildhearts (1993)	Fishing for Luckies (1994)	P.H.U.Q. (1995)

Reissue cover
- Cover of the unsanctioned reissue Fishing for More Luckies

Professional ratings
Review scores
Source	Rating
AllMusic	link
Collector's Guide to Heavy Metal	8/10

Fishing for Luckies is an album by The Wildhearts that originated as a fan club-only release of newly recorded material, but has since been expanded and re-released with extra tracks.

== Original release ==
The Wildhearts released the original Fishing for Luckies in December 1994 as a limited edition CD mini-album, available only via their fan club. The songs were newly recorded and featured the line-up of Ginger on vocals and guitar, C.J. on guitar and vocals, Danny McCormack on bass, and Ritch Battersby on drums. Gordon Mabbett contributed accordion on "Geordie in Wonderland" and Marc Fox played additional percussion on "Do the Channel Bop".

== Track listing ==
All songs written by Ginger.

1. "Inglorious" – 7:47
2. "If Life Is Like a Lovebank I Want an Overdraft" – 3:51
3. "Schizophonic" – 8:27
4. "Do the Channel Bop" – 7:40
5. "Geordie in Wonderland" – 2:49
6. "Sky Babies" – 11:24

== Fishing for More Luckies ==
After the top 10 success in the UK of the album P.H.U.Q. in 1995, East West Records planned to release an official version of the album, to be titled Fishing for More Luckies, with three extra demo tracks. This release was completely unsanctioned by the band and was canceled. However, cut-outs of the release were available freely in 1995. The only change to the tracks from the original fan club release was a count-in to introduce "Do The Channel Bop". Of the added tracks, a completed version of "Underkill" was later included on the "Sick of Drugs" single. A string quartet made up of Charles Mutter (violin), Thomas Norris (violin), Bruce White (viola), and Phillip Sheppard (cello) appeared on "Saddened".

=== Track listing ===
1. "Inglorious"
2. "If Life Is Like a Lovebank I Want an Overdraft"
3. "Schitzophonic"
4. "Do the Channel Bop"
5. "Geordie in Wonderland"
6. "Sky Babies"
7. "Underkill"
8. "Saddened"
9. "I Wanna Go Where the People Go (Early Version)"

== 1996 version ==
On 20 May 1996, the band issued their "authorized" expanded version of the album. Here, the tracks "If Life Is Like A Lovebank I Want An Overdraft" and "Geordie In Wonderland" were removed, as they had been featured in a double A-side single, and newly recorded material was added. "Schizophonic" was shortened and segue instrumentals added between some songs. The new material featured a new lineup in which C.J. was replaced by new guitarist/singer Jef Streatfield.

Three versions of the album were released:

=== European CD and cassette version track listing ===
1. "Inglorious"
2. "Sick of Drugs"
3. "Red Light - Green Light"
4. "Schizophonic"
5. "Soul Searching on the Planet Earth (Different Kind of Love)"
6. "Do the Channel Bop"
7. "Mood Swings and Roundabouts"
8. "In Like Flynn"
9. "Sky Babies"
10. "Nite Songs"

=== UK vinyl version track listing ===
Side 1.

1. "Inglorious"
2. "Sick of Drugs"
3. "Red Light - Green Light"
4. "In Like Flynn"

Side 2.

1. "Schizophonic"
2. "Mood Swings and Roundabouts"
3. "Do the Channel Bop"

Side 3.

1. "Beautiful Me, Beautiful You"
2. "Weekend '96"
3. "29 x The Pain '96"
4. "Johnny Wash 'N' Go"
5. "Untitled Instrumental"

Side 4.

1. "Soul Searching on the Planet Earth (Different Kind Of Love)"
2. "Sky Babies"
3. "Nite Songs"

Both UK versions ended with a loop of the band laughing. While the loop on the CD version ran to some 20 minutes, the vinyl version was recorded on the run-off in the center of the record so it would loop forever.

=== Japanese CD version track listing ===
1. "Inglorious"
2. "Sick of Drugs"
3. "Red Light - Green Light"
4. "Schitzophonic"
5. "Soul Searching on the Planet Earth (Different Kind Of Love)"
6. "Do the Channel Bop"
7. "Mood Swings and Roundabouts"
8. "In Like Flynn"
9. "Sky Babies"
10. "Nite Songs"
11. "Weekend '96"
12. "29x the Pain '96"
13. "Beautiful Me... Beautiful You"
14. "Caffeine Bomb"

A further release of the album was made in 2010 on Lemon Recordings. This double CD compiled tracks from the previous versions along with the relevant B-sides.

=== 2010 double CD version track listing ===
Disc 1

1. "Inglorious"
2. "If Life is Like a Lovebank I Want an Overdraft"
3. "Schitzophonic"
4. "Do the Channel Bop"
5. "Geordie In Wonderland"
6. "Sky Babies"
7. "Sick of Drugs"
8. "Red Light - Green Light"
9. "Soul Searching on Planet Earth (Different Kind of Love)"
10. "Mood Swings and Roundabouts"
11. "In Like Flynn"
12. "Nite Songs"

Disc 2

1. "Caffeine Bomb"
2. "Girlfriend Clothes"
3. "Shut Your Fucking Mouth and Use Your Fucking Brain"
4. "Suckerpunch"
5. "Beautiful Thing You"
6. "Two-Way Idiot Mirror"
7. "29 x the Pain"
8. "Hate the World Day"
9. "Fire Up"
