= You Do You =

You Do You may refer to:

- "You Do You", a 2020 song by Dillon Francis
- "You Do You", a 2020 song by Graace
- "You Do You", a song by Jason Mraz featuring Tiffany Haddish, from the 2020 album Look for the Good
- "You Do You", a song by The Wildhearts from the 2021 album 21st Century Love Songs
