= Honeycrack =

British rock band

- Genres: Rock
- Years active: 1992–1990s
- Label: Epic
- Spinoffs: SugarPlumFairies, Jackdaw4, The Jellys, The Bugs, The Bootleg Beatles, The Dowling Poole
- Spinoff of: The Wildhearts
- Past members: Willie Dowling; CJ; Mark McRae; Pete Clarke; Hugo Degenhardt

Honeycrack were a British rock band, formed and fronted by former Wildhearts members Willie Dowling and Chris "CJ" Jagdhar.

== History ==
CJ had first gained attention with the band Tattooed Love Boys and then became a founding member of The Wildhearts (playing second guitar and singing harmony vocals). Willie Dowling, a multi-instrumentalist, was once a member of The Grip and then joined The Wildhearts as a keyboard player for live performances and recording sessions (contributing to their debut album Earth Vs. The Wildhearts). Dowling turned down the offer to join the band permanently in order to focus on his own endeavors. In the summer of 1994, during the recording of the second Wildhearts album, CJ was sacked from the band following clashes with Wildhearts frontman Ginger. He subsequently teamed up with Dowling for a new band which became Honeycrack.

With Dowling opting to front the band on lead vocals and guitar (and CJ playing a similar role to the one he had performed with the Wildhearts), the Honeycrack line-up was completed by the addition of third guitarist Mark McCrae (previously with hotly tipped London rock band Rub Ultra), session drummer Hugo Degenhardt and bass player Pete Clarke. All members sang, providing a dense harmony vocal sound to complement the band's driving rock songs (predominantly written by Dowling and following the same pattern of rough-edged pop sensibility as those of The Wildhearts).

On the strength of their demo and the existing reputation of the members, Honeycrack signed to the Epic Records label and released their sole album, Prozaic, in 1996 (the artwork of which depicted one band member's naked parents). The album contained the singles "Go Away", "Sitting at Home", and "King of Misery". Both "Sitting at Home" (when re-issued) and "King of Misery", entered the Top 40 of the UK Singles Chart. The album enjoyed similar success in the UK Albums Chart.

After a hiatus, Honeycrack parted company with Epic, releasing the single "Anyway" on EG records. This track would later be re-recorded by Dowling and became the theme tune for the Channel 4 show Armstrong and Miller.

Although public response to the band had been fairly good, and although material was demoed for a second album (later to be known as PS The Unreleased Demos), Honeycrack split up in the late 1990s.

Willie Dowling went on to form the SugarPlumFairies (whose debut album Fruit Karma contained re-worked and re-recorded versions of songs planned for the second Honeycrack album) and the pop-rock group Jackdaw4 as well as writing songs for TV shows. C.J. formed the pop-punk outfit The Jellys (with ex-Wolfsbane bass player Jeff Hately and ex-Wildhearts drummer Stidi) and would re-join the Wildhearts in 2001. Mark McCrae, Pete Clarke and Hugo Degenhardt formed an even more short-lived band called The Bugs. Degenhardt would eventually join The Bootleg Beatles.

In 2014 Willie Dowling teamed up with Jon Poole to form The Dowling Poole.

CJ released a solo album on 4 August 2014 entitled Mable, and a second solo album entitled Robot in early 2016. Both albums were self-released and funded via the Pledgemusic crowdfunding website.

== Line-up ==
- Willie Dowling: Vocals / guitar
- CJ: Guitar / vocals
- Mark McRae: Guitar / vocals
- Pete Clarke: Bass / vocals
- Hugo Degenhardt: Drums / vocals

== Discography ==
=== Albums ===
- Prozaic (Epic 1996): UK No. 34
- PS The Unreleased Demos

=== Singles ===
- "Sitting at Home" (Epic, 1995): UK No. 42
- "Go Away" (Epic, 1996): UK No. 41
- "King of Misery" (Epic, 1996): UK No. 32
- "Sitting at Home" (re-issue) (Epic, 1996): UK No. 32
- "Anyway" (EG, 1996): UK No. 67
