= The Shredding Tears =

Studio album by Bryan Scary
- Released: October 31, 2006
- Genres: Chamber pop; indie pop; art pop; symphonic pop
- Length: 63:08
- Labels: Black & Greene Records
- Producer: Bryan Scary

Bryan Scary chronology
The Shredding Tears (2006)	Flight of the Knife (2008)

Professional ratings
Review scores
Source	Rating
Allmusic	3/5 stars
Paste	(unfavorable)
PopDiggers	(favorable)
PopMatters	(favorable)

The Shredding Tears is the debut album from the Brooklyn area indie rock artist Bryan Scary. It was released on Black and Greene Records in October 2006.

== Track listing ==
1. "A Stab At the Sun" – 4:47
2. "The Lessons I Learned" – 3:51
3. "Operaland" – 4:40
4. "The Ceiling On the Wall" – 4:23
5. "Macedonia Hotel" – 2:44
6. "The Little Engine Who Couldn't (Think Straight)" – 5:05
7. "The Up and Over Stairwell" – 5:17
8. "Shedding Tears (All Over the Place)" – 3:45
9. "Mrs. Gracy's Revenge!" – 3:49
10. "The Blood Club" – 3:32
11. "Misery Loves Company" – 4:31
12. "Bottom of the Grave" – 2:32
13. "Desdemona's Leaving Town" – 3:59
14. "The Tumbling of Marguerite/Hold On George" – 4:49
15. "Riding the Shadow" – 5:21
