= Market Harbour =

Studio album by Ginger
- Released: January 2008
- Recorded: During 2007
- Studio: Recorded: Apollo 8 and The Custard Factory Mixed: Son of Majestic Splendour
- Genre: Rock
- Length: 60:24
- Label: Round Records
- Producer: Legion

Ginger chronology
Yoni (2007)	Market Harbour (2008)	10 (2010)

Professional ratings
Review scores
Source	Rating
Sputnikmusic	link

Market Harbour is a solo album by The Wildhearts frontman Ginger Wildheart, released in January 2008 on Round Records. The LP is the third studio album by Ginger. There are no gaps between the tracks on the album - with each one segueing into another.

== Track listing ==
All tracks are written by Ginger except "The Queen of Leaving" by Ginger and Scott Sorry

No.	Title	Length
1.	"Casino Bay"	05:21
2.	"Soap Hammer"	01:31
3.	"Queen of Leaving"	03:03
4.	"Attentionette"	03:38
5.	"The Ninns of Mourning"	01:08
6.	"House of Moths"	03:13
7.	"How Hard Can You Make It?"	02:12
8.	"Awareness and the Great Integrity"	03:55
9.	"A Philosophical Conversation About Age"	00:26
10.	"Josser Bank"	02:46
11.	"Tenants"	01:08
12.	"Regret.com"	02:20
13.	"Black Yeah"	00:58
14.	"I Knew You (An Amnesis)"	04:38
15.	"You and Me (That's What I Want)"	01:51
16.	"Couple Trouble"	02:04
17.	"The Perilous Burden of Prodigal Obligation"	05:36
18.	"A Malibu Chronical"	04:01
19.	"Overeasy"	03:02
20.	"Eye of the Rotunda"	02:08
21.	"Shatterproof"	05:28
Total length:		1:00:14

Japanese edition bonus tracks
No.	Title	Length
22.	"How Legends Love" (B-side from the Casino Bay/Holiday Single)
23.	"She's So Taboo (Live)"
24.	"29 X the Pain (Live)"

Sample credits

- "Soap Hammer" features a sample from the viral internet video Kersal Massive.

== Personnel ==
Players

- Ginger – vocals, rhythm and lead guitars, bass, piano, drums, percussion, harmonica, penny flute, penny whistle, keyboards, lap steel, thunder tube, ocarina, backing vocals
- Denzel – drums, percussion, human beatbox, bass backing vocals
- Jon Poole – bass
- Jase Edwards – guitar, keyboards, bass, backing vocals
- Tim Smith – guitar, bass, string arrangements, sound effects, steel drums, backing vocals
- Chris Catalyst – programming, backing vocals, trombone
- Bernie Torme – lead guitar
- Warner E. Hodges – lead guitar
- Scott Sorry – lead vocals, backing vocals
- CJ – backing vocals
- Dick Decent – piano, bell string, lead vocals, backing vocals, sound effects
- Ben Davies – piano, Hammond organ
- Lee Small – lead vocals, backing vocals
- Vix – lead vocals
- Suzy Kirby – lead vocals
- Jake Adams – lead vocals
- Jasmine Adams – lead vocals
- Bic Hayes – backing vocals
- Joanne Spratley – backing vocals
- Tracie Hunter – backing vocals
- Phoebe White – backing vocals
- Tom Evans – violin
- Sara Longue – violin
- Harry Escott – chello [sic]
- Helen Goatley – viola
- Chris Brierly, Catherine Morgan, Mark Pharoah and Robert Woolard – string quartet

Technical

- LEGION – production, mixing

Artwork

- Tim Cook – front cover artwork
- Julia Westwood – booklet photography, artwork and design
