= Satanic Rites of the Wildhearts =

Studio album by the Wildhearts
- Released: 7 March 2025
- Studio: Treehouse (United Kingdom)
- Genre: Hard rock; heavy metal; pop rock; punk rock
- Length: 45:43
- Label: Snakefarm
- Producer: Jim Pinder

The Wildhearts chronology
21st Century Love Songs (2021)	Satanic Rites of the Wildhearts (2025)

Satanic Rites of the Wildhearts is the eleventh studio album by British rock band the Wildhearts, released on 7 March 2025 by Snakefarm Records.

== Background ==
The band's previous album 21st Century Love Songs (2021) was recorded by a reformed lineup from the Wildhearts' most successful period in the mid-1990s. That lineup split acrimoniously in 2022; band leader Ginger Wildheart took a short hiatus from the band and then assembled an entirely new lineup with former bassist Jon Poole, who had last played with the band in 2018, plus guitarist Ben Marsden and drummer Pontus Snibb.

This lineup recorded Satanic Rites of the Wildhearts in mid-2024. The album features a guest appearance by saxophonist Jørgen Munkeby on the song "I'll Be Your Monster". The album was produced by Jim Pinder. While Poole, Marsden, and Snibb had participated in warmup shows starting in early 2024, their status as official members of the WIldhearts was left secret until the album's release was announced in October 2024.

== Critical reception ==
The album received generally positive reviews. Kerrang! noted that it is not the best Wildhearts album, but it indicates a renewed focus in Ginger Wildheart's songwriting, with the magazine repeatedly calling him a "genius". Louder Than War noted "the gravity, humour, honesty and intelligence" of the lyrics, while praising Ginger as "one of the most underrated songwriters of his generation." Narc magazine called the album " throat-shreadingly heavy, imbued with glam pop stomp, and always catchy as hell." Classic Rock opined that the album is "arguably their most cohesive and complete yet." Uber Rock noted the lyrics exploring "a variety of themes, from personal struggles and societal issues to more abstract concepts of darkness and redemption," and concluded that the album has "a sense of catharsis and empowerment that runs throughout the album, making it as uplifting as it is intense."

== Track listing ==
All tracks are written by Ginger.

No.	Title	Length
1.	"Eventually"	6:15
2.	"Scared of Glass"	5:16
3.	"Troubadour Moon"	4:39
4.	"Fire in the Cheap Seats"	4:32
5.	"Kunce"	2:59
6.	"Maintain Radio Silence"	4:08
7.	"Blue Moon over Brinkburn"	3:05
8.	"Hurt People Hurt People"	3:46
9.	"I'll Be Your Monster"	3:20
10.	"Failure Is the Mother of Success"	7:46
Total length:		45:43

== Personnel ==
- Ginger Wildheart – vocals, guitars
- Jon Poole – bass, additional vocals (tracks 1, 4, 5, 7, 8, 10)
- Ben Marsden – guitars, additional guitars (tracks 1, 3, 4, 6, 7, 9, 10), additional vocals (tracks 1, 3–8, 10)
- Kavus Torabi – guitars, additional guitars (tracks 1, 2, 4, 6–10), additional vocals (1, 4, 6, 8, 10)
- Dudge – drums, additional vocals (tracks 1, 3–5, 7, 8)

Additional musicians

- Carol Hodge – additional vocals (tracks 1, 3, 5, 10), backing vocals (2)
- Gabby Horne – backing vocals (track 2)
- James Horne – backing vocals (track 2)
- Jørgen Munkeby – saxophone (track 9)
- Maggie – barking (track 9)

Technical

- Jim Pinder – production, mixing, engineering
- Carl Brown – mixing
- Ste Kerry – mastering
- Dan Fox – engineering assistance
- Eliza Pinder – additional production (track 5)

Visual

- Ginger Wildheart – hand-written lyrics, graphics, drawings
- Matt Read – design, art direction
- Andy Ford – photography
- Emily Jade Elliott – make-up

== Charts ==
Chart performance for Satanic Rites of the Wildhearts
Chart (2025)	Peak position
Scottish Albums (OCC)	4
UK Albums (OCC)	29
UK Rock & Metal Albums (OCC)	2
