= The Dowling Poole =

UK musical group

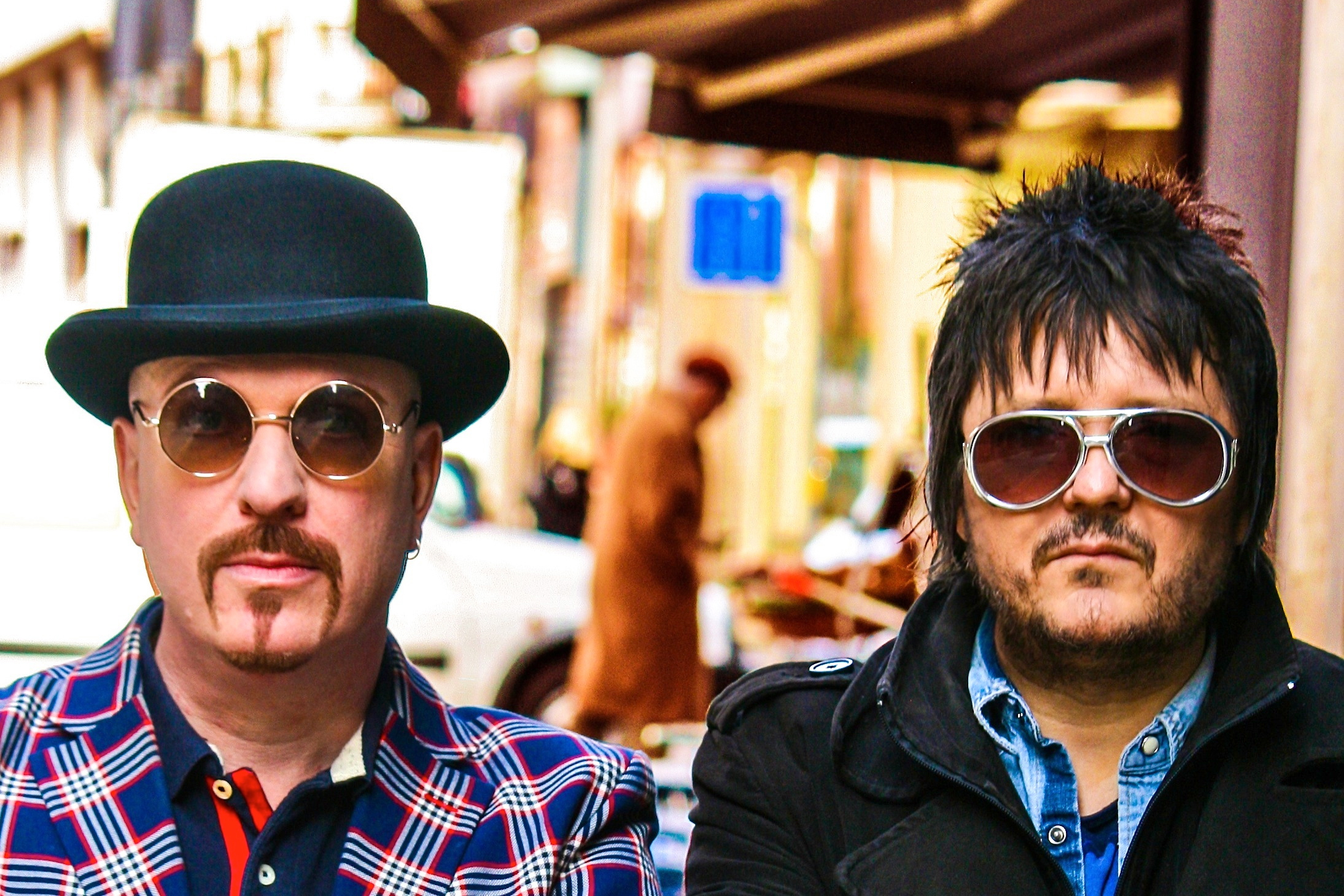
- The Dowling Poole, photo published 2016. From left to right: Jon Poole and Willie Dowling.

Background information
- Origin: London
- Genres: Power pop
- Years active: 2012–present
- Label: 369 Music
- Members: Willie Dowling; Jon Poole
- Website: thedowlingpoole.com

The Dowling Poole is an English power pop band formed in 2012 by the singers/songwriters/multi-instrumentalists Willie Dowling and Jon Poole.

Dowling originally came to public attention as frontman for London hard rock/glam metal band The Grip, going on to become keyboard player for the Wildhearts and subsequently fronting Honeycrack, Jackdaw4 and The Sugar Plum Fairies. Poole had also been a Wildhearts member (playing bass guitar for the band at various points during the 1990s) but was also well known as a former member of Cardiacs. They first started working together as the Dowling Poole in September 2012.

On the studio recordings, Dowling plays keyboards while Poole is responsible for bass and drums; both men also contribute vocals and share the songwriting equally.

Their debut album, Bleak Strategies, was released on 1 April 2014 through the Pledgemusic platform. The album saw commercial release on 11 August 2014 through 369 Music.

Album reviews were mostly positive, with Dom Lawson of Classic Rock Magazine stating that Bleak Strategies is "Flawless and exhilarating, this demands to be the soundtrack to all of our waking summer dreams" and Powerpopaholic writing "This is an essential 'do-not-miss' album, that makes my top ten list for 2014".

The band's second album, One Hyde Park, was released on 8 April 2016 to much acclaim, with The Sun awarding it 4.5/5 and commenting that "it's a great pop-rock record," and Powerplay Magazine claiming it one of the albums of the year.

In late 2019, the band digitally released "Keeping The Stupid Stupid" and "Made In Heaven" ahead of the release of their third album, See You See Me. The album was released on 28 February 2020.

== Discography ==
Albums

- Bleak Strategies (2014)
- One Hyde Park (2016)
- See You See Me (2020)
- Refuse (2022)

EPs

- Rebecca Receiving EP (2016)
- Miles Checks Out EP (2016)
- Bright Spark EP (2016)
- Deep Breath EP (2016)
- The Trump Chronicles EP (2021)

Singles

- "The Sun Is Mine" (2014, Bleak Strategies)
- "A Kiss on the Ocean" (2014, Bleak Strategies)
- "Rebecca Receiving" (2016, One Hyde Park)
- "Empires, Buildings & Acquisitions" (2017, Live Acoustic from France)
- "Optimum Delirium" (2018, Refuse)
- "Keeping the Stupid Stupid" (2019, See You See Me)
- "Made in Heaven" (2019, See You See Me)
- "Hope" (2020, See You See Me)
- "Deep Breath" (2020, Refuse)
- "Fuck You Goodbye" (2020, Refuse)
- "We Are the Noise" (2020)
- "Slow Genocide" (featuring Tony Wright) (2021)
- "Be There" (2021)
- "The Saccharine Drip" (2021)
