= Flight of the Knife =

2008 album by Bryan Scary and the Shredding Tears

Studio album by Bryan Scary and the Shredding Tears
- Released: April 1, 2008
- Genres: Art rock; pop; power pop
- Labels: Black & Greene Records
- Producer: Brian McTear

Bryan Scary and the Shredding Tears chronology
The Shredding Tears (2007)	Flight of the Knife (2008)	Mad Valentines (2009)

Flight of the Knife is the second album by the American indie rock artist Bryan Scary and the Shredding Tears. It is the group's first album as a full band, as the previous album The Shredding Tears had been a solo effort primarily composed by Bryan Scary. It was released on Black and Greene Records in April 2008, and rereleased by Needlejuice Records on vinyl and cassette in October 2020.

== Musical and lyrical themes ==
Flight of the Knife is a concept album centering on the character of Airship Valentine and his mission to pilot The Knife, an airship referred to as "the greatest flying machine ever to take the skies." The album is also heavily influenced by Thomas Pynchon's 2005 novel, Against the Day.

== Reception ==
Professional ratings
Review scores
Source	Rating
Allmusic	4/5 stars
Pitchfork Media	(6.6/10)

Named an "Editors Pick" on iTunes, Flight of the Knife was ranked the #6 rock album on iTunes and in the top 30 albums overall.

The album received generally favorable reviews, many noting the album's varied musical influences. Pitchfork Media stated that Flight of the Knife "sucks in all kinds of 1970s – the canonic glitter-rock of Sparks and Queen, the MOR pop of Wings and ELO, and the fleet-fingered prog of Yes and early Genesis – but its crafty construction betrays a staunch determination to make a whole decade of once-guilty pleasures feel innocent all over again." Allmusic notes the album's improvement from its predecessor, adding "whereas Scary's songs on the debut sometimes sounded like they were overtly indebted to those influences and predecessors, the far more cohesive Flight of the Knife is more like a patchwork quilt where some of the fabric scraps are immediately identifiable – check the Beach Boys-go-Devo pastiche in the second half of 'The Purple Rocket'! – but they're arranged in a harmonious and unique whole."

== Track listing ==
1. "Flight of the Knife (Pt I) – 5:38
2. "Venus Ambassador" – 4:21
3. "Imitation of the Sky" – 4:03
4. "La Madame on the Moon" – 2:43
5. "The Fire-Tree Bird" – 3:57
6. "The Curious Disappearance of the Sky-Ship Thunder-Man" – 4:49
7. "The Purple Rocket" – 4:15
8. "The Zero Light" – 5:17
9. "Mama Waits" – 2:45
10. "Son of Stab" – 3:35
11. "Heaven on a Bird" – 4:48
12. "Flight of the Knife (Pt II)" – 3:35
