= A Break in the Weather =

Compilation album by Ginger
- Released: 31 January 2005
- Recorded: 2001–2005
- Genre: Rock
- Length: 1:02:54
- Label: Castle
- Producer: Ginger

Ginger chronology
The Great White Monkey (2004)	A Break in the Weather (2005)	Valor Del Corazon (2006)

A Break in the Weather is a compilation album released by Ginger (of The Wildhearts) that collects together all the tracks from the first five releases from the ill-fated "Singles Club," of which there were originally going to be one single released each month for twelve months. The final three tracks are from the 6th single that was recorded but remained previously unreleased.

== Tracks listing ==
All songs written by Ginger.

Disc 1:

1. "I'm A Lover Not A Fighter" (4:34)
2. "Don't Let Me Die Lonely" (3:59)
3. "Thailand Uber Alles" (3:26)
4. "Cars And Vaginas" (3:17)
5. "You Me And BT" (2:45)
6. "Not Bitter Just A Little Disappointed" (2:34)
7. "This Time I'm Serious" (4:23)
8. "Reinventing The Wheel" (3:37)
9. "Blinded By Absinthe" (3:21)

Disc: 2

1. "Saga Of Me And You" (3:44)
2. "Naked Innocence" (2:31)
3. "Better Man" (3:45)
4. "Virtual Love" (5:05)
5. "Energetic O" (3:45)
  - According to the accompanying sleeve notes, the song is about masturbation, the "O" denoting orgasm.
6. "Where Did Everyone Go?" (1:56)
7. "TWAT" (3:33)
8. "He's A Man" (2:56)
9. "Dying Art Of The Chorus" (3:43)
  - Features "growls" by Mark "Barney" Greenway of the Death metal group Napalm Death.

The five "Singles Club" releases are represented on this compilation by tracks 1, 4 and 7 on Disc 1 and tracks 1 and 4 on Disc 2. The two tracks following each of these tracks represent the b-sides that were included on each release.
