= Albion (Ginger Wildheart album) =

2013 studio album by Ginger Wildheart

Studio album by Ginger Wildheart
- Released: 23 December 2013
- Venues: Pen Y Lan studios, Meifod
- Genre: Rock
- Label: Cargo / Round Records
- Producer: Kevin Vanbergen

Ginger Wildheart chronology
555% (2012)	Albion (2013)	Year of the Fanclub (2015)

Alternative cover
- Cover used for the commercial release of the album

Albion is the fifth solo studio album by British singer-songwriter Ginger Wildheart, frontman of rock band The Wildhearts. Albion was first released via the PledgeMusic platform as a 15-track LP. It came following the success of Ginger's 2012 album 555%.

A commercial ten-track version was later released via Cargo Records and Round Records. The album, which was originally going to be titled Practical Musician, was recorded in 2013, and a blog of the album sessions was published online.

== Critical reception ==
Classic Rock described Albion as "spinetingling" and gave it four out of five stars. Drowned in Sound gave the album 7 out of 10 stars, calling it "another step on Ginger’s loveably tumultuous, often volatile, refreshingly bittersweet and often transcendental musical journey."

== Track listing ==
All tracks are written by Ginger, except where noted.

Pledge edition
No.	Title	Length
1.	"Drive"	4:52
2.	"Cambria"	4:25
3.	"The Road to Applecross"	3:46
4.	"The Order of the Dog" (Ginger, Chris Catalyst)	6:23
5.	"Chill Motherfucker, Chill"	4:18
6.	"Burn This City Down" (Ginger, Chris Catalyst)	4:27
7.	"Body Parts"	2:29
8.	"The Beat Goes On (Caledonia)"	4:16
9.	"After All You Said About Cowboys"	3:46
10.	"Grow a Pair"	4:22
11.	"I Need You"	5:17
12.	"Capital Anxiety"	1:58
13.	"Into This"	4:07
14.	"Creepers" (Ginger, Ian Hardwick)	6:35
15.	"Albion" (Ginger, Jon Poole, Kevin Vanbergen, Victoria Liedtke)	10:26
Total length:		1:11:29

Commercial version

No.	Title	Length
1.	"Drive"	4:52
2.	"Cambria"	4:25
3.	"Grow a Pair"	4:22
4.	"Burn This City Down" (Ginger, Chris Catalyst)	4:27
5.	"The Order of the Dog" (Ginger, Chris Catalyst)	6:23
6.	"Body Parts"	2:29
7.	"The Beat Goes On (Caledonia)"	4:16
8.	"After All You Said About Cowboys"	3:46
9.	"Creepers" (Ginger, Ian Hardwick)	6:35
10.	"Albion" (Ginger, Jon Poole, Kevin Vanbergen, Victoria Liedtke)	10:26
Total length:		52:02

== Personnel ==
- Ginger Wildheart – vocals, guitars
- Chris Catalyst – vocals, guitars, percussion, bass, harmonium
- Denzel – drums
- Rich Jones – guitars, vocals
- Victoria Liedtke – vocals
- Random Jon Poole – bass, guitar, vocals, keyboards
- Bryan Scary – piano, harmonium, vocals and string arrangements
