= 555% =

Studio album by Ginger Wildheart
- Released: 23 March – 6 April 2012 (Download); May 2012 (CD)
- Recorded: October 2011 – January 2012
- Genre: Rock, pop, hard rock, dance-pop, electropop, synthpop
- Length: 2:09:15
- Language: English
- Label: Round Records

Ginger Wildheart chronology
10 (2010)	555% (2012)	Albion (2013)

555% is the fourth solo album by the English rock musician Ginger Wildheart. The full album of thirty tracks was only available online for a limited time; a 12-track version of the album titled 100% has been released commercially.

== Background ==
The album was recorded over three sessions in England, France, and Denmark during October 2011 and January 2012. Funding for the recording of the album was raised by Ginger's Triple Album Project managed through PledgeMusic. When the project raised significantly more money than Ginger had estimated would be required to record the album, he announced that the album would be titled 555% when donations reached that percentage of the original goal. The success of the fundraising effort encouraged Ginger to make extra songs available online while offering special CD and vinyl packages to contributors. Via the PledgeMusic website, persons who pledged money to the project were allowed to download completed tracks before they were released in other forms.

The first track to be made available for download by pledgers was the rough mix of "You're The One, You're The One, Yeah, I Know You're The One, You're The One (Yeah I Know You're The One)." The thirty tracks recorded for the project were made available to pledgers in three batches of ten, on 23 March, 30 March, and 6 April 2012 respectively. On each date, the tracks were made available at 5:55 pm England time.

=== 555% Track listing ===
All tracks are written by Ginger, except where noted.

CD1
No.	Title	Length
1.	"Forget About It"	3:17
2.	"I-N-T-E-R-N-A-L R-adio" (Ginger/Taylor Granley)	4:35
3.	"Lie When You Tell Me the Truth"	3:45
4.	"Incidental Noises"	3:19
5.	"It Appears That the Party Is Over" (Ginger/Willie Dowling)	3:33
6.	"Deep in the Arms of Morpheus"	6:20
7.	"Baby Skies"	5:48
8.	"Silence"	3:48
9.	"Powderkeg"	4:09
10.	"Time" (Ginger/Jon Poole/Chris Catalyst)	7:39
Total length:		46:09

CD2
No.	Title	Length
1.	"Another Spinning Fucking Rainbow" (Ginger/Jon Poole/Chris Catalyst)	5:25
2.	"Westward Ho! (A New Reputation)" (Ginger/Willie Dowling)	4:08
3.	"Do the Lonely Suffer More, or Less, or Just the Same at the Point of Death?"	4:04
4.	"The Other Side"	3:56
5.	"Strange New Year"	2:48
6.	"Lover, It'll All Work Out" (Ginger/Willie Dowling)	4:00
7.	"Illuminating Times"	4:13
8.	"Begin From Within"	4:44
9.	"Return of the Northern Cardinal"	5:29
10.	"Taste Aversion" (Ginger/Jon Poole/Treeman)	5:22
Total length:		44:19

CD3
No.	Title	Length
1.	"You're The One, You're The One, Yeah, I Know You're The One, You're The One (Yeah I Know You're The One)"	3:40
2.	"Beautifully, Blissfully Unsettled"	4:01
3.	"Confusion"	2:57
4.	"Sleeping in the Light"	3:39
5.	"In Vino Veritas"	7:52
6.	"Very, Very Slow"	1:22
7.	"Just Another Song About Someone"	4:13
8.	"There Is Something Wrong with My Mind"	3:30
9.	"We've Been Expecting You" (Ginger/Willie Dowling)	2:56
10.	"The End"	4:47
Total length:		39:00

== 100% ==
Persons who downloaded tracks from the PledgeMusic site were encouraged to vote for their three favorite songs out of each batch of ten with Ginger adding his three favorites. The twelve resulting songs were selected for the commercial version of the album, titled 100% and released in May 2012. The other eighteen tracks are now unavailable on CD but can be purchased as downloads via Ginger's official Bandcamp page.

100% reached No. 9 on the UK midweek album chart on 27 June 2012.

=== 100% Track listing ===
No.	Title	Length
1.	"Forget About It"	3:17
2.	"I-N-T-E-R-N-A-L R-adio"	4:35
3.	"Lover, It'll All Work Out"	4:00
4.	"You're The One, You're The One, Yeah, I Know You're The One, You're The One (Yeah I Know You're The One)"	3:40
5.	"It Appears That the Party Is Over"	3:33
6.	"Taste Aversion"	5:22
7.	"Another Spinning Fucking Rainbow"	5:25
8.	"Just Another Song About Someone"	4:13
9.	"Westward Ho! (A New Reputation)"	4:08
10.	"Beautifully, Blissfully Unsettled"	4:01
11.	"We've Been Expecting You"	2:56
12.	"Time"	7:39

== Personnel ==
According to updates on the PledgeMusic website, the following personnel took part in the sessions:

- Ginger – vocals, guitar
- "Random" Jon Poole – bass, vocals
- Chris Catalyst – Guitar, Bass, vocals
- Denzel – drums (CD1 – tracks 1, 2 & 10, CD2 – tracks 1, 4, 8 & 10, CD3 – tracks 6, 7 & 10)
- Fyfe Ewing – drums (CD1 – tracks 4, 5 & 9, CD2 – tracks 3, 6, 7 & 9, CD3 – tracks 3, 4 & 8)
- Ritch Battersby – drums (CD1 – tracks 3, 6, 7 & 8, CD2 – tracks 2 & 5, CD3 – tracks 1, 2, 5 & percussion on 9)
- Willie Dowling – keyboards CD1 track 3, 4, 5, & 9 CD2 track 2, 3, 5, 6 7 & 9 CD3 track 1, 3, 4, 6 8 & 9, Guitars, vocals
- CJ – guitar, vocals (CD1 – tracks 6, 7 & 8)
- Victoria Liedtke – vocals
- Laila K – vocals (CD2 – track 2)
- Jase Edwards – Guitar (CD2 track 6 and CD3 track 6 – guitar solo)
- Kim Olesen – Keyboards on CD1 track 1, 2, 6, 7, 8 & 10. CD2 track 1, 4, 8 & 10 CD3 track 2, 5, 7 & 10.

Production team

- Willie Dowling – producer, mixing (produced 15 Songs, mixed 13 songs)
- Jacob Hansen – producer, mixing (15 Songs)
- Jase Edwards – mixing (2 songs)
- Jon Astley – mastering
