= Hey! Hello! =

Power pop band

- Origin: Newcastle, England / New York City
- Genres: Power pop
- Years active: 2012–present
- Labels: Round (UK), Vinyl Junkie (Japan), The End (USA)
- Members: Ginger Wildheart; The Rev; Toshi; Ai Sugiyama; Cat Southall
- Past members: Victoria Liedtke; Hollis Mahady
- Website: heyhello.net

Hey! Hello! are an international power pop band, formed by the English singer-songwriter, Ginger Wildheart. The band's initial incarnation for the debut album consisted of Ginger Wildheart and New York City-based singer Victoria Liedtke. Liedtke was replaced by Love Zombies singer Hollis Mahady in 2015, with Toshi, Ai Sugiyama and The Rev joining the lineup. Mahady left the band in 2016, and auditions were held to replace her. According to Ginger, the band's name was chosen by his son, who had misheard the Ramones lyric "Hey Ho, Let's Go".

The self-titled debut album was recorded throughout 2012, with Ginger playing drums, bass and guitars as well as contributing vocals. His parts were recorded by Russ Russell before being sent to New York, for Liedtke to add her vocals with engineering assistance from Bryan Scary.

In November 2012, the band released "How I Survived The Punk Wars", which was championed by Duff McKagan who commented in his Seattle weekly blog that "It's perhaps the best and most real punk rock song in a long, long time. It actually stunned me."

Their debut self-titled album was commercially released on 22 July 2013 in the UK, to critical acclaim with The Sun newspaper awarding it 4.5 out of 5 and AllMusic commenting "This combination of melody and drive makes for an album that's ridiculously big, overblown, and super fun". It went to number 1 in the UK Rock Chart on 28 July 2013. The album's cover was designed by artist Frank Kozik.

They toured the UK supporting The Wildhearts in 2014. In January 2015, the band announced several shows including a set at Download Festival.

The band recorded a second album, Hey! Hello! Too!, which was released on 23 September 2016.
