= Black and Greene Records =

Independent record label

- Founded: 2004
- Founder: David Greene; Jeremy Black
- Genre: Rock
- Country of origin: United States
- Location: Los Angeles, California
- Official website: blackandgreenerecords.com

Black and Greene Records is an independent record label that was founded in 2004 by David Greene and Jeremy Black (Apollo Sunshine). Black & Greene Records is located and operated out of Los Angeles, California and San Francisco. The label works exclusively with Coyote Hearing Studios co-run by Jeremy Black. The label's bands have been showcased on HBO's Eastbound & Down and 90210.

== Discography ==
- BG001: Apollo Sunshine: Katonah LP (180 Gram vinyl pressing)
- BG002: Apollo Sunshine: S/T LP (2xLP vinyl pressing)
- BG003: White Flight: S/T LP (2xLP gatefold edition)
- BG701: White Flight: S/T 45" (45" EXPORT to UK)
- BG004: Bryan Scary: The Shredding Tears LP (CD)
- BG005: Self Righteous Brothers: In Loving Memory LP (CD and Vinyl)
- BG006: Drug Rug; S/T (CD and Vinyl)
- BG007: Bryan Scary & The Shredding Tears: Flight of the Knife (CD and Vinyl)
- BG008: Drug Rug : Paint the Fence Invisible (CD and Vinyl)
- BG701: White Flight (band) : Timeshaker 45" (/500 7" records)
- BG702: Netherfriends : Feathers & Dots EP (vinyl)

== See also ==
- List of record labels
