= Clam Abuse =

Clam Abuse was the title of a collaborative side project of Ginger, of The Wildhearts, and Alex Kane, of Life, Sex & Death. The band also featured The Prodigy's live-drummer Kieron Pepper.

Ginger and Kane, who assumed the alter egos of 'Clam Savage' and 'Clint Abuse' respectively for the project, are said to have met and formed the band whilst on drug rehabilitation ("the bucket"). Their collaboration yielded only one album, entitled Stop Thinking (1999; re-issued 2003 and 2005), which included a cover of The Partridge Family's "I Think I Love You".

Recorded just outside Milton Keynes, lyrics and backing vocals were aided by Jay Butler (formerly of 'Grand Theft Audio) and Simon Barnes (T.V presenter and Human Cannonball)

In an interview Ginger stressed that the only reason he and Kane formed was because he had filed for bankruptcy in the United States after "pissing it away on drinks and drugs", and made an album to take back to the UK, supporting it with a tour to make money. He had no idea that the tour, and the band, would be so popular.

Kane went on to form his own band, AntiProduct, in the UK.

== Discography ==
Stop Thinking

Studio album by Clam Abuse
- Released: 1999
- Recorded: 1999
- Studio: Great Linford Manor Studios
- Genre: Weird Pop
- Label: Infernal
- Producers: Clint Abuse & Clam Savage

Stop Thinking (1999)
Track listing

1. "Sing Like a Girl"
2. "I Think I Love You"
3. "Message to Geri"
4. "Unlucky in Love"
5. ".com Together"
6. "Falling in Bed with You Again"
7. "Sunday Driving on a Thursday Afternoon"
8. "For That Girl Everything Is Groovy"
9. "Barney Sings the Blues"
10. "She's So Taboo"
11. "There's Always Someone More Fucked Up Than You"

Bonus-tracks (not all editions)

1. "I Think I Love You" [remix]
2. "Message to Geri" [remix]
3. "She's So Taboo" [remix]
