= Valor Del Corazon =

Studio album by Ginger
- Released: 19 December 2005 (Order online); 9 January 2006 (Shops)
- Recorded: 2005
- Genre: Rock
- Length: 1:19:31
- Label: Round Records
- Producer: Ginger, Ralph Jezzard

Ginger chronology
A Break In The Weather (2005)	Valor Del Corazon (2005)	Yoni (2007)

Valor Del Corazon is the first solo album to be released by Ginger (of rock band The Wildhearts). It initially had a limited mail order release on 19 December 2005, with a full release to the shops on 9 January 2006 and features 19 tracks spread across two CDs. The album was produced by Ralph Jezzard, who had previously produced the Wildhearts album Endless, Nameless.

The earliest editions of the album can be identified by a "V" placed on the back cover photograph and Valor spelt "Vaolr" on the side of the album case.

== Track listing ==
All tracks are written by Ginger Wildheart.

Disc one
No.	Title	Length
1.	"Ugly"	2:37
2.	"Mother City"	3:37
3.	"G.T.T."	4:08
4.	"Yeah, Yeah, Yeah"	4:21
5.	"This Is Only A Problem"	3:52
6.	"Ten Flaws Down"	7:10
7.	"Paramour"	2:26
8.	"The Man Who Cheated Death"	4:29
Total length:		32:40

Disc two
No.	Title	Length
1.	"The Drunken Lord Of Everything"	2:50
2.	"L.O.V.E."	5:36
3.	"The Way"	3:58
4.	"Drinking In The Daytime"	6:28
5.	"Keep It Cool"	6:02
6.	"Only Lonely"	4:35
7.	"Your Mouth"	2:22
8.	"Change"	2:41
9.	"My Friend The Enemy"	5:28
10.	"Bulb"	3:52
11.	"Something To Believe In"	2:59
Total length:		46:51

Japanese edition bonus tracks
No.	Title	Length
12.	"Sonic Shake (Live)"	8:46
13.	"Answering Machine (Live)" (The Replacements cover)	3:36
14.	"Boys Keep Swinging (Live)" (David Bowie cover)	3:37

== The title ==
Before the album's release, Ginger announced that its title, Valor Del Corazon, was Spanish for "strength of heart". On his website, he comments on what appears to be a grammatical error:

"I have Spanish and Mexican friends and I obviously asked them for the correct way of translating that title literally. They all told me that the proper way to say it is Valor DE Corazon. Thing is, I woke up one morning with the title right in my face, and while I know it isn't text book Spanish, I was getting tons of spiritual information, divine support and genuine paranormal weirdness around me. So much so that I took it for granted that this was completely natural within the whole 'fixing yourself' process. Anyway, I wasn't going to argue with an album title given to me from sources beyond my surroundings. So, as illiterate as it may read to my Spanish speaking fans I stuck with it!"
