= Adrian Perry =

Australian rules footballer

Personal information
- Full name: Adrian Perry
- Born: 9 May 1941 (age 85)
- Original team: Parkside
- Height: 180 cm (5 ft 11 in)
- Weight: 81 kg (179 lb)
- Position: Defence

Playing career^{1}
Years	Club	Games (Goals)
1960–1965	North Melbourne	41 (0)
- ^{1} Playing statistics correct to the end of 1965.

Adrian Perry (born 9 May 1941) is a former Australian rules footballer who played for the North Melbourne Football Club in the Victorian Football League (VFL).
