= Potatoes & You =

Live album by Ginger
- Released: 2005
- Recorded: 2005
- Genre: Rock

Potatoes & You is an acoustic live album by the Wildhearts frontman Ginger. It was recorded at TJ's in Newport, Wales, during an acoustic tour in 2005. The album was originally only available to buy at shows, but can now be downloaded at Ginger's official Bandcamp page.

== Track listing ==
1. "Loveshit"
2. "Show A Little Emotion"
3. "Someone That Wont Let Me Go"
4. "So Into You"
5. "Weekend"
6. "News Of The World / So Into You Reprise"
7. "Some Rehearsed Improvisation"
8. "One Love, One Life, One Girl"
9. "Inside Out"
10. "In Lilly's Garden" / "Someone That Wont Let Me Go"
11. "Unlucky In Love" feat. guest vocalist Givvi Flynn
12. "Just In Lust"
13. "Bad Time To Be Having A Bad Time"
14. "Only One Hell"
15. "Looking For The One"
16. "Shame On Me"

All songs written by Ginger unless noted otherwise.
