= The Great White Monkey =

Live album by Ginger
- Released: 2004
- Recorded: Rugeley Rose Theatre, 27 September 2003
- Genre: Rock
- Label: Round Records
- Producer: Jase Edwards

The Great White Monkey is an acoustic live album that was available to buy at acoustic performances by The Wildhearts frontman Ginger. The album was recorded at the Rugeley Rose Theatre in Staffordshire England on 27 September 2003. The show itself consisted of two sets (the band deciding to support themselves), however the recording was a single CD that was one condensed set featuring a mixture of tracks from both sets. The album proved incredibly popular, with early copies of the album fetching over £80 on eBay. An expanded 2-CD version containing both sets was released by Round Records on 1 June 2009.

== Track listing ==
All songs written by Ginger unless noted otherwise.

1. "Geordie in Wonderland"
2. "Sky Chaser High"
3. "Nita Nitro"
4. "One Love, One Life, One Girl"
5. "Inside Out"
6. "Hocus Pocus" (Focus)
7. "The Daftness"
8. "Reinventing the Wheel"
9. "I'm a Lover Not a Fighter"
10. "There's Only One Hell"
11. "Ltd" (Jon Poole)
12. "Dangerlust"
13. "Cheers" (Judy Hart Angelo/Gary Portnoy)
14. "Does Your Mother Know" (ABBA)
15. "Sky Babies / Space Oddity" (Ginger / David Bowie)
16. "I Wanna Go Where the People Go"

== Credits ==
- Ginger – vocals, guitar
- Jon Poole – vocals, guitar
- Hot Steve – guitars
- Recorded, Mixed and Mastered by Jase Edwards
