= Silver Ginger 5 =

Silver Ginger 5 was originally formed in 1999 as a solo project for Ginger, lead singer-songwriter of The Wildhearts.

The band was not formed until after the recording of the album Black Leather Mojo, and despite the name only ever had 4 members. The name itself, according to Ginger, came from his trying to reassure himself in an uncertain time of his life; as he considered silver his lucky colour, and five his lucky number, he figured surrounding himself with luck would be a good move.

== Albums ==
- Black Leather Mojo (2000)

Ginger has repeatedly stated that the band wrote a second Silver Ginger 5 album, but have not yet managed to find the time in their individual schedules to record it.

The Great White Monkey – live album

== Tours ==
The band has played numerous live shows, with a revolving line-up, which has included the following members:

- Ginger – vocals, guitar
- "Random" Jon Poole – bass
- Conny Bloom – lead guitar, vocals
- Tomas Broman – drums
- Ritch Battersby – drums
- Andy Selway – drums on the studio album
