= Sick of Drugs =

Single by The Wildhearts
- Released: April 1996
- Genre: Rock
- Label: Warner Music

The Wildhearts singles chronology
"Just in Lust" (1995)	"Sick of Drugs" (1996)	"Red Light – Green Light EP" (1995)

"Sick of Drugs" is a 1996 single by the Wildhearts. The song peaked at No. 14 on the UK singles chart, the highest chart position achieved by the band. The band played the song on Top of the Pops shortly after its release, but their performance was cut short, prompting frontman Ginger to sing the final line: "If you wanna hear the rest of the song, go and buy the single."

A limited edition CD was available which came with a green mat which when watered sprouted grass.

== Track listing ==
1. "Sick of Drugs"
2. "Underkill"
3. "Bad Time To Be Having A Bad Time"
4. "Sky Chaser High"
