= Earth vs the Wildhearts =

Studio album by the Wildhearts
- Released: 30 August 1993
- Recorded: November–December 1992
- Studios: Wessex (London); Mayfair (London)
- Genres: Hard rock; alternative rock; glam punk; power pop
- Length: 49:21
- Labels: East West; Bronze
- Producers: The Wildhearts; Mike "Spike" Drake; Mark Dodson; Simon Efemey

The Wildhearts chronology
Earth vs the Wildhearts (1993)	Fishing for Luckies (1994)

Earth vs the Wildhearts is the debut studio album by British rock band the Wildhearts, released in 1993. The title is based on such B-movie titles as Earth vs. the Flying Saucers and Earth vs. the Spider.

The album has been reissued twice: first in 1994 with the addition of the formerly single-only track "Caffeine Bomb", and again in 2010 with several B-sides from the period.

== Recording ==
Mick Ronson contributed one of the three guitar solos on "My Baby Is a Headfuck". This is believed to be Ronson's final appearance on record before his death on 29 April 1993. "We had the song 'My Baby Is a Headfuck' and it wasn't that great," recalled Ginger, "but we thought, 'If we can get Ronson to play a solo on it, then it'll work'… And Ronson wasn't around for very long, but I take solace in that it was the last of his recordings you got to hear… We got him to do one more take of the song because we didn't want him to stop playing. He nailed it the first time; we just wanted to listen to him."

Sarah Cutts and Stevie Lange guested on the album at the request of the band, who wished to have a member of Cardiacs and the woman who sang the jingle for the 1990s Bodyform advert.

The breakdown on "My Baby Is a Headfuck" uses the riff from the Beatles' "Day Tripper".

== Reception and legacy ==
Professional ratings
Review scores
Source	Rating
AllMusic	4/5 stars
Collector's Guide to Heavy Metal	9/10
Record Collector	5/5 stars
Select	2/5

Earth vs the Wildhearts was voted the best album of 1993 by Kerrang! magazine in their yearly poll. In 2006, Kerrang! rated it No. 20 in a special publication of the best Rock Albums. Billy Morrison of Camp Freddy and Circus Diablo states that Earth vs the Wildhearts is one of his favourite albums of all time.

On the 15th anniversary of the album's release, in 2008, the Wildhearts toured, playing the original version of the album in its entirety. On its 20th anniversary, in 2013, the Wildhearts reformed for a tour in which the original version of the album was played in its entirety nightly, followed by a second set of songs chosen by the audience. One of the gigs on that tour, at Rock City in Nottingham, was recorded for the 2014 live album, Rock City vs the Wildhearts. In 2018, the band went on a short tour playing the album in full, for its 25th anniversary.

== Track listing ==
All tracks are written by Ginger.

No.	Title	Length
1.	"Greetings from Shitsville"	4:32
2.	"TV Tan"	4:30
3.	"Everlone"	6:30
4.	"Shame on Me"	3:58
5.	"Caffeine Bomb" (reissue only)	2:39
6.	"Loveshit"	3:57
7.	"The Miles Away Girl"	5:37
8.	"My Baby Is a Headfuck"	4:27
9.	"Suckerpunch"	2:59
10.	"News of the World"	5:49
11.	"Drinking About Life"	2:03
12.	"Love U Til I Don't"	5:04

Japanese edition bonus tracks
No.	Title	Length
12.	"Show a Little Emotion"	3:02
13.	"Down on London"	4:39

2010 reissue bonus disc
No.	Title	Length
1.	"Nothing Ever Changes but the Shoes" (from the Mondo Akimbo a-Go-Go mini-album)	5:40
2.	"Crying Over Nothing" (from the Mondo Akimbo a-Go-Go mini-album)	3:50
3.	"Turning American" (from the Mondo Akimbo a-Go-Go mini-album)	6:24
4.	"Liberty Cap" (from the Mondo Akimbo a-Go-Go mini-album)	4:18
5.	"Splattermania" (from the Don't Be Happy... Just Worry mini-album)	4:07
6.	"Something Weird Is Going on in My Head" (from the Don't Be Happy... Just Worry mini-album)	4:51
7.	"Weekend (5 Long Days)" (from the Don't Be Happy... Just Worry mini-album)	4:25
8.	"Dreaming in A" (from the Don't Be Happy... Just Worry mini-album)	3:31
9.	"And the Bullshit Goes On" (B-side)	5:23
10.	"Show a Little Emotion" (B-side)	3:03
11.	"Dangerlust" (B-side)	6:16
12.	"Down on London" (B-side)	4:40

== Personnel ==
Credits adapted from liner notes.

The Wildhearts

- Stidi
- Ginger
- Danny
- CJ

Additional musicians

- Willie Dowling – piano, keyboards
- Ritch Battersby – drums on "Caffeine Bomb"
- Stevie Lange – backing vocals on "Loveshit"
- Mick Ronson – guitar solo on "My Baby Is a Headfuck"
- Sarah Smith – saxophone on "Greetings from Shitsville"

Production

- The Wildhearts – production
- Mike "Spike" Drake – mixing, production
- Ted Jensen – mastering
- KK – engineering
- Mark Dodson – engineering, mixing and production on "Suckerpunch"
- Simon Efemey – production on "Caffeine Bomb"
- Ian Huffam – engineering on "Suckerpunch"

Visual

- Marcel Leilenhof – front cover photography
- Steve Double – band photography
- Hunt Emerson – illustration
- Jonathon Cooke and Borkur Arnarson – Blue Source sleeve
- Shoal – art direction
