= Black Leather Mojo =

Studio album by SilverGinger 5
- Released: June 26, 2000
- Recorded: 1999
- Genre: Rock
- Length: 58:34
- Label: Universal Music Group
- Producer: Tim Smith

Professional ratings
Review scores
Source	Rating
AllMusic	3.5/5 stars

Black Leather Mojo is the debut album released in 2000 by British Rock band Silver Ginger 5. Notably, the album was produced by Tim Smith of the Cardiacs, whom group frontman Ginger counted as one of his biggest influences. It was claimed by Ginger himself in an interview with Kerrang! magazine, that the audition for Wildhearts bassist Danny McCormack consisted of taking LSD and attending a Cardiacs concert. The link with the Cardiacs continued with the group's guitarist Jon Poole playing bass on Black Leather Mojo.

The album was released in Japan in 2000, with a UK release happening a year later on independent label Infernal Records. (The label was run by former Kerrang! journalist and EastWest A&R man Dante Bonutto, who had worked with Ginger on a number of occasions during the Wildhearts EastWest years.)

== Track listing ==
Japanese Version

1. Sonic Shake
2. Divine Imperfection
3. Anyway But Maybe
4. Girls Are Better Than Boys
5. Brain Sugar
6. (Whatever Happened To) Rock 'N' Roll Girls
7. Monkey Zoo
8. Inside Out
9. I Wanna Be New
10. Church Of The Broken Hearted
11. Take It All Why Don't'cha
12. Too Many Hippies (In The Garden Of Love)
13. Doggin'
14. To Love Somebody (Bee Gees cover)

UK 2 Disc Version

CD1

1. Sonic Shake
2. Divine Imperfection
3. Anyway But Maybe
4. Girls Are Better Than Boys
5. Brain Sugar
6. (Whatever Happened To) Rock 'N' Roll Girls
7. Monkey Zoo
8. Too Many Hippies (In The Garden Of Love)
9. Inside Out
10. I Wanna Be New
11. Church Of The Broken Hearted
12. Take It All Why Don't'cha

CD2

1. I Wanna Be New (Live)
2. Divine Imperfection (Live)
3. Motorvate (Live)
4. Star / Groovus Maximus (Live)
5. He's A Whore (Live)
6. Inglorious (Live)
7. Too Many Hippies (In The Garden Of Love) (Live)
8. Medley: Nita Nitro / Eastenders Theme / Prince Charming / Stand And Deliver / I Just Called To Say... 'Zimbabwe' / Voices (Live - Acoustic)
9. Love U Til I Don't (Live - Acoustic)
10. Don't Worry 'Bout Me (Live - Acoustic)
11. I Wanna Go Where The People Go (Live -Acoustic)
12. Greetings From Shitsville (Live - Acoustic)
13. Walk Like A Motherfucker (Demo)
14. More Is The Law (Demo)
15. Last Bastard In Heaven (Demo)
- A 2 Disc version of the album was re-issued by Castle on 28 March 2005 with the track listing/artwork of the original Japanese album along with the second disc of live performances and demos from the first UK release.

== Credits ==
- Ginger - vocals, guitar
- "Random" Jon Poole - bass, vocals
- Bladz - drums
- Conny Bloom - guitar
