= Ginger Wildheart =

British rock musician

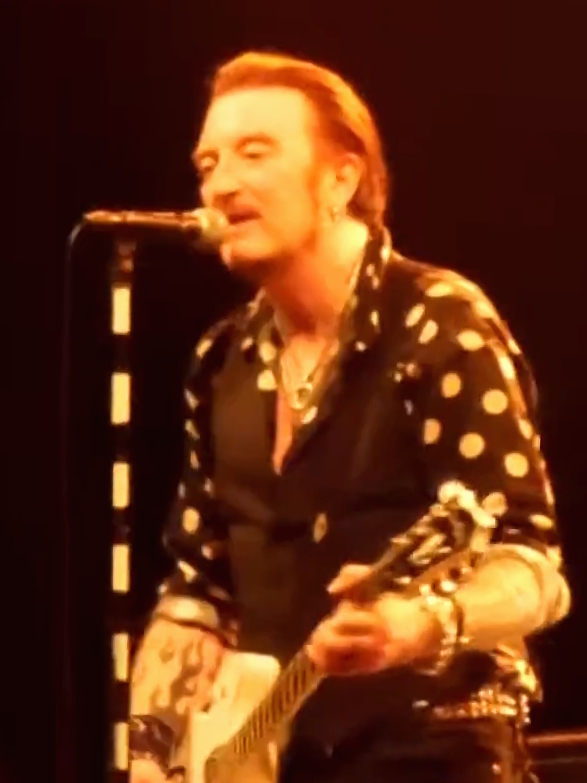
- Ginger performing with the Wildhearts at Tsutaya O-East in November 2015
- Born: David Leslie Walls; 17 December 1964 (age 61); South Shields, England
- Occupations: Singer; musician; songwriter
- Children: Jazmin Bean
- Musical career
- Also known as: Ginger
- Genre: Rock
- Instruments: Guitar; vocals
- Years active: 1989–present
- Labels: Infernal; Round; Castle; Graphite; Wicked Cool
- Member of: The Wildhearts; Silver Ginger 5; Ginger & the Sonic Circus; Supershit 666; Clam Abuse; Hey! Hello!; Mutation; Ginger Wildheart & the Sinners
- Formerly of: The Quireboys; The Throbs; Michael Monroe
- Website: gingerwildheart.net

Ginger Wildheart (born David Leslie Walls; 17 December 1964), sometimes known simply as Ginger, is an English rock guitarist, singer, and songwriter. He began his professional career as a guitarist in the Quireboys, but is best known as the founder and leader of the Wildhearts. In addition, he has released numerous solo albums and has been involved in many other musical projects.

== Career ==
=== Early career ===
Ginger played in many bands including South Shields band the Cups and Beki Bondage's band the Bombshells. He was a member of the English band the Quireboys from 1987 until 1989. After being sacked from the Quireboys, he was briefly in the New York band the Throbs, before going on to form the Wildhearts. He has led several incarnations of the Wildhearts since 1989.

=== Side projects ===
In addition to leading the Wildhearts and maintaining a solo career under his own name, Ginger has participated in numerous side projects and collaborations:

- Super$hit 666, with Dregen of Backyard Babies and Nicke Andersson of the Hellacopters, releasing the EP Super$hit 666 (1999).
- Clam Abuse, with Alex Kane, releasing Stop Thinking (1999).
- Silver Ginger 5, releasing Black Leather Mojo (2000). This album was originally intended as Ginger's first solo album, but was released under the name Silver Ginger 5. A short-lived band of that name was formed to perform the album live.
- Brides of Destruction: Ginger was briefly a member of this supergroup in 2005 but did not play on any recordings. He co-wrote some songs for the band's album Runaway Brides and played guitar for part of a tour, but then left the band due to an inability to make a full commitment.
- Ginger & the Sonic Circus, a short-lived collective formed in 2005 for live appearances; various members performed on the Ginger solo album Valor Del Corazon.
- Howling Willie Cunt, releasing World of Filth (2006). Ginger for many years refused to confirm that he was Howling Willie, instead insisting that this was another person who was signed to Ginger's record label, Round Records. Ginger later admitted that he was in fact Howling Willie.
- In 2010–2011, Ginger joined the backing band for former Hanoi Rocks lead singer Michael Monroe. He appeared on Monroe's live album Another Night in the Sun: Live in Helsinki and the studio album Sensory Overdrive, which reached #1 on Finnish albums chart and #13 on the UK rock albums chart.
- Hey! Hello!, a classic rock-oriented project with singer Victoria Liedtke. Ginger played all instruments for this project, including drums for the first time. This project gained robust media notice, with articles in The Metro and BBC Radio 1's Newsbeat. The album Hey! Hello! reached Number 37 in the UK album charts and Number 1 in the UK rock charts in 2013. This project was revived in 2015, with Liedtke being replaced by singer Hollis Mahady. The album Hey! Hello! Too! was released in 2016.
- Mutation, an industrial rock/noise project formed in 2012 with Mark E. Smith and members of Napalm Death, Exit International, the Sisters of Mercy, Hawkeyes, and Cardiacs. This group simultaneously released the albums The Frankenstein Effect and Error 500.
- Ginger Wildheart & the Sinners, a Rootsy, Rock n' Roll, Country flavoured band formed in 2019 with members of Stone Mountain Sinners. The eponymous debut album reached #8 in the UK Independent Album Charts.

=== Solo career ===
In early 2001, during The Wildhearts' first disbandment, Ginger proposed a series of CD singles with three tracks each, to be released each month for one year. Known as The Singles Club, this project included the first material released under the name Ginger and operated parallel to the Silver Ginger 5 project and a reformation of The Wildhearts. Due to financial problems at Infernal Records, only 18 tracks were recorded, and only five singles were released. A compilation of all 18 tracks was released in 2005 as the double album A Break in the Weather. Ginger also performed regular acoustic shows during this period, resulting in the live acoustic albums The Great White Monkey (2004) and Potatoes & You (2005).

Ginger released the solo albums Valor Del Corazon in 2006 and Yoni in 2007. The latter was described by critics as the most calm and eclectic record Ginger had made to date. The album featured guest appearances by Bernie Torme and Toadies singer Vaden Todd Lewis. In mid-2007, Ginger guested as the vocalist for The Scorchers in place of his hero Jason Ringenberg, billed as "Ginger and the Scorchers" on a few dates in the UK. Ginger's third solo album, Market Harbour, was released in 2008.

In March 2009 Ginger began writing a regular online column for Classic Rock magazine titled "Ginger's Secret History of Rock 'n' Roll", in which he discusses lesser-known albums. In May 2009 Ginger embarked on his first purely solo tour in which no Wildhearts songs were performed. The tour received rave reviews, including one from writer Steve Beebee in Kerrang! magazine. Ginger created an internet TV channel called "Great White Monkey TV" featuring tour footage and backstage video from every show on this tour. Ginger was the penultimate act at the Kerrang!-sponsored Camden Rocks festival at the Underworld in London on 6 June 2009. Ginger's performance was considered by Kerrang! Magazine to be the highlight of the day and received a review of 5 out of 5. Also in 2009, Ginger joined the supergroup Camp Freddy for a one-off show in Las Vegas with special guests including Corey Taylor, Duff McKagan, Matt Sorum, Billy Morrison, Chris Chaney, Dave Navarro, Steve Jones, John 5, and Ozzy Osbourne.

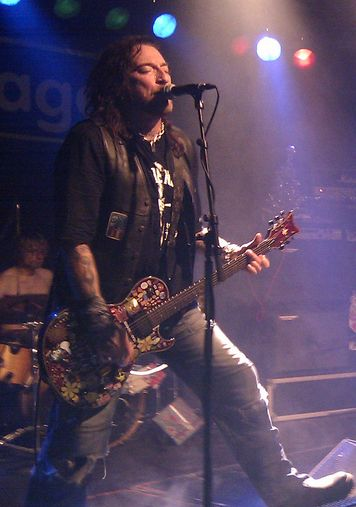
Ginger playing at the Glasgow Garage in December 2010

On 10 October 2010, Ginger released 10, a compilation of tracks from his solo career, as a 16-track CD on Round Records. The album is a retrospective of his solo work (including Silver Ginger 5) since 2000, along with two previously unreleased tracks. A second collection called 10 (Two) was also released as a free 10-track download.

For his next solo project in 2011, Ginger decided to avoid standard record company distribution and explore crowdfunding options. He launched the ambitious "Triple Album Project" via PledgeMusic, announcing a plan to record a 30-song triple album comprising hitherto unfinished and unrecorded material dating back to 2007. The campaign met with immediate success, hitting 100% of its funding total goal within six hours of launch. Hard copies of the full album, consisting of 3 CDs in a hardbound case, were offered only to contributors, and those contributors were invited to participate in a poll to select their favourite tracks. The top 12 songs selected in this fashion would be released as a standard single CD for the public via typical retail channels.

As the pledges continued to come in, Ginger announced in February 2012 that the title of the triple album would be 555% and that when the pledge total hit that percentage of the original funding goal, the 3-CD hard copy of the album would become unavailable, though contributors would still have access to all 30 tracks via download. Furthermore, the publicly-released single CD would be titled 100%. The 555% funding goal was reached three days later. Despite PledgeMusic's policy of not revealing funding amounts, Ginger announced that the campaign for the 555% / 100% album generated over a quarter of a million dollars. The 100% physical CD release reached number 9 in the midweek UK album chart and sold out its print run, ultimately charting at number 27 on the official UK albums chart.

The success of the crowdfunding project for the 555% / 100% album inspired Ginger to continue this model. Over the course of 2012 and 2013 he released one album with Hey! Hello!, two with Mutation, and the solo album Albion, all of which were also funded by contributions via Pledgemusic.

In 2014 Ginger briefly broke away from the crowdfunding model and set up a modern online version of an old-style fan club. A subscription to the Ginger Associated Secret Society (G-A-S-S) came with a guaranteed three brand new songs on the first day of every month. During this period Ginger also toured with the Courtney Love band, and she appeared in G-A-S-S song "Honour". In December 2014 Ginger announced another Pledgemusic campaign to jointly fund a new solo album and a biographical book. This Pledgemusic campaign quickly reached its funding goal, and 10% of all the money raised thereafter was donated to the charity Shelter. The album Year of the Fanclub, consisting of songs from the G-A-S-S project, was released in 2015, and the book on Ginger's life and music, titled Songs and Words, was released in early 2016.

Ginger's next crowdfunded project was the country-oriented album Ghost in the Tanglewood. The album was supported by an acoustic tour assisted by Jase Edwards. The album Headzapoppin, was released in late 2019. The album The Pessimist's Companion was released in 2020 by the recently relaunched Round Records. In 2019, Ginger formed Ginger Wildheart & the Sinners with singer/guitarist Neil Ivison, bassist Nick Lyndon, and drummer Shane Dixon. This ensemble recorded a self-titled album within seven days of their formation. That album was released in 2022 and reached No. 8 on the UK Independent Album chart.

== Personal life ==
Ginger has a child, Jazmin Bean, a singer-songwriter who first began releasing music in 2019. Their mother is Angie Adams, a former member of the punk rock band Fluffy. His son Jake is also a musician under the name Jaekonotnice.

Ginger announced in March 2026 that he had been diagnosed with mantle cell lymphoma, an aggressive form of cancer. He later stated in an Instagram post that he would not undergo treatment, and would spend the next two or three years saying his goodbyes. Ginger and CJ also resumed contact following Ginger's diagnosis.

== Discography ==
=== Studio albums ===
==== Studio albums and recording projects ====
- Valor Del Corazon (2005) - #196 JPN
- Yoni (2007) - #184 UK, #230 JPN
- Market Harbour (2008) - #189 UK, #183 JPN
- 100% / 555% (2012) - #27 UK, #164 JPN
- Albion (2013)
- Ghost in the Tanglewood (2017)
- The Pessimist's Companion (2018)
- Headzapoppin (2019)
- It Came from the North (2023)
- Teeth (2023)
- BeBop Narrative A.D. (2023)

==== Live albums ====
- Grievous Acoustic Behaviour (2001)
- The Great White Monkey (2004; special edition 2009)
- Potatoes & You (2005)
- Live Begins at 40 (2005)
- Kiss Alive II (2011)
- Birthday Bash 2018 (2018)
- Charity Acoustic May 2021 (2021)
- One Live (2021)
- April Foolishness (2022)

==== Compilation albums ====
- A Break in the Weather (2005)
- 10 (2010)
- Year of the Fanclub (2015) - #95 UK
- G*A*S*S* MK II (2018)
- Excess GASS (2020)
- Love in the Time of Cholera (2021)

=== Singles ===
- "I'm a Lover, Not a Fighter" (2001) - #134 UK
- "Cars and Vaginas" (2001) - #139 UK
- "And This Time I'm Serious" (2002)
- "The Saga of Me & You" (2002) - #151 UK
- "Virtual Love" (2003) – #135 UK
- "Yeah Yeah Yeah" (2006)
- "Holiday" / "Casino Bay" (2007)
- "Everything" (2014)
- "El Mundo (Slow Fatigue)" (2014)
- "Only Henry Rollins Can Save Us Now" (2014)
- "Honour" (2014)
- "The Pendine Incident" (2014)
- "Don't Stop Loving the Music" (2014)
- "Mr T & Me" (2014)
- "The Last Day of Summer" (2014)
- "Right in the Feels" (2015)
- "No One Smiled at Me Today" (2015)
- "Alvarado on the 2" (2015)
- "Don't Lose Your Tail Girl" (2015)
- "Clout" (EP, 2015)
- "I Wanna Be Yours" (2019)

=== Other projects ===
- Stop Thinking (1999) – Clam Abuse
- SuperShit 666 (EP) (1999) – SuperShit 666
- Black Leather Mojo (2000) – Silver Ginger 5
- World of Filth (2006) – Howling Willie Cunt
- The Frankenstein Effect/Error 500 (2013) – Mutation
- Hey! Hello! (2013) – Hey! Hello! - #274 JPN / #37 UK
- Hey! Hello! Too (2016) – Hey! Hello! (2016)
- Dark Black (2017) – Mutation
- Ginger Wildheart & the Sinners (2022)

== Additional appearances ==
- Devin Townsend – "Christeen" (Co-Writer)
- Neil Leyton – Dead Fashion Brigade (guitar, arrangements, production)
- Backyard Babies – "Brand New Hate" (Co-Writer) from the album Making Enemies Is Good
- Brides of Destruction – "White Trash", "Never Say Never", "Tunnel Of Love", "Dimes in Heaven" (Co-Writer)
- Michael Monroe – Sensory Overdrive (Co-Writer & Guitarist)
- Jason & the Scorchers – Halcyon Times (Co-Writer – credited as David Walls)
