= Biffy Clyro discography =

Discography of Scottish alternative rock band Biffy Clyro

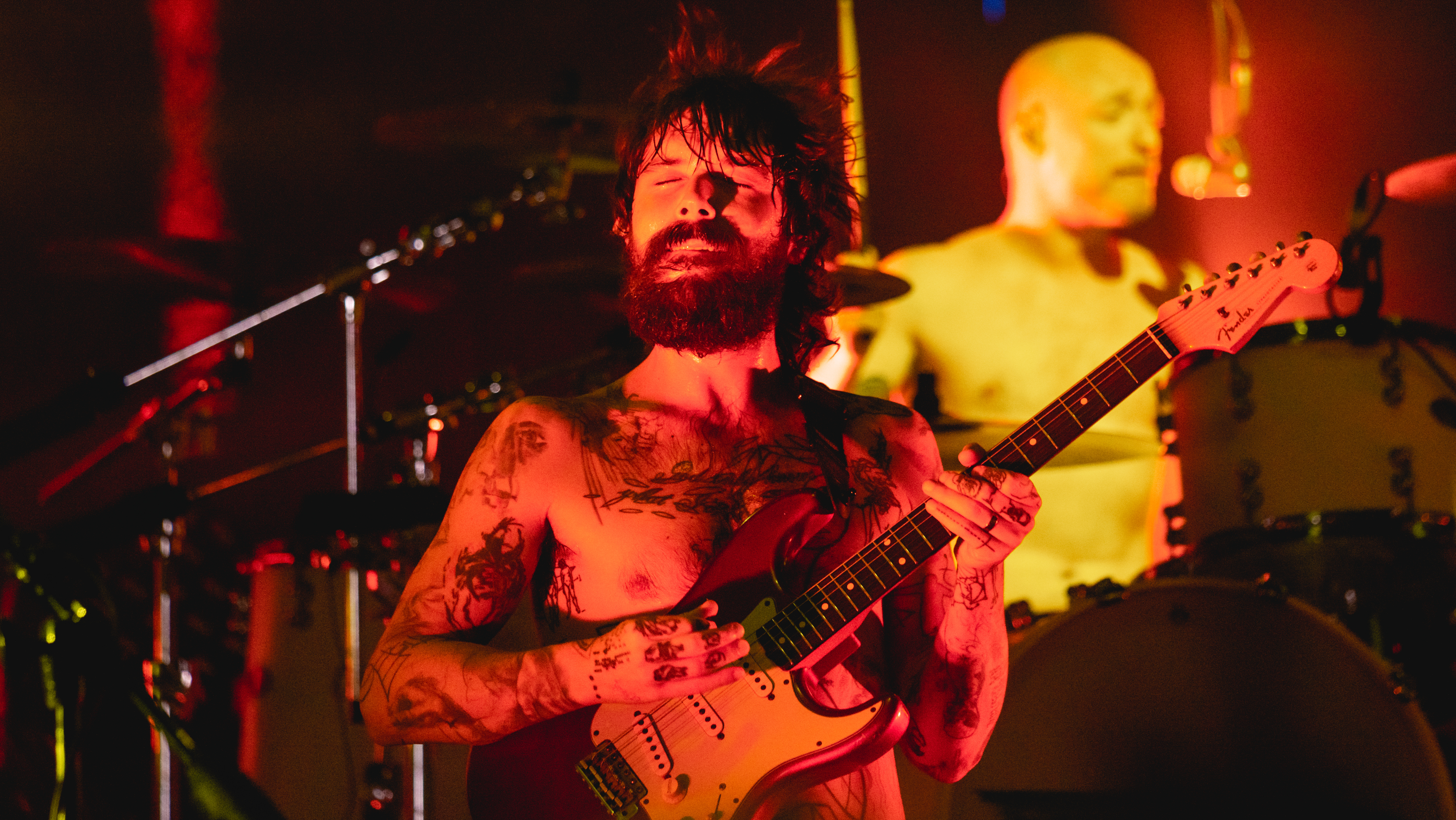
- Biffy Clyro performing in 2021
- Studio albums: 10
- Extended plays: 6
- Soundtrack albums: 1
- Live albums: 3
- Compilation albums: 7
- Singles: 43
- Music videos: 37
- Other appearances: 6

The discography of Biffy Clyro, a Scottish alternative rock band from Kilmarnock, consists of ten studio albums, three live albums, seven compilations, one soundtrack, six extended plays (EPs), 43 singles, 37 music videos and six other appearances. Formed in 1995 by vocalist and guitarist Simon Neil, bassist James Johnston and drummer Ben Johnston, Biffy Clyro released their debut EP thekidswhopoptodaywillrocktomorrow in 2000 through Electric Honey, and later signed with Beggars Banquet Records. The band's debut full-length album Blackened Sky was released in 2002, reaching number 25 on the Scottish Albums Chart. The Vertigo of Bliss followed in 2003, with single "Questions and Answers" reaching the top ten of the Scottish Singles Chart. The band's third and final album on Beggars Banquet, Infinity Land, peaked at number 13 in Scotland. "Glitter and Trauma", "My Recovery Injection" and "Only One Word Comes to Mind" all reached the singles chart top ten.

After signing with 14th Floor Records, Biffy Clyro returned in 2007 with Puzzle, which topped the Scottish Albums Chart and reached number 2 in the UK. The album was certified platinum in the UK, and spawned three UK top-20 singles: "Saturday Superhouse", "Living Is a Problem Because Everything Dies", and "Folding Stars". After reaching number 1 with "Mountains" and "That Golden Rule", the band released Only Revolutions in 2009 which reached number 2 in Scotland, number 3 in the UK, and has since been certified double platinum in the UK. An additional four singles from Only Revolutions reached the Scottish Singles Chart top 20. In 2011, the group issued their first live album Revolutions: Live at Wembley, which reached number 4 in Scotland and number 9 in the UK.

The double album Opposites, released in 2013, was the band's first to top the UK Albums Chart, as well as reaching number 1 in Scotland. Similarities, a collection of B-sides from the Opposites singles, charted at number 23 in Scotland and number 28 in the UK. Biffy's seventh studio album Ellipsis followed in 2016, following its predecessor in topping the charts in both the UK and Scotland. Upon the album's release, ten of the album's 11 tracks charted on the UK Rock & Metal Singles Chart, including four in the top ten. In 2018, the group released the live acoustic album MTV Unplugged: Live at Roundhouse, London, which reached number 2 on the Scottish Albums Chart and number 4 on the UK Albums Chart. The following year they released Balance, Not Symmetry, the soundtrack to the film of the same name written in part by Neil, which debuted at number 8 in Scotland and number 36 on the UK Albums Chart.

In 2020, the band released their eighth studio album A Celebration of Endings, released on the 14 August, postponed from its initial release date of 15 May due to the COVID-19 pandemic. The album reached number one on the UK Albums Chart. This was followed by 2021's The Myth of the Happily Ever After, which peaked at number four in the UK. In 2025, they released their tenth studio album Futique.

== Albums ==
=== Studio albums ===
List of studio albums with selected chart positions and certifications
| Title | Album details | Peak chart positions | | | | | | | | | | Sales | Certifications |
| Title | Album details | SCO | AUS | AUT | FIN | GER | IRL | NED | NOR | SWI | UK | Sales | Certifications |
|---|---|---|---|---|---|---|---|---|---|---|---|---|---|
| Blackened Sky | Released: 10 March 2002; Label: Beggars Banquet; Formats: CD, LP | 25 | — | — | — | — | — | — | — | — | 78 | | BPI: Gold |
| The Vertigo of Bliss | Released: 16 June 2003; Label: Beggars Banquet; Formats: CD, LP | 18 | — | — | — | — | — | — | — | — | 48 | | BPI: Silver |
| Infinity Land | Released: 4 October 2004; Label: Beggars Banquet; Formats: CD, LP, DL | 13 | — | — | — | — | — | — | — | — | 47 | | BPI: Silver |
| Puzzle | Released: 4 June 2007; Label: 14th Floor; Formats: CD, CD+DVD, DL | 1 | — | — | — | 95 | 17 | — | — | — | 2 | UK: 391,640 | BPI: Platinum |
| Only Revolutions | Released: 9 November 2009; Label: 14th Floor; Formats: CD, CD+DVD, DL | 4 | — | — | — | 65 | 16 | 85 | 28 | 66 | 3 | UK: 878,302 | BPI: 2× Platinum; IRMA: Platinum |
| Opposites | Released: 28 January 2013; Label: 14th Floor; Formats: CD, CD+DVD, LP, DL | 1 | 22 | 12 | 3 | 5 | 3 | 22 | 9 | 2 | 1 | UK: 321,510 | BPI: Platinum; BVMI: Gold |
| Ellipsis | Released: 8 July 2016; Label: 14th Floor, Warner; Formats: CD, LP, DL | 1 | 15 | 5 | 10 | 1 | 1 | 13 | 21 | 1 | 1 | | BPI: Gold |
| A Celebration of Endings | Released: 14 August 2020; Label: 14th Floor, Warner; Formats: CD, LP, DL | 1 | 21 | 5 | — | 4 | 2 | 23 | — | 4 | 1 | | BPI: Silver |
| The Myth of the Happily Ever After | Released: 22 October 2021; Label: 14th Floor, Warner; Formats: CD, LP, DL | 1 | — | 19 | 46 | 11 | 47 | 60 | — | 9 | 4 | | |
| Futique | Released: 19 September 2025; Label: 14th Floor, Warner; Formats: CD, LP, DL | 1 | 26 | 10 | — | 10 | 21 | 16 | — | 14 | 1 | UK: 32,043 | |
"—" denotes a release that did not chart or was not released in that territory.

=== Soundtracks ===
List of soundtrack albums with selected chart positions
| Title | Album details | Peak chart positions | | | | | | | |
| Title | Album details | SCO | GER | IRL | SWI | UK | UK Down | UK Rock | UK OST |
|---|---|---|---|---|---|---|---|---|---|
| Balance, Not Symmetry | Released: 17 May 2019; Label: 14th Floor; Formats: DL, LP | 6 | 68 | 62 | 52 | 36 | 6 | 1 | 4 |

=== Live albums ===
List of live albums with selected chart positions and certifications
| Title | Album details | Peak chart positions | | | | | | | | | | Certifications |
| Title | Album details | SCO | AUT | BEL Fla. | GER | IRL | NED | SWI | UK | UK Down | UK Rock | Certifications |
|---|---|---|---|---|---|---|---|---|---|---|---|---|
| Revolutions: Live at Wembley | Released: 27 June 2011; Label: 14th Floor; Formats: CD+DVD, DL | 4 | — | — | 76 | — | — | — | 9 | 48 | 1 | BPI: Gold |
| Opposites: Live from Glasgow | Released: 29 November 2013; Label: 14th Floor; Formats: CD, DL | — | — | — | — | — | — | — | — | — | — | |
| MTV Unplugged: Live at Roundhouse, London | Released: 25 May 2018; Label: 14th Floor; Formats: CD+DVD, LP, DL | 2 | 14 | 152 | 5 | 7 | 167 | 11 | 4 | 11 | — | |
| A Celebration of Endings: Live from the Barrowlands Ballroom | Released: 14 October 2022; Label: 14th Floor; Formats: 2×LP, Blu-ray | — | — | — | — | — | — | — | — | — | — | |
"—" denotes a release that did not chart or was not released in that territory.

=== Compilations ===
List of compilation albums with selected chart positions
| Title | Album details | Peak chart positions | | | | | |
| Title | Album details | SCO | GER | IRL | UK | UK Down | UK Rock |
|---|---|---|---|---|---|---|---|
| Singles 2001–2005 | Released: 7 July 2008; Label: Beggars Banquet; Format: CD | — | — | — | — | — | — |
| Missing Pieces | Released: 14 May 2009; Label: 14th Floor; Format: DL | — | — | — | — | — | — |
| Lonely Revolutions | Released: 23 August 2010; Label: 14th Floor; Formats: CD, LP, DL | 60 | — | — | — | — | — |
| Blackened Sky B-Sides | Released: 2 April 2012; Label: 14th Floor; Format: DL | — | — | — | — | — | — |
| The Vertigo of Bliss B-Sides | Released: 11 June 2012; Label: 14th Floor; Format: DL | — | — | — | — | — | — |
| Infinity Land B-Sides | Released: 24 September 2012; Label: 14th Floor; Format: DL | — | — | — | — | — | — |
| Similarities | Released: 18 July 2014; Label: 14th Floor; Formats: CD, LP, DL | 23 | 50 | 37 | 28 | 28 | 1 |
"—" denotes a release that did not chart or was not released in that territory.

== Extended plays ==
List of extended plays
| Title | EP details |
|---|---|
| thekidswhopoptodaywillrocktomorrow | Released: 13 June 2000; Label: Electric Honey; Format: CD |
| Live at Radio 1's Big Weekend | Released: 4 June 2007; Label: BBC; Format: DL |
| iTunes Live from London | Released: 26 October 2009; Label: 14th Floor; Format: DL |
| iTunes Festival: London 2010 | Released: 18 January 2010; Label: 14th Floor; Format: DL |
| iTunes Festival: London 2012 | Released: 28 September 2012; Label: 14th Floor; Format: DL |
| Spotify Sessions | Released: 1 July 2016; Label: 14th Floor; Format: DL |

== Singles ==
List of singles with selected chart positions and certifications, showing year released and album name
| Title | Year | Peak chart positions | | | | | | | | | | Certifications | Album |
| Title | Year | SCO | BEL Fla. | CAN Rock | CZE | IRL | NED | UK | UK Rock | US Alt. | US Main. | Certifications | Album |
|---|---|---|---|---|---|---|---|---|---|---|---|---|---|
| "Iname" | 1999 | — | — | — | — | — | — | — | — | — | — | | Non-album single |
| "27" | 2001 | — | — | — | — | — | — | — | — | — | — | | Blackened Sky |
| "Justboy" | 2001 | 56 | — | — | — | — | — | 111 | — | — | — | | Blackened Sky |
| "57" | 2002 | 30 | — | — | — | — | — | 61 | — | — | — | | Blackened Sky |
| "Joy.Discovery.Invention/Toys, Toys, Toys, Choke, Toys, Toys, Toys" | 2002 | 46 | — | — | — | — | — | 86 | — | — | — | | Blackened Sky/The Vertigo of Bliss |
| "The Ideal Height" | 2003 | 31 | — | — | — | — | — | 46 | — | — | — | | The Vertigo of Bliss |
| "Questions and Answers" | 2003 | 9 | — | — | — | — | — | 26 | 3 | — | — | | The Vertigo of Bliss |
| "Eradicate the Doubt" | 2003 | 88 | — | — | — | — | — | 98 | — | — | — | | The Vertigo of Bliss |
| "There's No Such Thing as a Jaggy Snake" | 2004 | — | — | — | — | — | — | — | — | — | — | | Infinity Land |
| "Glitter and Trauma" | 2004 | 7 | — | — | — | — | — | 21 | — | — | — | | Infinity Land |
| "My Recovery Injection" | 2004 | 10 | — | — | — | — | — | 24 | 3 | — | — | | Infinity Land |
| "Only One Word Comes to Mind" | 2005 | 7 | — | — | — | — | — | 27 | — | — | — | | Infinity Land |
| "Semi-Mental" | 2006 | — | — | — | — | — | — | — | — | — | — | | Puzzle |
| "Saturday Superhouse" | 2007 | 1 | — | — | — | — | — | 13 | — | — | — | | Puzzle |
| "Living Is a Problem Because Everything Dies" | 2007 | 1 | — | — | — | — | — | 19 | — | 47 | — | | Puzzle |
| "Folding Stars" | 2007 | 2 | — | — | — | — | — | 18 | — | — | — | | Puzzle |
| "Machines" | 2007 | 5 | — | — | — | — | — | 29 | — | — | — | BPI: Silver | Puzzle |
| "Who's Got a Match?" | 2008 | 5 | — | — | — | — | — | 27 | — | — | — | | Puzzle |
| "Mountains" | 2008 | 1 | — | — | — | 42 | — | 5 | — | — | — | BPI: Platinum | Only Revolutions |
| "That Golden Rule" | 2009 | 1 | — | — | — | — | — | 10 | — | — | — | BPI: Silver | Only Revolutions |
| "The Captain" | 2009 | 7 | — | — | — | — | — | 17 | 1 | — | — | BPI: Silver | Only Revolutions |
| "Many of Horror" | 2010 | 9 | — | — | — | 10 | 66 | 8 | — | 33 | — | BPI: Platinum | Only Revolutions |
| "Bubbles" | 2010 | 20 | — | — | — | — | — | 34 | — | — | — | BPI: Platinum | Only Revolutions |
| "God and Satan" | 2010 | 17 | — | — | — | — | — | 36 | — | — | — | BPI: Silver | Only Revolutions |
| "Black Chandelier" | 2013 | 8 | 11 | 38 | — | 75 | — | 14 | 1 | 25 | — | BPI: Silver | Opposites |
| "Biblical" | 2013 | 38 | — | — | — | — | — | 70 | 3 | — | — | BPI: Silver | Opposites |
| "Opposite" | 2013 | 38 | — | — | — | — | — | 49 | 1 | — | — | | Opposites |
| "Victory Over the Sun" | 2013 | 93 | — | — | — | — | — | 152 | — | — | — | | Opposites |
| "Wolves of Winter" | 2016 | 32 | — | — | — | — | — | 110 | 1 | — | 28 | BPI: Silver | Ellipsis |
| "Animal Style" | 2016 | 90 | — | — | — | — | — | 184 | 3 | — | — | | Ellipsis |
| "Howl" | 2016 | — | — | — | — | — | — | — | 13 | 33 | 16 | | Ellipsis |
| "Re-Arrange" | 2016 | 39 | — | — | 28 | — | — | — | 1 | — | — | BPI: Silver | Ellipsis |
| "Flammable" | 2017 | — | — | — | 64 | — | — | — | 16 | — | — | | Ellipsis |
| "Friends and Enemies" | 2017 | — | — | — | — | — | — | — | 7 | — | — | | Ellipsis |
| "Modern Love" | 2019 | — | — | — | — | — | — | — | — | — | — | | The Howard Stern Tribute to David Bowie |
| "Balance, Not Symmetry" | 2019 | 65 | — | — | — | — | — | — | 19 | — | — | | Balance, Not Symmetry |
| "The Modern Leper" | 2019 | 10 | — | — | — | — | — | — (Note: "The Modern Leper" did not enter the UK Singles Chart, but peaked at number five on the UK Physical Singles Chart Top 100.) | — | — | — | | Tiny Changes: A Celebration of Frightened Rabbit's 'The Midnight Organ Fight' |
| "Instant History" | 2020 | 17 | — | — | 16 | — | — | — (Note: "Instant History" did not enter the UK Singles Chart but peaked at number 29 on the UK Sales Chart.) | — | 35 | 22 | | A Celebration of Endings |
| "End Of" | 2020 | 60 | — | — | — | — | — | — | — | — | — | | A Celebration of Endings |
| "Tiny Indoor Fireworks" | 2020 | 55 | — | — | — | — | — | — (Note: "Tiny Indoor Fireworks" did not enter the UK Singles Chart but peaked at number 86 on the UK Sales Chart.) | — | — | — | | A Celebration of Endings |
| "Space" | 2020 | 25 | — | — | — | — | — | 81 | — | — | — | BPI: Silver | A Celebration of Endings |
| "Cop Syrup" | 2020 | — | — | — | — | — | — | — (Note: "Cop Syrup" did not enter the UK Singles Chart but peaked at number 4 on the UK Sales Chart.) | — | — | — | | A Celebration of Endings |
| "Unknown Male 01" | 2021 | — | — | — | — | — | — | — | — | — | — | | The Myth of the Happily Ever After |
| "A Hunger in Your Haunt" | 2021 | — | — | — | — | — | — | — | — | — | — | | The Myth of the Happily Ever After |
| "Errors in the History of God" | 2021 | — | — | — | — | — | — | — (Note: "Errors in the History of God" did not enter the UK Singles Chart but peaked at number 1 on the UK Vinyl Singles Chart.) | 13 | — | — | | The Myth of the Happily Ever After |
| "A Little Love" | 2025 | — | — | — | 48 | — | — | — | — | — | — | | Futique |
| "Hunting Season" | 2025 | — | — | — | — | — | — | — | — | — | — | | Futique |
| "True Believer" | 2025 | — | — | — | — | — | — | — | — | — | — | | Futique |
"—" denotes a release that did not chart or was not released in that territory.

== Other charted songs ==
List of songs with selected chart positions, showing year released and album name
| Title | Year | Charts | Album |
| Title | Year | UK Rock | Album |
|---|---|---|---|
| "Sky Demon" | 2009 | 13 | Only Revolutions |
| "Different People" | 2013 | 19 | Opposites |
| "Herex" | 2016 | 14 | Ellipsis |
| "On a Bang" | 2016 | 20 | Ellipsis |
| "Small Wishes" | 2016 | 27 | Ellipsis |
| "People" | 2016 | 33 | Ellipsis |

== Music videos ==
List of music videos, showing year released and director(s)
| Title | Year | Director(s) | Ref. |
|---|---|---|---|
| "57" | 2002 | Matt Broadley | |
| "Justboy" | 2002 | Will Htay | |
| "Toys, Toys, Toys, Choke, Toys, Toys, Toys" | 2002 | Paul McCallum | |
| "Questions and Answers" | 2003 | Bradley Beesley, Dan Brown | |
| "Eradicate the Doubt" | 2003 | Martin Wallace | |
| "Glitter and Trauma" | 2004 | The Shammashian Brothers | |
| "My Recovery Injection" | 2004 | Bradley Beesley, Dan Brown | |
| "Only One Word Comes to Mind" | 2005 | Paul Williams | |
| "Semi-Mental" | 2006 | Alex Gilbert, Biffy Clyro | |
| "Saturday Superhouse" | 2007 | Bradley Beesley | |
| "Living Is a Problem Because Everything Dies" | 2007 | Andy Morahan | |
| "Folding Stars" | 2007 | Howard Greenhalgh | |
| "Machines" | 2007 | unknown | |
| "Who's Got a Match?" | 2008 | Tim Mattia | |
| "Mountains" | 2008 | James Copeman | |
| "That Golden Rule" | 2009 | Popcore | |
| "The Captain" | 2009 | Andy Morahan | |
| "Many of Horror" | 2010 | Andy Morahan | |
| "Bubbles" | 2010 | Marc Klasfeld | |
| "God and Satan" | 2010 | Corin Hardy | |
| "Booooom, Blast & Ruin" | 2010 | Blair Young | |
| "Stingin' Belle" | 2012 | Sam Wrench | |
| "Black Chandelier" | 2012 | Big TV! | |
| "Biblical" | 2013 | Jim Canty | |
| "Opposite" | 2013 | Elliott Sellers | |
| "Victory Over the Sun" | 2013 | Jim Canty | |
| "Sounds Like Balloons" | 2013 | unknown | |
| "Wolves of Winter" | 2016 | Chris Boyle | |
| "Animal Style" | 2016 | Tim Mattia | |
| "Howl" | 2016 | Marc Klasfeld | |
| "Re-Arrange" | 2016 | Oscar Sansom | |
| "Flammable" | 2017 | Ross Cairns | |
| "Friends and Enemies" | 2017 | Oscar Sansom, Michael Sherrington | |
| "Balance, Not Symmetry" | 2019 | Jamie Adams | |
| "Instant History" | 2020 | Sophia + Robert | |
| "Tiny Indoor Fireworks" | 2020 | Oscar Sansom | |
| "Space" | 2020 | Joe Connor | |
| "A Hunger In Your Haunt / Unknown Male 01" | 2021 | Oscar Sansom | |
| "A Little Love" | 2025 | Piers Dennis | |
| "Hunting Season" | 2025 | Oscar Sansom | |
| "Goodbye" | 2025 | unknown | |

== Other appearances ==
List of other appearances, showing year released and album name
| Title | Year | Album | Ref. |
|---|---|---|---|
| "Buddy Holly" (Weezer cover) | 2006 | High Voltage!: A Brief History of Rock | |
| "Umbrella" (Rihanna cover) | 2007 | Radio 1's Live Lounge Volume 2 | |
| "Fight for This Love" (Cheryl Cole cover) | 2007 | Dermot O'Leary Presents The Saturday Sessions | |
| "Love Sex Magic" (Ciara cover) | 2009 | Radio 1's Live Lounge Volume 4 | |
| "We Built This City" (Starship cover) | 2013 | BBC Radio 1's Live Lounge 2013 | |
| "Get Lucky" (Daft Punk cover) | 2014 | The Saturday Sessions from The Dermot O'Leary Show | |
| "The Modern Leper" (Frightened Rabbit cover) | 2019 | Tiny Changes: A Celebration of Frightened Rabbit's 'The Midnight Organ Fight' | |
| "Times Like These" (as part of Live Lounge Allstars) | 2020 | Non-album single | |
