= A Celebration of Endings: Live from the Barrowlands Ballroom =

A Celebration of Endings (Live from the Barrowland Ballroom Glasgow)

Live album by Biffy Clyro
- Released: 14 October 2022
- Recorded: 2020
- Venue: The Barrowland Ballroom, Glasgow, Scotland
- Genre: Alternative rock
- Length: 49:17
- Label: 14th Floor

Biffy Clyro chronology
MTV Unplugged: Live at Roundhouse, London (2018)	A Celebration of Endings (Live from the Barrowland Ballroom Glasgow) (2022)

A Celebration of Endings (Live from the Barrowland Ballroom Glasgow) is the fourth live album by Scottish alternative rock band Biffy Clyro. Originally recorded in 2020 as a digital live show during the COVID-19 pandemic, the album was released on 14 October 2022 as a two disc vinyl LP which included a Blu-ray disc of the footage from the original digital live show. The physical release was limited to 3,000 copies.

== Background ==
Biffy Clyro streamed a digital live show from The Barrowland Ballroom in Glasgow, Scotland on 14 August 2020 where they performed their then newly released album A Celebration of Endings in full. The band performed in various parts of the venue, most notably in a cube situated off stage for Tiny Indoor Fireworks, and guitarist and vocalist Simon Neil performing part of Cop Syrup walking down the venue's stairs, heading outside briefly before returning to the stage

This was the first time the band had performed live since the beginning of the COVID-19 related lockdowns in the United Kingdom, which had already caused a three-month delay to the studio album's release

On 19 August 2022, the band announced the release of the live performance as a two-disc vinyl LP and a Blu-ray disc as one bundle, which was eventually released on 14 October 2022 and limited to 3,000 copies worldwide.

== Track listing ==
All tracks are written by Simon Neil, additional writers listed where appropriate.

No.	Title	Writer(s)	Length
1.	"North of No South"		4:53
2.	"The Champ"		3:35
3.	"Weird Leisure"		4:46
4.	"Tiny Indoor Fireworks"		4:11
5.	"Worst Type of Best Possible"		3:51
6.	"Space"	Steve Mac	4:25
7.	"End Of"		4:30
8.	"Instant History"	Steve Mac, Ammar Malik	4:04
9.	"The Pink Limit"		4:14
10.	"Opaque"		4:14
11.	"Cop Syrup"		6:34
Total length:			49:17
