= Futique =

Studio album by Biffy Clyro
- Released: 19 September 2025
- Recorded: 2024–2025
- Studio: Hansa (Berlin, Germany)
- Length: 44:32
- Label: Warner
- Producer: Biffy Clyro; Jonathan Gilmore

Biffy Clyro chronology
The Myth of the Happily Ever After (2021)	Futique (2025)

Singles from Futique
- 1. "A Little Love" Released: 11 June 2025; 2. "Hunting Season" Released: 30 July 2025; 3. "True Believer" Released: 5 September 2025; 4. "Goodbye" Released: 19 September 2025

Futique is the tenth (Note: This numbering does not include the soundtrack album Balance, Not Symmetry from 2019. See also: Biffy Clyro discography) studio album by Scottish alternative rock band Biffy Clyro. It was produced by Jonathan Gilmore and was released on 19 September 2025. The title is a portmanteau of "future" and "antique", which vocalist and guitarist Simon Neil described as "an exploration of ideas, objects or relationships that exist across time".

The album debuted at number one on the Scottish Albums Chart and the UK Albums Chart, whilst it reached the top 10 in Austria and Germany.

== Background ==
The band announced the album in June 2025 with a release date of 26 September, which was later moved a week ahead. The lead single "A Little Love" premiered on BBC Radio 1 on 11 June, and was followed-up by the singles "Hunting Season" and "True Believer", as well as "Goodbye", which was released on the same day of the album along with an accompanying music video.

== Track listing ==
All tracks are written by Simon Neil.

Futique track listing
No.	Title	Length
1.	"A Little Love"	3:38
2.	"Hunting Season"	2:55
3.	"Shot One"	3:30
4.	"True Believer"	4:34
5.	"Goodbye"	3:47
6.	"Friendshipping"	3:14
7.	"Woe Is Me, Wow Is You"	4:46
8.	"It's Chemical!"	4:12
9.	"A Thousand and One"	3:34
10.	"Dearest Amygdala"	4:29
11.	"Two People in Love"	5:50
Total length:		44:32

== Personnel ==
Credits adapted from Tidal.

=== Biffy Clyro ===
- Ben Johnston – drums, backing vocals, production
- James Johnston – bass, backing vocals, production
- Simon Neil – vocals, guitar, keyboards, piano, programming, production, art direction, artwork, design

=== Additional contributors ===
- Jonathan Gilmore – production, mixing, percussion, programming, synthesizer
- Robin Schmidt – mastering
- Freddy Williams – engineering, additional programming
- Axel Reinemer – engineering assistance
- Brodie Griffin – engineering assistance
- Dylan Grafftey-Smith – engineering assistance
- Luke Gibbs – engineering assistance
- Marian Hafenstein – engineering assistance
- David Dlubatz – studio assistance
- Kian Moghaddamzadeh – studio assistance
- Sören Kleideiter – studio assistance
- Welf Willemeit – studio assistance
- Francesca Neil – band technician, artwork
- Lee Birchall – band technician
- Neil Anderson – band technician
- Richard Pratt – band technician
- Simon Javes – band technician
- Richard Ingram – piano (tracks 1, 5, 7, 11)
- Sam Swallow – strings arrangement, strings conductor (1, 5, 7)
- Marianne Haynes – first violin (1, 5, 7)
- Bridget O'Donnell – second violin (1, 5, 7)
- Jonny Byers – cello (1, 5, 7)
- Meghan Cassidy – viola (1, 5, 7)
- Gavin Dean – strings engineering (1, 5, 7)
- Mike Vennart – guitar (5)
- Eva Pentel – band photo

== Charts ==
Chart performance for Futique
Chart (2025)	Peak position
Australian Albums (ARIA)	26
Austrian Albums (Ö3 Austria)	10
Croatian International Albums (HDU)	3
Dutch Albums (Album Top 100)	16
French Rock & Metal Albums (SNEP)	13
German Albums (Offizielle Top 100)	10
German Rock & Metal Albums (Offizielle Top 100)	4
Hungarian Physical Albums (MAHASZ)	12
Irish Albums (OCC)	21
Scottish Albums (OCC)	1
Swiss Albums (Schweizer Hitparade)	14
UK Albums (OCC)	1
UK Rock & Metal Albums (OCC)	1
