= The Myth of the Happily Ever After =

Studio album by Biffy Clyro
- Released: 22 October 2021
- Recorded: 2020–2021
- Studio: Biffy Clyro's home studio (West Scotland)
- Genres: Alternative rock; progressive rock; experimental rock
- Length: 50:02
- Labels: 14th Floor; Warner
- Producers: Biffy Clyro; Adam Noble

Biffy Clyro chronology
A Celebration of Endings (2020)	The Myth of the Happily Ever After (2021)	Futique (2025)

Singles from The Myth of the Happily Ever After
- 1. "Unknown Male 01" Released: 3 September 2021; 2. "A Hunger in Your Haunt" Released: 20 September 2021; 3. "Errors in the History of God" Released: 21 October 2021

Professional ratings
Aggregate scores
Source	Rating
Metacritic	91/100
Review scores
Source	Rating
AllMusic	4/5 stars
Clash	8/10 stars
Classic Rock	4.5/5 stars
DIY	4.5/5 stars
Kerrang!	5/5 stars
NME	4/5 stars
musicOMH	4.5/5 stars
Sputnikmusic	4.5/5 stars

The Myth of the Happily Ever After is the ninth (Note: This numbering does not include the soundtrack album Balance, Not Symmetry from 2019. See also: Biffy Clyro discography) studio album by Scottish rock band Biffy Clyro, released on 22 October 2021 on 14th Floor and Warner Records. Produced by the band itself and Adam Noble, the album was recorded at the band's home studio on a dairy farm in Ayrshire, Scotland during the COVID-19 pandemic.

Considered to be a 'sister album' to their 2020 album, A Celebration of Endings, the album's release was accompanied by a documentary film, called Biffy Clyro: Cultural Sons of Scotland, which documented its writing and recording process across 2020 and 2021. Released to critical acclaim, the album debuted at number four on the UK Albums Chart and number one on the Scottish Albums Chart.

== Background ==
The band first revealed they were working on a follow-up to A Celebration of Endings in August 2020, with Simon Neil saying the band had "15 songs that didn't make the album" that would make "a sprawling sister record". While in recording, the record had the working titles, A Commemoration of Commiserations, and the initials, RMV.

The band announced they had finished their "positive but nihilistic" album at the BRIT awards in May 2021, and revealed a potential October release date. Neil said the album was originally "completely hand-in-hand [with A Celebration of Endings]" but "because we didn’t tour I ended up writing about seven or eight new songs for the album. Originally it was intended to be a few off-cuts from ‘A Celebration Of Endings’, but now it’s got wonderful new art and it’s kind of its own beast."

== Recording ==
Unable to tour in support of the band's eight studio album, A Celebration of Endings (2020), due to the COVID-19 pandemic, the band began recording The Myth of the Happily Ever After at their home studio in Ayrshire, Scotland, which is located on a dairy farm. Regarding working at their home studio, Simon Neil stated: "This album is defined by the fact we made it on a farm - and sonically you can hear it." During the recording process, the band recorded percussion using the farm's walls and sampled "cows making noises".

The album was recorded and co-produced by Adam Noble, who had previously worked with the band on its 2019 soundtrack album, Balance, Not Symmetry.

== Release ==
The album was announced on 3 September 2021 alongside the first single "Unknown Male 01", after headlining Reading and Leeds Festival. "Unknown Male 01" was described as conveying "the hopelessness and darkness felt when we lose someone we love". Neil added "when you lose people […] it can make you question every single thing about your own life".

Released on 20 September, second single "A Hunger in Your Haunt" was written as a "self-motivating mantra", born of "pure frustration".

The 3rd single "Errors in the History of God" premiered on BBC Radio 1 on 21 October, prior to The Myth of the Happily Ever After's release on 22 October 2021.

A combined music video of the two previously released singles was premiered on YouTube on 28 September 2021.

The band performed the second single off the record "A Hunger in Your Haunt" live on Later... 23 October 2021

The album was acclaimed by critics and fans alike.

== Musical style ==
The band have said the album is a "reaction" to A Celebration of Endings and lyrically themed as "a fairly positive outlook with […] bone marrow nihilism going down inside of it", and "a rapid emotional response to the turmoil of the past year"

The lead single "Unknown Male 01" has been described as a "slow building track that explores the themes of loss". It starts with "simple yet emotional instrumentation" with "church-like organ" then proceeding to turn into a "riff-laden rock explosion", making use of "hard rock and math rock tendencies". Second single "A Hunger in Your Haunt" was described as a "punching, hard-riffing track", that "jumps between gorgeous melodies and angular yelps, expressing both sides of the band's incredibly diverse sound".

NME described the whole album as a "record defined by nuance", from "wonky electro and simmering rock of 'Separate Missions'" to the "R&B vibes" and "rock crescendo of 'Haru Urara'". DIY describes the album as having "abundant creative freedom, and Kerrang! describes "song structures [that] are subverted and arrangements are constructed with forensic care, while the level of creativity is unsurpassed".

== Track listing ==
All tracks are written by Simon Neil.

The Myth of the Happily Ever After track listing
No.	Title	Length
1.	"DumDum"	3:32
2.	"A Hunger in Your Haunt"	3:49
3.	"Denier"	2:59
4.	"Separate Missions"	5:18
5.	"Witch's Cup"	4:44
6.	"Holy Water"	5:40
7.	"Errors in the History of God"	4:16
8.	"Haru Urara"	3:15
9.	"Unknown Male 01"	6:08
10.	"Existed"	4:09
11.	"Slurpy Slurpy Sleep Sleep"	6:09
Total length:		50:02

== Personnel ==
=== Biffy Clyro ===
- Simon Neil – lead vocals, guitars, keyboards (all tracks); violin (1, 11)
- James Johnston – bass guitar (all tracks), backing vocals (2, 4, 5, 7, 8)
- Ben Johnston – drums, percussion (all tracks); programming (2–10), backing vocals (6–9, 11)

=== Production ===
- Adam Noble – production, mixing, engineer, programming

== Charts ==
Chart performance for The Myth of the Happily Ever After
Chart (2021)	Peak position
Austrian Albums (Ö3 Austria)	19
Belgian Albums (Ultratop Flanders)	183
Belgian Albums (Ultratop Wallonia)	122
Dutch Albums (Album Top 100)	60
Finnish Albums (Suomen virallinen lista)	46
German Albums (Offizielle Top 100)	11
Hungarian Albums (MAHASZ)	23
Irish Albums (Official Charts)	47
Scottish Albums (Official Charts)	1
Swiss Albums (Schweizer Hitparade)	9
UK Albums (Official Charts)	4
UK Rock & Metal Albums (Official Charts)	1
