= A Celebration of Endings =

2020 studio album by Biffy Clyro

Studio album by Biffy Clyro
- Released: 14 August 2020
- Recorded: 2019
- Studio: Lotus Easter (Santa Monica, California); United Recording (Los Angeles, California); Abbey Road (London, England); RAK (London, England); Rockstone (London, England)
- Genre: Alternative rock; progressive rock
- Length: 45:19
- Label: 14th Floor; Warner Bros.
- Producer: Biffy Clyro; Rich Costey; Steve Mac

Biffy Clyro chronology
Balance, Not Symmetry (2019)	A Celebration of Endings (2020)	The Myth of the Happily Ever After (2021)

Singles from A Celebration of Endings
- 1. "Instant History" Released: 20 February 2020; 2. "End Of" Released: 5 March 2020; 3. "Tiny Indoor Fireworks" Released: 14 May 2020; 4. "Weird Leisure" Released: 30 July 2020; 5. "Space" Released: 13 August 2020; 6. "Cop Syrup" Released: 10 January 2021

A Celebration of Endings is the eighth (Note: The band referred to the album using the working title Opus 8. This numbering does not include the soundtrack album Balance, Not Symmetry from 2019. See also: Biffy Clyro discography) studio album by Scottish alternative rock band Biffy Clyro. It was produced by Rich Costey and was released on 14 August 2020. It debuted at number one on the UK Albums Chart, making it the band's third consecutive studio album to top the chart.

== Background ==
The band confirmed they were working on new material in an NME interview in July 2019, having released their soundtrack album Balance, Not Symmetry a few months earlier. Another NME interview in October 2019 confirmed the release of the album, with the working title Opus 8, for the 'first half of next year'.

The first single, "Instant History", was released on 20 February 2020, and first played on Annie Mac's BBC Radio 1 show.

The album was initially planned for release of 15 May 2020, but was pushed back to 14 August due to difficulties surrounding the COVID-19 pandemic.

== Critical reception ==
Professional ratings
Aggregate scores
Source	Rating
AnyDecentMusic?	7.9/10
Metacritic	84/100
Review scores
Source	Rating
American Songwriter	4/5 stars
Classic Rock	3.5/5 stars
DIY	4.5/5 stars
The Independent	4/5 stars
Kerrang!	5/5
Mojo	4/5 stars
NME	4/5 stars
The Observer	3/5 stars
Q	4/5 stars
Uncut	8/10

The album received critical acclaim upon release. On review aggregate website Metacritic, the album has an average score of 84 out of 100, indicating "universal acclaim," based on 16 reviews. Kerrang! gave the album a perfect score, stating that "Biffy Clyro have delivered an album of restless invention, substance and style that arrives like a spray of water on the arid expanse of this saddest of summers." The Independent also gave the album a positive review, writing that the album "soothes, shakes and surprises at every turn".

== Track listing ==
All tracks are written by Simon Neil; additional writers listed.

No.	Title	Writer(s)	Length
1.	"North of No South"		4:05
2.	"The Champ"		3:37
3.	"Weird Leisure"		4:08
4.	"Tiny Indoor Fireworks"		3:16
5.	"Worst Type of Best Possible"		3:50
6.	"Space"	Steve Mac	3:56
7.	"End Of"		4:37
8.	"Instant History"	Steve Mac, Ammar Malik	3:31
9.	"The Pink Limit"		3:55
10.	"Opaque"		4:07
11.	"Cop Syrup" (Collector's Edition contains hidden track "Less is More")		6:17
Total length:			45:19

== Personnel ==
Biffy Clyro

- Simon Neil – lead vocals, guitars
- James Johnston – bass guitar, backing vocals
- Ben Johnston – drums, backing vocals, percussion

Additional personnel

- Zac Rae – additional keyboards
- Steve Mac – additional Keyboards
- Rob Mathes – string arrangements and conducting
- Jenny Nendick – conducting
- Jackie Shave – concertmaster (1st violin)
- Magnus Johnston – violin
- Perry Montague-Mason – violin
- Patrick Kiernan – violin
- Pete Hanson – violin
- Natalia Bonner – violin
- Cathy Thompson – violin
- Debbie Widdup – violin
- Jonathan Evans-Jones – violin
- Chris Tombling – violin
- Bruce White – viola
- Peter Lale – viola
- Rachel Roberts – viola
- Caroline Dearley – cello
- Ian Burdge – cello
- Jonathan Williams – cello
- Caroline Dearley – cello

Production

- Rich Costey – production, mixing
- Steve Mac – production
- James Rushent – additional production
- Chris Laws – additional programming and engineering
- Joe La Porta – mastering
- Jonathan Allen – string recording
- Paul Pritchard – string recording assistant
- Neil Dawes – string recording assistant
- KT Pipal – engineering
- Mario Borgatta – engineering
- Wesley M. Seidman – engineering
- Cecil Barlett – engineering
- Dann Pursey – engineering
- Koby Merman – additional mix engineering and digital editing
- Dalton Ricks – additional mix engineering
- Ross Newbauer – additional mix engineering

Artwork and design

- Thomas Robson – cover artwork
- Simon Neil – additional artwork, art direction
- Richard Welland – art direction
- Ash Reynolds – photography

== Charts ==
Chart performance for A Celebration of Endings
Chart (2020)	Peak position
Australian Albums (ARIA)	21
Austrian Albums (Ö3 Austria)	5
Belgian Albums (Ultratop Flanders)	77
Belgian Albums (Ultratop Wallonia)	127
Dutch Albums (Album Top 100)	23
French Albums (SNEP)	104
German Albums (Offizielle Top 100)	4
Hungarian Albums (MAHASZ)	6
Irish Albums (OCC)	2
Italian Albums (FIMI)	82
Scottish Albums (OCC)	1
Spanish Albums (PROMUSICAE)	42
Swiss Albums (Schweizer Hitparade)	4
UK Albums (OCC)	1

== Certifications ==
Region	Certification	Certified units/sales
United Kingdom (BPI)	Silver	60,000^{‡}
^{‡} Sales+streaming figures based on certification alone.
