= Biffy Clyro =

Scottish rock band

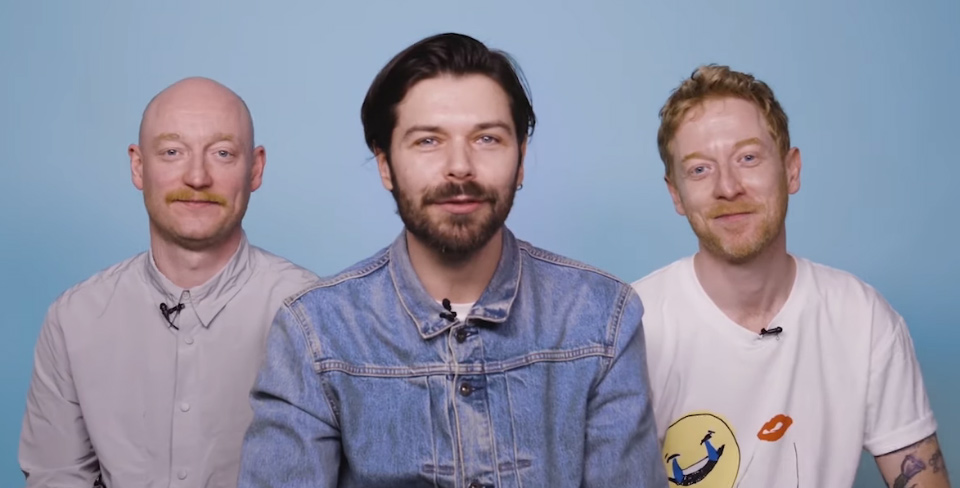
- Biffy Clyro in August 2020. From left to right: Ben Johnston, Simon Neil and James Johnston

Background information
- Also known as: Screwfish
- Origin: Kilmarnock, Scotland
- Genres: Alternative rock; post-hardcore; pop rock; art rock; post-grunge (early)
- Works: Discography
- Years active: 1995–present
- Labels: Babi Yaga; Electric Honey; Beggars Banquet; 14th Floor; Roadrunner; Warner
- Spinoffs: Empire State Bastard
- Members: Simon Neil; James Johnston; Ben Johnston
- Website: biffyclyro.com

Biffy Clyro are a Scottish rock band formed in Kilmarnock, in 1995. The band is composed of Simon Neil (lead vocals, guitar) and twin brothers James (bass, backing vocals) and Ben Johnston (drums, backing vocals). During live performances, the trio are joined by longtime touring musicians Mike Vennart (guitar, backing vocals) and Richard "Gambler" Ingram (keyboards, guitar), both former members of the band Oceansize. Currently signed to 14th Floor Records, they have released ten studio albums. Following their first three albums, the band expanded their following significantly in 2007 with the release of their fourth album Puzzle, which peaked at No. 2 on the UK Albums Chart and was awarded a Platinum certification by the British Phonographic Industry (BPI).

Their fifth album, Only Revolutions (2009) reached number three in the United Kingdom, and went Gold within days of its release before achieving double-platinum status in August 2011. The album also received a Mercury Music Prize nomination. Only Revolutions included the commercially successful singles "Mountains", "That Golden Rule", and "Many of Horror", all of which reached the UK Top Ten. The latter reached No. 8 on the UK Singles Chart after The X Factor 2010 winner, Matt Cardle covered the song, and became the UK number one Christmas single for the year 2010. In 2011, the band was nominated for the Brit Awards for Best British Group.

At the 2013 NME Awards, they received the award for Best British Band. Their sixth studio album, the double album Opposites was released in 2013, and was their first album to reach number one in the United Kingdom, and their second to reach number one in Scotland. Their most recent album Futique was released in September 2025.

== History ==
=== 1995–2000: Early years and formation ===
The first incarnation of what would eventually become Biffy Clyro was formed in 1995, when fifteen-year-old Ayr-based guitarist Simon Neil started playing his songs with Boyan Chowdhury (a founding member of the Zutons in 2001), then soon recruited friend Ben Johnston. Ben's twin brother James Johnston was soon recruited and the four musicians spent the next two years rehearsing, writing and covering songs. On 31 January 1995, they played their first gig under the name "Screwfish" as the support for a band called Pink Kross at the Key Youth Centre in East Kilbride, now known as Universal Connections East Kilbride. After Chowdhury's departure in 1997, the trio moved to Glasgow for studies, Neil attending the University of Glasgow, and the Johnston twins attending Stow College, studying Electronics with Music and Audio Engineering, respectively.

After playing gigs around Glasgow and receiving positive and enthusiastic reactions from audiences, the band were spotted by Dee Bahl, who soon became their manager. Bahl offered them a chance to release an independent single on Aereogramme's Babi Yaga record label: "Iname" was released on 28 June 1999, with Northsound Radio's Jim Gellatly (later of Beat 106 & Xfm Scotland) giving the band their first radio play. This first release led to the band being chosen by Stow College's Electric Honey record label to release a record: thekidswhopoptodaywillrocktomorrow was released on Nerosa on 13 June 2000, receiving airplay from BBC Radio Scotland DJ Vic Galloway. A few days prior to the release of thekidswhopoptodaywillrocktomorrow, the band were spotted at the Unsigned Bands stage at T in the Park 2000 by a Beggars Banquet representative, and were signed to the independent Beggar's Banquet soon thereafter.

=== 2001–2005: Breakthrough and Blackened Sky ===
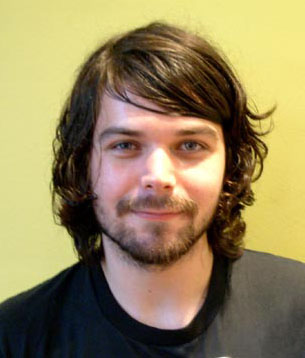
Lead singer Simon Neil (c. 2003)

On 9 April 2001, the previously unreleased "27" was released as a single. On 1 October 2001, a song from thekidswho... was re-recorded and released as a single, "Justboy"; this was repeated again on 4 February 2002, when the song "57" was released. On 11 March, the band's debut album, Blackened Sky, was released to generally positive reviews. It was around this time that the band began touring extensively, including supporting Weezer on 20 March at the Barrowlands in Glasgow. On 15 July, the fourth single from the album, "Joy.Discovery.Invention", was released as a double A-side with a newly recorded song called "Toys, Toys, Toys, Choke, Toys, Toys, Toys" (which would later also appear on their next album The Vertigo of Bliss).

They toured as part of the Kerrang tour in 2001 alongside Sunna and Hell is For Heroes, followed by their first UK wide headline tour later on in the year. In 2003, the band retreated to the Linford Manor recording studio in Great Linford, Milton Keynes, England, to record the follow-up to Blackened Sky. On 24 March, a new single was released called "The Ideal Height", followed by a further new single "Questions and Answers" on 26 May. The band's second album, The Vertigo of Bliss was released on 16 June, to positive reviews which focused on the more experimental style of the album in comparison to Blackened Sky, as well as the introduction of string sections.

After touring relentlessly for The Vertigo of Bliss, the band retreated to Monnow Valley Studio in Monmouth, Wales to record a follow-up album. As with the previous album, two singles were released before the actual album: "Glitter and Trauma" and "My Recovery Injection" on 9 August and 20 September respectively. An additional digital download was also released on 31 May, called "There's No Such Thing as a Jaggy Snake". On 4 October, the band's third album, Infinity Land was released, followed by the final single from the album, "Only One Word Comes To Mind", on 14 February 2005. On 16 February, the band performed a cover of Franz Ferdinand's "Take Me Out" live from Maida Vale on Zane Lowe's BBC Radio 1 show. Neil's side project, Marmaduke Duke, released their debut album in 2005, The Magnificent Duke, touring the UK with Marmaduke Duke, together with the Johnston twins accompanying on bass and drums.

=== 2006–2008: Puzzle and increased popularity ===
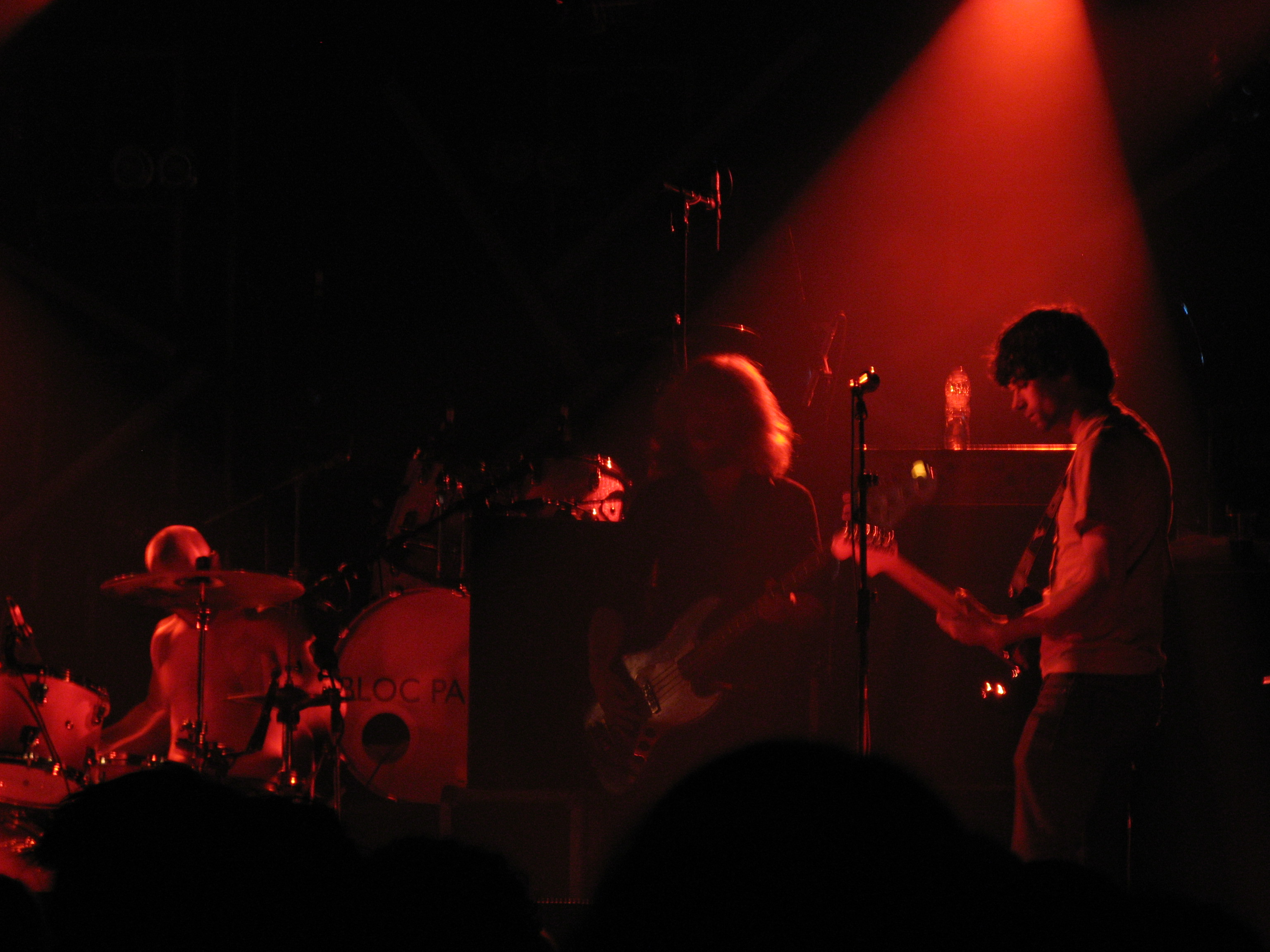
Biffy Clyro performing in May 2007

In 2006, Biffy Clyro left Beggars Banquet and signed a deal with 14th Floor, an offshoot of Warner Bros. In September, the band went to Canada to record their fourth album at The Warehouse Studio in Vancouver (where it was engineered by Mike Fraser), and The Farm Studio in Gibsons. From these sessions the song "Semi-Mental" was released as a digital download on 25 December. On 5 March 2007 "Saturday Superhouse" was released, reaching No. 13 on the UK Singles Chart.

Puzzle was released in June and helped the band to reach their highest UK Albums Chart position ever, hitting No. 2 in the first week of release, also reaching No. 17 in Ireland, and No. 39 in the overall world charts. The album is certified Gold in the UK, having sold over 220,000 copies, and as of February 2009 has sold over 300,000 worldwide. This album is notable for having somewhat more straightforward song structures and a more melodic overall sound than their previous work, while still retaining some more unusual elements. Puzzle was voted the best album of 2007 by Kerrang! and Rock Sound. On 25 August, it was announced that "Machines" would be the next single from Puzzle, which was released on 8 October.

Support slots for acts such as Muse (at the new Wembley Stadium), The Who, Red Hot Chili Peppers and The Rolling Stones were significant in expanding Biffy's fan base. The band also played the Download 2007, Glastonbury 2007, Reading and Leeds Festival and T in the Park for a record seventh time. The band opened for Linkin Park during January on their European tour. In 2008, the band toured with Queens Of The Stone Age on their European and North American tours for Era Vulgaris, and opened for New Jersey rockers Bon Jovi at Twickenham during the Lost Highway Tour. In December 2008 the band played their biggest headline shows, including a date at Glasgow's 10,000 capacity SECC.

=== 2008–2010: Commercial success ===
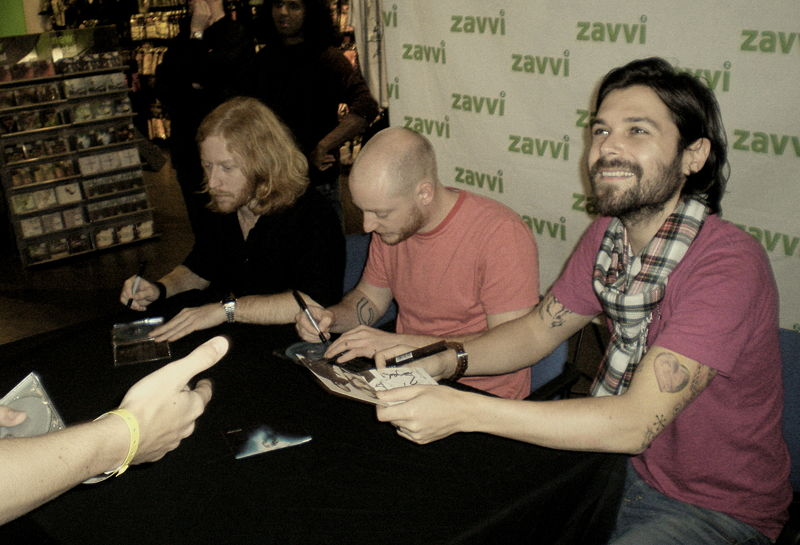
The members of Biffy Clyro signing fan autographs at a Zavvi store in 2008

The band released a new single entitled "Mountains" in July 2008, which reached No. 5 in the UK Singles Chart – the band's first song to reach the top 10, and their highest charting single to date. "Mountains" would later be included on their new album. In an interview with the NME, the band stated that they had started work on a follow up to Puzzle, with Simon Neil saying that the album would include some of the band's "heaviest riffs to date". In an interview with XFM, Ben Johnston revealed that the forthcoming album would be "Oli Coates", and that they already had 16 demos laid down. Simon Neil told Kerrang magazine about the new album on 8 December, playfully saying "The soft bits are softer, and the hard bits are harder...", mocking how bands always label their new albums the most heavy and yet melodic so far. The band worked with Puzzle producer Garth Richardson once again at Ocean Way studios.

A number of various videos were shown on the internet of them playing along to Shania Twain's "You're Still the One". A Kerrang! article, published in March 2009, stated that they planned to enter the studio in April, revealing a working title for the upcoming album: "Boom, Blast and Ruin". A series of weekly updates on their official site slowly revealed letters of the new album title, and, after Rock Sound mistakenly revealed the album's name as "Only Exceptions", it was officially announced that the album would be titled Only Revolutions. In July 2009, Kerrang! reported that they were filming the video for the first single from the album, "That Golden Rule". It was filmed on 1 July in London, with the band saying that the song is "like Kyuss and Tool playing with some Scottish freaks screaming over the top of it." "That Golden Rule" got its first play on Zane Lowe's Radio 1 show on 8 July, playing the song twice in a row; it was then announced that the single would be released on 23 August 2009. It went on to reach No. 10 on the UK Singles Chart.

Just before the official release of "That Golden Rule", Biffy Clyro performed on the main stage at V Festival, their second appearance at the festival (the first time being in 2006, in a much earlier slot; during their set on the Chelmsford leg, the band experienced power failures twice during the opening song "Glitter and Trauma"). "The Captain" was released as a single on 26 October 2009, following its first radio play on Zane Lowe's Radio 1 show on 8 September. Only Revolutions was released on 9 November 2009. On 24 February 2010, "The Captain" won an NME Award for Best Video. Biffy Clyro were confirmed to be supporting Muse for 14 dates on their European tour, including Wembley Stadium on 11 September, performing after I Am Arrows and White Lies. Biffy Clyro performed on the Main Stage at the T in the Park, Oxegen and Reading and Leeds music festivals in 2010. The band were also slated to perform at New Zealand's largest music festival Rhythm & Vines at Waiohika Estate Vineyard in Gisborne on 29 December, but had to pull out due to "minor medical procedures" required by two band members.

=== 2011–2014: Chart prominence ===
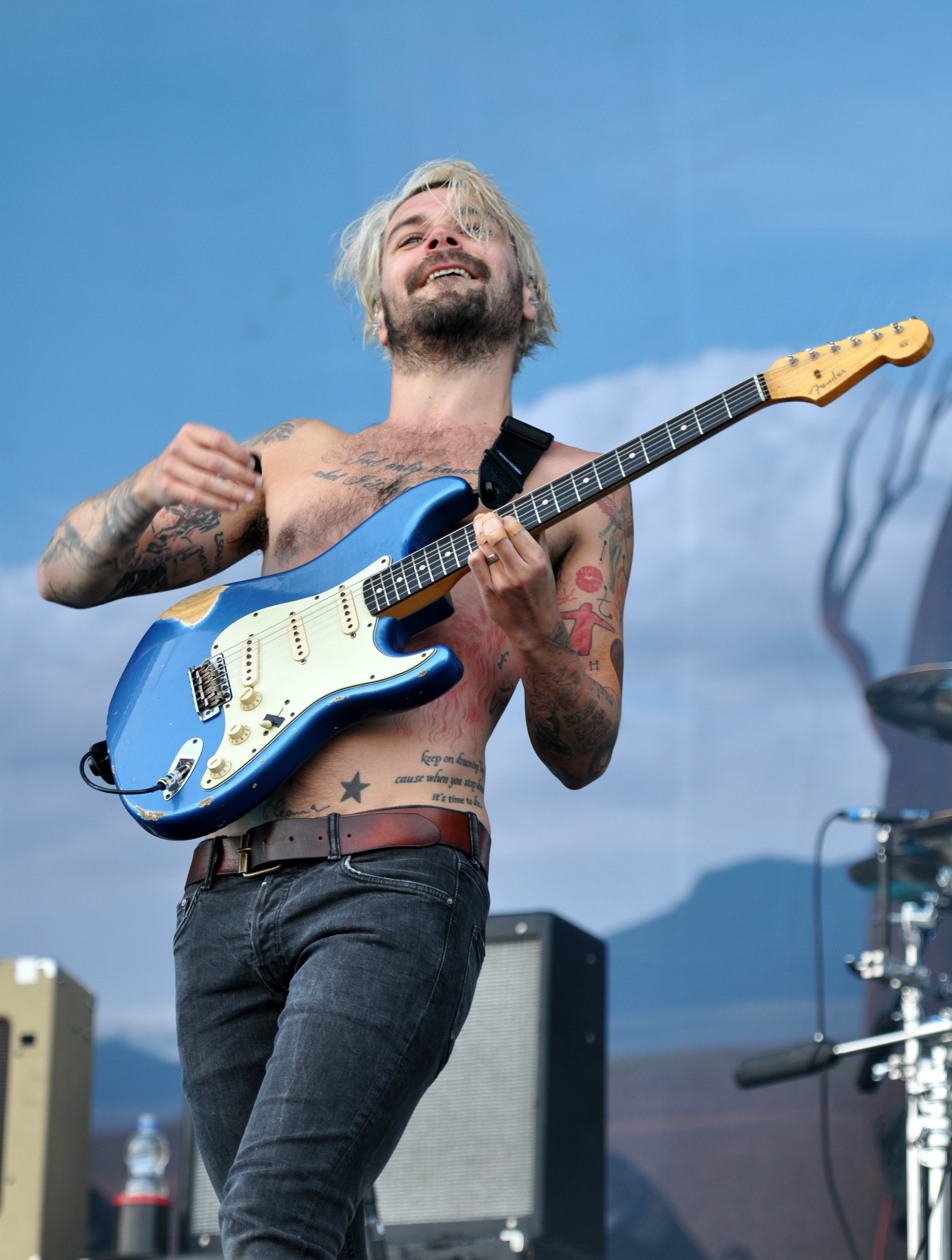
Lead singer Simon Neil at Rock am Ring 2013

On 2 and 3 July 2011 Biffy Clyro supported Foo Fighters in front of 130,000 fans (65,000 each night) at the Milton Keynes Bowl (National Bowl) in the U.K. On Saturday 9 July 2011, Biffy Clyro headlined the main stage (Apollo Stage) at Sonisphere Festival at Knebworth House. The following day, they headlined the main stage (West Stage) at Wakestock in Cardigan Bay, North Wales. Biffy Clyro opened for Metallica in Bangalore, India in 2011.

The band revealed via the NME that they would release two studio albums in 2012, The Land at the End of Our Toes, and The Sand at the Core of Our Bones. From 17 May 2012, the band allowed fans to watch the recording process of The Land at the End of Our Toes and The Sand at the Core of Our Bones via a webcam link-up on their official website. The official Biffy Clyro website | biffyclyro.com The live feed has confirmed the involvement of frequent Biffy Clyro producer Garth Richardson, who also produced Puzzle and Only Revolutions. On 30 July 2012, the band announced on Twitter that a new track titled "Stingin' Belle" would be given its official premiere in the UK on Zane Lowe's Radio 1 show the following evening, and that the music video for the song would be available from 9pm for 12 hours to members of the band's official fan club.

At 19:37 BST on Tuesday 31 July, Simon Neil confirmed on Zane Lowe's show on BBC Radio 1 that the new album title would be Opposites . Their new single titled Black Chandelier premièred on BBC Radio 1 on 19 November 2012. The band announced they would be playing a large arena tour through March/April 2013, including London's The O2 Arena, with City and Colour in support. On Sunday 3 February 2013, Opposites topped the UK Albums Charts, giving Biffy Clyro their first number one album. The next day, it was announced on BBC Radio 1 by Zane Lowe that they were the second headliner for Reading & Leeds Festivals. Biffy Clyro also headlined the second day of the annual Radio 1 Big Weekend festival on 25 May 2013 in Derry, as well as the Cape Town and Johannesburg legs of RAMfest 2014.

Simon Neil was interviewed by NME on 6 January 2014, and announced a planned Opposites b-side compilation, entitled Similarities, for release later in the year. Being interviewed for the article, lead singer Simon Neil stated that the band had come up with "six or seven" riffs for new material, although he did point out that their next album would not be recorded until at least 2015. Similarities was later released on 18 July 2014.

=== 2015–2018: Ellipsis and break ===
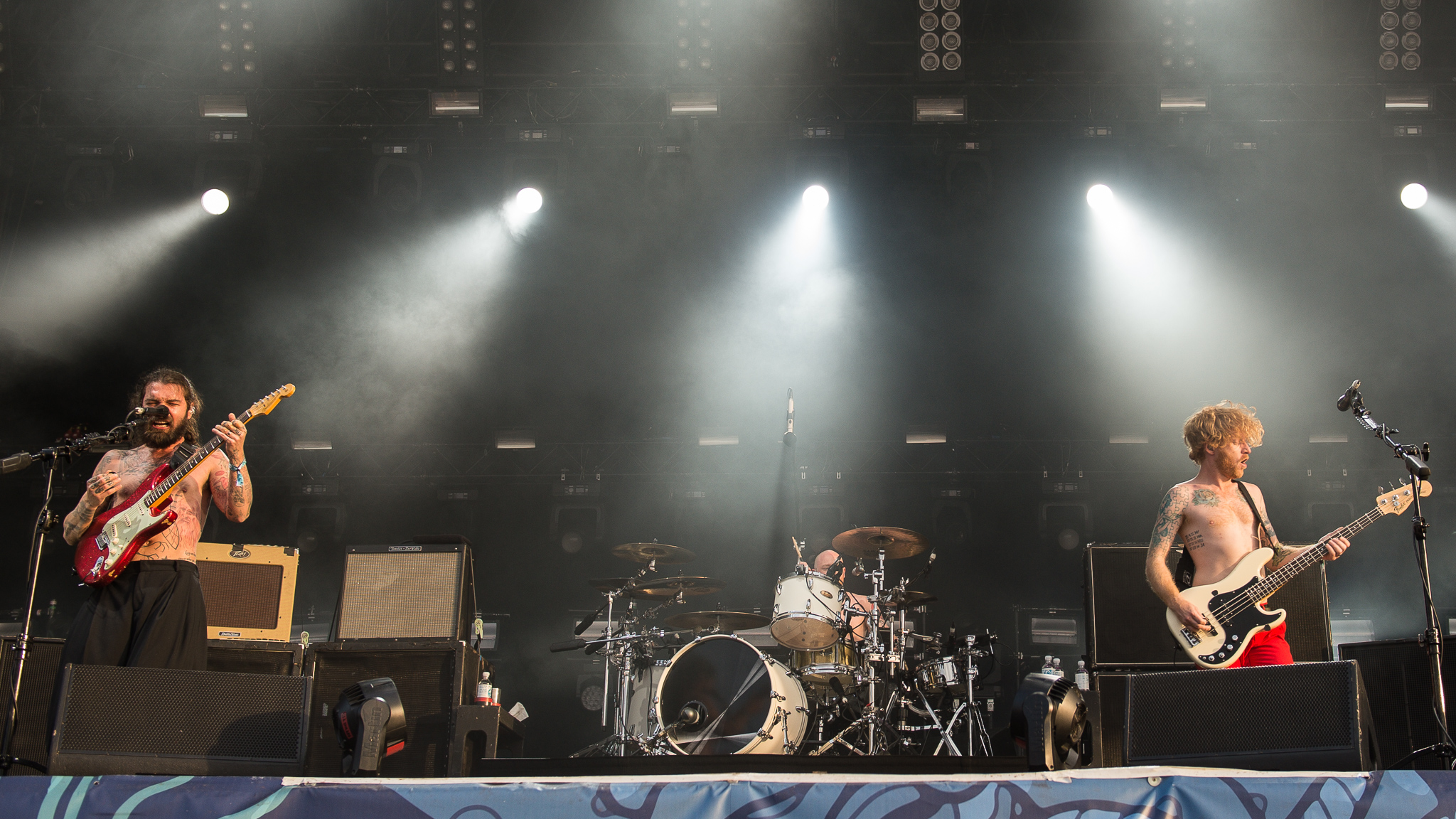
Biffy Clyro performing during the Ellipsis tour in Germany, July 2017

The band announced that 2015 would be their "year off". In an interview with 3FM in June 2014, Neil stated that "[the band] will take a quiet year next year and disappear so people don't get sick of the lovely Biffy." In the same interview he stated that they were working on about 19 new songs, but felt it was too early to play them live. He confirmed that a new album was coming, most likely towards the end of 2015. The first single "Wolves of Winter" was exclusively played as Hottest Record on Monday 21 March 2016 on Radio 1. On 21 March 2016, during the live premiere of "Wolves of Winter" on Hottest Record on Beats 1, Zane Lowe, Neil announced that the band's new album would be titled Ellipsis. The album, due for release on 8 July 2016, was made available to pre-order in a limited edition box set on the Biffy Clyro web store. Ellipsis was released on 8 July 2016, and debuted at number 1 on both the Scottish Albums Charts and UK Albums Charts.

In November 2016, Biffy Clyro were announced as the Saturday headliners of the Download Festival 2017. This marked their sixth appearance at the festival and their first headline performance on the main stage. To coincide with these headline performances, a UK arena tour was announced with Brand New as the support act. The tour culminated in a performance at London's O2 arena, in December 2016. The band performed at Glastonbury on Sunday 25 June 2017. Autumn of 2018 saw the release of the MTV Unplugged: Live at Roundhouse, London show on DVD and album. A European tour of the show soon followed plus a few other pieces that translated well acoustically.

=== 2018–2025: Subsequent releases ===
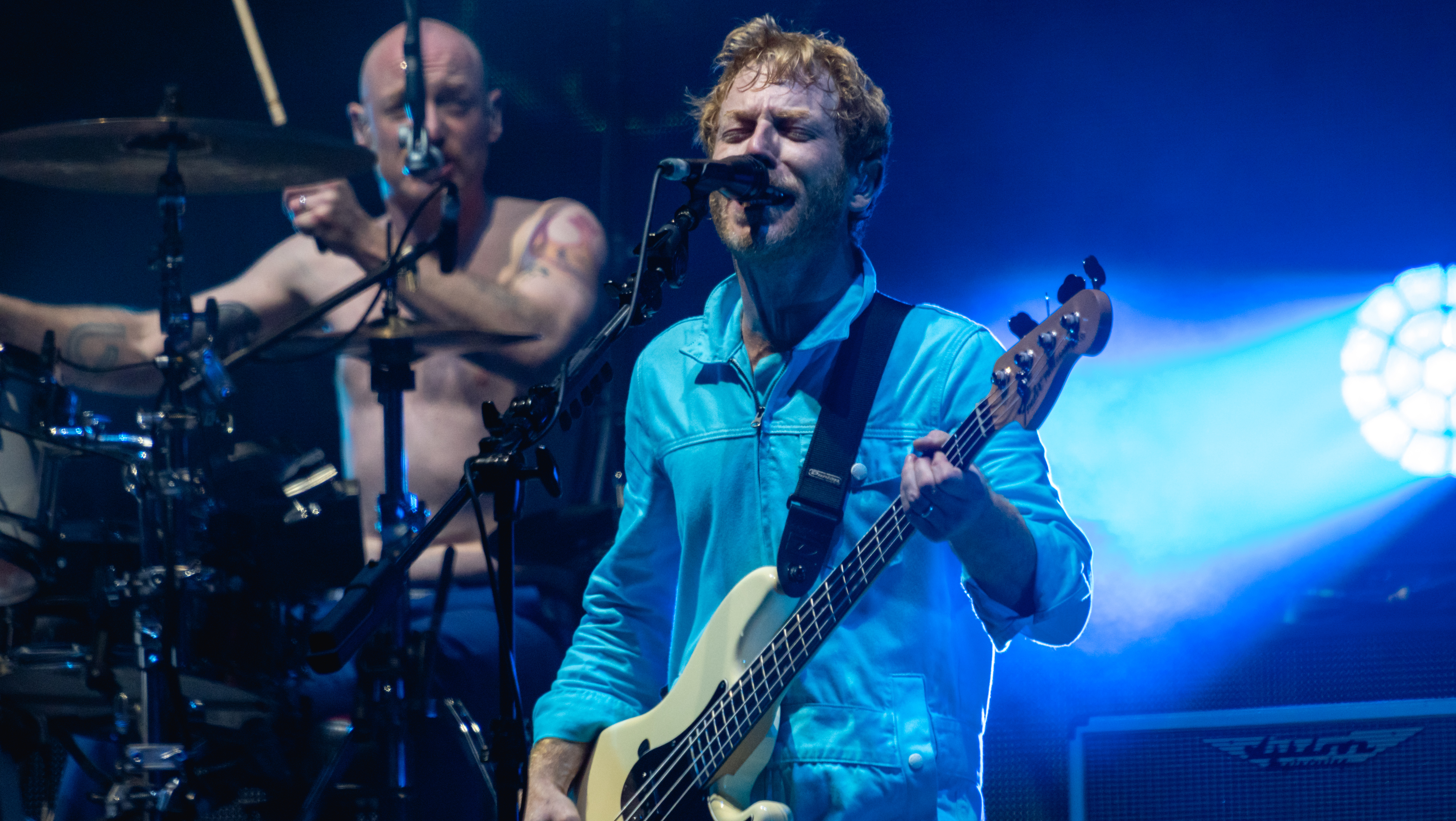
Biffy Clyro at the 2021 Reading Festival

In April 2018, Biffy Clyro announced that they were concurrently working on two albums, their eighth studio album with the working title Opus 8 (released in 2020 as A Celebration of Endings) as well as a soundtrack album. For the soundtrack album, they were working with Welsh director Jamie Adams producing a movie to go along with new, original music. The film, called Balance, Not Symmetry debuted at the Edinburgh Film Festival on 23 June 2019. The 17-song soundtrack album, also named Balance, Not Symmetry was released digitally on 17 May 2019 with a vinyl pre-order made available for release on 26 July. The film stars Laura Harrier, Bria Vinaite, Tasmin Egerton, Freya Mavor, Kate Dickie, Scott Miller, and Lily Newmark.

On 20 February 2020, Biffy Clyro released the single "Instant History". The track was taken from their eighth studio album A Celebration of Endings. The second single "End Of" was released on 5 March alongside the announcement of the album's title and the release date of 15 May, although this date had to be postponed to 14 August, due to the coronavirus pandemic. The third single from the album "Tiny Indoor Fireworks" was released on 14 May. A Celebration Of Endings entered at No.1 on the UK Albums Chart, making it the band's third consecutive No.1 album. The band had initially announced a UK, Europe and Australia arena tour, beginning in September 2020, although this was postponed due to the coronavirus pandemic. Instead, the band played a livestream concert from the Barrowland Ballroom in Glasgow, playing all the songs from their new album. They also announced a series of tour dates in smaller venues in April 2021, titled the Fingers Crossed Tour, though this was also postponed to October-November 2021.

The band contributed a cover of the Metallica song "Holier Than Thou" to the charity tribute album The Metallica Blacklist, released in September 2021. On 3 September 2021, they released the single "Unknown Male 01", alongside the announcement of another album titled The Myth of the Happily Ever After, which was released on 22 October 2021. In February 2022, Amazon Prime Video released an hour-long documentary about Biffy Clyro and the making of The Myth of the Happily Ever After, titled Cultural Sons of Scotland.

=== 2025–present: Futique ===
On 21 May 2025, the band played a secret show at SWG3 in Glasgow under their original name ‘Screwfish’. They debuted two new songs - "A Little Love" and "1001", the former of which was announced the next day as a new single. "A Little Love" released on 11 June 2025 with an accompanying music video. On 21 June 2025 the band started teasing what was speculated to be the title of their new album on their website by revealing one additional letter each day, culminating in an official announcement of the album Futique on 25 June 2025. On 27 June 2025, they played the Pyramid Stage at the Glastonbury Festival. On 31 July 2025, the band released "Hunting Season", the second single from Futique. Two weeks prior to the release of the album, on 5 September 2025, the band released the third single "True Believer". Futique was released at midnight on 19th September 2025.

The band released the song "Goodbye" along with its music video on 19 September 2025. The album debuted at number 1 in both their native Scotland and in the United Kingdom, becoming their fourth consecutive number 1 album in the United Kingdom, and fifth in Scotland. On 15 December 2025, Biffy Clyro announced that James Johnston would be absent from upcoming tours to seek treatment for addiction issues caused by long-standing mental health problems. To fill in on bass, the band invited Naomi Macleod, who has also played with Empire State Bastard, Simon Neil's other band with longtime Biffy Clyro touring guitarist Mike Vennart.

== Artistry ==
=== Name ===
The band have never disclosed where the name "Biffy Clyro" originated, and Simon Neil has said that it was "a stupid name" that was often "awkward" to explain its origins when the band started and when not many had heard their music. Whilst being interviewed on Soccer AM, the band said that they make up stories about how they are named because they are bored with being asked the same question. In a Soccer AM interview, the band stated that they named themselves after a footballer named Biffy Clyro who played for South Ayrshire football club Ayr United. Another story is that the band members were thinking about manufacturing Cliff Richard merchandise and they thought about the Laszlo Biro pen and thought of "Cliffy Biro" that was then accidentally spoonerised on a drunken night out to 'Biffy Clyro'. In another interview, the band claims that the name Biffy Clyro comes from an acronym for "Big Imagination For Feeling Young 'Cos Life Yearns Real Optimism". The band stated in an interview for BalconyTV that the name was that of a Finnish footballer from the 17th century.

On Off the Ball in August 2011, Ben Johnston said "Well it's a marriage of two words: Biffy is in fact the nickname of the spy who the James Bond novels were based on and Clyro is a village in Wales where both our families … used to go on holiday …". In an episode of Music Choice's Pop Quiz, Simon Neil said that Biffy Clyro is the name of a Scotsman that built his own rocket and was the first man in space.

=== Influences ===
In their early days, Biffy Clyro's biggest influences were Washington, D.C., post-hardcore bands.

According to Ben Johnston, the band has drawn from a wide range of acts:

"I guess we were all locked to Nirvana and that whole Seattle sound thing. That really woke us up to what was possible in terms of how simplistic you could be but still have power. How you didn’t have to be a virtuoso. We liked Guns N' Roses and stuff before that and then when Nirvana hit us at 14 or 15, everything changed. We started to think we could be a band possibly. Soundgarden, Nirvana, Pearl Jam, and then some more obscure American bands like Karate and Braid, and proggy stuff like Rush, Yes, and Dillinger Escape Plan. Then we get into more softer things like Red House Painters and more folky stuff. But we always wanted to be somewhere in the middle of that. I could play you parts of our songs that sound like Dillinger and some that sound like Red House Painters… the most un-pigeonhole-able band in the world."

Additionally, the band has cited Sunny Day Real Estate, Mineral, Faraquet, Far, Fugazi, Shudder To Think, Omar Rodriguez-Lopez of At the Drive-In and the Mars Volta, Girls Against Boys, Will Haven, Mogwai, the Beach Boys, U2, Marnie Stern, St. Vincent, Rush, Death Grips, Tears for Fears, Bonnie "Prince" Billy, Weezer and the Afghan Whigs as influences. Mark Z. Danielewski's second novel Only Revolutions was influential for the album Only Revolutions; the band have since met Danielewski, discovering that he was a fan when he attended one of their shows.

== Members ==
=== Current members ===
- Simon Neil – lead vocals, guitar, piano (1995–present)
- James Johnston – bass guitar, synthesizer, backing vocals (1995–present)
- Ben Johnston – drums, backing vocals (1995–present)

=== Touring musicians ===
- Mike Vennart – guitar, backing vocals (2007; 2010–present)
- Richard "Gambler" Ingram – guitar, piano, keyboards (2012–present)
- Naomi Macleod – bass, backing vocals (2025–present; substitute for James Johnston)

== Tours ==
- Early tours (1998–2001)
- Blackened Sky (2002)
- The Vertigo of Bliss Tour (2003–2004)
- Infinity Land Tour (2004–2006)
- Puzzle Tour (2007–2009)
- Only Revolutions Tour (2009–2012)
- Opposites Tour (2012–2014)
- Ellipsis Tour (2016–2017)
- MTV Unplugged Tour (2018)
- The Fingers Crossed Tour (2021)
- UK & Ireland Tour (2022)
- A Celebration of Beginnings (2024)
- The Futique Tour (2026)

== Discography ==
Studio albums

- Blackened Sky (2002)
- The Vertigo of Bliss (2003)
- Infinity Land (2004)
- Puzzle (2007)
- Only Revolutions (2009)
- Opposites (2013)
- Ellipsis (2016)
- A Celebration of Endings (2020)
- The Myth of the Happily Ever After (2021)
- Futique (2025)

== Awards and nominations ==
Biffy Clyro awards and nominations
Awards and nominations
Award	Wins	Nominations
Brit	0	3
MTV Europe	0	1
NME	4	5
Q	3	5
Radio 1 Teen Awards	1	1
Kerrang! Awards	4	8
Bandit Rock Awards	0	2
Barclaycard Mercury Prize	0	1

Totals (Note: Certain award groups do not simply award one winner. They acknowledge several different recipients, have runners-up, and have third place. Since this is a specific recognition and is different from losing an award, runner-up mentions are considered wins in this award tally. For simplification and to avoid errors, each award in this list has been presumed to have had a prior nomination.)
- Wins: 12
- Nominations: 26

MTV Europe Music Awards

Year	Nominee / work	Award	Result
2007	Biffy Clyro	New Sounds of Europe, Regional Competition	Nominated

Bandit Rock Awards

Year	Nominee / work	Award	Result
2009	Biffy Clyro	Best International Breakthrough Act	Nominated
2009	Only Revolutions	Best International Album	Nominated

Kerrang! Awards

Year	Nominee / work	Award	Result
2010	Biffy Clyro	Best British Band	Nominated
2010	The Captain	Best Music Video	Won
2011	Biffy Clyro	Classic Songwriter	Won
2013	Opposites	Best Album	Won
2014	Biffy Clyro	Best British Band	Nominated
2016	Biffy Clyro	Best British Band	Nominated
2018	Biffy Clyro	Best British Band	Won
2018	Biffy Clyro	Best British Live Act	Nominated

NME Awards

Year	Nominee / work	Award	Result
2010	The Captain	Best Music Video	Won
2011	Biffy Clyro	Best British Band	Nominated
2011	Biffy Clyro	Best Live Band	Won
2013	Biffy Clyro	Best British Band	Won
2017	Biffy Clyro	Best British Band	Won

Barclaycard Mercury Prize

Year	Nominee / work	Award	Result
2010	Only Revolutions	Album of the Year	Nominated

Radio 1 Teen Awards

Year	Nominee / work	Award	Result
2010	Bubbles	Best Song	Won

Q Awards

Year	Nominee / work	Award	Result
2010	The Captain	Best Track	Nominated
2010	The Captain	Best Video	Nominated
2011	Biffy Clyro	Best Live Band	Won
2013	Biffy Clyro	Best Album Opposites	Won
2018	Simon Neil	Fender Play Award	Won

BRIT Awards

Year	Nominee / work	Award	Result
2011	Biffy Clyro	Best British Group	Nominated
2017	Biffy Clyro	Best British Group	Nominated
2021	Biffy Clyro	Best British Group	Nominated
