= MTV Unplugged: Live at Roundhouse, London =

Live album by Biffy Clyro
- Released: 25 May 2018
- Recorded: 8 November 2017
- Venues: Roundhouse (London, England)
- Genre: Alternative rock
- Length: 62:57
- Labels: 14th Floor; Warner Bros.
- Director: Sam Wrench
- Producer: Sian Larkin (video)

Biffy Clyro chronology
Ellipsis (2016)	MTV Unplugged: Live at Roundhouse, London (2018)	Balance, Not Symmetry (2019)

Singles from MTV Unplugged: Live at Roundhouse, London
- 1. "Many of Horror" Released: 13 April 2018; 2. "Black Chandelier" Released: 4 May 2018; 3. "Mountains" Released: 18 May 2018; 4. "Medicine" Released: 24 May 2018

MTV Unplugged: Live at Roundhouse, London is the third live album and second video by Scottish alternative rock band Biffy Clyro. Recorded at the band's one-off acoustic show on 8 November 2017 at the Roundhouse in London as part of MTV Unplugged, it was released on 25 May 2018 by 14th Floor and Warner Bros. Records. The video was directed by Sam Wrench, produced by Sian Larkin & Executive Produced for MTV by Jeremy Davies and Albert Schilcher. The show won Best Live Concert at the 2018 UK Music Video Awards. Four recordings from the release were issued as digital download singles.

Upon its release, MTV Unplugged: Live at Roundhouse, London debuted at number 2 on the Scottish Singles Chart and number 4 on the UK Albums Chart – the highest positions of the band's live releases to date. The acoustic show and subsequent album release received generally positive reviews from critics, who praised the rearrangements of certain songs but noted a lack of dynamism in others. The show marked the debut of Balance, Not Symmetry track "Different Kind of Love".

== Background ==
Biffy Clyro performed a one-off acoustic show on 8 November 2017 at the Roundhouse in London as part of MTV's "Music Week" event under the MTV Unplugged banner. The band were inspired by Nirvana's 1993 performance for the show, which they reportedly rehearsed during their formative years. In an interview with RTÉ.ie, the group's bassist James Johnston recalled that "Nirvana's MTV Unplugged opened the world for us in terms of listening to acoustic guitars ... it taught us to open our ears a little bit". Frontman Simon Neil also cited the appearances of Neil Young, Bruce Springsteen and Oasis as highlights of the show's history, while Johnston highlighted those of Pearl Jam, George Michael and R.E.M. in addition to Nirvana. Speaking to Music Week, Neil explained that "our main aim was not to play the songs more than once ... I wanted us to capture that feeling – where if your voice breaks, if something goes wrong or you don't play the note right, that's it, that's the version".

In addition to tracks from Puzzle, Only Revolutions, Opposites and Ellipsis, the set also featured a cover version of The Beach Boys song "God Only Knows", which was Neil's first dance with his wife and the lyrics of which are in his first tattoo, as well as a new track called "Different Kind of Love", which was later recorded for Balance, Not Symmetry. The album was made available to pre-order from 13 April 2019, with all purchases accompanied by a digital download of the performance of "Many of Horror". A video for "Black Chandelier" was released as the second preview of the album on 4 May, followed by "Mountains", and later "Medicine" the day before the album's release. The full concert footage was premiered in the UK on the MTV channel on 25 May 2018, the same day as the album's physical and digital releases. In promotion of the release, the band later embarked on a short acoustic tour of the UK and Europe, with 14 shows between 15 September and 3 October 2018.

== Reception ==
MTV Unplugged: Live at Roundhouse, London debuted at number 2 on the Scottish Albums Chart, behind only Snow Patrol's Wildness. It also registered at number 4 on the UK Albums Chart, number 11 on the UK Album Downloads Chart, number 4 on the UK Albums Sales Chart, number 3 on the UK Physical Albums Chart, and number 1 on the UK Vinyl Albums Chart. Outside of the UK, the album reached number 5 on the German Albums Chart, number 7 on the Irish Albums Chart, number 11 on the Swiss Albums Chart, number 14 on the Austrian Albums Chart, number 37 on the Spanish Albums Chart, number 46 on the Italian Albums Chart, number 152 on the Belgian Albums Chart in the Flanders region, and number 167 on the Dutch Albums Chart.

== Track listing ==
All tracks are written by Simon Neil except where noted.

No.	Title	Writer(s)	Length
1.	"The Captain"		4:35
2.	"Biblical"		4:33
3.	"Re-Arrange"		4:10
4.	"Drop It"		2:46
5.	"Black Chandelier"		4:15
6.	"Folding Stars"		3:58
7.	"Different Kind of Love"	Neil; John Feldmann	3:22
8.	"Mountains"		4:10
9.	"God Only Knows" (The Beach Boys cover)	Brian Wilson; Tony Asher	2:23
10.	"Opposite"		4:15
11.	"Small Wishes"		3:16
12.	"Bubbles"		5:50
13.	"Medicine"		4:43
14.	"Many of Horror"		5:35
15.	"Machines"		5:06
Total length:			62:57

== Personnel ==
Biffy Clyro

- Simon Neil – lead vocals, guitar, design, art direction
- James Johnston – bass, backing vocals, design, art direction
- Ben Johnston – drums, backing vocals, design, art direction

Additional musicians

- Mike Vennart – additional guitar
- Richard Ingram – piano
- Susie Blankfield – cello

Additional personnel

- Ollie Nesham – recording
- Tim Summerhayes – recording
- Ben Kaplan – mixing
- Brian Lucey – mastering
- Sam Wrench – film direction
- Sian Larkin – film production
- Martin Craswell – film editing
- Richard Welland – design, art direction
- Andy Willsher – photography

Jeremy Davies - Executive Producer for MTV

== Chart positions ==
Chart (2018)	Peak position
Austrian Albums (Ö3 Austria Top 40)	14
Belgian Albums (Ultratop Flanders)	152
Dutch Albums (Album Top 100)	167
German Albums (Offizielle Top 100)	5
Irish Albums (OCC)	7
Italian Albums (IRMA)	46
Scottish Albums (OCC)	2
Spanish Albums (PROMUSICAE)	37
Swiss Albums (Schweizer Hitparade)	11
UK Albums (OCC)	4
UK Album Downloads (OCC)	11
UK Albums Sales (OCC)	4
UK Physical Albums (OCC)	3
UK Vinyl Albums (OCC)	1
