= Bria Vinaite =

Lithuanian-born American actress (born 1993)

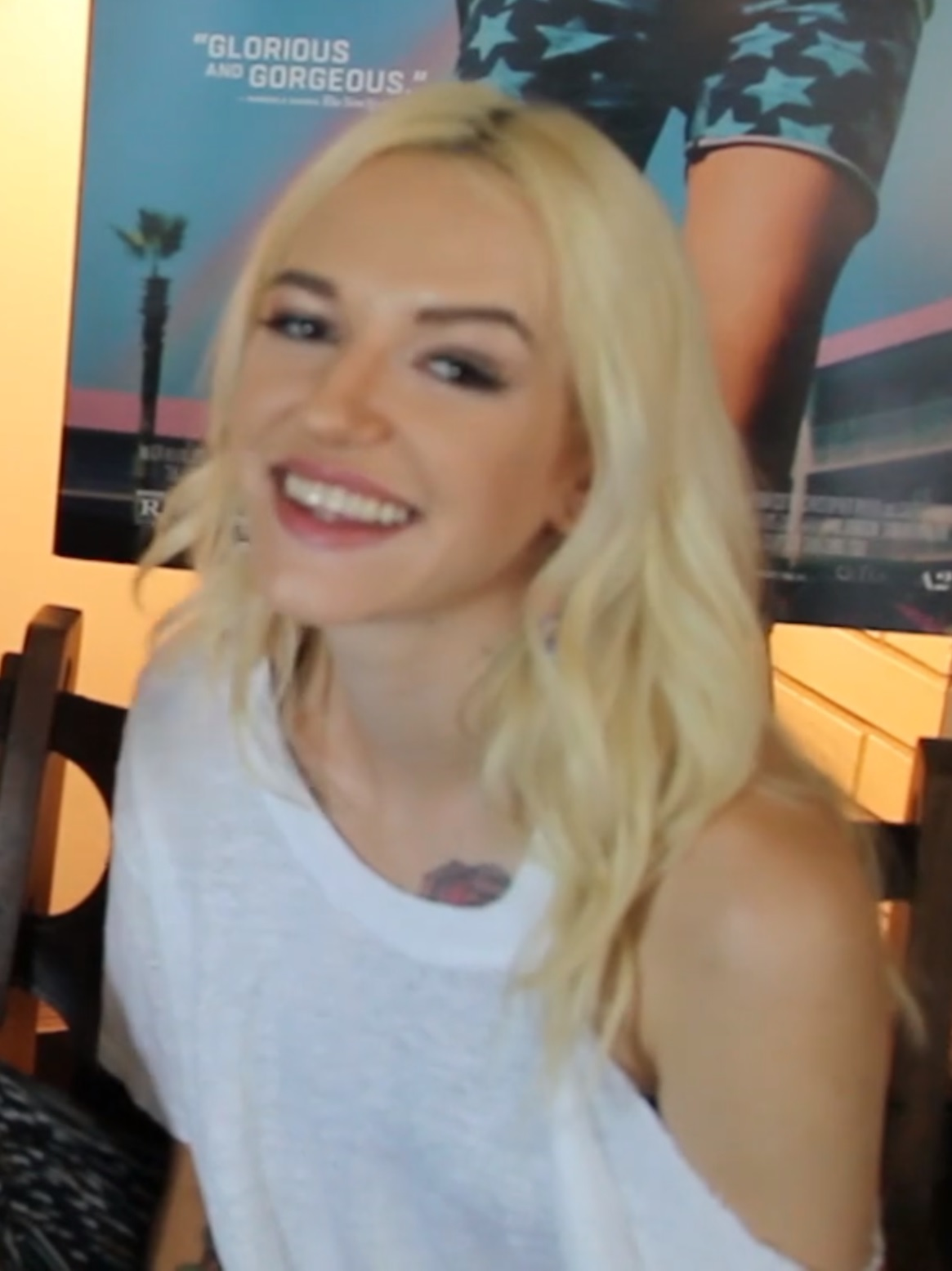
- Vinaite in 2017
- Born: Barbora Bulvinaitė; June 10, 1993 (age 33); Alytus, Lithuania
- Occupation: Actress
- Years active: 2016–present
- Spouse: Michael Voltaggio (m. 2022)
- Children: 1

Bria Vinaite (/vɪˈnaɪtjə/; born Barbora Bulvinaitė on June 10, 1993) is a Lithuanian-born American actress, best known for her debut role as Halley in Sean Baker's 2017 film The Florida Project.

== Early life ==
Vinaite was born in Alytus, Lithuania, and moved to Brooklyn, New York, around age 6 or 7.

== Career ==
The Florida Project was Vinaite's acting debut, where she played the lead role of Halley, a former stripper and single mother living at a budget motel close to Walt Disney World. The movie's director Sean Baker contacted Vinaite after seeing her in an Instagram post, where she documented her life so she could stay in contact with friends in New York City while living in Miami. Vinaite had three weeks of acting classes from acting teacher and associate producer Samantha Quan before filming began. Production wrapped in September 2016.

She made a cameo in Drake's music video for "Nice for What", released in April 2018. She also had a recurring role on the second season of The OA. Vinaite will next appear in Violent Delights directed by Taylor DeVoe.

== Personal life ==
Vinaite has many tattoos; she got her first at the age of 14. She was sent to boarding school around this time. She left home at 18, choosing to develop her own career rather than attend college. At 19, she started a clothing line called ChroniCal Designs, selling marijuana-themed bikinis and baseball caps.

Vinaite married chef Michael Voltaggio on November 18, 2022, in Hawaii. Vinaite and Voltaggio had a daughter in June 2024.

== Filmography ==
Film
Year	Title	Role	Notes
2017	The Florida Project	Halley	Nominated—Chicago Film Critics Association Award for Most Promising Performer; Nominated—San Diego Film Critics Society Award for Best Supporting Actress; Nominated—Georgia Film Critics Association for Best Supporting Actress; Nominated—Denver Film Critics Society for Best Supporting Actress; Nominated—North Texas Film Critics Association Award for Best Supporting Actress; Nominated—Chlotrudis Award for Best Supporting Actress
2019	Dalia	Dalia	Short film
2019	Lost Transmissions	Micah	
2019	Balance, Not Symmetry	Hannah	
TBA	Violent Delights	Skipper	Post-production
TBA	Adultland	Brittany	Upcoming

Television
Year	Title	Role	Notes
2019	The OA	Darmi	3 episodes

Music video
Year	Title	Artist
2018	"Nice for What"	Drake
2020	"Underdog"	Alicia Keys
2020	"Hate the Way"	G-Eazy
