= Balance, Not Symmetry =

2019 film directed by Jamie Adams

- Theatrical release poster
- Directed by: Jamie Adams
- Written by: Jamie Adams; Simon Neil
- Produced by: Jamie Adams; Maggie Monteith
- Starring: Laura Harrier; Bria Vinaite
- Cinematography: Ryan Eddleston
- Edited by: Adelina Bichis
- Music by: Walter Mair; Biffy Clyro
- Production companies: Dignity Film Finance; Northcott Films; Two Flowers and King Pictures
- Distributed by: Pinpoint
- Release dates: June 23, 2019 (EIFF); August 2, 2019 (United Kingdom)
- Running time: 96 minutes
- Countries: United Kingdom; United States
- Language: English
- Box office: $17,136

Balance, Not Symmetry is a 2019 drama film written and directed by Jamie Adams. The film stars Laura Harrier with Bria Vinaite, Kate Dickie, Tamsin Egerton, Freya Mavor, and Shauna Macdonald in major supporting roles. The film is about Caitlin (Harrier), an art student at the Glasgow School of Art who is struggling with the recent death of her father.

It had its world premiere at the Edinburgh International Film Festival on June 23, 2019. It was released in the United Kingdom on August 2, 2019, by Pinpoint (Film Distribution UK). The film was a critical failure with an almost universal negative reception. The film had a limited release in the United Kingdom only and made $17,136 at the box office.

The film's soundtrack album of the same name was released on May 17, 2019 to largely positive reviews.

== Plot ==
Caitlin, who grew up in New York before her family moved to Scotland, attends the funeral of her father, Leonard. Caitlin’s mother, Mary, delivers a graveside speech. Caitlin, supported by her best friend Hannah, returns to her third-year studies at the Glasgow School of Art.

Caitlin attends a seminar given by her lecturer, Fiona. Caitlin is still sad over her father’s passing and Hannah tries to cheer her up with an evening in. In high spirits, they see a guy spraying graffiti on the street corner and chase him down the street and into a party.

The next day, giving a lecture on abstract expressionism, Fiona tells the class that women have been overlooked and written out of history in the art books. It is up to them to change things, says Fiona. Caitlin meets with the guy from the party, Rory, and he invites her on a date to a museum. She accepts, and they talk about art as they view the pieces, agreeing that the time for it to be decorative is past—art should be what you see in the street each day.

Caitlin, who is struggling to settle upon her end-of-year presentation, says that she wants to paint more, and begins work on a huge canvas. Frustrated, she throws paint all over her work, scarring it. Mary, meanwhile, who is also an artist, is struggling to get back to work after Leonard’s death, and likewise trashes her creation. Caitlin gets a text message on her phone and rushes home to see her mum and finds her passed out, drunk. Awakening her, Caitlin explains that she can’t be there for her right now, and Mary assures her that it won’t happen again.

In another lecture, Hannah sits next to Stacey, another student in the class. Caitlin is again working on her canvas and again marring it as she loses her temper. Mary achieves her own small breakthrough as she begins to sketch. Stacey calls Hannah and they agree to go out to dinner despite Hannah having loose plans with Caitlin that evening. When Caitlin later texts her, Hannah texts back that she should join her at the club she’s in. Caitlin dances with Rory, while Hannah gets with Stacey. Both couples wind up back at the house, making out in Caitlin and Hannah’s respective bedrooms, though Rory is too drunk for things to progress.

The next morning, in the kitchen, Caitlin and Hannah have a vicious row in front of Stacey and Rory. It begins over who drank the almond milk but rapidly progresses to more personal resentments. Caitlin storms off to go and paint her canvas. Hannah, working on her own presentation, creates a mosaic of apology notes. She also leaves a conciliatory note in Caitlin’s bedroom, asking her to call her. Caitlin returns home to see her mum and pour out her heart, admitting that she feels threatened by Stacey. Mary soothes her and assures her that Hannah will be feeling every bit as bad.

Back in Glasgow working on her canvas, Caitlin is interrupted by Hannah arriving to apologize. They hug and make up. Rory also turns up later but Caitlin tells him that she just wants to do her own thing right now. For the class’s final lecture, they are visited by Turner Prize-winning Scottish artist Catherine Hendricks, who talks of how her troubled life and celebrated art intersect. Later, Catherine accompanies Fiona to take a look at Caitlin’s presentation. Caitlin tells Catherine of her father’s passing and of how she’s processed it through her work. Catherine informs her that its meaning will change over the years, and then invites Caitlin to be her assistant on a project in London. Caitlin accepts but says that she does her best work in tandem with Hannah, who is also invited along.

Caitlin visits her dad’s grave. She tells him that she is leaving for London and that it feels like things are finally falling into place. Hannah joins her at the grave, takes her hand, and together they walk to the car. They depart the cemetery towards a hopeful future.

== Cast ==
- Laura Harrier as Caitlin Walker
- Bria Vinaite as Hannah
- Kate Dickie as Mary Walker
- Tamsin Egerton as Fiona Miller
- Freya Mavor as Dolly
- Lily Newmark as Stacey
- Scott Miller as Rory
- Conor McCarron as Simon
- Martin Bell as Gavin
- Shauna Macdonald as Catherine Hendricks

== Production ==
In May 2018, it was announced Jamie Adams would direct the film, from a screenplay written by himself and Simon Neil, while Biffy Clyro would compose songs for the film, and Maggie Montieth would produce through her Dignity Film Finance and Northcott Films banner. In October 2018, Laura Harrier, Bria Vinaite, Lily Newmark, Freya Mavor, Tamsin Egerton, Kate Dickie and Scott Miller joined the cast of the film.

=== Filming ===
Principal photography began on September 17, 2018, in Glasgow, Scotland.

== Release ==
It had its world premiere at the Edinburgh International Film Festival on June 23, 2019. It is scheduled to be released in the United Kingdom on August 2, 2019, by Pinpoint (Film Distribution UK) Ltd.

A special event screening was confirmed at venues across the UK and Ireland on August 1, 2019 which featured an exclusive short acoustic set from the band Biffy Clyro and a Q&A session with cast members Laura Harrier and Bria Vinaite and director, Jamie Adams.

== Reception ==
=== Box office ===
Balance, Not Symmetry had its world premiere at the Edinburgh International Film Festival on June 23, 2019. The film had a one night only limited release in the United Kingdom, opening in just four theaters, on August 2, 2019. The film took in a total of $15,404 on its opening day. The film went on to gross $17,136 worldwide.

The film released to largely negative reviews. The story and acting in particular were panned. However, some reviewers praised the film. Although the film itself was a critical failure, the film's soundtrack album of the same name, Balance, Not Symmetry (album), received largely positive reviews and critics found that it was the redeeming quality of the film.

== See also ==
- Balance, Not Symmetry (album)
