= Balance, Not Symmetry (album) =

Soundtrack album by Biffy Clyro
- Released: 17 May 2019
- Recorded: 2018–19
- Studios: AIR (London, England); Monnow Valley (Rockfield, Monmouthshire, Wales); ICP (Brussels, Belgium)
- Genres: Alternative rock; progressive rock
- Length: 65:15
- Label: Warner Bros.
- Producers: Adam Noble; Biffy Clyro

Biffy Clyro chronology
| MTV Unplugged: Live at Roundhouse, London (2018) | Balance, Not Symmetry (2019) | A Celebration of Endings (2020) |

Singles from Balance, Not Symmetry
- 1. "Balance, Not Symmetry" Released: 16 May 2019

Balance, Not Symmetry is a soundtrack album by Scottish alternative rock band Biffy Clyro to the film of the same name, co-written by the band's frontman Simon Neil. Recorded at AIR Studios in England, Monnow Valley Studio in Wales and ICP Studios in Belgium with co-producer Adam Noble, it was released on 17 May 2019 by Warner Bros. Records. Initially available only for digital download and streaming, the album was also issued as a vinyl record on 26 July 2019.

Upon its release, Balance, Not Symmetry debuted at number 8 on the Scottish Albums Chart and number 36 on the UK Albums Chart. The title track, issued as the album's lead single, registered at number 65 on the Scottish Singles Chart and number 19 on the UK Rock & Metal Singles Chart. Media response to the album was generally positive: critics praised the variety of musical styles present on the soundtrack, as well as Neil's vocal performances and lyrical contributions.

== Background ==
Balance, Not Symmetry was issued on 17 May 2019, after the release of the title track the previous day. It serves as the soundtrack for the film of the same name, which was directed by Jamie Adams and co-written by Biffy Clyro frontman Simon Neil. Speaking about the writing process, Neil explained that "On meeting Jamie, we realised early on that we'd both had to deal with grief at a relatively young age and so it was interesting to talk about how we'd both dealt with it and the effect it had on us. And this is the main crux of the film, delving into the lonely world of grief and loss and coming out the other side." Contrary to the typical approach to movie soundtracks, Balance, Not Symmetry was written alongside the production of the movie, rather than after the fact; according to Kerrang! writer Paul Travers, "[Biffy Clyro] weren't just given a movie treatment and asked to write music to fit. Instead, the songs influenced the film and vice-versa, with some of the lyrics and dialogue apparently interchanging". Concurrently to the production of the soundtrack, the band worked on their eighth studio album A Celebration of Endings, which was released in 2020.

According to AllMusic's Matt Collar, Balance, Not Symmetry features "many of the stylistic hallmarks that have made the band one of the more interesting and unpredictable alt-rock acts of their generation, including mutative prog rock songcraft, infectious choruses, and hard-hitting riffs juxtaposed with thoughtfully emotive pop lyricism". Gigwise writer Dillon Eastoe noted that the album's lyrics focus primarily on "the thin lines between life and death, and finding solace and survival amidst the grief of losing someone", which he explained were "themes the film will confront". Travers added that "Lyrically, there's more of a storytelling bent, as you might expect. Simon is perhaps less oblique than usual, although no less poetic at times". Before the album's release, Neil explained that "I see it as six pairs of songs. There are a couple of songs that are acoustic and Nick Cave-y, there are a couple that are full-on electronic, a couple of songs that are weird hardcore songs, [and] a couple of big epic rock songs".

== Reception ==
=== Commercial ===
Balance, Not Symmetry debuted at number 8 on the Scottish Albums Chart, number 36 on the UK Albums Chart, number 6 on the UK Album Downloads Chart, number 3 on the UK Rock & Metal Albums Chart, and number 4 on the UK Soundtrack Albums Chart. Outside the UK, it reached number 52 on the Swiss Albums Chart.

=== Critical ===
Professional ratings
Review scores
| Source | Rating |
|---|---|
| AllMusic | 4/5 stars |
| Gigwise | 7/10 stars |
| Kerrang! | 4/5 stars |
| NME | 4/5 stars |

Media response to Balance, Not Symmetry was generally positive. AllMusic's Matt Collar praised the soundtrack as "a compelling album full of singer Simon Neil's passionate vocals that works as a worthy follow-up to any of their previous albums", selecting "All Singing and All Dancing", "Sunrise" and "Fever Dream" as highlights. Writing for music magazine Kerrang!, Paul Travers hailed the album as "inventive, atmospheric and engrossing as you might hope", claiming that "while this might not be a 'proper' Biffy Clyro album, they've certainly not brought their B game". Dillon Eastoe of Gigwise explained that "It's not quite a reinvention, but after the pressure of consecutive releases ... the surprise release and intensely personal nature of this film project allow Biffy to cast off some of the weight and free their limbs". James McMahon of the NME claimed that Balance, Not Symmetry was "easily the most innovative collection of songs the Scottish band have delivered in a good half decade", claiming that it "takes the band in some fascinating, previously unexplored directions" and "reinvigorates one of Britain's most special of bands".

== Track listing ==
All tracks are written by Simon Neil, except where noted.

| No. | Title | Writer(s) | Length |
|---|---|---|---|
| 1. | "Balance, Not Symmetry" | | 3:01 |
| 2. | "All Singing and All Dancing" | Neil; John Hill | 4:21 |
| 3. | "Different Kind of Love" | Neil; John Feldmann | 3:28 |
| 4. | "Sunrise" | | 5:01 |
| 5. | "Pink" | | 1:50 |
| 6. | "Colour Wheel" | Neil; Stuart Price | 5:07 |
| 7. | "Gates of Heaven" | Neil; Feldmann | 2:40 |
| 8. | "Fever Dream" | | 6:12 |
| 9. | "Navy Blue" | | 1:43 |
| 10. | "Tunnels and Trees" | | 4:07 |
| 11. | "Plead" | | 4:09 |
| 12. | "The Naturals" | | 4:19 |
| 13. | "Yellow" | | 2:25 |
| 14. | "Touch" | | 5:29 |
| 15. | "Jasabiab" | | 2:56 |
| 16. | "Following Master" | | 4:41 |
| 17. | "Adored" | | 3:46 |
| Total length: | | | 65:15 |

== Personnel ==
- Simon Neil – lead vocals, guitar, mandolin, keyboards, percussion, marimba, strings, clapping, production
- James Johnston – bass, backing vocals, clapping, production
- Ben Johnston – drums, percussion, marimba, keyboards, backing vocals, clapping, production
- Adam Noble – bass, keyboards, synthesisers, organ, programming, production, engineering, mixing
- Jakwob – keyboards, programming
- Fyfe Dangerfield – piano
- Blair Mowat – programming, orchestral arrangements
- James Hockley – programming
- John Prestage – engineering
- John Paul Reid – engineering
- Ted Jensen – mastering

== Charts ==
| Chart (2019) | Peak position |
|---|---|
| German Albums (Offizielle Top 100) | 68 |
| Irish Albums (IRMA) | 62 |
| Scottish Albums (Official Charts) | 6 |
| Swiss Albums (Schweizer Hitparade) | 52 |
| UK Albums (OCC) | 36 |
| UK Rock & Metal Albums (OCC) | 1 |
| UK Soundtrack Albums (OCC) | 4 |
