= Simon Neil =

Scottish musician (born 1979)

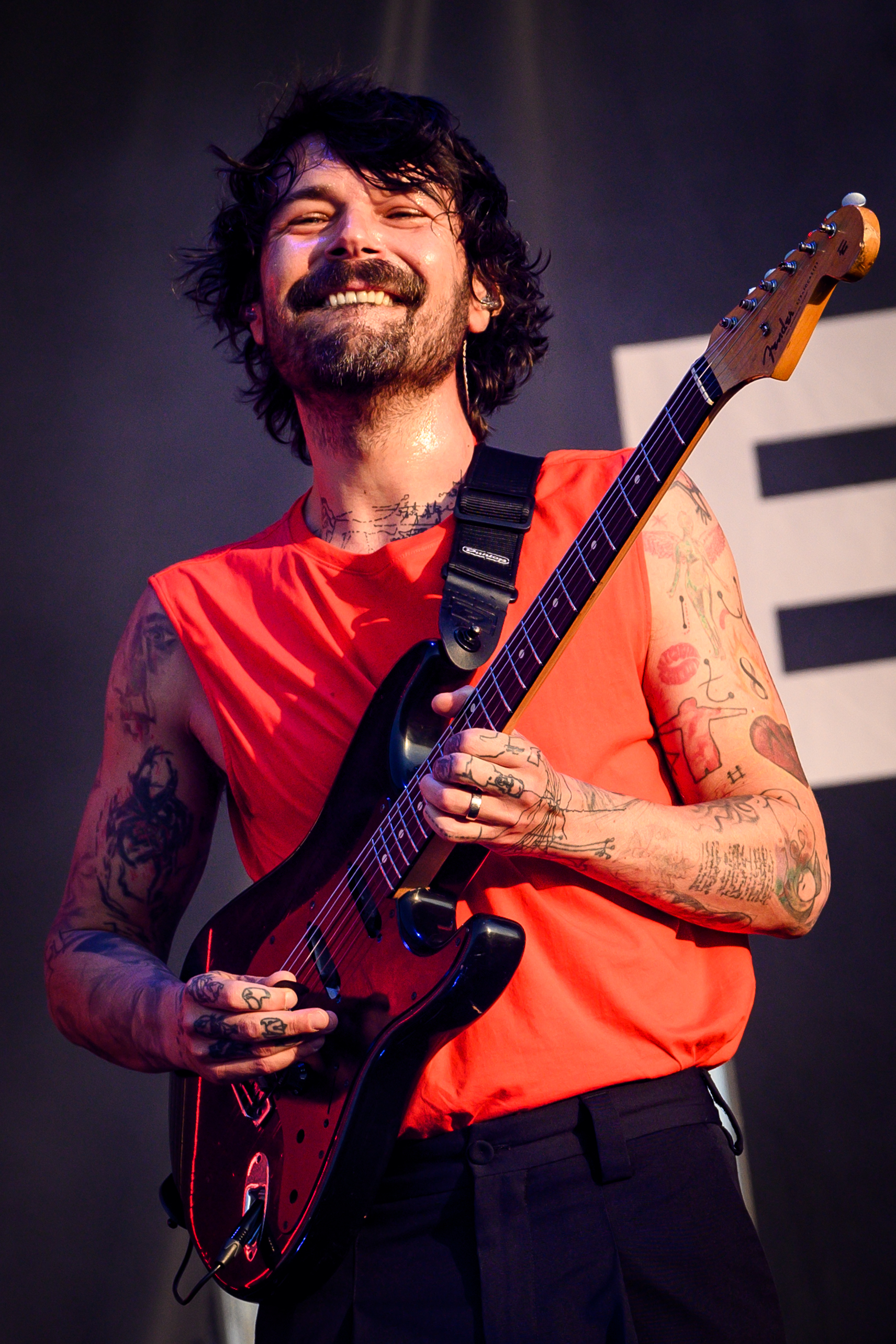
- Neil with Biffy Clyro at Southside Festival 2025

Background information
- Born: Simon Alexander Neil; 31 August 1979 (age 46); Irvine, Ayrshire, Scotland
- Origin: Ayr, Scotland
- Genres: Alternative rock; post-hardcore
- Occupations: Singer; musician; songwriter; record producer
- Instruments: Vocals; guitar; keyboards
- Years active: 1995–present
- Member of: Biffy Clyro; Marmaduke Duke; Empire State Bastard

Simon Alexander Neil (born 31 August 1979) is a Scottish musician, and songwriter, lead vocalist and guitarist for rock band Biffy Clyro.

Biffy Clyro has released ten studio albums, six of which have topped the Scottish Albums Charts (Puzzle, Opposites, Ellipsis, A Celebration of Endings, The Myth of the Happily Ever After and Futique). Opposites topped the UK Albums Charts, whilst Ellipsis topped the charts in Switzerland, Ireland, Germany, and the United Kingdom. A Celebration of Endings also topped the UK Albums Charts.

In 2003, Neil formed the side project Marmaduke Duke with JP Reid, releasing two studio albums The Magnificent Duke (2005) and Duke Pandemonium (2009). Another side project fronted by Neil, Empire State Bastard, released their debut studio album Rivers of Heresy in September 2023, reaching number three in Scotland, forty six in the United Kingdom, number three on the UK Rock & Metal Albums Charts and sixty-nine in Germany.

== Career ==
=== Biffy Clyro ===
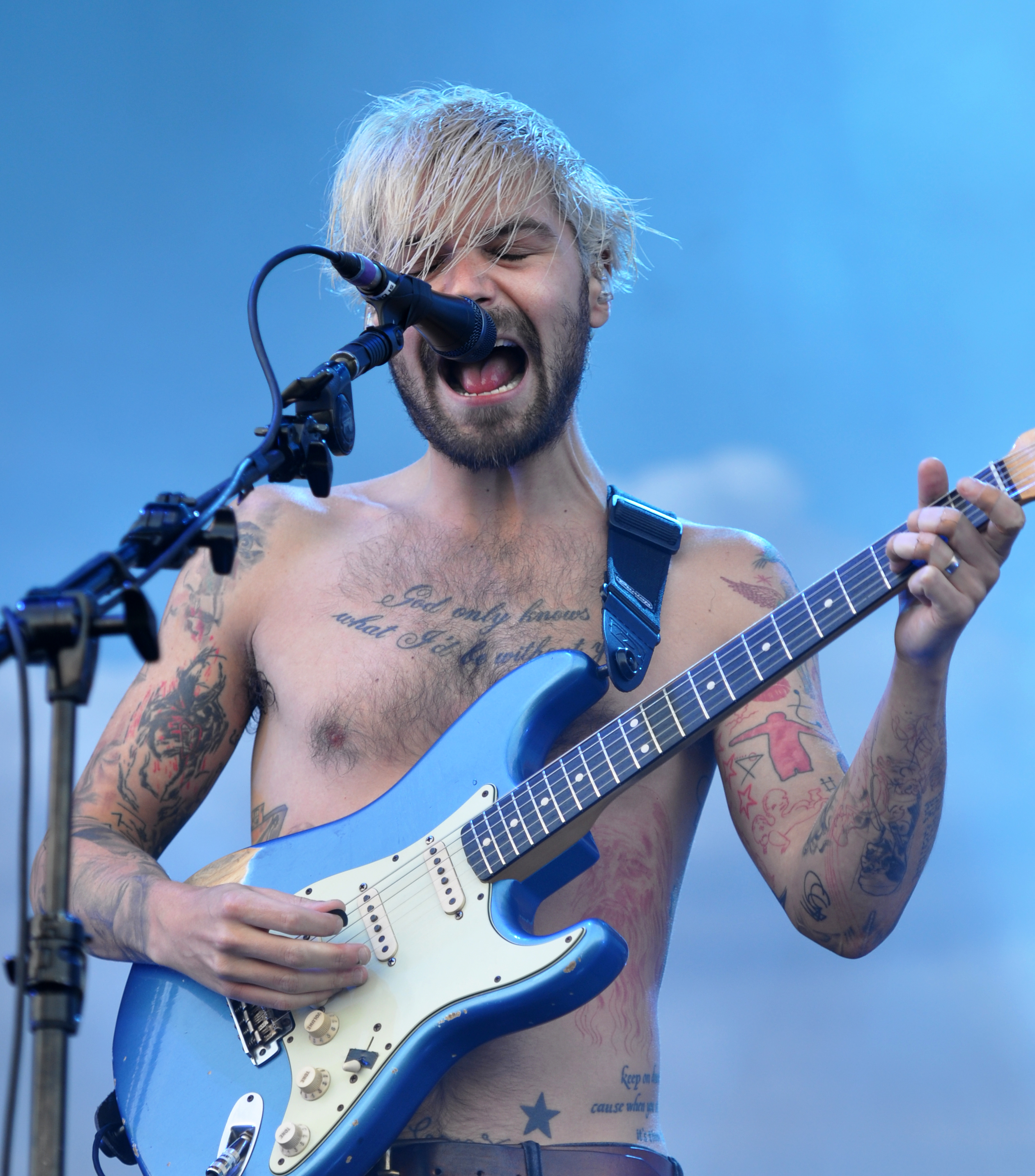
Neil performing with Biffy Clyro at Rock am Ring, Germany, 2013

Born in Irvine, North Ayrshire, Scotland and raised in Ayr, Neil formed a band in 1995 at 15 years old, recruiting Kilmarnock-based Ben Johnston and someone known only as Barry on drums and bass respectively, calling themselves Skrewfish. Barry was soon replaced by James Johnston, Ben's twin brother, and Biffy Clyro was effectively formed. In 1997, the trio moved to Glasgow, where Neil studied Electronics with Music at the University of Glasgow. He also studied Film and TV for a year before leaving to pursue music full-time. By then, Simon's musical tastes had expanded; in 2000, the band was spotted at the Unsigned Bands stage at T in the Park by a representative of the independent record label Beggars Banquet. Soon after, the band was signed to the label.

Biffy Clyro have since released nine albums, signed to a major record label, and toured relentlessly. Neil has stated that Biffy Clyro lyrics often come from phrases he writes down in a notebook he keeps by his bed. In 2011, the band was nominated for the Brit Awards for Best British Group. At the 2013 NME Awards, they received the award for Best British Band. On 25 August 2013 Biffy Clyro headlined the main stage at Reading and Leeds Festival.

As of 2021, in total, the band have spent 165 weeks in the top seventy-five of the UK Album Charts, with three of those weeks being at the top position at number one and 76 weeks within the main top forty of the album charts. The band's singles have spent a total of 79 weeks in the UK Singles Charts, with six weeks in the top ten and 42 in the top forty.

=== Marmaduke Duke ===
Neil plays with JP Reid of fellow Ayrshire group Sucioperro in Marmaduke Duke, under the pseudonym "The Atmosphere", which released their first album, The Magnificent Duke, in 2005. It was announced in late 2008 that the Duke was to make a return in 2009 with the follow-up album and second in the trilogy, Duke Pandemonium. The first single from the second album, "Kid Gloves" was released on 9 February 2009. Marmaduke Duke have thus far only played two small tours, during which they played at venues in Edinburgh, Dundee, London, Manchester, Glasgow, Newcastle, Cardiff, and Birmingham. On 9 June 2009, they were added to the Reading & Leeds Festival lineup, headlining the Festival Republic Stage on the Friday in Reading and the Sunday in Leeds. They also played the T in the Park festival in 2009, on the Radio 1/NME stage.

Live, the group consists of JP Reid (vocals, guitar) and Simon Neil (vocals, synth, guitar and bass). The duo are accompanied by James Johnston (bass, vocals) and drummers Fergus Munro and Ben Johnston. There is usually also a cloaked/masked figure on stage during performances, known only as "The Duke"; played by Sucioperro's ex-bassist Michael Logg (also known as "The Big Slice"). This character might be construed as the band's own version of Public Enemy's Flavor Flav or the Happy Mondays' Bez.

Regarding the inclusion of Ben and James, Neil's Biffy Clyro bandmates, Neil states: "It wouldn't feel right to be out and playing without them, you know?".

=== Empire State Bastard ===
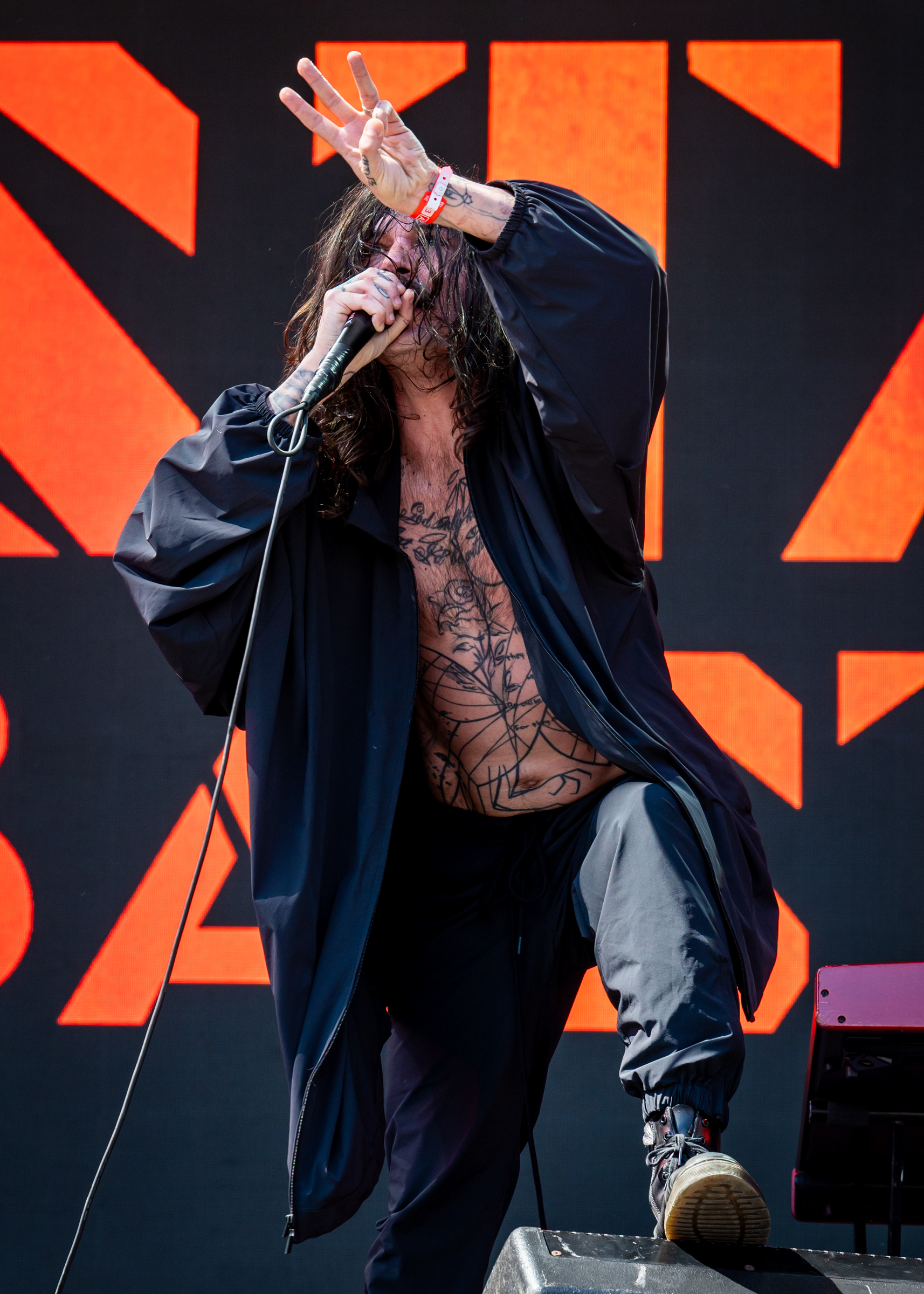
Neil performing with Empire State Bastard at Tons of Rock 2024

Empire State Bastard is an extreme metal duo composed of Neil and ex-Oceansize frontman Mike Vennart. The project has been described as "grindcore extreme metal" by Neil, with Vennart writing the songs and recording all guitars, and Neil focused on vocals and lyrics. The band currently tours with Dave Lombardo on drums and Naomi Macleod on bass. Empire State Bastard released their debut single "Harvest" in March 2023, with their debut album Rivers of Heresy released in September 2023.

=== Solo career ===
Neil performs under the name ZZC. His debut single, "To the Bone", was used in the BBC's 'Radio 1 Rescores: Drive (curated by Zane Lowe)' project. In 2017, Neil released a 7-minute instrumental track entitled "The Myth" under the ZZC moniker. Two tracks from an unreleased ZZC solo album, "Plead" and "Fever Dream" were released on the 2019 Biffy Clyro soundtrack album Balance, Not Symmetry.

== Personal life ==
Neil lives in Ayr with his wife Francesca, whom he married at St. Columba Church in Ayr on 5 January 2008. The song "God Only Knows" by The Beach Boys was used for their first dance, and Neil has the song's chorus, "God only knows what I'd be without you", tattooed on his chest.

In 2021, he presented a series of shows on BBC Radio Scotland. Neil is a fan of Rangers F.C. and attended matches at Ibrox Stadium in his youth.

Neil appears in Forza Horizon 6 (2026) as the DJ of the in-game rock radio station Horizon XS.

== Musical equipment used ==
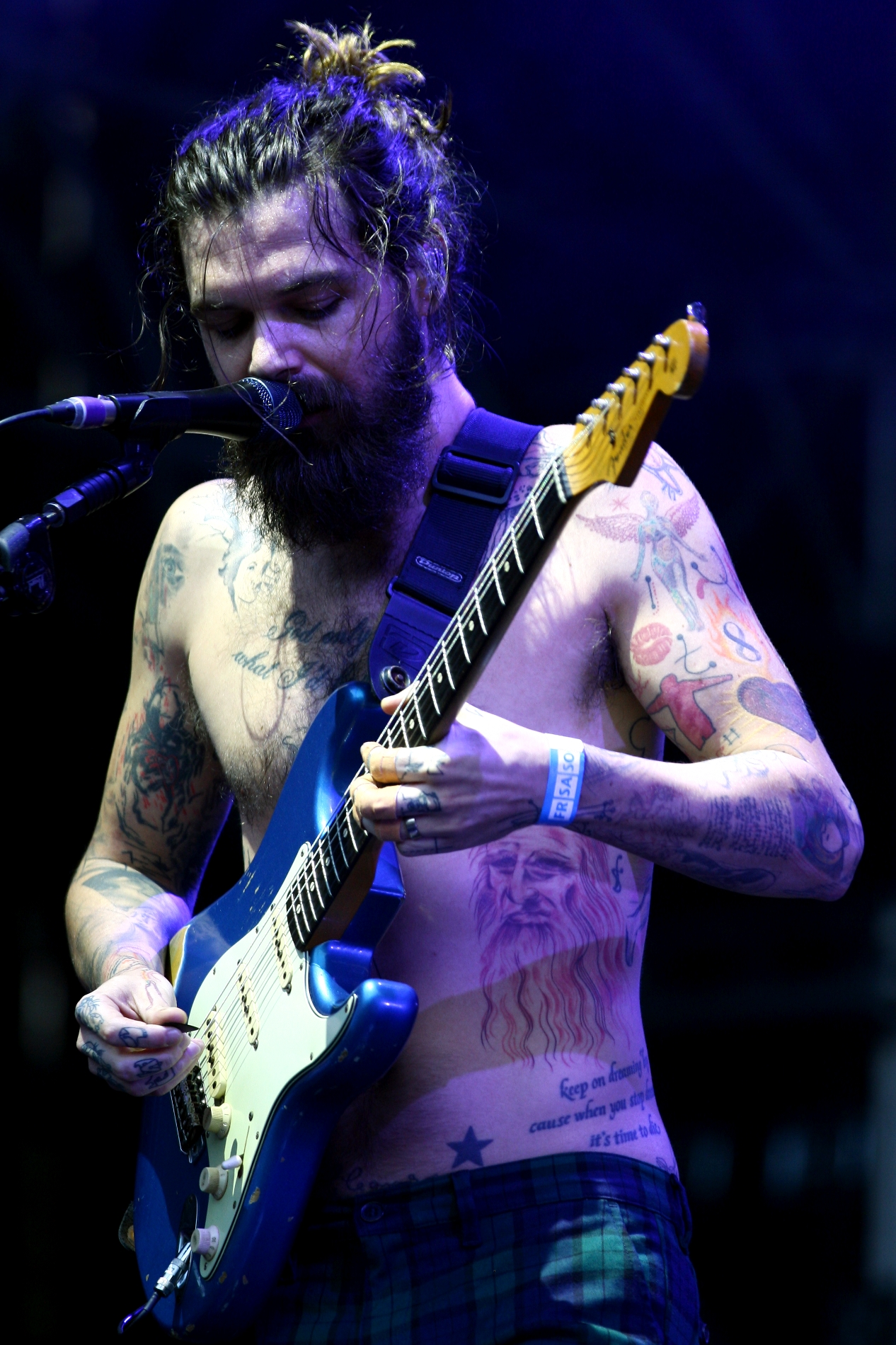
Neil performing with Biffy Clyro, using one of his many guitars

The following is a list of musical equipment used by Simon Neil:

=== Guitars ===
Electric

- Fender Standard Stratocasters – Various different Mexican models, including White, Red, Sunburst (with neck pickup & controls removed), Black, and Metallic Blue.
- Fender 1960 Custom Shop Stratocasters – Fiesta Red, Frost Metallic, Lake Placid Blue, and White.
- Fender 50s Stratocaster Relic
- Fender Telecaster Standard – USA model, owned by James Johnston, three tone sunburst, can be seen in the music video for "Living is a Problem Because Everything Dies".
- Fender Telecaster '62 Custom – Japanese model, three tone sunburst, can be seen in the music video for "Only One Word Comes to Mind".
- Fender Telecaster Custom 1972 reissue, black. Can be seen in the music video for "Mountains".
- Squier Simon Neil Signature Stratocaster
- Patrick Eggle New York – Red.
- Gretsch White Falcon Used live for the song "Diary of Always" and is seen in the music video for "Folding Stars"
- Gibson ES-335 – used live for "God & Satan"
- Gretsch G2420T – used for music video of "Howl".

=== Effects pedals ===
- Boss TU-2 Chromatic Tuner
- Boss MD-2 Distortion
- Boss MT-2 Metal Zone
- Boss DD-6 Digital Delay
- Boss LS-2 Line Selector
- Origin Effects Cali76 Compressor

=== Previous effects pedals ===
- Boss DS-1 Distortion
- Boss HM-2 Heavy Metal
- Dunlop Cry Baby Wah Wah
- Electro Harmonix Micro POG

=== Amplifiers ===
- Peavey Delta Blues Combo
- Fender Hot Rod Deville 4x10 Combo
- Marshall 1959SLP Head
- Peavey Classic Head and Peavey Classic 412 Cabinet
- Hayden MoFo 30W tube head with Hayden 4x12
- Fender Super Sonic 100 BLK Head
- Kemper Profiler Head

== Discography ==
=== Biffy Clyro ===
- Blackened Sky (2002)
- The Vertigo of Bliss (2003)
- Infinity Land (2004)
- Puzzle (2007)
- Only Revolutions (2009)
- Opposites (2013)
- Ellipsis (2016)
- MTV Unplugged: Live at Roundhouse, London (2018)
- Balance, Not Symmetry (2019)
- A Celebration of Endings (2020)
- The Myth of the Happily Ever After (2021)
- Futique (2025)

=== Marmaduke Duke ===
- The Magnificent Duke (2005)
- Duke Pandemonium (2009)

=== Empire State Bastard ===
- Rivers of Heresy (2023)

=== Other appearances ===
Year	Song	Artist	Album
2001	"Zionist Timing"	Aereogramme	A Story in White
2002	"Hangover"	Sucioperro	Why Bliss Destroy
2002	"Love in the Guise of Friendship"	Sucioperro	Why Bliss Destroy
2002	"Capable of More"	Sucioperro	Why Bliss Destroy
2009	"Graves"	Gallows	Grey Britain
2010	"It's My Tail and I'll Chase It If I Want To"	Oceansize	Self Preserved While the Bodies Float Up
2014	"Sun Riders"	Krokodil	Nachash
2016	"Reason to Stay"	Good Charlotte	Youth Authority
2020	"Halogen Eye"	O'Brother	You and I
2021	"Goliath"	Architects	For Those That Wish to Exist
2021	"Nervous"	While She Sleeps	Sleeps Society
2021	"What Matters"	Laura Mvula	Pink Noise
2022	"The Resurrectionists"	Frank Turner	FTHC
2022	"Superman"	Goldfinger	Never Look Back (Deluxe Edition)
2023	”Fires”	Nathan Connolly	The Strange Order of Things
