= Ben Johnston (Scottish musician) =

Scottish drummer, member of Biffy Clyro (born 1980)

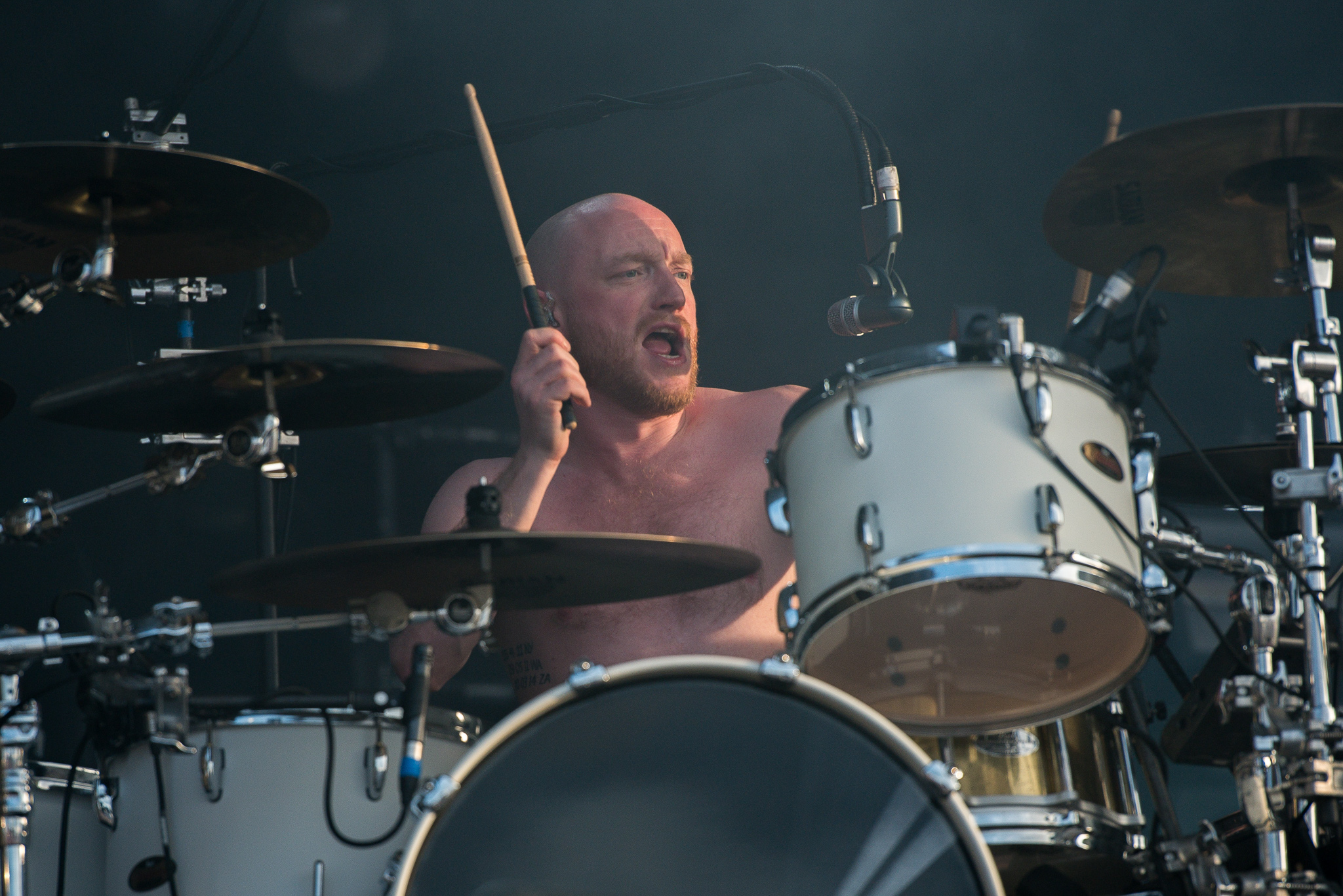
- Johnston with Biffy Clyro, Germany, 2017

Background information
- Born: Ben Hamilton Johnston; 25 April 1980 (age 46)
- Origin: Kilmarnock, Ayrshire, Scotland
- Genres: Rock, New prog
- Occupation: Musician
- Instruments: Drums, Percussion, Vocals
- Years active: 1995–present
- Labels: Beggars Banquet; 14th Floor; Warner
- Member of: Biffy Clyro

Ben Hamilton Johnston (born 25 April 1980) is a drummer, vocalist, songwriter and member of Scottish group Biffy Clyro.

== Early life ==
Johnston was born and raised in Carmunnock, Glasgow before the family moved to Kilmarnock, with his twin brother James (who became the bassist for Biffy Clyro), and his younger brother, Adam (who used to be Biffy Clyro's drum tech).

== Career ==
Having previously played drums with schoolfriend Simon Neil and brother James Johnston in a band called Skrewfish in 1995, Simon moved to Glasgow while the brothers stayed in Ayrshire. They were discovered by manager Dee Bahl and then signed to Beggars Banquet in 2001. Johnston plays drums when the conceptual rock duo Marmaduke Duke plays live. When he was in college he fronted a Rage Against the Machine tribute band Raj Against The Shereen, as revealed in an interview with Biffy Clyro at Reading Festival where they (Biffy Clyro) performed a cover version of the song "Killing in the Name".

== Personal life ==
Johnston is a fan of Scottish football club Kilmarnock. In January 2011 was asked by the club to take part in the half time 'Cross Bar Challenge'. He scored on Soccer AM whilst sporting a Kilmarnock F.C. strip. Johnston also took part in Kilmarnock F.C.'s pre season open day football match, alongside his band mates, with Johnston kicking off the match.

== Musical equipment used ==
The following is a list of musical equipment used by Ben Johnston.

=== Cymbals ===
- Ben Johnston is endorsed by Sabian (According to ).
  - 6" AAX Splash
  - 8" AA China Splash
  - 14" Legacy Hi-Hats
  - 17" AAX X-Plosion Crash
  - 18" AAX X-Plosion Crash
  - 18" AAX X-Plosion China
  - 19" AAX X-Plosion Crash
  - 19" Paragon Chinese
  - 21" HHX Raw Bell Dry Ride

=== Drums ===
Johnston is also endorsed by Pearl.

- Pearl Reference Kit colour:Rootbear Fade
  - Pearl Chad Smith Signature 14x5.5 Snare
  - 22x18" Bass drum, 12x9" Rack tom, 14x14" and 16x16" floor toms
  - Pearl Eliminator Double Bass Pedal

Biffy's Tour Manager Neil told fans on the BC forum that Ben is now using a 'Pearl Eric Singer Signature Snare Drum' and is waiting for a new totally custom Pearl Masters Kit

New Kit

Pearl Masters Colour :Black

22x18" Bass drum, 12x8" Rack tom, 14x14" and 16x16" floor toms

  - Pearl Eliminator Double Bass Pedal

Drum Heads: Bass Drum: BATTER: Aquarian coated superkick 2 RESONANT: Coated Pearl Masters Pro Tone Snare: BATTER: Aquarian coated Hi-Energy RESONANT: Hi-Performance Snare Bottom Rack tom, first floor and second floor: BATTER: Remo Pinstripes RESONANT: Remo Ambassador

=== Other ===
- The Neil Peart signature series drumstick
- Angel AX25K Glockenspiel
- Fender CD-140SCE Can Be Seen Hanging on His Wall in the Live Lounge Videos
- Johnston also plays a customised Cajon when Biffy Clyro are playing acoustically.
