= James Johnston (Scottish musician) =

Scottish bassist, member of Biffy Clyro (born 1980)

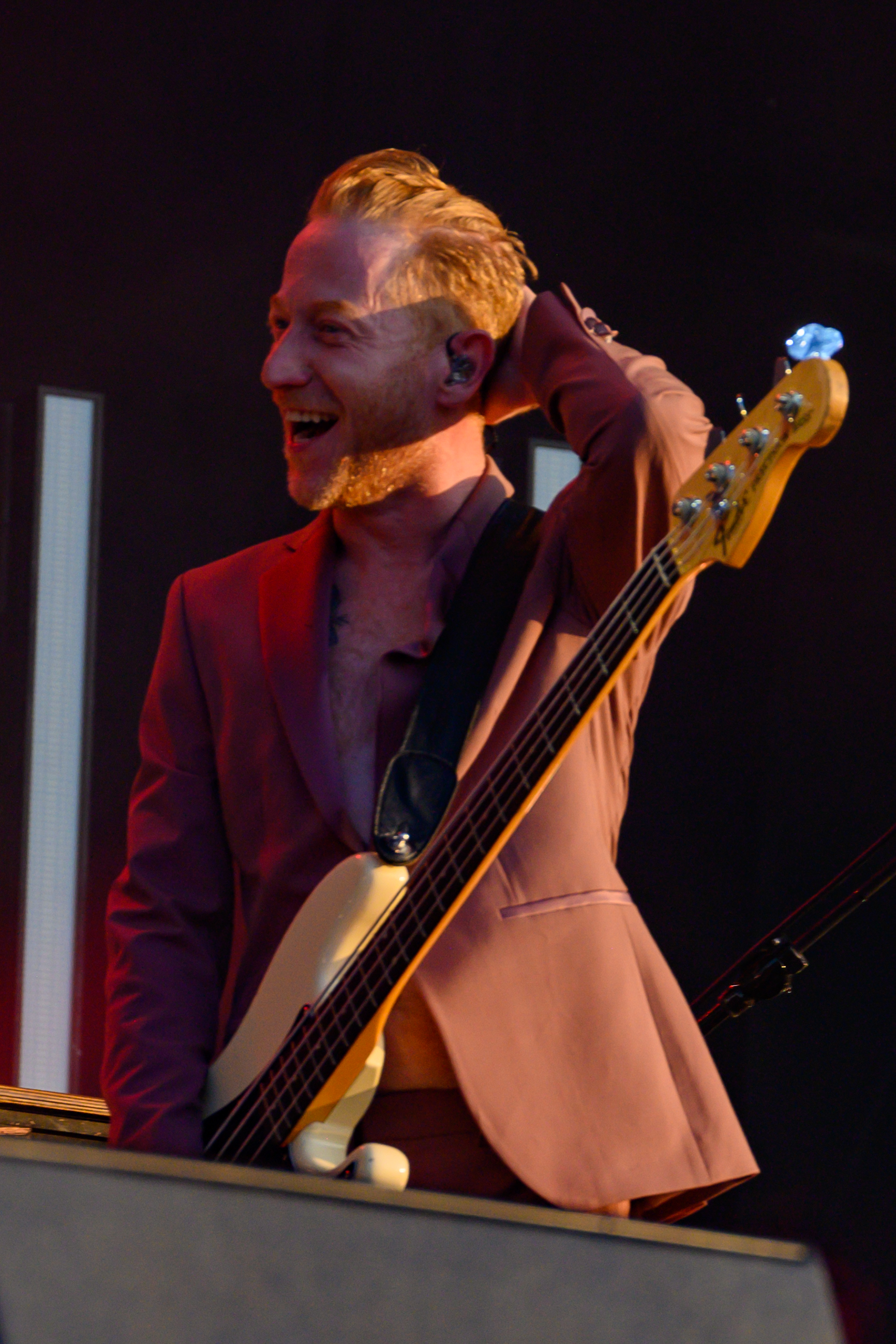
- Johnston with Biffy Clyro at Southside Festival 2025

Background information
- Born: James Robert Johnston; 25 April 1980 (age 46); Carmunnock, Glasgow, Scotland
- Origin: Kilmarnock, Ayrshire, Scotland
- Genres: Rock, alternative rock, progressive rock, nu prog, art rock
- Occupations: Musician, songwriter
- Instruments: Vocals, bass guitar, synth
- Years active: 1995–present
- Labels: Beggars Banquet, 14th Floor
- Member of: Biffy Clyro

James Robert Johnston (born 25 April 1980) is a Scottish bassist, vocalist, and songwriter for Scottish group Biffy Clyro.

== Early life ==
Johnston was born and raised in Carmunnock, Glasgow before the family moved to Kilmarnock, with his twin brother Ben (who became the drummer for Biffy Clyro), and his younger brother, Adam Johnston (who was Biffy Clyro's drum tech).

== Career ==
=== Biffy Clyro ===
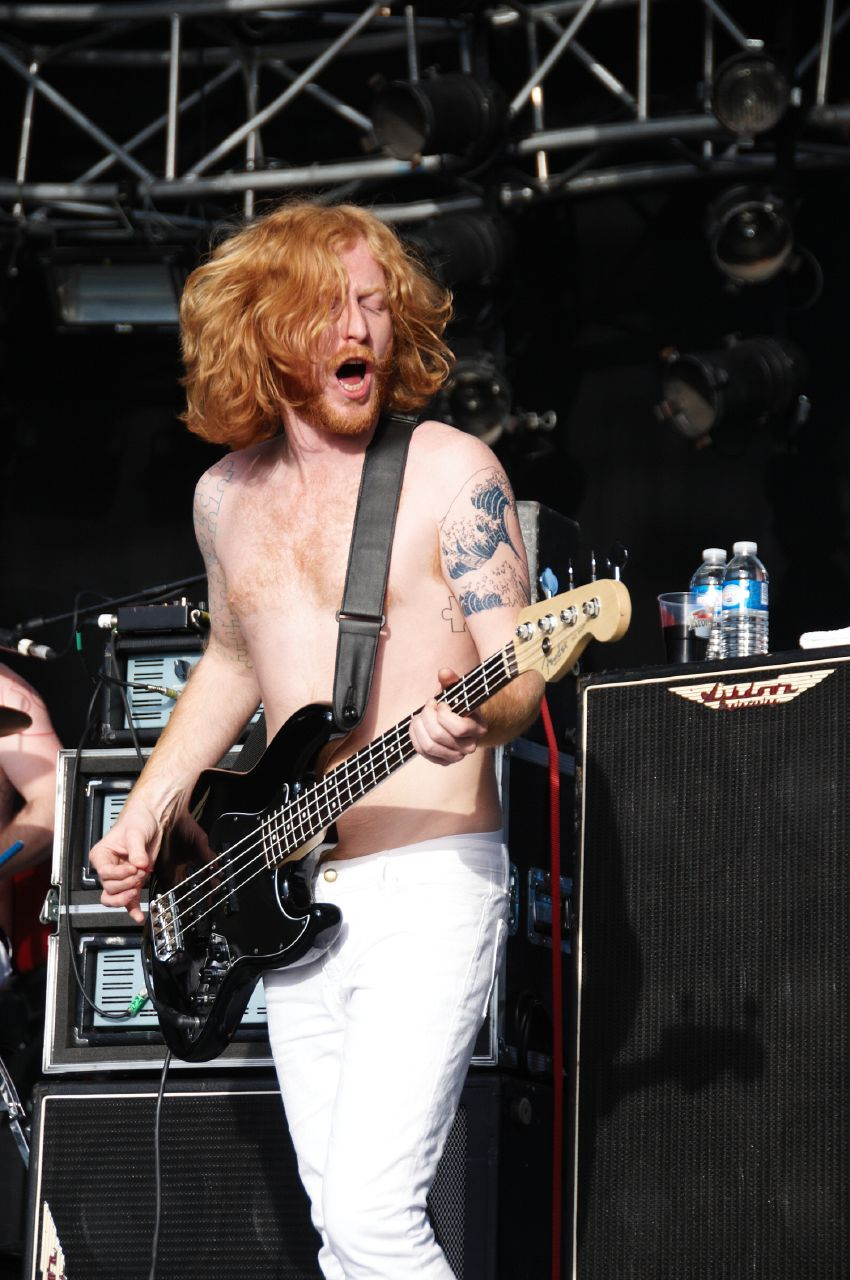
Johnston with Biffy Clyro at the Eurockéennes 2008

Having previously played bass with schoolfriend Simon Neil and brother Ben Johnston in a band called Skrewfish in 1995, the trio moved to Glasgow, and were discovered by manager Dee Bahl, and then signed to Beggars Banquet, in 2001.

=== Marmaduke Duke ===
Johnston plays bass guitar when the conceptual rock duo Marmaduke Duke plays live.

== Personal life ==
Johnston is fond of cycling, and cycles around the hills of Ayrshire.

On 15 December 2025, Johnston announced that he would be absent from Biffy Clyro's upcoming tours to seek treatment for addiction issues caused by mental health problems.

== Musical equipment used ==
The following is a list of musical equipment used by James Johnston.

=== Bass guitars ===
Johnston's basses are usually tuned to Biffy Clyro's preferred tuning of (DADG), but sometimes (BADG) for "Pause it and Turn It Up" and (CGCF) for "Living is a Problem Because Everything Dies", as well as "That Golden Rule", "The Captain" and "Got Wrong".

- Ashdown Engineering - Ashdown The Saint - Seen in his playthrough of "End Of" on YouTube
- Fender Jazz Bass – Lake Placid Blue USA model with upgraded pickups.
- Fender Jazz Bass – White USA model with tortoise shell plate.
- Fender Precision Bass
- Fender Jazz Bass - American Standard - Black and Sunburst
- Fender Precision Bass - American Standard - Olympic White
- Fender Jazz Bass - American Deluxe - Natural
- Ernie Ball MusicMan Stingray
- Rickenbacker 4003 - Mountains music video
- Squier Jazz Bass - Squier James Johnston Signature Jazz Bass - Lake Placid Blue
- Nik Huber Rietbergen Bass - Nik Huber Rietbergen Bass - Red
- Gibson Grabber - Black, used in some acoustic sessions
- Fender Jazz Bass - American Standard - Frost Metallic (Q-Awards Acoustic Set - Camden Jazz Cafe, London 2013)

=== Effects pedals ===
- Tech21 SansAmp Bass Driver DI Preamp
- BOSS LS-2 Line Selector
- BOSS ODB-3 Overdrive
- BOSS TU-2 Chromatic Tuner

=== Amplifiers ===
- Ashdown CTM-300 Head
- Ashdown ABM 900 Head
- Ashdown Classic Cabinets
- Eden World Tour WT550 Amplifier Head
- Eden WTDI Preamp Di box

=== Other ===
- 1.0mm bass pick

His tech is Dave White
