= Revolutions: Live at Wembley =

Live album by Biffy Clyro
- Released: 27 June 2011
- Venues: Wembley Arena, London
- Genre: Alternative rock
- Label: 14th Floor
- Producer: Garth "GGGarth" Richardson

Biffy Clyro chronology
Lonely Revolutions (2010)	Revolutions: Live at Wembley (2011)	Opposites (2013)

Revolutions: Live at Wembley is the first full-length live album by Scottish alternative rock band Biffy Clyro, released on 27 June 2011 on 14th Floor Records. The album was recorded live on 4 December 2010 at the Wembley Arena date of their UK tour.

== Track listing ==
=== CD/DVD ===
All lyrics are written by Simon Neil; all music is composed by Biffy Clyro.

No.	Title	Length
1.	"The Captain"	4:06
2.	"Booooom, Blast & Ruin"	3:21
3.	"57"	3:16
4.	"Bubbles"	5:07
5.	"Born on a Horse"	3:07
6.	"God and Satan"	3:09
7.	"Whorses"	4:05
8.	"All the Way Down: Prologue / Chapter 1"	6:34
9.	"That Golden Rule"	3:53
10.	"Living Is a Problem Because Everything Dies"	5:13
11.	"Shock Shock"	3:40
12.	"Folding Stars"	4:14
13.	"Diary of Always"	4:28
14.	"Machines"	4:01
15.	"Who's Got a Match?"	2:27
16.	"Saturday Superhouse"	3:24
17.	"Many of Horror"	5:20
18.	"Glitter and Trauma"	5:37
19.	"Mountains"	3:52

=== 2CD/DVD ===
All lyrics are written by Simon Neil; all music is composed by Biffy Clyro.

No.	Title	Length
1.	"The Captain"	4:06
2.	"Booooom, Blast & Ruin"	3:21
3.	"57"	3:16
4.	"Bubbles"	5:07
5.	"Born on a Horse"	3:07
6.	"God and Satan"	3:09
7.	"Whorses"	4:05
8.	"Joy.Discovery.Invention"	3:19
9.	"All the Way Down; Prologue Chapter 1"	6:34
10.	"That Golden Rule"	3:53
11.	"Living Is a Problem Because Everything Dies"	5:13
12.	"Shock Shock"	3:40
13.	"9/15ths"	3:06
14.	"Folding Stars"	4:14
15.	"Diary of Always"	4:28
16.	"Machines"	4:01
17.	"Who's Got a Match?"	2:27
18.	"Saturday Superhouse"	3:24
19.	"Know Your Quarry"	3:38
20.	"There's No Such Thing as a Jaggy Snake"	5:12
21.	"Many of Horror"	5:20
22.	"Glitter and Trauma"	5:07
23.	"Justboy"	4:26
24.	"As Dust Dances"	5:04
25.	"Mountains"	3:52

=== Editions ===
- A standard CD/DVD edition containing 19 tracks from the Wembley concert. Bonus features include band commentary of the show and a documentary titled Only Reflections, which was filmed at the 2010 T in the Park festival in Scotland.
- A 2CD/DVD edition featuring the full extended footage and audio of the Wembley concert. This is only available from the official Biffy Clyro website.
- A limited edition tinset. The tinset includes the 2CD/DVD version of the show with extended DVD footage, a programme from the 2010 UK arena tour, a double-sided A2 poster from the tour, limited edition stickers, confetti from the show and a piece of one of the band's smashed guitars (smashed in a residential street, not at the show).

== Personnel ==
- Simon Neil – vocals, lead guitar
- James Johnston – bass, vocals
- Ben Johnston – drums, vocals
- Mike Vennart – guitar

== Charts ==
Chart performance for Revolutions: Live at Wembley
Chart (2011)	Peak position
Scottish Albums (Official Charts)	4
UK Albums (Official Charts)	9
UK Rock & Metal Albums (Official Charts)	1
