= Opposites: Live from Glasgow =

Live album by Biffy Clyro
- Released: 29 November 2013
- Recorded: 1 April 2013 at the SECC, Glasgow.
- Genre: Alternative rock
- Length: 61:21
- Label: 14th Floor

Biffy Clyro chronology
Opposites (2013)	Opposites: Live from Glasgow (2013)	Similarities (2014)

Opposites: Live from Glasgow is the second full-length live album by Scottish alternative rock band Biffy Clyro, released on 29 November 2013 on 14th Floor Records. It was released exclusively in Germany, Austria, and Switzerland. It was recorded during their live performance at the Scottish Exhibition and Conference Centre, in Glasgow, Scotland on 1 April 2013, one of their concerts of the Opposites Tour.

The track list relies mostly on songs from their previous studio album Opposites, released in January 2013. Its artwork is also almost the same as that album, featuring a red sky instead of a blue one.

== Track listing ==
All lyrics are written by Simon Neil; all music is composed by Biffy Clyro

No.	Title	Length
1.	"Different People"	5:32
2.	"Sounds Like Balloons"	3:52
3.	"Black Chandelier"	3:54
4.	"Modern Magic Formula"	4:05
5.	"Opposite"	3:07
6.	"Living Is a Problem Because Everything Dies"	5:42
7.	"Victory Over the Sun"	4:19
8.	"Biblical"	4:17
9.	"Spanish Radio"	3:51
10.	"The Thaw"	4:14
11.	"The Joke's on Us"	3:54
12.	"Many of Horror"	4:53
13.	"Stingin' Belle"	5:06
14.	"Mountains"	3:56
