= Lonely Revolutions =

2010 compilation album by Biffy Clyro

Compilation album by Biffy Clyro
- Released: 23 August 2010
- Genres: Alternative rock; experimental rock
- Length: 55:27
- Label: 14th Floor
- Producers: Biffy Clyro, Garth "GGGarth" Richardson & Biffy Clyro "Paperfriend"

Biffy Clyro chronology
Only Revolutions (2009)	Lonely Revolutions (2010)	Revolutions: Live at Wembley (2011)

Lonely Revolutions is a compilation album by the Scottish band Biffy Clyro, originally released on 23 August 2010 and only available on 12" vinyl (limited to 300 pressings). The album features B-sides from the band's 5th album, Only Revolutions. The album was subsequently released on CD (limited to 1000 copies). In June 2014 the album was released digitally on Amazon, iTunes and Spotify worldwide.

== Track listing ==
All tracks are written by Simon Neil.

No.	Title	Length
1.	"Little Soldiers" (Mountains)	2:46
2.	"Paperfriend" (Mountains)	4:07
3.	"Robbery" (Mountains)	1:54
4.	"Prey Hey" (That Golden Rule)	3:14
5.	"Eyelids" (That Golden Rule)	3:32
6.	"Time Jazz" (That Golden Rule)	2:52
7.	"Help Me Be Captain" (The Captain)	4:55
8.	"Once An Empire..." (The Captain)	2:43
9.	"Party On" (The Captain)	3:06
10.	"Toottoottoot" (Many of Horror)	4:16
11.	"Lonely Revolutions" (Many of Horror)	2:32
12.	"Creative Burns" (Many of Horror)	2:33
13.	"Sad Sad Songs" (Bubbles)	2:54
14.	"Hiya" (Bubbles)	3:22
15.	"Street Love" (Bubbles)	2:48
16.	"Hawkwind" (God and Satan)	2:59
17.	"10 Bodies" (God and Satan)	2:23
18.	"51 Trumpets" (God and Satan)	2:44

== Credits ==
- Produced and recorded by Biffy Clyro, except 'Paperfriend' Produced by GGGGarth & Biffy Clyro
- Mixed by Mark Williams, except "Hawkwind", "Creative Burns" & "Lonely Revolutions" by Ben Kaplan and "Paperfriend" by Andy Wallace
- Mastered by Frank Arkwright & Howie Weinberg
- Design and photography Stormstudios
