= Similarities (album) =

Compilation album by Biffy Clyro
- Released: 18 July 2014
- Recorded: 2011–2012
- Studios: The Village; Santa Monica, California
- Genres: Alternative rock, experimental rock
- Length: 51:00
- Label: 14th Floor
- Producer: Biffy Clyro

Biffy Clyro chronology
Opposites: Live from Glasgow (2013)	Similarities (2014)	Ellipsis (2016)

Similarities is a compilation album by Scottish band Biffy Clyro, released in Germany on 18 July 2014, in the UK and Europe on 21 July, and in the US and Australia on 5 August. Available on 12" double vinyl, CD (Limited to 3,000 copies and exclusive to the Biffy Clyro webstore) and as a digital download.

The album features B-sides (and one previously unreleased track) from the band's sixth album, Opposites.

== Track listing ==
All tracks are written by Simon Neil.

No.	Title	Length
1.	"The Rain" (Black Chandelier)	2:21
2.	"Thundermonster" (Black Chandelier)	3:27
3.	"Milky" (Black Chandelier)	3:41
4.	"Fingerhut" (Biblical)	3:13
5.	"Watch" (Biblical)	4:01
6.	"Euphoria" (Biblical)	2:58
7.	"City of Dreadful Night" (Black Chandelier)	4:52
8.	"Sorry and Thanks" (Opposite)	3:07
9.	"A Tragic World Record" (Opposite)	3:31
10.	"Wooden Souvenir" (Opposite)	2:31
11.	"Feverish" (Opposite)	2:15
12.	"A Lonely Crowd" (Victory Over the Sun)	2:35
13.	"Fingers and Toes" (Victory Over the Sun)	3:02
14.	"No I'm Not Down" (Victory Over the Sun)	3:29
15.	"Break a Butterfly On a Wheel" (Victory Over the Sun)	2:58
16.	"Children's Limbs" (Previously Unreleased)	3:01

== Personnel ==
- Produced by: Biffy Clyro
- Mixed by: Ben Kaplan
- Mastered by: Frank Arkwright and Miles Showell at Abbey Road Studios
- Design and Photography by: Stormstudios

== Charts ==
Chart performance for Similarities
Chart (2014)	Peak position
Scottish Albums (Official Charts)	23
UK Albums (Official Charts)	28
UK Rock & Metal Albums (Official Charts)	1
