= Missing Pieces (Biffy Clyro album) =

Compilation album digital release by Biffy Clyro
- Released: 14 May 2009
- Genre: Alternative rock, experimental rock, post-hardcore
- Length: 65:13
- Label: 14th Floor

Biffy Clyro chronology
Singles 2001–2005 (2008)	Missing Pieces (2009)	Only Revolutions (2009)

Missing Pieces is a digital album by Scottish rock band Biffy Clyro, released 14 May 2009. The album features B-sides from singles released from the band's 4th album Puzzle.

== Overview ==
The album was released in digital format, initially only available in America. It was subsequently made available in the UK. The album compiles B-sides from the singles "Saturday Superhouse", "Living Is a Problem Because Everything Dies", "Folding Stars", "Machines" and "Who's Got A Match?", along with several demo tracks that were previously exclusive to iTunes UK.

== Track listing ==
All music is composed by Simon Neil.

No.	Title	Length
1.	"A Headline" (Folding Stars)	3:43
2.	"Coward" (Folding Stars)	3:42
3.	"I'm Behind You" (Saturday Superhouse)	2:34
4.	"Kittens, Cakes and Cuddles" (Living Is a Problem Because Everything Dies)	3:30
5.	"Loneliness" (Living Is a Problem Because Everything Dies)	2:33
6.	"Miracle of Survival" (Saturday Superhouse)	4:50
7.	"Relief or Fight" (Living Is a Problem Because Everything Dies)	4:11
8.	"Scared of Lots of Everything" (Saturday Superhouse)	3:54
9.	"Asexual Meat Kitchen" (Folding Stars)	3:31
10.	"Hermaphrofight" (Machines)	3:29
11.	"Cracker" (Who's Got A Match?)	2:33
12.	"But I'm Serious" (Who's Got A Match?)	3:41
13.	"Umbrella" (BBC Radio 1 Live Version, Who's Got A Match?)	2:57
14.	"Folding Stars" (Demo, Folding Stars)	4:30
15.	"Living Is a Problem Because Everything Dies" (Demo, Living Is a Problem Because Everything Dies)	5:14
16.	"Saturday Superhouse" (Acoustic Version, Saturday Superhouse)	3:22
17.	"Who's Got a Match?" (Demo, Who's Got A Match?)	2.25
18.	"Classical Machines" (Iain Cook Aereogramme Remix, Machines)	4:34

== Personnel ==
Biffy Clyro

- Simon Neil – vocals, guitar
- James Johnston – vocals, bass
- Ben Johnston – vocals, drums
- GGGarth Richardson – production
- Biffy Clyro – production
