= Who's Got a Match? =

- CD cover

Single by Biffy Clyro

from the album Puzzle
- B-side: "Umbrella" (BBC Radio 1 live version); "But I'm Serious"; "Cracker"
- Released: 4 February 2008
- Recorded: The Warehouse Studio (Vancouver, British Columbia); The Farm Studios (Gibsons, British Columbia)
- Genre: Alternative rock
- Length: 2:23
- Label: 14th Floor
- Songwriter: Simon Neil
- Producers: Garth Richardson; Biffy Clyro

Biffy Clyro singles chronology
"Machines" (2007)	"Who's Got a Match?" (2008)	"Mountains" (2008)

Puzzle track listing
- 1. "Living Is a Problem Because Everything Dies"; 2. "Saturday Superhouse"; 3. "Who's Got a Match?"; 4. "As Dust Dances"; "2/15ths" 5. "A Whole Child Ago"; 6. "The Conversation Is..."; 7. "Now I'm Everyone"; 8. "Semi-Mental"; "4/15ths" 9. "Love Has a Diameter"; 10. "Get Fucked Stud"; 11. "Folding Stars"; 12. "9/15ths" 13. "Machines"

"Who's Got a Match?" is a song by the Scottish band Biffy Clyro, from their 2007 album Puzzle. It was the sixth and final single from the album with a release date of 4 February 2008. It was BBC Radio 1 DJ Colin Murray's single of the week. It debuted at number 91 on the UK Singles Chart and rose to 60 the following week, finally reaching a peak of 27 after the CD and vinyl formats were released.

== Music video ==
The footage from this video was recorded during the UK Puzzle tour in November 2007. The opening clip is from Glasgow Barrowlands with the performance shots being taken from Brixton Academy, Norwich UEA and Southampton Guildhall.

== Track listings ==
Songs and lyrics by Simon Neil. Music by Biffy Clyro.

- CD 14FLR29CD
1. "Who's Got a Match?" – 2:23
2. "Umbrella" (BBC Radio 1 live version; Rihanna cover) – 2:58
- 7" #1 14FLR29V1
1. "Who's Got a Match?" – 2:23
2. "But I'm Serious"
- 7" #2 14FLR29V2
1. "Who's Got a Match?" – 2:23
2. "Cracker" – 2:28
- iTunes
1. "Who's Got a Match?" (demo version) – 2:25
