= Semi-Mental =

Single by Biffy Clyro

from the album Puzzle
- Released: 25 December 2006
- Recorded: The Warehouse Studio (Vancouver, British Columbia); The Farm Studios (Gibsons, British Columbia)
- Genre: Alternative metal
- Length: 4:09 (album version); 3:22 (single version)
- Label: 14th Floor
- Songwriter: Simon Neil
- Producer: Garth Richardson

Biffy Clyro singles chronology
"Only One Word Comes to Mind" (2005)	"Semi-Mental" (2006)	"Saturday Superhouse" (2007)

Puzzle track listing
- 1. "Living Is a Problem Because Everything Dies"; 2. "Saturday Superhouse"; 3. "Who's Got a Match?"; 4. "As Dust Dances"; "2/15ths" 5. "A Whole Child Ago"; 6. "The Conversation Is..."; 7. "Now I'm Everyone"; 8. "Semi-Mental"; "4/15ths" 9. "Love Has a Diameter"; 10. "Get Fucked Stud"; 11. "Folding Stars"; 12. "9/15ths" 13. "Machines"

"Semi-Mental" is a song by Biffy Clyro and the first single from their fourth album, Puzzle, and is a download only single. It was released on 25 December 2006. The song was not UK singles chart eligible as at the time, downloads only counted towards charts sales if there was a physical release.

== Overview ==
Simon Neil has commented on the song, saying

This is our most straight-up rock song. It's about trying to numb the pain when you're feeling so sad - when you hurt so much you need an escape. Everyone has a different way of escaping.

The song was also named single of the week by Kerrang! magazine. At the beginning of the music video, the words "Play Louder" are displayed. This is a reference to Audioslave's video for "Cochise", which displays the words "Play Loud" at the beginning

== Personnel ==
- Simon Neil – guitar, vocals
- James Johnston – bass, vocals
- Ben Johnston – drums, vocals
- Garth Richardson – producer
