= Mike Vennart =

English musician (born 1976)

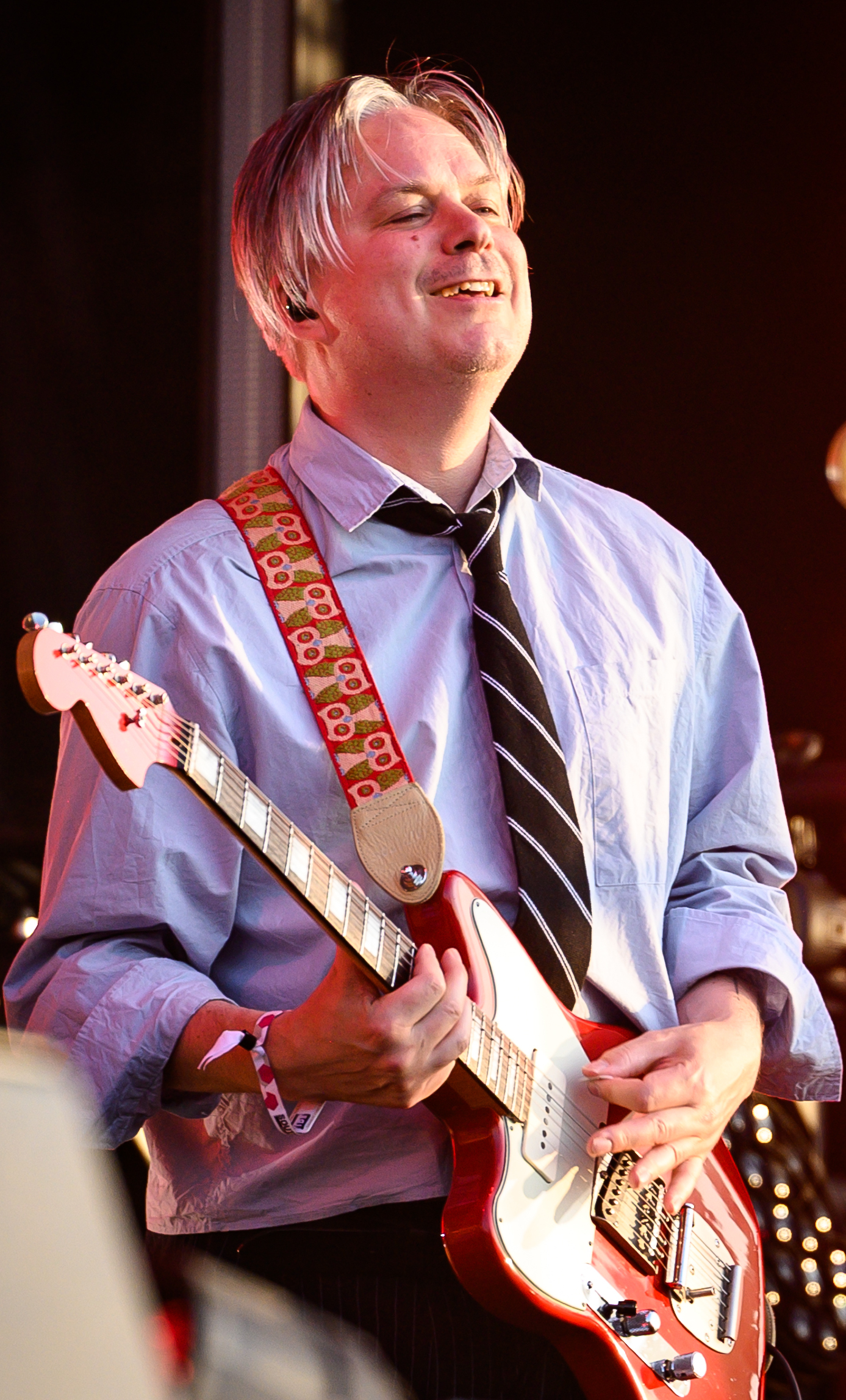
- Vennart with Biffy Clyro at Southside Festival 2025

Background information
- Also known as: Vennart
- Born: Michael James Vennart; 19 August 1976 (age 50); Methley, Yorkshire, England
- Genres: Alternative rock; art rock; experimental rock; extreme metal; progressive rock; post-rock
- Occupations: Musician; singer; songwriter
- Instruments: Vocals; guitar; bass guitar; keyboards; electronics
- Years active: 1998–present
- Label: Medium Format
- Member of: British Theatre; Empire State Bastard; Cardiacs
- Formerly of: Oceansize
- Website: vennart.com

Michael James Vennart (born 19 August 1976) is an English musician, best known as a guitarist and singer. The former frontman of Oceansize, he has been a touring guitarist for Biffy Clyro since 2010 and a member of British Theatre following Oceansize's breakup in 2011. He formed and leads the solo project Vennart, which has released four albums since 2015. He and Simon Neil debuted the grindcore band Empire State Bastard in 2023. In 2025, Vennart was announced as the lead singer of Cardiacs, after having recorded vocals for the long-unfinished album LSD (2025).

== Biography ==
=== Early years and influences ===
Michael James Vennart was brought up in the village of Methley, Yorkshire, England. Early musical influences included Cardiacs, Mogwai ("minimalism, maximalism, texture, simplicity and pure soul") and Pavement ("I never quite got over listening to Pavement. I keep waiting to grow out of it, but I get so much out of their music, and the strange thing is, it's actually incredibly simple, but Steve Malkmus’s guitar sounds are just incredible.") Others included Iron Maiden, Mr Bungle and Faith No More (whose Angel Dust he cited as "the album that hits you at age sixteen that will more than likely be there for you your whole life). For me, Angel Dust is that album. It seemed to come out of nowhere." Later influences included Silo and St. Vincent, the latter of whom "totally changed my mind about how pop really could be bent into any freaky shape you wanted it to be". He has described his initial style of guitar playing as coming from a "a real trained metal, prog-rock background", characteristics which he would mute in his early career in favour of a less virtuosic approach.

=== Oceansize ===
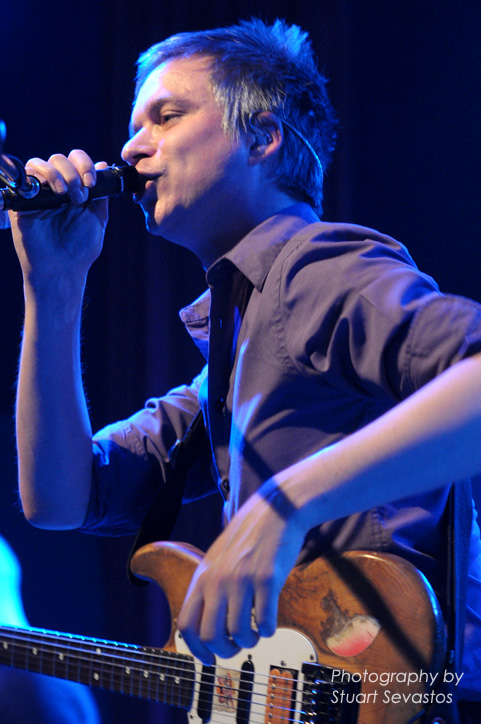
Vennart with Oceansize at Metropolis Fremantle in 2009

During the mid-1990s, Vennart attended the Popular Music course at the University of Salford, where he met the other members of Oceansize, forming the band in 1998 following a Mogwai concert. Vennart served as the band's frontman, spokesman and as one of its three guitarists.

Oceansize would go on to tour extensively and release four studio albums plus several EPs and singles, displaying a wide array of influences from several genres including post-rock, math rock, psychedelic rock and space rock. The band split up in February 2011.

=== Post-Oceansize, 2011–2014 – joining Biffy Clyro, plus British Theatre ===
While still with Oceansize, Vennart became a touring guitarist for Biffy Clyro in 2010. He has described himself as feeling "tremendously lucky" to be in the band, adding "I love all the people involved – the band are great, genuine guys. The crew are fucking ace fun, and most importantly, I enjoy playing the music every single night." Vennart remains in the Biffy Clyro live band to this day.

At around the same time, Vennart also reunited with Oceansize guitarist/keyboard player Gambler in the duo British Theatre. Conceived as a more experimental reaction against Oceansize's heavy rock aspects, British Theatre took a more psychedelic electronic approach, with far fewer guitars or clear guitar parts and more emphasis on keyboard synthesizers, extensive processing and glitch work while retaining Vennart's vocals. The project released two EPs in 2012, EP (2012) and Dyed in the Wool Ghost (2012), followed by a gap while both members toured with Biffy Clyro. Subsequent sessions and reworkings led to the release of a debut album, Mastery, in 2016, although no further work has followed.

=== The launching of Vennart: The Demon Joke and Target: '15 (Live At Bush Hall) (2015–2017) ===
Mike Vennart's solo career proper began in 2014 with the Bandcamp download-only single “Operate” on which he was joined by another former Oceansizer, Steve Durose. Vennart and DuRose would continue their re-engagement while Vennart toured with Biffy Clyro, with Vennart sending his initial ideas to Durose in order for piano and backing vocal ideas to be added. In 2015 the results were released under the project name "Vennart" via the album The Demon Joke, with a band consisting of Mike Vennart, Steve Durose and Gambler plus drummer Dean "Denzel" Pearson (Young Legionnaire, Mutation, Ginger Wildheart band).

In an interview with Total Guitar, Vennart confessed "I’d wanted to do something for years, even before the old band broke up – I’d had a hankering to do something a little more egocentric, I suppose, because Oceansize was very much a collaborative, painfully fucking democratic collective. It was a lot of fun in that respect: a very, very creative environment, but there were some things that were absolutely out of the question and certain guitar sounds that I liked – really horrible, fuzzy, broken-up Velcro shitty-sounding things. The Demon Joke’s an optimistic-sounding record in places, and I wouldn’t have gotten away with that in miserable old Oceansize. I got a lot more confident, as well; it wasn’t really prudent to be as virtuosic in Oceansize. I’m from a real trained metal, prog-rock background, and I wanted to fling a bit of that in, so there’s quite a lot of shredding in it, but it’s in a very, very ridiculous, shitty-sounding way."

In a separate interview with Prog magazine, Vennart described his trepidation about embarking on this project. “All the Oceansize stuff was written between us. So while I might have brought in ideas, they would get twisted and morphed and fucked about with by everyone. All those songs were written in a very collaborative process where we were all standing in the same room having each other’s ideas fuckin’ ripped apart. So I just didn't think I could do it. I didn't know how I'd do it. But I was lucky.”

The album was described by Prog magazine as "a madly inventive album that hints at Vennart’s arty, noisy American influences (think Faith No More, Slint and the like) while having a distinct personality of its own." In an accompanying review, Alex Lynham wrote "it would be an understatement to say that modern progressive rock fans have high expectations for this album. Some will be expecting a continuation of Oceansize; others, a more straightforward alternative rock album, or an electronic record... Well, The Demon Joke is at once all of these, and none of them... All considered, The Demon Joke is a stunning effort – youthful and vigorous and knowing and wry when it needs to be. Crucially, it fulfils that most pressing of expectations: Oceansize fans are going to love it."

For Drowned in Sound, Benjamin Bland noted "unlike a lot of Oceansize’s material, which despite the zany song titles was often all too easy to take ultra seriously, many of the songs on The Demon Joke are overflowing with a carefree joie de vivre that belies the obvious effort that went into the construction of each track. If it’s the accessibility of the songs gathered here that stands out on first listen then it’s likely to be the sheer invention on display... The Demon Joke is an utter joy of a record on several levels. Oceansize were a truly brilliant band, one whose genius will be better recognised in years to come than it ever was when they were still together. If this album is anything to go by, however, then Mike Vennart’s future solo endeavours are likely to prove just as worthy of such acclaim."

Despite singling out the effect of Oceansize's legacy on the album's music in his review for Spectral Nights, Ryan Barham also found reminders of Swans, Patrick Wolf, Clock Opera, King Crimson and Dutch Uncles, concluding that "with The Demon Joke, Vennart has created an album that not only recaptures the magic of Oceansize but also looks forward to something new and no less thrilling… All-encompassing and compelling throughout, it’s an album anyone with a passing interest in prog, math and rock will love. It’s been well worth waiting for…"

While fitting comparisons to New Order, The Blue Nile and Mew into his own review for The Progressive Aspect, Jez Rowden noted that "Vennart has said “I wanted to be experimental and unusual and still write pop songs", and so he has for a good number of years now and here he has put together a sparkling release, cunningly and lovingly crafted from relatively simple parts, the arrangements and dedication to intoxicating melodies building them into more than their individual face value might attest... There are no fiddly extended instrumental workouts, these are songs plain and simple, an album of short sharp shocks that benefits from the brevity to give expansiveness without undue length. Fans of Mike Vennart are sure to love this and hopefully there'll be a few more of those around after hearing this one."

=== To Cure a Blizzard Upon a Plastic Sea and Copeland (2018) ===
On 20 May 2018, the Vennart single "Donkey Kong" was released, trailing the release of a second Vennart album, To Cure a Blizzard Upon a Plastic Sea. The album was released on 14 September 2018, with a completely separate EP of other all-new material, Copeland, appearing the same day.

In Already Heard, Sam Seaton gave the album full marks, calling it "one of the most triumphant and impressive prog-rock albums of 2018" and Vennart "a talented and original songwriter undeserving of the past that some clutch on to so dearly... This is his best solo album yet, and possibly the best project he’s ever been a part of." Seaton suggested that Vennart's past career had provided the album with "the perfect storm of inspiration. From the first patient bass riffs of "Binary", you can feel the metered passion behind this album. It's richly layered, brooding with atmospheric drum beats and cosmic vocals. The attention to detail production-wise is beautiful, every moment of music on this album feels consistently carefully planned and it's satisfying... Even when things stray to new ideas they're pulled off brilliantly."

In Echoes & Dust, Michael Baker stated that the album "seeks to punch well above its weight class. Its a mini-goliath that refuses to be relegated to its size… less immediate than its predecessor, but given time it’s a far deeper and more rewarding listen – with plenty of trademark catchiness wrapped up in a weirdo rebellious spirit. (It) sounds huge; perhaps not ocean sized, but certainly a sizeable sea. Vennart and his collaborators have once again proven that they are an unpretentious rock force working with pretentious tools. It’s Iron Maiden for the Kafka crowd."

Baker added "taking a more expansive and progressive route then its predecessor The Demon Joke, songs are now flowing liquids ready to fill any space that it may find itself in...The whole works soars on a bedrock of twinkling synths and a buoyant guitar tone, trading in heavy riffs for more ephemeral hooks... The songs are long meandering beasts that are hard to pin down but, whether by nature or nurture, they are filled with reconfigured pop sensibilities that take you by the hand and guide you... To keep this light touch afloat means to sacrifice heaviness, and this means riffs are thrown overboard. Fortunately the album has a strong enough personality to succeed without them, but those with a soft spot for Vennart's heavier side may find themselves distinctly in the lurch."

Writing for The Soundboard Reviews, Luke Nuttall gave the album six marks out of ten and noted "the fact that To Cure a Blizzard Upon a Plastic Sea is ostensibly about maturing as a person while retaining brief hints of childhood wonder (which is why some of these track have titles like "Donkey Kong" and "Robots in Disguise") serves as a handy analogy for the album itself, one whose focus ends up at smoother, less noteworthy passages with a sense of real excitement only showing up in short bursts. That unfortunately means that To Cure a Blizzard... doesn't hit all the marks it really needs to, but that's not a case of not trying... The likes of "Binary" and "That's Not Entertainment" are deeply entrenched in the softer ‘70s style of prog, but with the borderline Britpop tones of "Friends Don't Owe" or "Sentientia"s big, theatrical strokes condensed into the album’s most immediate hit, the effort to make this a more diverse listen is definitely appreciated."

Nuttall also commented that "it’s telling that the best moments are when Vennart’s clear talent are confined to tighter boundaries like on "Sentientia", or when there's a bit more intensity in his delivery like on "Diamond Ballgag". Even amidst the constantly shifting sounds, very few actually stick in the long run, and it leaves the overall longevity of this hour-long album as something to be desired... that deeper level of depth isn't really there, and To Cure a Blizzard... can be a rather hollow listen because of it. That's not a slight on Vennart's skills as an artist either – even here he shows his talents off in an excellent light – but they probably need repurposing in some fashion to get the most out of them."

=== Run-ins, "Dick Privilege" and In the Dead, Dead Wood (2019–2021) ===
In December 2018, Mike Vennart had a run-in with British right-wing political activist Tommy Robinson, earning him the enmity of the British far-right and a consequent campaign of harassment by them. This eventually led to the recording of a stand-alone Vennart single, "Dick Privilege", inspired by the events and pressed on "gammon-coloured vinyl" for release in March 2020.

"A while back, I found myself incurring the wrath of the far right, after I’d clumsily whacked their squalid little hive. Having encountered their diminutive Queen Bee and, being of not-entirely-sound mind, I called him a Nazi to his face, and he proceeded to give me more press than I’d ever had in my life. Unfortunately what came with that was thousands of threats of physical and sexual violence – via social media – to my wife and my mother, and death threats to myself. They threatened to burn down my house. They continued in earnest on Christmas Day and through into the New Year. They sent me pictures of my son and told me they were coming. All because I called a man – a man they’d never met – a Nazi. The experience of being hunted by white supremacists was, for me, exciting and hilarious. They bark hard, but they don't bite. Well, I guess I’m not such a useful idiot. I’m not actually worth murdering. So it was great fun for me. Less so for my then-six-year-old son, who wept with terror as the police fire-proofed our house the day before Christmas Eve. All of this is, obviously, symptomatic of a darker force at work."

— Mike Vennart on his harassment by fascists in 2019

Stepping temporarily away from band work, Mike Vennart then joined forces with Rob Crow and Kavus Torabi to record two Iron Maiden covers, "Losfer Words (Big 'Orra)" and "Mission From 'Arry" – for Joyful Noise Recordings. These were released on Bandcamp on 19 June 2020 as part of the 3 EPs To Benefit Black Lives Matter package.

The third Vennart album, In the Dead, Dead Wood, was released without any previous announcements or publicity on 6 November 2020. In the publicity material, Mike Vennart commented "this album was written quickly during lockdown, and features an altered line up from our usual outings. Joe Lazarus is on drums, Charlie Barnes contributed the exquisite piano parts, and Ben Griffiths of Alpha Male Tea Party added some massive bass to three tracks. Elsewhere my omnipresent partners Gambler and Steve Durose played keys and mixed the record respectively."

A video for album track "Super Sleuth" arrived on the same day. Sputnikmusic described the song as "a chunky swing-rocker that alternates between goofiness and grit with palpable confidence. It’s easy to imagine a range of aspirant post-Mars Volta progheads eyeing up the song’s transition from a camp piano bridge to a crushing tail-end as something they could potentially make their own, but there’s an uncommon sense of conviction in the sequences of distortion that briskly transform the track’s latter end from charming to chilling. These shifts in tone aren’t prog gimmickry; they’re formidable songwriting from a steady performer, and if Vennart rounds it off with the most savage screams he’s belted out in quite some time, all the more kudos to him."

Writing in The Progressive Review, Jez Rowden joyfully greeted In the Dead, Dead Wood with "what a fucking album this is... this is skilfully crafted stuff, full of excellent diversions that both cast your mind back to Vennart’s former band and also project it forward to a tinsel and glitter future of wonderfulness... The cohesion and sheer heft undoubtedly produce Vennart’s finest solo work to date, deftly covering a lot of ground to provide an experience both visceral and intoxicatingly beautiful... Alternative sounds, metal scope, mathy intensity and psychedelic bursts of colour are moulded into something mature and masterful, dripping with melody and gut-punch heaviosity. My boat is completely floated, it's a long time overdue for this man's talents to be more widely recognised."

In its full review of In the Dead, Dead Wood – while delivering a 4.0 ("excellent") rating – Sputnikmusic labelled the album "a thunderous surprise hit" with "startling knockout value... eight swanky new songs, a slick production job, and the most energised performance the man has dished out in years... What strikes me most about In The Dead, Dead Wood is the way it explores Vennart’s strong suits one at a time... we hear him as a graduate of Iommi College of Ominous Riffage (“Mourning on the Range"); as a sensitive purveyor of Mogwai-esque rainy day post-rock ("Forc in the Road"); as a roof-raising Biffy Clyro affiliate ("Elemental"); and – of course – as a left-of-field Cardiacs fanatic ("Super Sleuth"). It's easy to reduce In the Dead, Dead Wood to a comprehensive charting of the many things Mike Vennart does well, but I can't overstate how much of a treat it is to hear him sounding so revitalised... Somewhere in Manchester, Vennart is probably enjoying a well-earned wry grin right now; he knows he's still got it.”

=== Ongoing work (2022–present) ===
In February 2022, Vennart released CGI Metals OST, a belated companion album to To Cure a Blizzard Upon a Plastic Sea, featuring the same Vennart/DuRose/Gamber/Denzel line-up.

In October 2022 Vennart temporarily reverted to releasing material as "Mike Vennart" for the first time in eight years when he released Backseat Hards, an album of guitar and laptop instrumentals which he had recorded on his own in tour buses while on tour with Biffy Clyro.

On 2 February 2024, the fourth Vennart studio album – Forgiveness & the Grain – was released, performed by Mike Vennart and Joe Lazarus with a couple of piano contributions from Gambler. Reviewing the album in Sputnikmusic (in which he gave a 4.0 "excellent" rating), Raul Stanciu said "2020’s In the Dead, Dead Wood was quite an achievement, pushing into darker, more personal territory. The man decided this was worth further exploring, so Forgiveness & the Grain takes a few more steps down the same path. There is controlled chaos and a hazy atmosphere about it that draws you in right away. Music-wise, we receive bits of everything he has composed so far, going from softer post-rock to explosive pieces… The way Vennart toys with less conventional approaches to the songs’ structures maintains an element of surprise. Also, for the most part, he avoids classic distorted guitar chords, enhancing instead the heaviness of the bass and drums in order to fill the spaces where usually those would soar up front. This provides the record a slightly different and rather fresh sound. In other words, the man can do no wrong and Forgiveness & the Grain is another excellent addition to his solo career."

Stanciu also drew comparisons to Boris and Deerhunter, and commented on "(the) slightly uncanny, volatile feeling all the tracks transmit."

=== Empire State Bastard (2023–present) ===
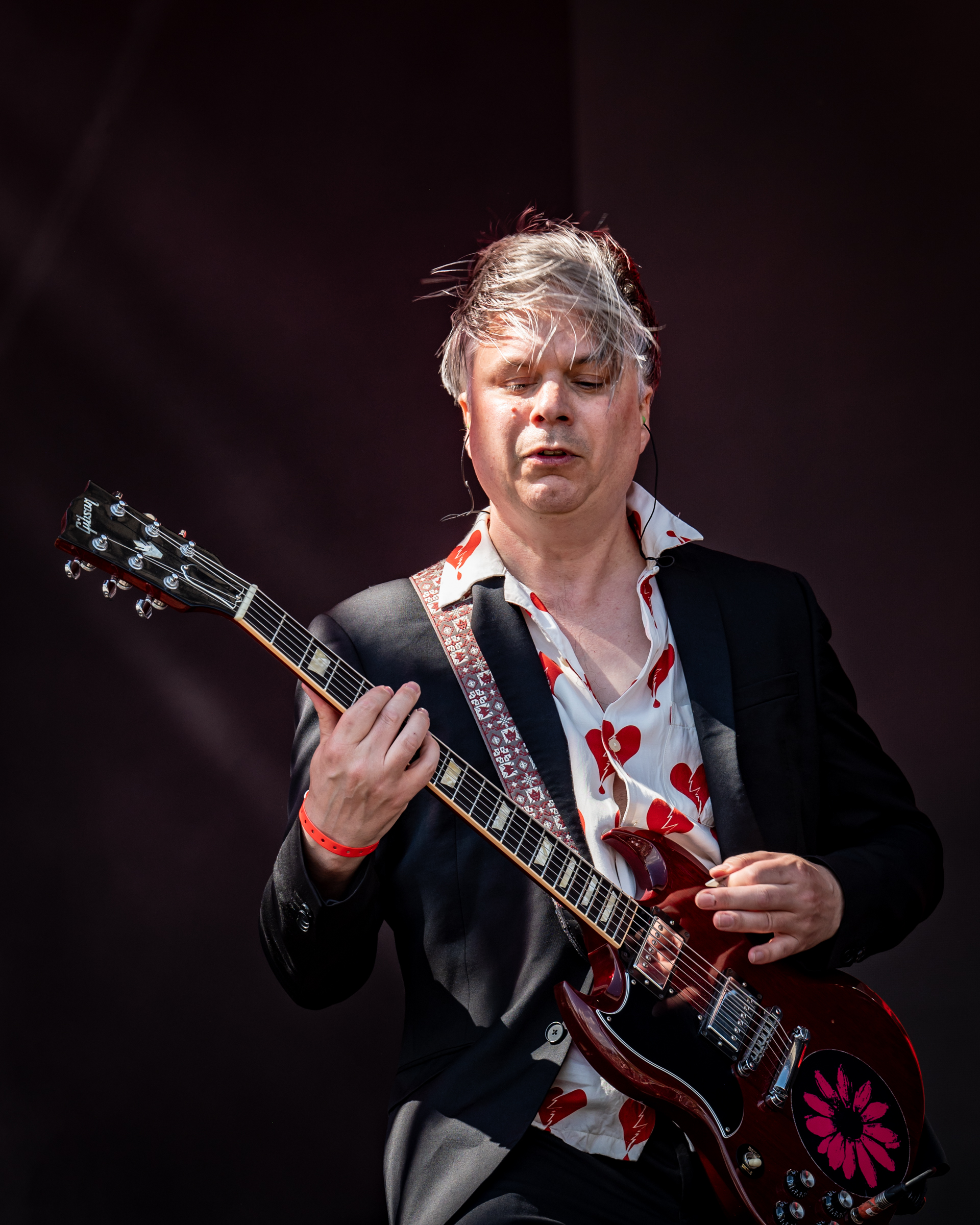
Vennart with Empire State Bastard at Tons of Rock 2024

In 2023, Vennart formed the extreme metal band Empire State Bastard alongside Biffy Clyro singer/guitarist Simon Neil and former Slayer drummer Dave Lombardo. Their first album, Rivers of Heresy, was released in September 2023.

=== Cardiacs (2024–present) ===
As a longstanding fan and friend of Cardiacs, Vennart was recruited to sing lead vocals on the band's LSD album during sessions in 2024 and 2025, following the 2020 death of former group leader/frontman Tim Smith. Shortly before the release of LSD in September 2025, Vennart was confirmed as being the band's new lead singer for current and possible future projects.

== Equipment ==
Although he has used other guitars (including the Fender Jazzmaster and the Gibson SG), Mike Vennart favours the Squier Stratocaster "pretty much all the way... I’ve had (it) since I was eleven, and the only original thing is the wood. Everything else has been changed: the frets, the tuners, the pickups – fucking everything. And I keep retiring it, because something devastatingly scary will happen, where that guitar is going to perish. It’s happened a few times: we played in India, or rather, we didn’t play in India because Metallica cancelled the fucking show at the last minute – just as we were about to go on stage, the show got cancelled, literally – and fucking 50,000 people that were there just went absolutely apeshit and burned the place to the fucking ground. And I was being driven out, just petrified that my guitar was gonna get burned. “Biffy were like, ‘Well, you know, we’ve got insurance. We’ll buy more gear.’ I was like, ‘That guitar – I don’t have any other bit of gear where I’m like, ‘Without that, I’m nothing.’’...”

An overview of Vennart's pedalboard in 2015 revealed a Death By Audio Echo Dream 2 for delay (backed up with Boss DD-3 and DD-7 pedals); an Electro-Harmonix POG 2 polyphonic octave generator; a Danelectro Fab Tone (“for when I just want to kill everyone"); a Dwarfcraft Shiva Fuzz ("real volatile, horrible; it’s not nice"); an Electro-Harmonix Pitch Fork (replacing a DigiTech Digital Whammy); and three units by Green Carrot Pedals – a Cornstar distortion pedal, a Dirty Radish boost and overdrive, and an Infatuator. The last of these was a custom pedal created for Vennart by GCP and subsequently brought out as a limited-edition signature range. According to Vennart, "you’ve got the Big Cheese on one side with four different settings of fuzz. I use that a lot for broken-up, Velcro-y shitty- sounding stuff. And then the other side is the IC Big Muff; it’s got a switch on it that takes the tone control out so it just gets more woolly but really, really fat." His amplifier choices are Matamp and Orange.

== Personal life ==
Vennart was diagnosed with autism in 2024. He also has attention deficit hyperactivity disorder.

== Discography ==
=== Vennart ===
- "Operate" single (self-released, 2014) (as Mike Vennart)
- The Demon Joke (Medium Format, 2015)
- Target: '15 (Live At Bush Hall) (Medium Format, 2017/2018, DVD, CD, download)
- “Donkey Kong” single (self-released, 2018)
- To Cure a Blizzard Upon a Plastic Sea (Medium Format, 2018)
- Copeland EP (self-released, 2018)
- "Dick Privilege" single (self-released, 2020)
- In the Dead, Dead Wood (self-released, 2020)
- CGI Metals OST (self-released, 2022)
- Backseat Hards EP (self-released, 2022) (as Mike Vennart)
- Forgiveness & The Grain (self-released, 2024)
- "The Familiar" single (self-released, 2025)
- 4 Post-Rock Wank-Offs For Cash EP (self-released, 2025) (as Mike Vennart)

=== British Theatre ===
- EP EP (self-released, 2012)
- Dyed in the Wool Ghost EP (Medium Format, 2012)
- "Cross the Swords" single (self-released, 2015)
- Mastery (self-released, 2016)

=== Empire State Bastard ===
- "Harvest" single (Roadrunner Records, 2023)
- Rivers of Heresy (Roadrunner Records, 2023)
- Silver Cord Sessions EP (Roadrunner Records, 2024)

=== Cardiacs ===
- LSD (Alphabet Business Concern, 2025)

=== Other ===
- Rob Crow + Kavus Torabi + Mike Vennart – "Losfer Words (Big 'Orra)/Mission From 'Arry" (Joyful Noise Recordings, 2020 – part of the 3 EPs to Benefit Black Lives Matter package)

=== Guest appearances ===
- Amplifier - Amplifier (Music for Nations, 2004) (backing vocals on "Panzer" and "UFOs")
- Rose Kemp - Unholy Majesty (Aurora Borealis, 2008) (vocoder vocals on "The Unholy")
- Amplifier - The Octopus (self-released, 2011) (backing vocals)
- Biffy Clyro - Revolutions: Live at Wembley (14th Floor, 2011) (guitar)
- Biffy Clyro - Opposites (14th Floor, 2013) (additional guitar, additional vocals)
- Biffy Clyro - Opposites: Live from Glasgow (14th Floor, 2013) (additional musician)
- Biffy Clyro - MTV Unplugged: Live at Roundhouse, London (14th Floor, 2018) (additional guitar)
- KK's Priest - Sermons of the Sinner (EX1, 2021) (backing vocals)
- Biffy Clyro - A Celebration of Endings: Live from the Barrowlands Ballroom (14th Floor, 2022) (guitar, backing vocals)
- Sugar Horse - Waterloo Teeth (Small Pond, 2022) (guitar on "Super Army Soldiers")
- Kugelschreiber - Cheerleaders (self-released, 2024) ('aerobatics' and slide guitar on "No Glittering Promises", 'additional stereo hots')
- Biffy Clyro - Futique (Warner, 2025) (additional guitar on "Goodbye" and "Dearest Amygdala")
- Spratleys - Bloom (ATE MUSIC, 2026) (chorus on "Jade" and "Gold Place")
