= Machines (Biffy Clyro song) =

- Machines Download / 7" #1 Cover

Single by Biffy Clyro

from the album Puzzle
- B-side: "Hermaphrofight"; "Classical Machines"; "Machines" (demo); "Machines" (rock version)
- Released: 8 October 2007
- Recorded: The Warehouse Studio (Vancouver, British Columbia); The Farm Studios (Gibsons, British Columbia)
- Genre: Acoustic rock
- Length: 3:56 (album version); 3:38 (single version); 3:28 (rock version)
- Label: 14th Floor
- Songwriter: Simon Neil
- Producers: Garth Richardson; Biffy Clyro

Biffy Clyro singles chronology
| "Folding Stars" (2007) | "Machines" (2007) | "Who's Got a Match?" (2008) |

Puzzle track listing
- 1. "Living Is a Problem Because Everything Dies"; 2. "Saturday Superhouse"; 3. "Who's Got a Match?"; 4. "As Dust Dances"; "2/15ths" 5. "A Whole Child Ago"; 6. "The Conversation Is..."; 7. "Now I'm Everyone"; 8. "Semi-Mental"; "4/15ths" 9. "Love Has a Diameter"; 10. "Get Fucked Stud"; 11. "Folding Stars"; 12. "9/15ths" 13. "Machines"

"Machines" is a song by Scottish band Biffy Clyro, from their 2007 album, Puzzle. It was due to be released as the fourth physical single from Puzzle on 1 October 2007 but was pushed back one week and released on 8 October 2007.

== Overview ==
Simon Neil has commented on the song, saying:

This is an acoustic song we recorded on the last day in the studio. I wanted the album to end on a positive vibe. No matter what you go through there's always hope. You can make yourself happy.

== Composition ==
There are three different versions: the album version features a stripped-down sound, consisting of solely acoustic guitar, glockenspiel, light percussion and cello. The "Alternate Mix" was released on iTunes on 30 September and features a full band sound with bass and drums. The "Rock Version" can only be bought at Recordstore.co.uk and also has alternate lyrics to the album version.

== Track listings ==
Songs and lyrics by Simon Neil. Music by Biffy Clyro.

- CD 14FLR44CD, 5051442406672
1. "Machines" (Chris Lord-Alge mix) – 3:54
2. "Hermaphrofight"
- 7" #1 14FLR27V1, 5051442406672
1. "Machines" (Chris Lord-Alge mix) – 3:54
2. "Classical Machines" (remix)
- 7" #2 14FLR27V2, 5051442406672
1. "Machines" (Chris Lord-Alge mix) – 3:54
2. "Machines" (demo)
- Digital download – Recordstore.co.uk exclusive
1. "Rock Machines"

== Personnel ==
- Simon Neil – lead vocals, acoustic guitar, glockenspiel
- James Johnston – backing vocals; bass (alternate and rock versions only)
- Ben Johnston – backing vocals, percussion; drums (alternate and rock versions only)
- Garth Richardson – producer
- Dorothy Lawson – cello
- Iain Cook – "Classical Machines" remixer
- Chris Lord-Alge – "Machines" (alternative version) mixer

== Chart performance ==
| Chart (2007) | Peak position |
|---|---|
| UK Singles Chart | 29 |
