= Only Revolutions (album) =

Studio album by Biffy Clyro
- Released: 9 November 2009
- Recorded: 2008–2009
- Studios: Ocean Way Recording (Hollywood, California)
- Genre: Alternative rock
- Length: 42:49
- Label: 14th Floor
- Producer: Garth "GGGarth" Richardson

Biffy Clyro chronology
Missing Pieces (2009)	Only Revolutions (2009)	Lonely Revolutions (2010)

Singles from Only Revolutions
- 1. "Mountains" Released: 18 August 2008; 2. "That Golden Rule" Released: 23 August 2009; 3. "The Captain" Released: 26 October 2009; 4. "Many of Horror" Released: 18 January 2010; 5. "Bubbles" Released: 2 May 2010; 6. "God & Satan" Released: 23 August 2010

Only Revolutions is the fifth studio album by Scottish alternative rock band Biffy Clyro, released 9 November 2009 on 14th Floor Records. As with its predecessor, Puzzle, the album was produced by Garth Richardson.

Upon release, Only Revolutions was a critical and commercial success. The album entered at No. 8 on the UK Album Chart and was then certified gold by the BPI shortly afterwards. It was certified platinum by the BPI in June 2010 for shipments of 300,000 copies in the UK, making it the band's largest-selling album. In September 2010, the album achieved a new peak position of No. 3. It was the 26th biggest-selling album of 2010 in the UK with sales of 377,900.

It was nominated for the 2010 Mercury Prize, which is awarded annually for the best album in the UK or Ireland, and Rock Sound declared it third in its list of the 75 best albums of 2009.

== Overview ==
In an interview with NME in September 2008, lead singer Simon Neil confirmed that work had begun on a followup to Puzzle, the new material containing some of the band's "heaviest riffs to date", while also introducing keyboards, suggesting some experimentation. The first preview of the album came the following November, the band debuting the song "God & Satan" while playing an acoustic gig at London's Union Chapel. In a March 2009 Kerrang! magazine article, it was stated that they planned to enter the studio and begin recording in April 2009. The same Kerrang! article revealed a working title for the upcoming album – Boom, Blast and Ruin. Although this title was eventually scrapped, it was revealed that a song of the same name would appear on the album.

The final title for the album was officially announced as Only Revolutions after Mark Z. Danielewski's 2006 novel. Bassist James Johnston notes:

It's a really interesting book. [...] The nice thing is that it's a story told from two points of view and Simon got married last year and I think it's a love record in that regard, it's about his relationship with his new wife. A lot of it is about trying to take arguments from somebody else['s] point of view and be able to see two sides of the picture. I guess a lot of it is about the revolutions in life and revolutions in relationships and those sort of things, just the stuff everyone goes through at different points in their life.

"That Golden Rule" was confirmed as the second single from the album, after receiving its first play from an ecstatic Zane Lowe during his Radio 1 show on 8 July. The single was released on 23 August 2009.

It was subsequently confirmed that the album would also include the band's 2008 hit single "Mountains", which had not previously been included on any of the band's studio albums (and had at the time of its release been considered a "non-album single").

Kerrang! ran an interview in the 25 August edition informing the album would have 12 tracks and that David Campbell was providing orchestrations to six of those tracks. The article also validated the rumours that Josh Homme would make a guest appearance on the album, contributing a guitar solo to the track "Bubbles". "The Captain" received its first play during Zane Lowe's Radio 1 show on 8 September and it was then confirmed that the single would be released on 26 October.

The band confirmed on 26 November 2009 through their website that "Many of Horror" would be the fourth single and would be released on 18 January 2010. It had been Fearne Cotton's record of the week on her Radio 1 weekday show.

The next single to be released was "Bubbles" on 3 May. The song reached a peak position of No. 34 on the UK Singles Chart, making it the band's fifth consecutive single to reach the top forty.

On 23 August the same year, the band released "God and Satan" as their next single. Like "Many of Horror", "God and Satan" received a single mix and further B-sides. On the same day, the band released a compilation album of all B-sides released during Only Revolutions called Lonely Revolutions, much akin to Missing Pieces. Originally, the album was released as a limited pressing of 300 copies on 12" vinyl but later released a limited number of 1000 CDs.

"Many of Horror", renamed "When We Collide", was chosen as The X Factor finalist's song for Matt Cardle, and was released on 13 December with the aim of becoming the UK's Christmas Number 1 record for 2010.

== Artwork ==
The sleeve's designer Storm Thorgerson said: "In thinking that the music was strong-minded yet lyrical persuaded us to think of material flapping in the wind like flags – the flags of a revolution. Not little flags or small bits of fabric, but enormous flags the size of a modest office block, which we affixed to a scaffold tower on the top of a hill on a windy day. The sound of the undulating material was affecting, let alone the bizarre shapes. The actual cover used red and blue flags to represent the sexes."

The picture is indebted to another of Thorgerson's works: the sleeve and video for Pink Floyd's "High Hopes".

== Critical reception ==
Professional ratings
Aggregate scores
Source	Rating
Metacritic	76/100
Review scores
Source	Rating
AllMusic	4.5/5 stars
Clash	(7/10)
Drowned in Sound	(8/10)
The Fly	4/5 stars
Gigwise	4/5 stars
The Guardian	4/5 stars
Kerrang!	4/5 stars
NME	(8/10)
Q	4/5 stars
Rock Sound	(9/10)

Only Revolutions was met with positive reviews; Metacritic reports an aggregated score of 76, based on eight professional reviews.

- Nick Annan of Clash magazine was favourable in his review and awarded a score of 7/10. He summarised; "QOTSA's Josh Homme contributes a guitar solo on 'Bubbles' and while Top five hit 'Mountains' is still the best example here of the band in full majestic flow, there are plenty of big chorus to be enjoyed elsewhere here. Contrary to the album's title, for Biffy Clyro evolution proves more useful than revolution".
- Drowned in Sound writer Thom Gibbs praised the bands earnestness, despite describing the sound as more commercially accessible; "Biffy Clyro’s Simon Neil is emphatically unbothered about offending the anti-earnest on his band’s fifth album. Only Revolutions is a massive, bold and ambitious record, primed for radio but loaded with the unshakeable seriousness and belief that has run through Biffy’s career". He was less favourable towards the lyrics, particularly in slower songs such as 'God & Satan' and 'Many of Horror', but ultimately awarded a score of 8/10. He added, "Grandeur suits Biffy Clyro, and their overblown songs manage to tug effectively on heartstrings despite their foibles. Their vibrant brand of ridiculousness is infinitely preferable to the mass emotional prescriptions of Snow Patrol or vapid truisms of Coldplay".
- Matt Glass, journalist for Scottish publication The Fly, gave a positive review with a 4/5 star rating. He did say however, that the album wasn't completely cohesive throughout; "Each track is undoubtedly great, but, as an album, Only Revolutions sometimes struggles to flow through Biffy’s scatterbomb of styles". That was that the only criticism though as he summed up his review with, "With Only Revolutions, Biffy cast a magnifying glass over everything they showcased on Puzzle. The riffs get louder, the screams more pertinent and the orchestral onslaughts darker and more sinister. 'Mon the Biffy..."
- Chris Reynolds of Gigwise also awarded the album a four star rating. He summarised, "Simply put Only Revolutions maintains predictability and unpredictability in equal measure. It’s a step forward, a step up and a genuinely brilliant rock album, bring on the amphitheatres".
- The Guardian writer Sarah Boden, complimented the band for "confidently casting their net wider" than predecessor Puzzle. She went on to add that "Biffy Clyro have got this far without paying heed to populist tastes, so they needn't start now. Still, it's a woeful soul who can listen to Only Revolutions without feeling exhilarated and part of the gang".
- NME gave a very positive review, awarding a score of 8/10. Jamie Fullerton wrote that the album "springs the band instantly level with the greatest rock acts in the world. The only thing that can stop them being recognised as such is the 2010 trend of UK guitar music being treated with contempt by the electro-pop-fixated mainstream".
- Rock Sound were also highly favourable, scoring the album at 9/10. Tim Newbound wrote that, "Only Revolutions perfectly juxtaposes moods; beautifully serene songs such as 'God & Satan', 'Know Your Quarry' and 'Many of Horror', for example, provide an ebb and flow that balances delicacy with the balls-out aggression of 'Cloud of Stink' and the ace closer that is 'Whorses', a song in which they achieve a dark melodic sensibility that betters anything featured on one of Neil's favourite records, Weezer's Pinkerton".
- Mark Edwards of The Sunday Times gave the album a four star review. He praised the record for holding a "highly listenable variant". He also wrote that, "On Only Revolutions they move things up a gear with a string of actual and potential hits ('That Golden Rule', 'Mountains' and the stadium-ready 'The Captain' have already charted; the Josh Homme-featuring 'Bubbles' surely will). But the rubbery oddness of 'Born on a Horse' reassures us that the band haven’t lost their quirky imagination".
- Further positive reviews came from British publications, Kerrang! and Q, who both rated the album at four stars. Q magazine also named the album one of the 50 best records of 2009 and the song "Bubbles" as no 2 in its top 50 downloads of November.

=== Accolades ===
Publication	Country	Accolade	Year	Rank
Rock Sound	UK	Top Seventy Five Albums of the Year	2009	3
Q	UK	Top Fifty Albums of the Year	2009	30
Kerrang	UK	K Critics Albums of 2009	2009	3

== Track listing ==
All tracks are written by Simon Neil.

No.	Title	Length
1.	"The Captain"	3:43
2.	"That Golden Rule"	3:49
3.	"Bubbles"	5:01
4.	"God & Satan"	3:09
5.	"Born on a Horse"	2:49
6.	"Mountains"	3:21
7.	"Shock Shock"	3:03
8.	"Many of Horror"	4:18
9.	"Booooom, Blast & Ruin"	3:16
10.	"Cloud of Stink"	2:55
11.	"Know Your Quarry"	3:29
12.	"Whorses"	3:55

Japanese bonus tracks
No.	Title	Length
13.	"Prey Hey"	3:13
14.	"Eye Lids"	3:32
15.	"Sky Demon"	3:26

French bonus tracks
No.	Title	Length
13.	"Prey Hey"	3:12
14.	"Eye Lids"	3:30
15.	"Mountains" (acoustic)	3:45
16.	"Voice and Electrical Noises" (behind-the-scenes video on bonus DVD)	45:05

Streaming services bonus track (Spotify and iTunes)
No.	Title	Length
13.	"Sky Demon"	3:26

Special edition DVD
No.	Title	Length
1.	"Voice and Electrical Noises" (behind-the-scenes video)	45:05

- "The Captain", "That Golden Rule", "Mountains", "Many of Horror", "Bubbles" and "God & Satan" were released as singles.
- An exclusive track by track video was available with the iTunes release of the album which consisted of a 15-minute video including all 3 members of the band commenting on each track.

=== Limited Edition "Somebody Help Me Play" ===
No.	Title	Length
1.	"The Captain (Without Guitars)"	3:27
2.	"That Golden Rule (Without Guitars)"	3:57
3.	"Shock Shock (Without Guitars)"	3:12
4.	"The Captain (Without Bass)"	3:33
5.	"That Golden Rule (Without Bass)"	3:58
6.	"Shock Shock (Without Bass)"	3:13
7.	"The Captain (Without Drums)"	3:31
8.	"That Golden Rule (Without Drums)"	3:57
9.	"Shock Shock (Without Drums)"	3:08

=== Unreleased track ===
- "I'm Probably in Your Pocket" was originally set to be on Only Revolutions but it was cut from the album. Simon Neil disclosed in an interview with Ultimate Guitar that the band thought the song "wouldn't have fitted on the record". The song was later put on the band's next studio album, Opposites, retitled "Pocket".

=== Editions ===
- Standard CD
- Limited edition CD/DVD that includes an hour-long DVD entitled Voice & Electrical Noises. The DVD features exclusive footage of the band during their stay in Los Angeles whilst they were recording the album at Ocean Way Studios.
- Special box set released exclusively through the official website. There were only 2000 made and it includes the CD/DVD edition of the album, heavyweight 12" vinyl, "Somebody Help Me Play" – play along CD, guitar tab poster, pin badges, plectrum, a full orchestral score, sticker sheet, 12" art print signed by Storm Thorgerson and a piece of one of the actual flags from the album cover art.
- iTunes LP special edition reissue. Featuring all music videos, behind the scenes videos, Voice & Electrical Noises documentary, lyrics and photographs.

== Personnel ==
The following people contributed to Only Revolutions:

Biffy Clyro

- Simon Neil – lead vocals, guitars, piano, theremin ("Born on a Horse", "Shock Shock")
- James Johnston – vocals, bass guitar
- Ben Johnston – backing vocals, drums, percussion

Additional musicians

- Josh Homme – additional guitar ("Bubbles")
- Jamie Muhoberac – keyboards, programming
- Ben Kaplan – additional keyboards, programming

Production

- Garth Richardson – producer, additional editing
- Biffy Clyro – co-producer
- Ben Kaplan – recording, additional editing
- David Schiffman – recording
- Andy Wallace – mixing
- Howie Weinberg – mastering
- Nick Rowe – additional editing
- Wesley M.Seidman – assistant engineer
- Julia Sundström – general assistant

Orchestra

- David Campbell – strings, brass and woodwind arrangements, conductor
- Joel Derouin – violin
- Roberto Cani – violin
- Julian Hallmark – violin
- Tammy Hatwan – violin
- Gerardo Hilera – violin
- Natalie Leggett – violin
- Sid Page – violin
- Sara Parkins – violin
- Vladamir Polimatidi – violin
- Philip Vaiman – violin
- John Wittenberg – violin
- Ken Yerke – violin
- Liam Brennan – violin
- Steve Richards – cello
- Erika Duke – cello
- George Kim Scholes – cello
- Rudolph Stein – cello
- Rick Baptist – trumpet
- Wayne Bergeron – trumpet
- Alan Kaplan – trombone
- Steve Holtman – trombone
- Jonathan Sacdalan – bass clarinet
- Julie Feves – bass clarinet
- Joe Meyer – French horn
- Douglas Tornquist – tuba
- Christian Hughes – Chai Wallah
- Alex Orosa – Violin

== Charts ==
=== Weekly charts ===
Chart (2009–10)	Peak position
Dutch Albums (Album Top 100)	85
German Albums (Offizielle Top 100)	65
Irish Albums (IRMA)	16
Norwegian Albums (VG-lista)	28
Scottish Albums (Official Charts)	2
Swiss Albums (Schweizer Hitparade)	66
UK Albums (Official Charts)	3

=== Year-end charts ===
Chart (2009)	Position
UK Albums (OCC)	127
Chart (2010)	Position
UK Albums (OCC)	26
Chart (2011)	Position
UK Albums (OCC)	105

== Certifications ==
Region	Certification	Certified units/sales
United Kingdom (BPI)	2× Platinum	720,000

== Release history ==
Only Revolutions was released in various countries in 2009.

Country	Release date	Record label	Format	Catalogue number
United Kingdom	9 November 2009	14th Floor	CD	5051865621522
Japan	23 December 2009	Hostess Entertainment	CD	B002UGMFHS
