= Biblical (disambiguation) =

Biblical refers to something related to the Bible.

Biblical may also refer to:

== Music ==
- "Biblical" (song), a 2013 song by the band Biffy Clyro
- Biblical Songs, an 1894 song cycle by Antonín Dvořák
