= Opposites (album) =

2013 studio album by Biffy Clyro

Studio album by Biffy Clyro
- Released: 28 January 2013
- Recorded: 2011–2012
- Studios: The Village (West Los Angeles, California)
- Genres: Alternative rock; progressive rock
- Length: 77:45 (double edition); 39:47 (disc 1); 37:58 (disc 2); 55:04 (single edition)
- Labels: 14th Floor; Warner Bros.
- Producer: Garth "GGGarth" Richardson

Biffy Clyro chronology
| Revolutions: Live at Wembley (2011) | Opposites (2013) | Opposites: Live from Glasgow (2013) |

Singles from Opposites
- 1. "Black Chandelier" Released: 14 January 2013; 2. "Biblical" Released: 29 March 2013; 3. "Opposite" Released: 24 June 2013; 4. "Victory Over the Sun" Released: 8 September 2013

Opposites is the sixth studio album by Scottish alternative rock band Biffy Clyro, which was released on 28 January 2013. A double album, Opposites was originally announced as a pair of albums, The Land at the End of Our Toes and The Sand at the Core of Our Bones, which later became the names of the individual discs of the album. The album features 20 songs across two discs. There is also a single disc version with 14 selected tracks. As of July 2016, the album has sold 260,720 copies in the UK.

== Overview ==
"Stingin' Belle" was the first recorded song to be publicly played, debuting on BBC Radio 1 on 31 July 2012. The song was released online along with a video consisting of material made of the album's recording in Los Angeles and the band's live shows. Although at times discussed as a single, the song was only made available through digital download. Band of Horses' Ben Bridwell features as a guest vocalist on the songs "Opposite" and "Accident Without Emergency".

The first physical single from the album, "Black Chandelier", debuted on BBC Radio 1 and on YouTube on 19 November 2012. The release of the single was announced to take place on 14 January 2013. Actor Ricki Hall disclosed on his Twitter account that the video for the song was being filmed. The video was released on 11 December.

On 14 December, actor Ev Salomon revealed on Twitter that filming of the video for "Victory Over the Sun" had been finished.

Several songs from the album were publicly played live before the release. On 22 September 2012, at the iTunes show in London, the band has already been playing five songs from Opposites: "Stingin' Belle", "Sounds Like Balloons", "The Joke's on Us", "Modern Magic Formula", and "Victory Over the Sun". On 20 November, the band played "Black Chandelier" and "Opposite" on Later... with Jools Holland with guest support musicians Mike Vennart and Richard "Gambler" Ingram (ex.Oceansize, British Theatre)

The single "Biblical" was featured first on Zane Lowe's show on BBC Radio 1 in the UK and on Gary Cool's Rock Dimension in S.A. On Sunday 3 February 2013, Opposites topped the UK Albums Charts, becoming Biffy Clyro's first number one album.

The band posted a short teaser video for the single "Opposite" on YouTube. At the end of the teaser, the band said that the video would be released on 15 May. The artwork for the single was also revealed during the video. It was then revealed that the single "Opposite" would be released 24 June 2013.

== Background ==
There were three years between the releases of Only Revolutions and Opposites, marking the longest gap in Biffy Clyro's publishing history. During this time, the band's rising popularity saw them perform an increasing number of shows, which delayed the work on the new album. The band had been reported to work on the new songs as soon as the spring of 2010. In March 2011, Simon Neil told BBC that he had "15 or 16 songs" ready for the album and that the record would get done "as soon as [they] got off the road". The band played the first new song to later appear on Opposites, entitled "Joke's on Us", on 3 July 2011 at Milton Keynes, in what was set as one of their last gigs before heading to the studio.

The main recording sessions for the album were at The Village Studios in West Los Angeles. They started in early 2012 and lasted for five months. The producer was GGGarth Richardson, returning to the work with Biffy Clyro after producing two of their previous albums, Puzzle and Only Revolutions. Also returning from Only Revolutions was the orchestra and choir conductor David Campbell. The keyboard parts were played by Jamie Muhoberac, who also performed on Only Revolutions. In May 2012, NME announced that the band was going to release two albums, The Land at the End of Our Toes and The Sand at the Core of Our Bones. A month later, it was reported that the band "changed their mind" on the double title. Simon Neil revealed the album's final title on 31 July 2012 on Zane Lowe's show on BBC Radio 1. The release date has been announced on 18 September 2012 on Biffy Clyro's website.

In an interview with Q, the band claimed to have had written 45 songs by the end of 2011. That number was said to give them a feeling of necessity to make Opposites a double album. "There's no filler on this one", Ben Johnston assured in an NME feature. Simon Neil said on Lowe's BBC show: "We wanted to make the first double album that you could enjoyably listen to from start to finish".

== Concept ==
Simon Neil described the theme of Opposites in the following way: "Each album is the exact opposite vibe to the other lyrically (...) One's about putting things in the worst possible way and thinking you're getting yourself into a hole. The other looks at things more positively". James Johnston elaborated in an interview on Rockyourlife.fr:

The Sand... is about past and things that brought you to that point, the difficult things in your life, the things you can't change, the things which are difficult. And The Land... is about what comes next and your hopes and fears about the future, how you can make things better and bring things together in order to move forward.

As the band later related in an NME feature, the duality was impacted by their prolonging touring; Neil said: "We (...) toured for so long, you can get home and feel like you don't belong". The band mentioned the feeling of alienation and resignation and the strains on relations with friends and families which were all induced by long years of touring with Only Revolutions. The songs written in Scotland during that time were said to be "angry, angsty and fractured". As the band members confessed, they felt that the band was on the verge of breaking up. A day before the start of recording, Ben Johnston had a drunk accident and cut his ear, which made him acknowledge his drinking problem. The next months spent in the LA studio, with the band isolated from the outside world, helped them recover emotionally and physically and "very very improve [their] way of life". This influenced the character of material they worked on. NME describes the first album—The Sand...—as having a "dark and solitary" mood, while the second—The Land...—is "uplifting and unifying".

The band numerously described their musical approach to the album as "over the top", referencing the diversity of musical styles and instruments used during recording Opposites. "We're not putting limits on this record (...) Anything we wanted to try, we've been able to try", said Neil on BBC. The album was announced to include a wide array of sound sources, such as bagpipes, kazoos, a mariachi band, tap dancing, church organ, tubular bells, and the "sound of the band's beards being scratched". However, not every experiment found its way to the final album. On the other hand, the songs "Pocket" and "Skylight", which were written before Only Revolutions and had remained unreleased, were included on Opposites.

The album's titles for its two halves both derive from a lyric in the song "Sounds Like Balloons".

== Artwork ==
The album's cover is the last to be designed by Storm Thorgerson, a renowned English graphic designer. Thorgerson died 3 months after the album's release. Thorgerson also created the artwork for Puzzle, Only Revolutions, and the singles from those albums. To reveal the cover on the band's website, Biffy Clyro asked the fans to tweet hashtag #biffyopposites on Twitter. After 9000 tweets in 12 hours, the full cover had become visible. The cover is supposed to depict the oldest living tree in the world, located in Chile. Neil said: "I loved the original image of the tree, and I got thinking about how strong the roots must be, and how strong my band is - how we can deal with anything, because we have each other".

== Critical reception ==
Professional ratings
Aggregate scores
| Source | Rating |
|---|---|
| Metacritic | 68/100 |
Review scores
| Source | Rating |
| AllMusic | 3.5/5 stars |
| Big Cheese | 5/5 stars |
| Clash | 10/10 |
| The Daily Record | 4/5 stars |
| The Daily Telegraph | 3/5 stars |
| The Guardian | 3/5 stars |
| The Irish Times | 4/5 stars |
| Melodic.net | 4/5 stars |
| NME | 7/10 |
| The Observer | 3/5 stars |

Critical response to Opposites has been mostly positive. At Metacritic, which assigns a normalized rating out of 100 to reviews from mainstream music critics, the album received an average score of 68, based on 16 reviews, which indicates "generally favourable reviews". Clash magazine awarded the album a perfect ten out of ten score and praised its "blend of hard rock, progressive invention and beautiful serenity", declaring the record "as complete a work as you are likely to hear all year." Big Cheese writer Ian Chaddock also awarded the album a perfect score of five stars. He called Opposites "special" and noted its varied sound across both discs, writing "From anthemic melodic rock single 'Black Chandelier', the angular-yet-huge 'Sounds Like Balloons' and the sad ballads 'Opposite' and 'The Thaw', it's hit after hit." Al Fox of BBC Music praised the album's "seismic riffs and knockout choruses", before concluding "It's a solid, engaging and high-calibre Biffy Clyro album. And that's no bad thing." John Dingwall of Scottish tabloid The Daily Record awarded the album four stars out of five, and praised the band for making "it seem easy when it comes to intelligent, yet mainstream, rock music."

The Irish Times writer Tony Clayton-Lea also awarded Opposites with four stars out of five and praised its diversity; "From bagpipes (Stingin' Belle) to Mariachi brass (Spanish Radio), from alt.rock (A Girl and His Cat, Little Hospitals) to enormodome anthems (Black Chandelier, Biblical), Opposites has it well and truly sewn up." NME journalist Dan Stubbs described the album as "flipping between edgy and anthemic – Biffy's best modes." Awarding a score of seven out of ten, he summarised that "Opposites is not, as feared, an unedited expanse of rock-band mind splurge, but two albums' worth of well-constructed songs."

Other critics gave a more mixed response, noting that the band is stronger in smaller doses. Indeed, Neil McCormick of The Daily Telegraph awarded the album three stars out of five and concluded "if you're already a Biffy Clyro fan, Opposites might be your idea of a masterpiece. If you're new to Biffy, it'll just give you a headache." Alexis Petridis of The Guardian also awarded the album three stars, declaring that "Opposites may not be the career-defining masterpiece it's intended as, but it's certainly not the pompous disaster it could have been: it has failings, but not the ones you might expect." Sister paper The Observer shared the same view, with Phil Mongredien noting that "across 80 minutes there's the sense they might have spread themselves too thinly."

== Track listing ==
=== Actual album ===
All tracks are written by Simon Neil.

The Sand at the Core of Our Bones track listing
| No. | Title | Length |
|---|---|---|
| 1. | "Different People" | 5:11 |
| 2. | "Black Chandelier" | 4:04 |
| 3. | "Sounds Like Balloons" | 3:46 |
| 4. | "Opposite" | 3:55 |
| 5. | "The Joke's on Us" | 3:34 |
| 6. | "Biblical" | 3:58 |
| 7. | "A Girl and His Cat" | 3:29 |
| 8. | "The Fog" | 4:41 |
| 9. | "Little Hospitals" | 3:32 |
| 10. | "The Thaw" | 3:42 |

iTunes deluxe edition bonus track
| No. | Title | Length |
|---|---|---|
| 11. | "The Sand at the Core of Our Bones" | 1:47 |

The Land at the End of Our Toes track listing
| No. | Title | Length |
|---|---|---|
| 1. | "Stingin' Belle" | 4:25 |
| 2. | "Modern Magic Formula" | 3:54 |
| 3. | "Spanish Radio" | 3:51 |
| 4. | "Victory Over the Sun" | 3:59 |
| 5. | "Pocket" | 3:06 |
| 6. | "Trumpet or Tap" | 3:56 |
| 7. | "Skylight" | 3:44 |
| 8. | "Accident Without Emergency" | 4:52 |
| 9. | "Woo Woo" | 2:18 |
| 10. | "Picture a Knife Fight" | 3:53 |

iTunes deluxe edition bonus track
| No. | Title | Length |
|---|---|---|
| 11. | "The Land at the End of Our Toes" | 2:16 |
| 12. | "Pocket" (acoustic; US bonus track) | 3:00 |

=== Limited edition "We've Got To Play Together" CD 3 ===
All tracks are written by Simon Neil.

"We've Got To Play Together" track listing
| No. | Title | Length |
|---|---|---|
| 1. | "Different People (for Guitarists)" | 5:07 |
| 2. | "Different People (for Bass Players)" | 5:07 |
| 3. | "Different People (for Drummers)" | 5:07 |
| 4. | "Modern Magic Formula (for Guitarists)" | 3:52 |
| 5. | "Modern Magic Formula (for Bass Players)" | 3:52 |
| 6. | "Modern Magic Formula (for Drummers)" | 3:52 |
| 7. | "Spanish Radio (for Guitarists)" | 3:50 |
| 8. | "Spanish Radio (for Bass Players)" | 3:50 |
| 9. | "Spanish Radio (for Drummers)" | 3:50 |

=== Record label edit ===
| No. | Title | Length |
|---|---|---|
| 1. | "Different People" | 5:08 |
| 2. | "Black Chandelier" | 4:04 |
| 3. | "Sounds Like Balloons" | 3:45 |
| 4. | "Opposite" | 3:55 |
| 5. | "The Joke's on Us" | 3:33 |
| 6. | "Spanish Radio" | 3:51 |
| 7. | "Victory Over the Sun" | 3:59 |
| 8. | "Biblical" | 3:57 |
| 9. | "Stingin' Belle" | 4:25 |
| 10. | "Skylight" | 3:44 |
| 11. | "Trumpet or Tap" | 3:56 |
| 12. | "Modern Magic Formula" | 3:54 |
| 13. | "The Thaw" | 3:42 |
| 14. | "Picture a Knife Fight" | 3:53 |
| 15. | "Pocket" (acoustic; US bonus track) | 3:02 |

== Personnel ==
Biffy Clyro

- Simon Neil – lead vocals, guitars
- James Johnston – backing vocals, bass guitar
- Ben Johnston – drums, backing vocals, percussion

Additional personnel

- Ben Bridwell – additional vocals ("Opposite", "Accident Without Emergency")
- Mike Vennart – additional guitar, additional vocals
- David Campbell – string, brass, choir and bagpipe arrangements
- Eric Rigler – bagpipes ("Stingin' Belle")
- Alex Orosa – violin

Production

- Garth Richardson – producer, additional editing
- Biffy Clyro – co-producer
- Ryan Williams – recording
- Ben Kaplan – recording
- Steve Churchyard – additional engineering
- JP Reid – additional engineering
- Nick Rowe – additional engineering
- James Rushent – additional production and programming
- Ted Jensen – mastering engineer

== Charts and certifications ==
=== Weekly charts ===
Weekly chart performance for Opposites
| Chart (2013) | Peak position |
|---|---|
| Australian Albums (ARIA) | 22 |
| Austrian Albums (Ö3 Austria) | 12 |
| Belgian Albums (Ultratop Flanders) | 73 |
| Belgian Albums (Ultratop Wallonia) | 63 |
| Danish Albums (Hitlisten) | 35 |
| Dutch Albums (Album Top 100) | 22 |
| Finnish Albums (Suomen virallinen lista) | 3 |
| German Albums (Offizielle Top 100) | 5 |
| Hungarian Albums (MAHASZ) | 11 |
| Irish Albums (IRMA) | 3 |
| New Zealand Albums (RMNZ) | 25 |
| Norwegian Albums (VG-lista) | 9 |
| Spanish Albums (Promusicae) | 36 |
| Swedish Albums (Sverigetopplistan) | 16 |
| Swiss Albums (Schweizer Hitparade) | 2 |
| UK Albums (Official Charts) | 1 |
| UK Rock & Metal Albums (Official Charts) | 1 |

=== Year-end charts ===
Year-end chart performance for Opposites
| Chart (2013) | Position |
|---|---|
| UK Albums (OCC) | 35 |

=== Certifications ===
Certifications for Opposites
| Region | Certification | Certified units/sales |
|---|---|---|
| Germany (BVMI) | Gold | 100,000^{‡} |
| United Kingdom (BPI) | Platinum | 300,000^{‡} |
^{‡} Sales+streaming figures based on certification alone.
