= Mountains (Biffy Clyro song) =

2008 single by Biffy Clyro

Single by Biffy Clyro

from the album Only Revolutions
- B-side: "Little Soldiers"; "Paperfriend"; "Robbery"
- Released: 18 August 2008
- Recorded: March 2008
- Studio: Sunset Sound Recorders (Hollywood, California)
- Length: 3:23
- Label: 14th Floor
- Songwriters: Simon Neil; Biffy Clyro
- Producers: Garth Richardson; Biffy Clyro

Biffy Clyro singles chronology
"Who's Got a Match?" (2008)	"Mountains" (2008)	"That Golden Rule" (2009)

Only Revolutions track listing
- 1. "The Captain"; 2. "That Golden Rule"; 3. "Bubbles"; 4. "God and Satan"; 5. "Born on a Horse"; 6. "Mountains"; 7. "Shock Shock"; 8. "Many of Horror"; 9. "Booooom, Blast & Ruin"; 10. "Cloud of Stink"; 11. "Know Your Quarry"; 12. "Whorses"

"Mountains" is a song by Scottish band Biffy Clyro, released as a single on 18 August 2008. Originally released as a non-album single, it would later be included on the band's fifth studio album, Only Revolutions, in 2009. It was originally entitled "Teeth or Mountains" and was first played live at the Electric Festival in Getafe, Spain, on 30 May 2008.

"Mountains" is the band's highest-charting single on the UK Singles Chart, peaking at number five. It topped the Scottish Singles Chart, giving Biffy Clyro their third number one there. Outside the United Kingdom, "Mountains" reached number 55 in Australia and number 42 in Ireland.

== Release and reception ==
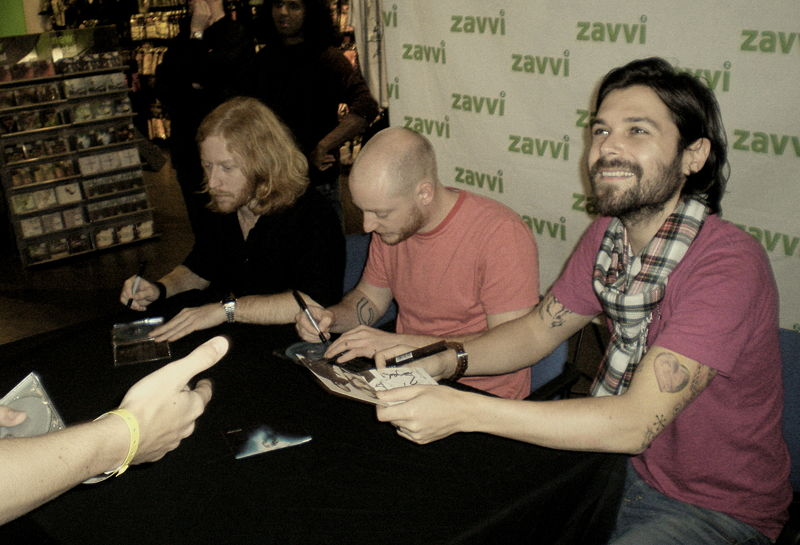
The band signing copies in Glasgow, 25 August 2008

Taking a short break from touring with Say Anything in March 2008, the band recorded the song in Los Angeles, with producer Garth Richardson, who produced the band's previous album, Puzzle.

After appearing in many of the band's summer setlists, the song made its radio debut on Zane Lowe's BBC Radio 1 show on Friday 19 June 2008 and was introduced as "The Hottest Record in the World Today".

To coincide with the single's physical release, the band embarked on a promotional tour across the UK performing acoustic sets in record stores and signing copies of the single.

== Composition ==
The song is notably more radio-friendly than the band's previous releases, due to its fairly normal song structure and heavy emphasis on melody. It is also one of their first songs to feature a piano. Despite its radio-friendly style, the song incorporates an unusual time signature of 15/16 throughout the verses, while the post-choruses switch between 4/4 and 2/4.

== B-sides ==
"Paperfriend" was a track recorded for Puzzle in 2007 that didn't make the cut. Lyrics from the track, "Help Me Be Captain", can be heard in the song. "Little Soldiers" appeared in the band's acoustic sets promoting the single.

== Track listings ==
Songs and lyrics are by Simon Neil, music by Biffy Clyro. All songs were published by Good Soldier Songs.

- UK CD single
1. "Mountains"
2. "Little Soldiers"
- UK 7-inch picture disc 1

A. "Mountains"
B. "Paperfriend"

- UK 7-inch picture disc 2

A. "Mountains"
B. "Robbery"

- Digital download
1. "Mountains" – 3:23

== Personnel ==
Personnel are lifted from the CD and 7-inch release liner notes.

- Simon Neil – guitar, piano, vocals, writer
- Ben Johnston – drums, vocals
- James Johnston – bass, vocals, recording (of "Little Soldiers" & "Robbery")
- Garth Richardson – producer
- Andy Wallace – mixing
- David Schiffman – engineering
- Ben Kaplan – engineering
- Mike Fraser – engineering (of "Paperfriend")
- John O'Mahony – mix engineer
- Howie Weinberg – mastering
- Mark Williams – mixing (of "Little Soldiers" & "Robbery)
- Frank Arkwright – mastering (of "Little Soldiers", "Robbery" & "Paperfriend")
- Alex H. N. Gilbert – artist and repertoire, and additional production
- OXEN – cover art and design

== Charts ==
=== Weekly charts ===
Chart (2008)	Peak position
Australia (ARIA)	55
Euro Digital Song Sales (Billboard)	9
Ireland (IRMA)	42
Scottish Singles Sales (Official Charts)	1
UK Singles (Official Charts)	5

=== Year-end charts ===
Chart (2008)	Position
UK Singles (OCC)	97

== Certifications ==
Region	Certification	Certified units/sales
United Kingdom (BPI)	Platinum	600,000^{‡}
^{‡} Sales+streaming figures based on certification alone.

== Use in media ==
The song was used for the credits for XXXX Gold Beach Cricket. Mountains was included in Colin McRae: DiRT 2 in a video tribute to the late Scottish rally driver Colin McRae. This song also appears on Shift 2: Unleashed and SBK X: Superbike World Championship.
