= Folding Stars =

2007 single by Biffy Clyro

- CD cover

Single by Biffy Clyro

from the album Puzzle
- B-side: "Asexual Meat Kitchen"; "Coward"; "A Headline"
- Released: 16 July 2007
- Recorded: The Warehouse Studio (Vancouver, British Columbia); The Farm Studios (Gibsons, British Columbia)
- Genre: Alternative rock, emo
- Length: 4:15 (album version); 3:56 (single version)
- Label: 14th Floor
- Songwriter: Simon Neil
- Producers: Garth Richardson; Biffy Clyro

Biffy Clyro singles chronology
"Living Is a Problem Because Everything Dies" (2007)	"Folding Stars" (2007)	"Machines" (2007)

Puzzle track listing
- 1. "Living Is a Problem Because Everything Dies"; 2. "Saturday Superhouse"; 3. "Who's Got a Match?"; 4. "As Dust Dances"; "2/15ths" 5. "A Whole Child Ago"; 6. "The Conversation Is..."; 7. "Now I'm Everyone"; 8. "Semi-Mental"; "4/15ths" 9. "Love Has a Diameter"; 10. "Get Fucked Stud"; 11. "Folding Stars"; 12. "9/15ths" 13. "Machines"

"Folding Stars" is a song by Scottish band Biffy Clyro from their 2007 album, Puzzle. It was released as the third physical single from Puzzle, on 16 July 2007 and reached number 18 on the UK Singles Chart.

== Overview ==
"Folding Stars" was inspired by the death of Simon Neil's mother, Eleanor, in March 2004. The song has been described as a "huge, hands-in-the-air anthem", "the album’s finest heart-on-sleeve moment" and "raw, honest and breathtaking".

Simon Neil has commented on the song, saying:

This song is for a loved one.

It was definitely the toughest song I've ever had to record. It's the most raw and exposed I've ever felt - I'm still not sure if I want to play it live, but it was the only way for me to deal with it. It's such a cliché and usually I hate people that spout shit like this... but having the chance to sing about my mum dying was therapeutic.

Personally, it's a very important song to me. It's the most straight pop ballad - I hate the word "ballad" - let's say slow song we've done. It turned out perfectly. it's a sweet song and is a balance to the craziness.

She really liked the quiet songs, so I wrote the song for her. It's the kind of song she'd like and although it was really tough to record, I'm immensely proud of it. it makes me happy when people say they connect with the song but I'm not sure if we'll ever play it live. Not any time soon, anyway.

The song was first performed live on 8 July 2007, at the Radio 1/NME Stage at T in the Park 2007. Mike Vennart of Oceansize, a long-time friend of the band, provided second guitar for this performance. On 26 August 2007, the band played at Leeds Festival and stated that it was the last time that Folding Stars would be played live. They however reneged on this decision when the song was played live at Brixton Academy on 21 November 2007. An acoustic version of this song was performed by Simon on his own at their Wembley Arena show in 2010. It was played again by the band on BBC Radio 1 Live Lounge on 19 August 2013, and later as part of the band's headline performances at Reading and Leeds festivals, 25 and 23 August, respectively. Simon Neil later played the song on 3 April 2020 as part of a Facebook live session in the coronavirus lockdown.

The physical release of the single topped the UK Physical Singles Chart, while the single overall peaked at number 18 on the UK Singles Chart.

== Music video ==
The song's official music video was directed by Howard Greenhalgh and filmed at Painshill, a landscape park in Surrey. It features the band playing at various locations in the park, including the Gothic Temple, Abbey and Crystal Grotto.

== Track listing ==
Music and lyrics by Simon Neil.

- CD 14FLR24CD
1. "Folding Stars" – 4:15
2. "Asexual Meat Kitchen" – 3:29
- 7" #1 14FLR24V1
1. "Folding Stars" – 4:15
2. "Coward" – 3:40
- 7" #2 14FLR24V2
1. "Folding Stars" – 4:15
2. "A Headline" - 3:39
- Digital download
1. "Folding Stars" – 3:56
- iTunes exclusive
1. "Folding Stars" (demo) – 4:30

== Personnel ==
- Simon Neil – guitar, vocals
- James Johnston – bass, vocals
- Ben Johnston – drums, vocals
- Garth Richardson – producer

== Charts ==
Chart (2007)	Peak position
Scotland Singles (OCC)	2
UK Singles (OCC)	18
