= Rivers of Heresy =

Studio album by Empire State Bastard
- Released: 1 September 2023
- Studio: Infinity Land, Scotland; Trap Door, Liverpool; Ritmo, California
- Genre: Alternative metal
- Length: 35:22
- Label: Roadrunner
- Producer: Mike Vennart; Simon Neil; Adam Noble; Dave Lombardo (drums)

Singles from Rivers of Heresy
- 1. "Harvest" Released: 24 March 2023; 2. "Stutter" Released: 2 June 2023; 3. "The Looming" Released: 24 July 2023; 4. "Moi?" Released: 22 August 2023

Rivers of Heresy is the debut album by British duo Empire State Bastard, consisting of Simon Neil of Biffy Clyro and Mike Vennart of Oceansize, released on 1 September 2023 through Roadrunner Records. The album also includes Dave Lombardo on drums.

== Background ==
Vennart stated that his approach was to "mak[e] the most fucking poisonous vile music [he] possibly could, just unabridged hatred in musical form", while Simon Neil called it "lyrically [...] as misanthropic and nihilistic as [he's] ever written". The project was initially stated to be a grindcore project, with a writer for Metal Injection finding the final result to be of varying styles of heavy metal instead.

== Critical reception ==
Professional ratings
Aggregate scores
Source	Rating
Metacritic	69/100
Review scores
Source	Rating
Kerrang!	4/5
The Line of Best Fit	7/10
Mojo	3/5 stars
NME	4/5 stars
The Skinny	3/5 stars

Rivers of Heresy received a score of 69 out of 100 on review aggregator Metacritic based on five critics' reviews, indicating "generally favorable" reception. Mojo wrote that "Empire State Bastard make you feel like you've been in a cage fight with Mike Tyson". James Hickie of Kerrang! remarked that the album "manages to surprise by bringing out lesser seen sides of its creators", as Vennart "has long showcased a songwriter of craftsmanship and nuance, so it's startling to hear him being so unremittingly brash here. As it is to find Simon, no stranger to moments of righteous indignation in Biffy, letting rip in larger, scarier increments".

Andrew Trendell of NME thought the album "too hard for most Biffy fans and not pure enough for many Slayer faithful, but it's its own wonderfully weird wee beast. These are the sharper edges that Neil let out on Biffy's earlier work, but elevated that the pure ultraviolence of Vennart's songwriting and madcap riffery". The Line of Best Fit's Elliot Burr stated that "the mathy and shouty post-hardcore of Neil's early noughties output turns its intentionally ugly head once again on the aptly dubbed Rivers of Heresy", which "flourishes when it veers into heady atmospherics". Joe Goggins of The Skinny described it as "punishingly loud, often furiously paced, and has Neil vocally channeling Chino Moreno as he flits between screaming and singing. When it works, it's thrilling, especially on the moody 'Moi' and the mercurial, atmospheric 'Sons and Daughters'".

== Track listing ==
Lyrics by Simon Neil, published by Concord Music Publishing. Riffs by Mike Vennart, published by Ornamental Songs.

Rivers of Heresy track listing
No.	Title	Length
1.	"Harvest"	2:50
2.	"Blusher"	2:44
3.	"Moi?"	4:23
4.	"Tired, Aye?"	2:43
5.	"Sons and Daughters"	5:37
6.	"Stutter"	2:20
7.	"Palms of Hands"	2:24
8.	"Dusty"	2:13
9.	"Sold!"	3:29
10.	"The Looming"	6:39
Total length:		35:22

== Personnel ==
Musicians

- Simon Neil – vocals, additional guitars, keyboards
- Mike Vennart – guitars, bass
- Dave Lombardo – drums

Technical

- Mike Vennart – production
- Simon Neil – production
- Adam Noble – production, engineering, mixing
- Dave Lombardo – drum production, engineering
- Tom Peters – engineering recording
- Paula Lombardo – assistant engineering on drums
- Steve Durose – additional drum edit
- Frank Arkwright – mastering

Locations

- Recorded at Infinity Land Studios, Scotland, Trap Door Studios, Liverpool & Ritmo Studio, California
- Mastered at Abbey Road Studios, London

Artwork

- Daniel P. Carter – cover artwork
- Andy Pritchard – art direction & design
- Jessica Wild – logo

== Charts ==
Chart performance for Rivers of Heresy
Chart (2023)	Peak position
German Albums (Offizielle Top 100)	69
Scottish Albums (Official Charts)	3
UK Albums (Official Charts)	46
UK Rock & Metal Albums (Official Charts)	3
