= That Golden Rule =

2009 single by Biffy Clyro

Single by Biffy Clyro

from the album Only Revolutions
- B-side: Prey Hey; Eye Lids; Time Jazz
- Released: 23 August 2009
- Recorded: 2009
- Genre: Alternative metal
- Length: 3:50
- Label: 14th Floor
- Songwriter: Simon Neil
- Producer: Garth Richardson

Biffy Clyro singles chronology
"Mountains" (2008)	"That Golden Rule" (2009)	"The Captain" (2009)

Only Revolutions track listing
- 1. "The Captain"; 2. "That Golden Rule"; 3. "Bubbles"; 4. "God and Satan"; 5. "Born on a Horse"; 6. "Mountains"; 7. "Shock Shock"; 8. "Many of Horror"; 9. "Booooom, Blast & Ruin"; 10. "Cloud of Stink"; 11. "Know Your Quarry"; 12. "Whorses"

"That Golden Rule" is the second single to be taken from Scottish alternative rock trio Biffy Clyro's fifth studio album, Only Revolutions, released on 23 August 2009.

The band describe the song as a mixture of prog and stoner rock, citing that "[it's] like Kyuss and Tool playing with some Scottish freaks screaming over the top of it". It received its first radio play in early July 2009, on Zane Lowe's Hottest Record in the World slot on Radio 1. The single debuted at number 10 on the UK Singles Chart on 30 August 2009, as well as number one on the Scottish Singles Chart, making the song the band's fourth and most recent number-one single on that chart. The song was used by Sky Sports in its coverage of Super League from 2011 to 2013.

== Music video ==
The video for That Golden Rule was shot in Chiswick House, West London. It was released on NME's official website on 22 July 2009. The video received heavy airplay on British rock television stations Scuzz and Kerrang! TV and has been A-listed by BBC Radio 1.

== Artwork ==
Storm Thorgerson's artwork for the single references the band's previous studio album, Puzzle, with a missing jigsaw piece resting in front of a sailor. The other man, sailing into the distance, appears to have a jigsaw shaped hole in his side – it is likely that this represents the man depicted on the front cover of Puzzle.

Thorgerson later confirmed this on his official website, stating:

Our design for Biffy was about two boats passing, the receding one representing the previous album [Puzzle] and steered by the puzzle man, into the distance, into the past; the approaching boat steered by the 'women-laden man' pushing forward in the rain, his troubled life etched on his face heading into an uncertain future, into the present, shot for real 'at sea' betwixt Skye and the Scottish mainland.

== Track listing ==
CD single 14FLR38CD

1. "That Golden Rule"
2. "Prey Hey"

7" Picture Vinyl 14FLR38

1. "That Golden Rule"
2. "Eye Lids"

7" Orange Vinyl 14FLR38X

1. "That Golden Rule"
2. "Time Jazz"

iTunes Digital EP

1. "That Golden Rule"
2. "Prey Hey"
3. "Eye Lids"
4. "Time Jazz"

== Charts ==
Chart (2009)	Peak position
Scottish Singles Sales (Official Charts)	1
UK Singles (Official Charts)	10
