= Singles 2001–2005 =

Compilation album by Biffy Clyro
- Released: 7 July 2008
- Genre: Alternative rock; experimental rock; post-hardcore
- Length: 45:20
- Label: Beggars Banquet

Biffy Clyro chronology
Puzzle (2007)	Singles 2001–2005 (2008)	Missing Pieces (2009)

Professional ratings
Review scores
Source	Rating
Drowned in Sound	6/10 link
NME	6/10 link

Singles 2001–2005 is a compilation album by Scottish rock band Biffy Clyro, released 7 July 2008. The album features singles from the band's time with former label, Beggars Banquet.

== Overview ==
In 2006, the band signed to 14th Floor Records while still under contract with Beggars Banquet. The band still had one album left on this contract, therefore this album is to fulfill contractual obligations. Beggars has been criticized for cashing in on the success of 2007's Puzzle. Dozens of fans expressed anger at the label for only releasing a 12 track collection of radio edited singles rather than a more expansive album of b-sides and rarities (as Beggars subsidiary Too Pure had done for mclusky – the mcluskyism retrospective featured 57 tracks over three discs). The band and management are thought not to be pleased with the release and are not expected to promote or even look at it.

The album collects singles from Blackened Sky (2002), The Vertigo of Bliss (2003) and Infinity Land (2004).

== Track listing ==
No.	Title	Length
1.	"27"	3:29
2.	"Justboy"	4:23
3.	"57"	3:23
4.	"Joy.Discovery.Invention"	3:39
5.	"Toys, Toys, Toys, Choke, Toys, Toys, Toys" (radio/single edit)	4:07
6.	"The Ideal Height" (radio/single edit)	3:19
7.	"Questions and Answers"	4:05
8.	"Eradicate the Doubt"	4:27
9.	"There's No Such Thing as a Jaggy Snake" (radio/single edit)	4:58
10.	"Glitter and Trauma" (radio/single edit)	4:06
11.	"My Recovery Injection" (radio/single edit)	3:14
12.	"Only One Word Comes to Mind" (radio/single edit)	3:29

== Credits ==
- Simon Neil – vocals, guitar, composer
- James Johnston – vocals, bass guitar
- Ben Johnston – vocals, drums
- Biffy Clyro – mixing, producer
- Chris Sheldon – producer

== Release history ==
Singles 2001–2005 was released in the UK in 2008.

Country	Release date	Record label	Format	Catalogue number
United Kingdom	7 July 2008	Beggars Banquet	CD	B000W9EL1I
