= Empire State Bastard =

British heavy metal band

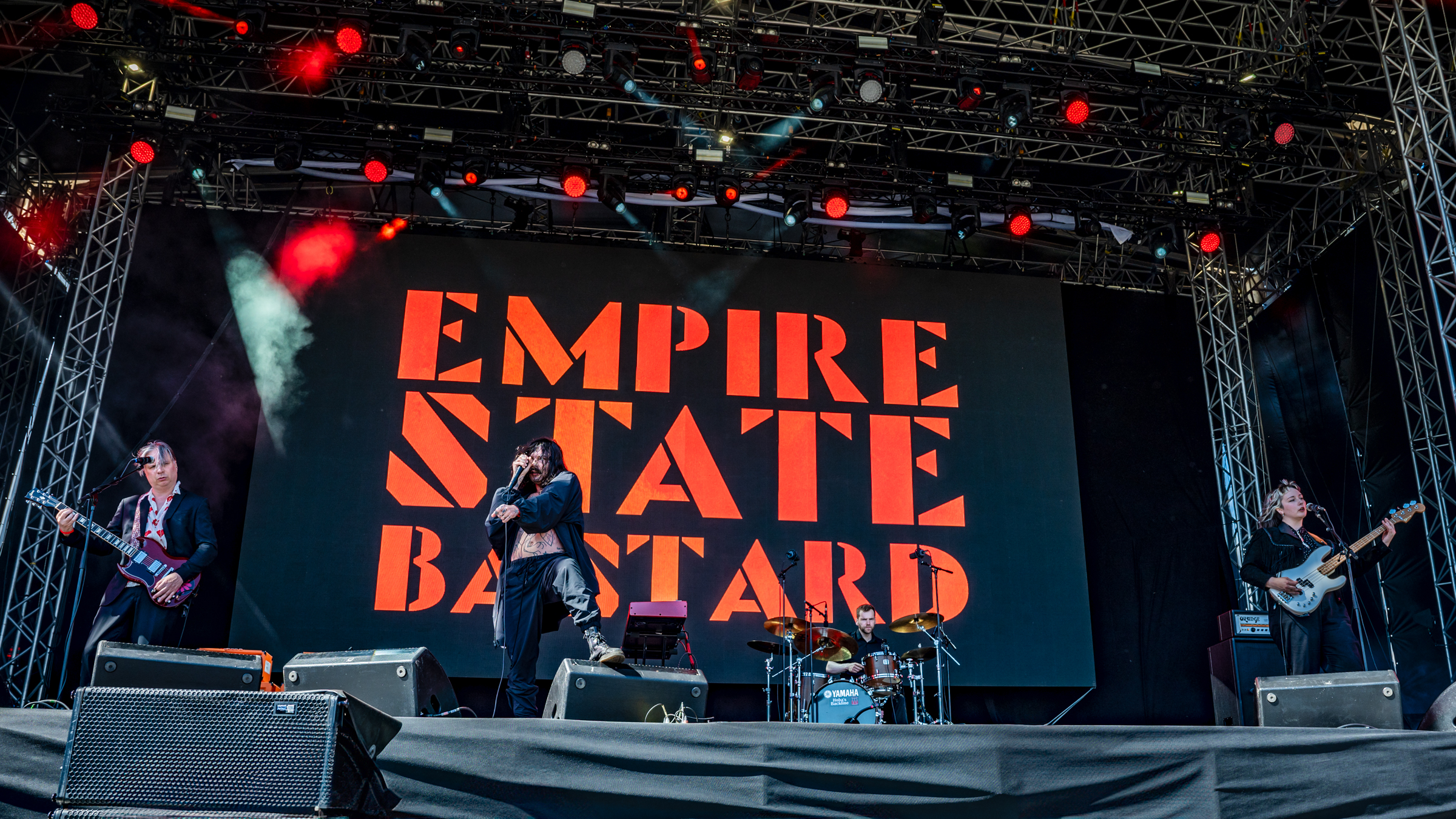
- Empire State Bastard at Tons of Rock 2024

Background information
- Origin: United Kingdom
- Genres: Grindcore; alternative metal; extreme metal; metalcore; hardcore punk
- Years active: 2023–present
- Label: Roadrunner
- Spinoff of: Biffy Clyro
- Members: Simon Neil; Mike Vennart
- Website: empirestatebastard.com

Empire State Bastard are a British metal duo formed of Simon Neil of Biffy Clyro and touring guitarist Mike Vennart (of Cardiacs and formerly of Oceansize).

To date, the duo has released one album, Rivers of Heresy, which was released on 1 September 2023, and debuted at number 46 on the UK Albums (OCC).

== Background ==
In interviews, Vennart stated that the idea of an extreme music band with Neil had existed since he joined Biffy Clyro as a touring guitarist, stating that it was "almost a joke of a band for about 12 years". The idea arose primarily when the friendship between Vennart and Neil was largely based on showing each other the most "mental things" they could find.

The band was announced on the 24 February 2023 through social media. Shortly after, the band announced a run of intimate shows in Glasgow, Manchester and London.

Musically, the band have been described as alternative metal, extreme metal, metalcore, and hardcore punk.

The band have appeared at many festivals across Europe including 2000trees, Copenhell, Download Festival, Graspop Metal Meeting, Hellfest, and Wacken Open Air. They also supported Sleep Token during their 2024 USA tour.

== Members ==
- Simon Neil – vocals, keyboard
- Mike Vennart – guitar, backing vocals

=== Touring members ===
- Dave Lombardo – drums
- Naomi Macleod – bass guitar, backing vocals

== Discography ==
=== Studio albums ===
- Rivers of Heresy (2023)

== Awards and nominations ==
Heavy Music Awards

| Year | Nominee / work | Award | Result |
|---|---|---|---|
| 2024 | Empire State Bastard | Best UK Breakthrough Album | Nominated |
| 2024 | Rivers of Heresy | Best Album Art | Nominated |
