= Black Chandelier =

2013 single by Biffy Clyro

Single by Biffy Clyro

from the album Opposites
- B-side: "The Rain"; "Thundermonster"; "Many of Horror"; "City of Dreadful Night"; "Milky"
- Released: 14 January 2013
- Recorded: 2011–2012
- Studio: Ocean Way Recording, Los Angeles
- Length: 4:06
- Label: 14th Floor
- Songwriter: Simon Neil
- Producer: Garth "GGGarth" Richardson

Biffy Clyro singles chronology
"God and Satan" (2010)	"Black Chandelier" (2013)	"Biblical" (2013)

"Black Chandelier" is a song by Scottish alternative rock band Biffy Clyro, first released in the United Kingdom on 14 January 2013 as the lead single from the band's sixth studio album, Opposites (2013). The track received its first play on 19 November 2012, having been selected as BBC Radio 1 DJ Zane Lowe's Hottest Record in the World. The music video was directed by Big TV. It was the second song, but first official, to be released following a premiere of the non–album track "Stingin’ Belle".

== Background and release ==
The song was released as the lead single from Opposites, and debuted on BBC Radio 1 and on YouTube on 19 November 2012. The release of the single was announced to take place on 14 January 2013. Actor Ricki Hall disclosed on his Twitter account that the video for the song was being filmed. The video was released on 11 December. Alex Meehan from the University of Southampton music magazine wrote that the song "encapsulates the morbid, wishful feel of the album Opposites, within an individual, concentrated dose" and is a song "infused with dark humour and malevolent undertones". Lyrically, "Black Chandelier" has been described as exploring the themes of both emotional rejection and self-doubt.

Commercially, the single debuted within the top ten of the Scottish Singles Charts at number 8, whilst in the United Kingdom it debuted at number 14 on the UK Singles Charts and number 1 on the UK Rock & Metal Singles Charts. It was subsequently certified Silver by the British Phonographic Industry for sales in excess of 200,000 copies in the United Kingdom. In the United States, it reached number 25 on the Billboard Alternative Airplay charts, whilst in peaked at number 38 on the Canada Rock Singles charts. It reached the Top 100 of the singles charts in both the Czech Republic and Ireland.

== Reception ==
Critically, Dan Martin from NME said that the song was "a proper single to get us excited about next year’s album", describing it as "one of their most understated songs ever".

== Track listing ==
Digital download
No.	Title	Length
1.	"Black Chandelier"	4:05
2.	"The Rain"	2:21
3.	"Thundermonster"	3:27
4.	"Many of Horror" (Live at RockNess 2012)	4:27

Vinyl
No.	Title	Length
1.	"Black Chandelier"	4:05
2.	"Milky"	3:35

RSD Exclusive Vinyl Release
No.	Title	Length
1.	"Black Chandelier" (Live Zurich, Switzerland 19.01.13)"	3:57
2.	"City of Dreadful Night"	4:49

== Charts ==
Chart (2013)	Peak position
Canada Rock (Billboard)	38
Czech Republic (Rádio – Top 100)	50
Ireland (IRMA)	75
Scotland Singles (OCC)	8
UK Singles (OCC)	14
UK Rock & Metal (OCC)	1
US Alternative Airplay (Billboard)	25

== Certifications ==
Region	Certification	Certified units/sales
United Kingdom (BPI)	Silver	200,000^{‡}
^{‡} Sales+streaming figures based on certification alone.

== Release history ==
Region	Date	Format
United Kingdom	19 November 2012	Radio airplay
United Kingdom	13 January 2013	Digital Download
United Kingdom	14 January 2013	Vinyl
