= Puzzle (Biffy Clyro album) =

2007 studio album by Biffy Clyro

Studio album by Biffy Clyro
- Released: 4 June 2007
- Studios: The Warehouse (Vancouver, British Columbia); The Farm (Gibsons, British Columbia)
- Genres: Alternative rock; alternative metal
- Length: 48:00
- Labels: 14th Floor; Roadrunner
- Producers: Biffy Clyro; Garth "GGGarth" Richardson

Biffy Clyro chronology
Infinity Land (2004)	Puzzle (2007)	Singles 2001–2005 (2008)

Singles from Puzzle
- 1. "Semi-Mental" Released: 25 December 2006; 2. "Saturday Superhouse" Released: 5 March 2007; 3. "Living Is a Problem Because Everything Dies" Released: 14 May 2007; 4. "Folding Stars" Released: 16 July 2007; 5. "Machines" Released: 8 October 2007; 6. "Who's Got a Match?" Released: 4 February 2008

Professional ratings
Review scores
Source	Rating
AllMusic	3.5/5 stars
Drowned in Sound	7/10
The Guardian	3/5 stars
Kerrang!	5/5 stars
musicOMH	4/5 stars
NME	8/10
Q	3/5 stars
Rock Louder	5/5 stars
The Times	4/5 stars
Rock Sound	10/10

Puzzle is the fourth studio album by Scottish rock band Biffy Clyro, released 4 June 2007 – the album was later released in America on 18 September 2007. It is the band's first album since leaving Beggars Banquet (though the sleeve artwork still features the Beggars Banquet logo).

The album reached No. 2 in the UK Albums Chart to widespread critical acclaim, receiving several perfect ratings and was voted the best album of 2007 by Kerrang! and Rock Sound. The album also reached No. 17 in Ireland, and No. 39 in the overall world charts. The album is certified Platinum in the UK, having sold over 300,000 copies. As of July 2016, it has sold 342,042 copies in the UK.

This album is notable for having somewhat more straightforward song structures and a more melodic overall sound than their previous work, while still retaining some more unusual elements.

== Overview ==
The album was recorded from September to November 2006 at The Warehouse Studio in Vancouver, British Columbia, Canada, and The Farm Studio in Gibsons, British Columbia. It was produced by Garth Richardson, engineered by Mike Fraser, mixed by Andy Wallace in New York, and mastered by Howie Weinberg at Masterdisk. The band said that they had 40 tracks to choose from, and that they had been recording with composer Graeme Revell and the Seattle Symphony Orchestra whilst making the album. The artwork for Puzzle and its subsequent singles was designed by Storm Thorgerson.

== Lyric meaning and music stylistic changes ==
After the release of Infinity Land the band had stated that they felt they had pushed their original sound to its limit, and wanted to try a more straightforward approach to songwriting. Lyrically, the album deals mainly with the death of Simon Neil's mother Eleanor, who had died a few years prior to the recording of Puzzle. The most noticeable difference between Puzzle and the band's previous work is the more streamlined and accessible nature of the songs, with fewer of the abrupt structure and time signature changes which characterised their early material. Influences such as Sunny Day Real Estate and Red House Painters can be heard heavily on this album.

== Critical reception ==
The album received widespread critical acclaim. Kerrang! gave the album a perfect score, calling the album a "masterpiece" and complimented the songs for being "inventive yet accessible". Rock Sound was similarly positive, giving the album a perfect score and noting the album as "the band's most cohesive and accessible record to date but it is also their most ambitious." The Guardian noted the album's "ambitious orchestral metal" but criticised the album for its lack of "choruses that would turn these songs into anthems".

== Track listing ==
All tracks are written by Simon Neil

No.	Title	Length
1.	"Living Is a Problem Because Everything Dies"	5:18
2.	"Saturday Superhouse"	3:19
3.	"Who's Got a Match?"	2:23
4.	"As Dust Dances" (Contains track "2/15ths" – 1:02)	4:34
5.	"A Whole Child Ago"	3:07
6.	"The Conversation Is..."	3:40
7.	"Now I'm Everyone"	3:50
8.	"Semi-Mental" (Contains track "4/15ths" – 0:45)	3:22
9.	"Love Has a Diameter"	3:53
10.	"Get Fucked Stud"	3:37
11.	"Folding Stars"	4:15
12.	"9/15ths"	2:46
13.	"Machines"	3:56

Bonus track on UK limited CD/DVD edition
No.	Title	Length
14.	"Drop It"	2:36

Japanese bonus tracks
No.	Title	Length
14.	"I'm Behind You"	2:34
15.	"Coward"	3:42

On the US and Japanese version the first track was split into "Intro" (1:25) and "Living Is a Problem Because Everything Dies" (3:53)

On the iTunes and Spotify version, the tracks "2/15ths" and "4/15ths" are included at the beginning of "A Whole Child Ago" and "Love Has a Diameter" respectively, instead of at the end of the previous tracks.

=== Unreleased tracks ===
- "Help Me Become Captain" (previously known as "Angels Fall")

was later renamed "Help Me Be Captain" and released as a B-side to "The Captain". The song remained the same as the original version played at live shows in 2005.

- "Captain, Sir..." (a counterpart to "Help Me Become Captain")

was originally a counterpart to "Help Me Become Captain". It was developed into "The Captain" and was included on their 5th album "Only Revolutions" and released as the third single from the album.

- "I'm Probably in Your Pocket"

was originally set to be on Only Revolutions but it was cut from the album. The track was included on Biffy Clyro's sixth studio album Opposites under the title "Pocket".

- "The Ghouls of Bymbombidor"

Sections from this song were used in their 2006 cover of a Weezer song "Buddy Holly" (for Kerrang! magazine cover CD, High Voltage!: A Brief History of Rock) and in the Puzzle album track "9/15ths".

=== Editions ===
- Standard CD
- Limited edition CD/DVD that includes a bonus track, "Drop It" (a re-recording of a demo, "Drop It Dickhead"), as well as a bonus DVD, which includes a 40-minute documentary, The Making of Puzzle, as well as the videos for "Semi-Mental", "Saturday Superhouse" and "Living Is a Problem Because Everything Dies".
- Fans who pre-ordered the iTunes download received a 10-minute video entitled Pieces, which contains footage of the band at their four night run at King Tut's Wah Wah Hut, Glasgow, Scotland, in December 2005, as well as two exclusive bonus tracks:
  - "Semi-Mental" (acoustic)
  - "As Dust Dances" (acoustic)

These bonus features are unavailable separately.

== Personnel ==
Biffy Clyro

- Simon Neil – vocals, guitar, glockenspiel
- James Johnston – vocals, bass guitar
- Ben Johnston – vocals, drums

Additional personnel

- Graeme Revell – string and choir orchestrations
- Seattle Symphony Orchestra – violins, violas, cellos, choir
- Ben Kaplan – keyboard
- Mike Norman – keyboard, saxophone on "Now I'm Everyone"
- Dorothy Lawson – cello on "Machines"
- Ylber Sejdiu – Model on artwork
- Carolyn Roper – Body artist on artwork

Production

- Garth "GGGarth" Richardson – producer
- Andy Wallace – mixing
- Mike Fraser – engineer
- Howie Weinberg – mastering

== Release history ==
Puzzle was released in various countries in 2007.

Country	Release date	Record label	Format	Catalogue number
United Kingdom	4 June 2007	14th Floor	CD&DVD	825646989355
United Kingdom	4 June 2007	14th Floor	CD	825646997633
United States	18 September 2007	Roadrunner	CD	1686-179762
Japan	10 October 2007	Roadrunner	CD	RRCY-29146
Japan (re-release)	22 April 2009	Roadrunner	CD	RRCY-25106
Canada	2007	14th Floor	CD	2980628
Australia	2007	14th Floor	CD	2564699763
