= God and Satan (song) =

"God & Satan"

Single by Biffy Clyro

from the album Only Revolutions
- B-side: "10 Bodies"; "51 Trumpets"; "Hawkwind"
- Released: 23 August 2010
- Recorded: 2009
- Genre: Alternative rock; acoustic rock
- Length: 3:10
- Label: 14th Floor
- Songwriter: Simon Neil
- Producers: Garth Richardson; Ben Kaplan; David Schiffman

Biffy Clyro singles chronology
"Bubbles" (2010)	"God & Satan" (2010)	"Black Chandelier" (2013)

Only Revolutions track listing
- 1. "The Captain"; 2. "That Golden Rule"; 3. "Bubbles"; 4. "God and Satan"; 5. "Born on a Horse"; 6. "Mountains"; 7. "Shock Shock"; 8. "Many of Horror"; 9. "Booooom, Blast & Ruin"; 10. "Cloud of Stink"; 11. "Know Your Quarry"; 12. "Whorses"

"God & Satan" is the sixth single from Biffy Clyro's fifth album, Only Revolutions. It was released on 23 August 2010 – exactly one year on from the release of the first proper single from the Only Revolutions marketing campaign, "That Golden Rule" ("Mountains", released in 2008, was originally claimed to be a stopgap, non-album release).

== Music video ==
The music video was directed by Corin Hardy and filmed sometime around June/July 2010. It premiered on Channel 4 at 00:10 am on 20 July 2010. The video begins with the band standing in a lake, their bodies submerged under the water with only their heads sticking out. Later, the band, part of a cult, walk through the countryside with a large group of people towards a woodland area where a celebration is taking place. At the end of the video, the band are laid down on the group and covered in rags.

== Track listing ==
CD single 14FLR44CD, 5052498236022

1. "God & Satan" (single version)
2. "Hawkwind"

7" vinyl 14FLR44, 5052498236176

1. "God & Satan" (single version)
2. "10 Bodies"

7" white vinyl 14FLR44x, 5052498236275

1. "God & Satan" (single version)
2. "51 Trumpets"

iTunes digital single

1. "God & Satan"
2. "10 Bodies"
3. "51 Trumpets"
4. "Hawkwind"

== Chart performance ==
On the week of physical release, the single entered the UK Singles Chart at 36, making it the sixth single from Only Revolutions to reach the top 40, and the least successful of these.

Chart (2010)	Peak position
UK Singles (Official Charts)	36

== Certifications ==
Certifications for "God and Satan"
Region	Certification	Certified units/sales
United Kingdom (BPI)	Silver	200,000^{‡}
^{‡} Sales+streaming figures based on certification alone.
