= Mark Joseph (singer) =

English musician

Mark Joseph (born Mark Joseph Muzsnyai, 1981) is an English musician. He was educated at William Austin Junior School in Luton. He became known in 2003 with his single "Get Through", and has achieved four UK top 40 hit singles.

Joseph released his debut single "Get Through" in February 2003, which charted at No. 38 on the UK Singles Chart. His second single, "Fly" reached No. 28. Joseph's debut album, Scream, did not register on the UK Albums Chart, but a further two singles were released which charted, "Bringing Back Those Memories" (UK #34) and "Lady Lady" (UK #36).

He has appeared on T4 and Never Mind the Buzzcocks.

He also sang backing vocals on the recording of the Mod Aid 20 charity record "Whatcha Gonna Do About It", appearing on the recording with Ron Wood, PP Arnold, Ocean Colour Scene’s Steve Cradock, Reg Presley and Chris Farlowe.
