= Opposite (song) =

Single by Biffy Clyro

from the album Opposites
- B-side: "Sorry and Thanks"; "A Tragic World Record"; "Wooden Souvenir"; "Feverish"
- Released: 24 June 2013
- Recorded: 2011–2012
- Studio: Ocean Way Recording, Los Angeles
- Genre: Soft rock
- Length: 3:55
- Label: 14th Floor
- Songwriter: Simon Neil
- Producer: Garth "GGGarth" Richardson

Biffy Clyro singles chronology
"Biblical" (2013)	"Opposite" (2013)	"Victory Over the Sun" (2013)

"Opposite" is a song by Scottish alternative rock band Biffy Clyro, released as the third single from the band's sixth studio album, Opposites (2013), on 24 June 2013.

It made number 49 on the UK singles chart.

== Track listing ==
Digital download
No.	Title	Length
1.	"Opposite"	3:55
2.	"Sorry and Thanks"	3:07
3.	"A Tragic World Record"	3:31
4.	"Wooden Souvenir"	2:31

Vinyl
No.	Title	Length
1.	"Opposite"	3:55
2.	"Feverish"
