= Victory Over the Sun (song) =

Single by Biffy Clyro

from the album Opposites
- B-side: "A Lonely Crowd"; "Fingers and Toes"; "No I'm Not Down"; "Break a Butterfly on a Wheel"
- Released: 8 September 2013
- Recorded: 2011–2012
- Studio: Ocean Way Recording, Los Angeles
- Genre: Alternative rock; new prog
- Length: 4:00
- Label: 14th Floor
- Songwriter: Simon Neil
- Producer: Garth "GGGarth" Richardson

Biffy Clyro singles chronology
"Opposite" (2013)	"Victory Over the Sun" (2013)	"Wolves of Winter" (2016)

"Victory Over the Sun" is a song by Scottish alternative rock band Biffy Clyro that was released as the fourth single from the band's sixth studio album, Opposites (2013), on 8 September 2013.

The band released the official video on YouTube on 25 July 2013.

The song is a playable track in the video game Guitar Hero Live.

== Track listing ==
Digital download (iTunes)
No.	Title	Length
1.	"Victory Over the Sun"	3:59
2.	"A Lonely Crowd"	2:34
3.	"Fingers and Toes"	3:01
4.	"No I'm Not Down"	3:28

Limited vinyl
No.	Title	Length
1.	"Victory Over the Sun"	3:59
2.	"Break a Butterfly on a Wheel"	2:54
