= Bubbles (song) =

Single by Biffy Clyro

from the album Only Revolutions
- B-side: "Sad Sad Songs"; "Hiya"; "Street Love"
- Released: 3 May 2010
- Recorded: 2009
- Genre: Alternative rock, new prog
- Length: 4:22 (single version); 5:01 (album version)
- Label: 14th Floor
- Songwriter: Simon Neil
- Producer: Garth Richardson

Biffy Clyro singles chronology
"Many of Horror" (2010)	"Bubbles" (2010)	"God and Satan" (2010)

Only Revolutions track listing
- 1. "The Captain"; 2. "That Golden Rule"; 3. "Bubbles"; 4. "God and Satan"; 5. "Born on a Horse"; 6. "Mountains"; 7. "Shock Shock"; 8. "Many of Horror"; 9. "Booooom, Blast & Ruin"; 10. "Cloud of Stink"; 11. "Know Your Quarry"; 12. "Whorses"

"Bubbles" is the fifth single taken from Scottish rock band Biffy Clyro's fifth studio album, Only Revolutions. Josh Homme from Queens of the Stone Age, Kyuss and Them Crooked Vultures provides additional lead guitar in the song. Despite being one of the lower charting songs from the album (reaching number 34 on the UK singles chart), it has spent more weeks in the top 100 than any other Biffy Clyro song.

== Background and recording ==
According to the band's official website, the CD single of the song will feature new tracks "Sad Sad Songs", "Hiya" and "Street Love" as B-sides across the formats, CD, 2 x 7" Vinyl and Download. It was added to the BBC Radio 1 A List on 21 April 2010.

In an interview with Kerrang! Simon Neil was quick to praise Josh Homme's guitar skills: "He came to the studio and listened to the song," he said, "and two minutes later, he was playing the best guitar solo you've ever heard." "Street Love" contains the chorus of older bootlegs and live versions of single "That Golden Rule".

== Critical performance ==
When NME commented on Only Revolutions, they said on "Bubbles",

'Bubbles' floats in with a Kings of Leon-ly guitar clang before the kind of needly riff the band first experimented with on ‘The Ideal Height’ from ‘The Vertigo of Bliss’. Josh Homme guests, and it’s the best thing he’s played on in years; years to come, too, if the tunes Them Crooked Vultures are peddling are anything to go by.

== Chart performance ==
After receiving placement on BBC Radio 1's A Playlist, "Bubbles" began to receive increasing amounts of digital downloads throughout April 2010. The single entered the UK Singles Chart at number 93 on 25 April 2010. The following week the single climbed 33 places to number 60. On 9 May 2010, "Bubbles" climbed into the top 40 at number 40, making it the fifth consecutive single from Only Revolutions to enter the UK Top 40. The following week, the single climbed 6 places to its chart peak of 34, before falling back 6 places to 40 on 23 May 2010.

== Track listing ==
CD single 14FLR41X, 5051865731375

1. "Bubbles" – 5:01
2. "Sad Sad Songs" – 2:54

7" blue vinyl14FLR41, 5051865731276

1. "Bubbles" – 5:01
2. "Hiya" – 3:22

7" green vinyl14FLR41CD, 5051865731122

1. "Bubbles" – 5:01
2. "Street Love" – 2:48

iTunes digital EP

1. "Bubbles" – 5:01
2. "Sad Sad Songs" – 2:54
3. "Hiya" – 3:22
4. "Street Love" – 2:48

== Personnel ==
- Simon Neil – guitar and lead vocals
- Ben Johnston – drums and backing vocals
- James Johnston – bass guitar and backing vocals

Additional personnel

- Josh Homme – guitar

== Charts ==
=== Weekly charts ===
Chart (2010)	Peak position
UK Singles (Official Charts)	34

=== Year-end charts ===
Chart (2010)	Position
UK Singles Chart	200

== Certifications ==
Region	Certification	Certified units/sales
United Kingdom (BPI)	Platinum	600,000^{‡}
^{‡} Sales+streaming figures based on certification alone.
