= British Theatre (band) =

English rock band

- Origin: Manchester, England
- Genres: Alternative rock; electronic
- Years active: 2011–present
- Members: Mike Vennart; Richard "Gambler" Ingram
- Website: britishtheatre.bandcamp.com

British Theatre are an English electronic rock band from Manchester, formed in 2011 by former Oceansize members and current Biffy Clyro (Scottish band) touring musicians, Mike Vennart and Richard "Gambler" Ingram.

== History ==
Vennart and Gambler had been playing together in Oceansize for the full thirteen years of the band's existence. In 2016, Vennart recalled "we got together straight off the back of Oceansize. Often in Oceansize there were disagreements about direction: there was one camp that wanted the band to be strictly ‘heavy’ and another that was up for experimenting. We were both in the latter camp. It was obvious it was gonna happen 'cos we’ve been mates longer than we’ve been mates with anyone else." Consequently, British Theatre was conceived as a departure from Oceansize's approach.

The project was initiated and predominantly shaped by Gambler, with Vennart stressing "this is mainly his world. I'm just having a wee holiday." Gambler drew on his experiences of electronic music, initially from having heard Jean-Michel Jarre's Oxygène album when very young, followed by his own experiments with keyboards and recording, as well as his past work as Oceansize's occasional keyboard player (a role he'd taken over following the departure of original bassist/electronics player Jon Ellis in 2006). Contemporary electronic dance music only began to make an impression on the project circa 2011, with Gambler noting "towards the end of Oceansize’s career my tastes had veered towards more left-field electronic music and sound design."

Gambler: "The original idea for British Theatre was born before Oceansize split up. I started doing this weird solo stuff and I thought I could get Mike to sing over some of it. I came up with the name but not much else. Then when Oceansize split up, I started to concentrate on this."

Vennart: "We got to the point where we'd been writing for about a year, just fiddling about with ideas but we'd finished fucking nothing! I was reading a book about Pavement at the time and how in their early days they'd put out 7" records themselves, which inspired us to kick things into gear. I said to Gambler, 'Fuck it, in two weeks' time, let's put three songs out, just for the hell of it', and that became the first EP."

The duo released an untitled EP on 25 February 2012, exactly one year on from their former band's break-up. Having judged that they "felt OK" about the initial results, British Theatre released a second EP, Dyed in the Wool Ghost, on 20 August 2012 as a digital download and on 12-inch vinyl. Vennart recalls that "those EPs were mainly us just spinning our wheels, getting back on the horse as it were," with Gambler adding "I think the first two EPs were us trying to figure out what worked and what didn't."

Following this, the British Theatre project faltered due to Vennart’s commitments to Biffy Clyro tours (with Gambler also joining the touring band). When the duo picked up on the project again a few years later, there were changes and readjustments prior to the release of the full-length debut album, Mastery in 2016. At the time of release, Vennart commented “when we did return to it, we realised that we didn’t like much of the material any more, so we’ve started all over again and it’s turned into something else again.”

Vennart: "We didn't want to do anything that screams 'rock band goes electro!' We made the decision that I wouldn't play guitar on this; sure there's a little bass guitar on a couple of tracks but there's no real drums, no guitar, even the singing's pretty different to anything I've done before. Gambler wrote a lot of the vocal melodies and he doesn't sing, so he doesn't know how the voice fucking works, so I had to sing these weird lines that didn't really make much sense!"

Regarding the duo’s practical approach, Vennart revealed "in terms of guitar, I tried to use only sounds which sounded nothing like guitar. So there's some stuff buried in Dinosaur thanks to this spluttering, glitchy Dwarfcraft fuzz. Really horrible. There's a lot of POG/synth-y guitar in "Gold Bruise". Actually, Gambler plays quite a bit in "Favour the Brave" and some lap steel in "Mastery". There’s actually very little guitar on the whole record!... Vocally, yes, it was quite challenging. I can sometimes be a little set in my ways; I've got a couple of tricks I'm quite good at in terms of singing. But Gambler... didn't really know about what range I can pull off... So, stuff like "Cross the Swords" and "The Cull" were a little uneasy, but came off great."

Mastery was finally released in April 2016. At around the time of the album, Vennart confessed to Prog magazine “I’ve never done anything like it. It’s very electronic, the singing on it is ridiculous. Some of it’s just completely wrong and it shouldn’t work. I think it’s brilliant.” In an interview with The Independent, he added "we wanted to make it as different as possible to anything that we've done before but I didn't realise quite how different it was going to be. I was worried about that at first, to the point where it put me into some sort of paralysis. I couldn't get anything finished but in hindsight, that was a good thing. If we’d finished these songs and put them out as an album two years ago, it wouldn't be anywhere near as good as what we've got now."

Never intended as a touring band, British Theatre only played a single concert (at the Arctangent Festival in Compton Martin UK, on 22 August 2015, at which they were described by Prog magazine as "ambitious, reaching towards the romantically charged, lush experimentalism of Radiohead." While not formally dissolved, the band has been inactive since 2016, with Vennart and Gambler continuing to work together in the "Vennart" project, both live and in the studio.

== Discography ==
- EP EP (self-released, 25 February 2012)
- Dyed in the Wool Ghost EP (Medium Format, 20 August 2012)
- "Cross the Swords" single (self-released, 2015)
- Mastery album (self-released, 2016)
- Live EP (self-released, 2016)
