= The Captain (Biffy Clyro song) =

Single by Biffy Clyro

from the album Only Revolutions
- B-side: Help Me Be Captain; Once an Empire; Party On
- Released: 26 October 2009
- Recorded: 2009
- Genre: Alternative rock
- Length: 3:43
- Label: 14th Floor
- Songwriter(s): Simon Neil
- Producer(s): Garth Richardson

Biffy Clyro singles chronology
"That Golden Rule" (2009)	"The Captain" (2009)	"Many of Horror" (2010)

Only Revolutions track listing
- 1. "The Captain"; 2. "That Golden Rule"; 3. "Bubbles"; 4. "God and Satan"; 5. "Born on a Horse"; 6. "Mountains"; 7. "Shock Shock"; 8. "Many of Horror"; 9. "Booooom, Blast & Ruin"; 10. "Cloud of Stink"; 11. "Know Your Quarry"; 12. "Whorses"

"The Captain" is the third single from Biffy Clyro's fifth studio album, Only Revolutions, released on 26 October 2009. It features a prominent brass section throughout the song. The music video was released on 23 September on NME.com. The B-side "Help Me Be Captain" is an early, more raw sounding, version of the song without brass instruments.

== Released and promotion ==
"The Captain" was released on 26 October 2009 as the third single from Biffy Clyro's fifth album Only Revolutions. To promote the song, the band played the song on several of their live shows around cities in the United Kingdom. The band also performed the track on BBC's Live Lounge in September 2009. The song reached at number 17 on the UK Singles Charts and number one on the UK Rock Chart.

== Music video ==
The music video for "The Captain" depicts Simon Neil as a prisoner aboard a ship inhabited by pirates and other maritime characters. It begins with Simon being whipped by an unidentified pirate, this continues along with various other shots of Simon inside a jail cell and footage of the band performing on the ship's deck. As the video carries on, a fight erupts between two factions aboard the ship and in the chaos, Ben and James steal a key held by the ship's captain and free Simon from his jail cell. The video won the best video award at the 2010 NME Awards, beating off competition from Arctic Monkeys and The Maccabees. The video also won the best video award at the 2010 Kerrang! Awards.

== Track listing ==
CD single 14FLR40CD

1. "The Captain"
2. "Help Me Be Captain"

7" picture vinyl 14FLR40

1. "The Captain"
2. "Once An Empire"

7" red vinyl 14FLR40X

1. "The Captain"
2. "Party On"

iTunes digital EP

1. "The Captain" – 3:43
2. "Help Me Be Captain" – 4:55
3. "Once An Empire" – 2:43
4. "Party On" – 3:06

== Charts ==
Chart (2009–2010)	Peak position
Scotland (OCC)	7
UK Singles (OCC)	17
UK Rock & Metal (OCC)	1

== Certifications ==
Region	Certification	Certified units/sales
United Kingdom (BPI)	Silver	200,000^{‡}
^{‡} Sales+streaming figures based on certification alone.

== Awards and nominations ==
- 2010 NME Awards – "Best Music Video for The Captain" (Won)
