= Biblical (song) =

Single by Biffy Clyro

from the album Opposites
- B-side: "Fingerhut"; "Watch"; "Euphoria"
- Released: 29 March 2013
- Recorded: 2011–2012
- Studio: Ocean Way Recording, Los Angeles
- Genre: Alternative rock
- Length: 3:57
- Label: 14th Floor
- Songwriter: Simon Neil
- Producer: Garth "GGGarth" Richardson

Biffy Clyro singles chronology
"Black Chandelier" (2013)	"Biblical" (2013)	"Opposite" (2013)

"Biblical" is a song by Scottish alternative rock band Biffy Clyro, released as the second single from the band's sixth studio album, Opposites (2013), on 29 March 2013.

It made number 70 on the UK Singles Chart.

== Track listing ==
Digital download
No.	Title	Length
1.	"Biblical"	3:57
2.	"Fingerhut"	3:12
3.	"Watch"	4:00
4.	"Euphoria"	2:57
