= Many of Horror =

2010 single by Biffy Clyro

Single by Biffy Clyro

from the album Only Revolutions
- B-side: "Toottoottoot"; "Lonely Revolutions"; "Creative Burns"
- Released: 18 January 2010
- Recorded: 2009
- Genre: Alternative rock
- Length: 4:19
- Label: 14th Floor
- Songwriter: Simon Neil
- Producer: Garth Richardson

Biffy Clyro singles chronology
"The Captain" (2009)	"Many of Horror" (2010)	"Bubbles" (2010)

Only Revolutions track listing
- 1. "The Captain"; 2. "That Golden Rule"; 3. "Bubbles"; 4. "God and Satan"; 5. "Born on a Horse"; 6. "Mountains"; 7. "Shock Shock"; 8. "Many of Horror"; 9. "Booooom, Blast & Ruin"; 10. "Cloud of Stink"; 11. "Know Your Quarry"; 12. "Whorses"

Music video
- "Many of Horror" on YouTube

"Many of Horror" is a song by Scottish band Biffy Clyro from their fifth studio album Only Revolutions. The song was released as the fourth single from the album on 18 January 2010. The song was recorded at Ocean Way Recording, Hollywood, California and mastered at Masterdisk. The lyrics of the song concern Neil's wife and family. Jacknife Lee, who previously remixed "Silhouettes" for the Biffy Clyro and Sucioperro side project Marmaduke Duke, produced a remix of the song.

Matt Cardle, winner of the 2010 series of The X Factor, recorded a studio version of the song under the title "When We Collide" and released it as his debut single, after having performed it in the final of the competition. Biffy Clyro fans launched an internet campaign to get the original track "Many of Horror" to the festive charts, with fans joining a Facebook campaign urging people to buy Biffy Clyro's original single rather than Cardle's cover version. This resulted in the Biffy Clyro version reaching number 8 on the UK Singles Chart, its highest position ever, and Cardle's version became the UK Christmas number one.

The song is featured on the deluxe edition soundtrack to the film Transformers: Dark of the Moon and is played during the end credits. It was also used by Sky Sports as the song for their closing montage of their 2014 Ryder Cup coverage on 28 September 2014.

== Critical reception ==
Critical reception of "Many of Horror" was generally positive.

Jamie Fullerton of NME called "Many of Horror" a "perfect rock ballad". Tim Newbound of Rock Sound described it as "beautifully serene" and stated it balances out more aggressive songs on the album. Jason Birchmeier of AllMusic described the song as "mellow".

Thom Gibbs of Drowned in Sound was critical of the song, calling it a "so-so ballad" and describing it as "too emo".

== Music video ==
The official music video for the song was directed by Andy Morahan.

== Track listings ==
CD single 14FLR41CD

1. "Many of Horror" – 4:21
2. "Toottoottoot" – 4:16

7-inch blue vinyl 14FLR41

1. "Many of Horror" – 4:21
2. "Lonely Revolutions" – 2:32

7-inch red vinyl 14FLR41X

1. "Many of Horror" – 4:21
2. "Creative Burns" – 2:33

iTunes digital EP

1. "Many of Horror" – 4:21
2. "Toottoottoot" – 4:16
3. "Lonely Revolutions" – 2:32
4. "Creative Burns" – 2:33

== Credits ==
- Artwork (Cover design, photography) – Stormstudios
- Music – Biffy Clyro
- Songwriter (Song lyrics) – Simon Neil
- Producer – Biffy Clyro, Gggarth (tracks: 1)

== Charts ==
=== Weekly charts ===
Chart (2010)	Peak position
Ireland (IRMA)	10
Netherlands (Dutch Top 40)	27
Netherlands (Single Top 100)	11
UK Singles (Official Charts)	8
US Alternative Airplay (Billboard)	33

=== Year-end charts ===
Chart (2010)	Position
UK Albums (OCC)	107

=== Certifications ===
Region	Certification	Certified units/sales
United Kingdom (BPI)	Platinum	600,000^{‡}
^{‡} Sales+streaming figures based on certification alone.

== Matt Cardle version ==
"When We Collide"

Single by Matt Cardle

from the album Letters
- Released: 12 December 2010
- Recorded: 2010
- Genre: Indie pop
- Length: 3:43
- Label: Syco, Sony
- Songwriter: Simon Neil
- Producers: Richard "Biff" Stannard, Ash Howes

Matt Cardle singles chronology
"When We Collide" (2010)	"Run for Your Life" (2011)

In 2010, Matt Cardle, the winner of the seventh series of The X Factor, released a cover of "Many of Horror" as his winner's single, renamed "When We Collide". It was made available as a digital download on 12 December 2010 shortly after the show had ended. A physical CD single was released on 15 December 2010.

=== Background ===
In December 2010, Cardle stated that "I know there are some Biffy fans that are like, 'What have you done to that song?'...It's a great song. I'm hoping that I've done it justice." Referring to the Facebook campaign to make the original version of the song number 1 in the chart, Cardle said, "If that happens then great - it's a great song".

=== Critical reception ===
Professional ratings
Review scores
Source	Rating
BBC	1/5 stars
Digital Spy	(Positive)
Female First	4/5 stars
The Beat Review	4.5/5 stars
Unreality Shout	2/5 stars

Critical reception of Cardle's version of the song was mostly positive although many reviewers noted they preferred the original version. Nick Levine of Digital Spy praised Cardle's vocals, stating he delivered "the violence-tinged lyrics with an appealing sense of intimacy, navigating the inevitable key change with ease and really smashing it on the final note". Rachael Patan of Femalefirst.com and The Beat Review applauded the song choice with the latter stating "his untimely cover of Biffy Clyro’s 'Many of Horror' is a very clever and risque thing to do and we applaud him for that". Fraser McAlpine of the BBC Chart Blog, was much more negative. He stated, "on the evidence of this song, he sure as hell can't sing." Unrealityshout.com agreed, stating "I actually find it very hard to listen to such a heroically valiant vocal from the Biffy Clyro clan get turned into a whimpering, reedy, falsetto-ridden snoozefest".

=== Chart performance ===
On 16 December 2010, "When We Collide" debuted at number one on the Irish Singles Chart, where it stayed for five weeks. On 19 December, it charted number one in the UK Singles Chart, beating "What's My Name?" by Rihanna featuring Drake and "Surfin' Bird" by The Trashmen to 2010’s Christmas number one, whilst the Biffy Clyro original of "Many of Horror" re-entered the chart at number eight. With sales of 815,000, it was the second best-selling single of 2010; the number one being "Love the Way You Lie" by Eminem featuring Rihanna, which sold 854,000 copies during 2010. In June 2012, It became the 123rd single to sell a million copies in the UK, and the fourth by an X Factor contestant, after Shayne Ward's "That's My Goal", Leona Lewis's "Bleeding Love" and Alexandra Burke's "Hallelujah". "When We Collide" is the 124th best selling song of all time in the UK. It has sold 1,010,000 copies in the UK as of December 2015.

=== Music video ===
The official music video for Cardle's version of the song was also directed by Andy Morahan.

=== Track listings ===
- Digital download
1. "When We Collide" - 3:38
2. "Matt's Thank You Message" - 0:14
- CD single
1. "When We Collide" - 3:38
2. "Just the Way You Are" (X Factor performance) - 2:26
3. "The First Time Ever I Saw Your Face" (X Factor performance) - 2:37
4. "Nights in White Satin" (X Factor performance) - 2:17

=== Charts ===
==== Weekly charts ====
Chart (2010)	Peak position
Ireland (IRMA)	1
Scottish Singles Sales (Official Charts)	1
UK Singles (Official Charts)	1

==== Year-end charts ====
Chart (2010)	Position
Ireland (IRMA)	1
UK Singles (OCC)	2

=== Certifications ===
Region	Certification	Certified units/sales
United Kingdom (BPI)	Platinum	600,000^{^}
^{^} Shipments figures based on certification alone.
