= Saturday Superhouse =

2007 single by Biffy Clyro

- CD Cover

Single by Biffy Clyro

from the album Puzzle
- B-side: "Scared of Lots of Everything"; "I'm Behind You"; "Miracle of Survival"
- Released: 5 March 2007
- Recorded: The Warehouse (Vancouver, British Columbia; The Farm (Gibsons, British Columbia)
- Length: 3:19
- Label: 14th Floor
- Songwriter: Simon Neil
- Producers: Garth Richardson; Biffy Clyro

Biffy Clyro singles chronology
"Semi-Mental" (2006)	"Saturday Superhouse" (2007)	"Living Is a Problem Because Everything Dies" (2007)

"Saturday Superhouse" is a song by Biffy Clyro and the first physical single from their fourth album, Puzzle. It was released on 5 March 2007. The band undertook a promotional tour of UK HMV stores to coincide with the release of the single.

== Overview ==
Simon Neil has commented on the song, saying:

This is a straight up pop-rock song. It felt great from the first time we played it together. It's about not knowing if you're making the right choices in life. Life is happening right now and if you're not careful you could wish it away.

The song was first played live on 6 December 2006 at a warm-up concert at The Ice Factory nightclub in Perth, Scotland and first aired on radio on The Rock Show on BBC Radio 1, on 9 January 2007. B-sides "Scared of Lots of Everything" and "I'm Behind You" were first performed live on 16 December 2005 on the last night of Biffy's four night run at Glasgow's King Tut's Wah Wah Hut, a gig which showcased material that Biffy had written and recorded for the fourth album that at the time was due for release in the summer of 2006. The single was B-listed on the BBC Radio 1 playlist. The song reached number nine in the UK mid-week chart, and number 13 on the UK Singles Chart, becoming Biffy Clyro's highest charting single at the time. It also reached number one on the Scottish Singles Chart, the band's first of four singles to do so (see Scottish Singles and Albums Chart). All three b-sides were recorded by DP Johnson and mixed by Mark Williams.

== Cover art ==
Storm Thorgerson has commented on the cover art of "Saturday Superhouse", saying:

Simon Neil, Biffy's singer, had experienced a bereavement. We asked him to explain the music and he sent an email with three words: Anger, Grief and Sanity. The fire represented anger, the explosion of tears represented grief, and we chose to represent sanity by showing that people can live with their demons. The figure is content with bats and snakes and the black dog of despair. He looks quite happy.

== Track listings ==
Songs and lyrics by Simon Neil. Music by Biffy Clyro.

- CD 14FLR19CD
1. "Saturday Superhouse" – 3:19
2. "Scared of Lots of Everything" – 3:54
- 7" vinyl #1 14FLR19V1
1. "Saturday Superhouse" – 3:19
2. "I'm Behind You" – 2:36
- 7" vinyl #2 14FLR19V2
1. "Saturday Superhouse" – 3:19
2. "Miracle of Survival" – 4:53
- Digital download
1. "Saturday Superhouse" – 3:19
- iTunes exclusive
1. "Saturday Superhouse" (acoustic)
- 7digital download exclusive - Saturday Superhouse (Live)
1. "Saturday Superhouse" (Live at Belfast Mandela Hall)
2. "Saturday Superhouse" (Live at Dublin Ambassador)
3. "Saturday Superhouse" (Live at Cardiff University)
4. "Saturday Superhouse" (Live at Bristol Academy)
5. "Saturday Superhouse" (Live at Nottingham Rock City)
6. "Saturday Superhouse" (Live at Southampton Guildhall)
7. "Saturday Superhouse" (Live at Norwich UEA)
8. "Saturday Superhouse" (Live at Manchester Academy)
9. "Saturday Superhouse" (Live at Newcastle Academy)
10. "Saturday Superhouse" (Live at Glasgow Barrowlands)
11. "Saturday Superhouse" (Live at Liverpool Academy)
12. "Saturday Superhouse" (Live at Birmingham Academy)
13. "Saturday Superhouse" (Live at London Astoria)

== Personnel ==
- Simon Neil – guitar, vocals
- James Johnston – bass, vocals
- Ben Johnston – drums, vocals
- Garth Richardson – producer

== Charts ==
Chart (2007)	Peak position
Scotland Singles (OCC)	1
UK Singles (OCC)	13
