= Living Is a Problem Because Everything Dies =

2007 single by Biffy Clyro

- CD Cover

Single by Biffy Clyro

from the album Puzzle
- B-side: "Kittens, Cakes and Cuddles"; "Loneliness"; "Relief or Fight"
- Released: 14 May 2007
- Recorded: The Warehouse (Vancouver, British Columbia); The Farm (Gibsons, British Columbia)
- Length: 5:18 (album version); 3:33 (single version)
- Label: 14th Floor
- Songwriter: Simon Neil
- Producers: Garth Richardson; Biffy Clyro

Biffy Clyro singles chronology
"Saturday Superhouse" (2007)	"Living Is a Problem Because Everything Dies" (2007)	"Folding Stars" (2007)

"Living Is a Problem Because Everything Dies" is the opening song on Scottish band Biffy Clyro's fourth album, Puzzle. It was released on 14 May 2007, as the second physical single from the album. The song itself, without any B-sides, was released as a digital download on 7 May 2007.

In the week after its download release, but before its CD release, the single reached number 72 on the UK Singles Chart before peaking at number 19 the week of its release. The same week, the song became the band's second number-one single on the Scottish Singles Chart, after "Saturday Superhouse". The song was the first single released by the band in the United States, and was the first single released there for Puzzle. It was added to the playlists of several radio stations in the United States—including WBRU, WQEX and WHHZ—which allowed the song to reach number 47 on the Mediabase Alternative Airplay chart.

== Overview ==
Simon Neil has commented on the song, saying:

This is one of the first songs I wrote for the record and it has changed very little since its conception. I always knew I wanted a choir and strings on it, and it has a real epic feel. It's about not wanting to waste your life, but about having no idea where to turn and suddenly being aware of your own mortality.

This sums up the new record and shows that we're not happy to plough the same same kind of furrow as we've done before. We wanted something epic and over-the-top and something the three of us would find hard to do.

He also added that it is "about hitting a low point and not giving a fuck. It was classic depression, I suppose."

The song was first played on BBC Radio 1 by Zane Lowe on 13 March 2007 in The Hottest Record In The World segment. On 29 March, it was announced that the track will be released as a single (instead of "The Conversation Is...", as originally planned), following a "fairly wonderful" reaction to the track when played on Zane Lowe's Radio One show.

== Composition ==
The guitars and bass in "Living is a Problem Because Everything Dies" are in Drop C tuning, which is a notable variation from Biffy Clyro's preferred tuning: Drop D.

The opening string and piano arrangements of the track are an interpolation of the opening of Yummy Yummy Yummy by Arthur Resnick and Joey Levine.

The track features string and choir arrangements by Hollywood composer Graeme Revell, performed by the Seattle Symphony Orchestra. The band has used string sections before in the songs "With Aplomb" and "Now the Action Is On Fire!" from 2003's The Vertigo of Bliss, but this is the first time the band has worked with an orchestra. The orchestra is also featured on the track "9/15ths". The arrangement was written by the band themselves.

== Track listings ==
Songs and lyrics by Simon Neil. Music by Biffy Clyro.

- CD 14FLR21CD
1. "Living Is a Problem Because Everything Dies (Radio Edit)" – 3:33
2. "Relief Or Fight" – 4:09
- 7" #1 14FLR21V1
1. "Living Is a Problem Because Everything Dies (Radio Edit)" – 3:33
2. "Loneliness" – 2:33
- 7" #2 14FLR21V2
1. "Living Is a Problem Because Everything Dies (Radio Edit)" – 3:33
2. "Kittens, Cakes and Cuddles" – 3:34
- Digital download
1. "Living Is a Problem Because Everything Dies (Radio Edit)" – 3:33
- iTunes exclusive
1. "Living Is a Problem Because Everything Dies (Demo)" - 5:14
- 7digital exclusive
1. "Living Is a Problem Because Everything Dies (Live at Glasgow Carling Academy on 29 April 2007)"

== Personnel ==
- Simon Neil – guitar, vocals
- Ben Johnston – drums
- James Johnston – bass
- Garth Richardson – producer
- Graeme Revell – string and choir orchestrations
- Seattle Symphony Orchestra – violins, violas, cellos, choir

== Charts ==
Chart (2007)	Peak position
Scotland Singles (OCC)	1
UK Singles (OCC)	19
US Alternative Radio Airplay (Mediabase)	47
