= 14th Floor Records =

British record label

14th Floor Records is a British subsidiary record label of Warner Music UK, founded in 2002 by part owner Christian Tattersfield. The label has released albums by artists including: Biffy Clyro, Damien Rice, David Gray, Longview, Mark Joseph, Nerina Pallot, Ray LaMontagne and The Wombats.

Tattersfield was named as CEO of Warner Music UK and Chairman of Warner Bros. Records UK on 6 August 2009.

== Current artists ==
- Biffy Clyro
- Damien Rice
- Joshua Radin
- Marmaduke Duke
- The Wombats
- Birdy
- You&Me

== Former artists ==
- All the Young
- Joseph Arthur
- David Gray
- Mark Joseph
- Ray LaMontagne
- Longview
- Longwave
- Nerina Pallot
- Sneaky Sound System
