= Chris Sheldon =

English record producer

Chris Sheldon (born 25 September 1962) is an English record producer, particularly of rock music based in London, England. He has produced or mixed records for the Foo Fighters, Garbage, Big Country, Feeder, Therapy?, Biffy Clyro, Oceansize, Pixies and Shed 7. He lives in London, is married and has two daughters.

== Career ==
Sheldon was born in Pakistan when his parents were posted abroad for work and grew up in Surrey. He took his first steps in the music industry when he was a drummer in several local punk bands.

In the mid-1980s he worked as engineer in productions of artists such as Dead or Alive, Prefab Sprout, Elkie Brooks and Roger Waters. One of his first own productions was The Mission's 1990 album Carved In Sand. Therapy?'s EP "Shortsharpshock" reached number 9 in the UK Singles Chart on 20 March 1993. Their album Troublegum reached number 5 in the UK Albums Chart on 19 February 1994. Shed Seven's single "Going For Gold" entered the UK chart on 23 March 1996 at number 8.

== Selected discography ==
Key = p (produced), p/m (produced/mixed), m (mixed), e (engineered)

=== 1980s ===
- Re-Flex - The Politics of Dancing (1983), e
- Dead or Alive - Sophisticated Boom Boom (1984), e
- The Icicle Works - If You Want to Defeat Your Enemy, Sing His Song (1987) m/e
- Roger Waters - Radio K.A.O.S. (1987) m/e

=== 1990s ===
- Pixies - "Dig for Fire" (single) (1990) m/e
- Therapy? - Troublegum (1994) p/m
- Gun - Swagger (1994) p/m
- Radiohead - "Itch EP" (1994) m
- The Almighty - Crank (1994) p/m
- Terrorvision - How To Make Friends And Influence People (1994) m
- Big Country - Why the Long Face (album) (1995) p/m/e
- China Drum - Goosefair (1996) m
- Shed Seven - A Maximum High (1996) p/m
- Feeder - Swim (1996) p/m
- The Almighty - Just Add Life (1996) p
- Feeder - Polythene (1997) p/m
- Mike Scott - Still Burning (1997) m
- Foo Fighters - The Colour and the Shape (1997) m
- Velvet Jones - Colin (1997) p/m
- Anthrax - Volume 8: The Threat Is Real (1998) m
- Radiator - "Resistor" (Single) (1998) m
- Therapy? - Semi-Detached (1998) p/m
- Feline - Feline (1998) p/remix selected tracks
- Summercamp - (1998) p/m
- 3 Colours Red - Revolt (1999) m
- Jeff Beck - Who Else! (1999) m
- Idlewild - "When I Argue I See Shapes" (single) (1999) m
- Shed Seven - Going For Gold (1999) m

=== 2000s ===
- The Vandals - Look What I Almost Stepped In... (2000) m/e
- Ruby Cruiser - Twelve Short Stories (2000) p/m/e
- Hundred Reasons - "Remmus" (EP) (2001) m
- My Vitriol - Finelines (2001) p/m
- Biffy Clyro - Blackened Sky (2002) p/m
- Sandstone Veterans - "Didn't Feel A Thing" (single) (2001) m
- Motor Ace - Shoot This (2002) p/m
- Therapy? - High Anxiety (2003) m
- 3 Colours Red - "Repeat To Fade" (single) (2003) p/m
- Biffy Clyro - The Vertigo Of Bliss (2003) p/m
- Oceansize - Effloresce (2003) p/m
- Amplifier - Amplifier (2004) m
- X Is Loaded - Raw Nerve (2004) p/m
- Biffy Clyro - Infinity Land (2004) p/m
- Oceansize - "Music for Nurses" (EP) (2004) p/m
- No Hope In New Jersey - Steady Diet Of Decline (2005) p
- Agent Blue - A Stolen Honda Vision (2005) p
- Reuben - Very Fast Very Dangerous (2005) p/m
- Fono - Too Broken To Brake (2007) m
- The Mighty Roars - Swine and Cockerel (2007) m
- Garbage - "Push It" (2007) remix
- Kisschasy - Hymns for the Nonbeliever (2007) p/m
- Oceansize - Frames (2007) p/m
- Johnny Panic - "The Good Fight" (2007) m
- Slaves To Gravity - "Scatter The Crow" (2008) m
- Atomic Garden - Little Stories about Potential Events (2008) m
- Brigade - Come Morning We Fight (2008) p/m
- CloverSeeds - Innocence (2008) m
- Sucioperro - Pain Agency (2008) m
- Plain - "Different not Strange" (2008) m
- The Boxer Rebellion - Union (2009) m
- Gren - Gren (2009) m
- Fightstar - Grand Unification
- Kieran Leonard - "Scapegoat" (EP) (2009) m
- Isola - "Gravity" (Single) (2009) m

=== 2010s ===
- Oceansize - "Self Preserved While the Bodies Float Up" (2010) m
- Sucioperro - "The Heart String & How To Pull It" (2010) m
- Mor ve Ötesi - "Masumiyetin Ziyan Olmaz" (2010) p/m
- Skunk Anansie - "Wonderlustre" (2010) m
- Amplifier - "The Octopus" (2011) m
- The King Blues - "Punk & Poetry" (2011) m
- Johnny Panic - "Ritual Riots" (2011) m
- Don Broco - "Priorities" (2012) m
- Amplifier - "Echo Street" (2013) m
- Keaton Henson - "Kronos" (2013) m
- Heaven's Basement - "Filthy Empire" (2013) m
- The Xcerts - "There Is Only You" (2014) m
- Lotus Crush - "Rabbit Hole" (2015) m
- Drenge - "Woods" & "Running Wild" (2015) m
- Bloc Party - "The Good News" (2015) m
- Bloc Party - "Virtue" (2016) m
- Bayside - "Vacancy" (2016) m
- Raglans - "Again & Again EP" (2016) m
- Feeder - "All Bright Electric" (2016) m
- The Rock Alchemist - "Elements" (2017) m
- The Xcerts - "Hold On to Your Heart" (2018) m
- Therapy? - "Cleave" (2018) p/m/e
- Michael Hutchence - "Spill the Wine" (2019) m
- Wildwood Kin - "Wildwood Kin" (2019) m
- Feeder - "Tallulah" (2019) m
- Rocketman - "Music from the Motion Picture" (2019) m

=== 2020s ===
- Therapy? - “Greatest Hits (Abbey Road)” (2020) m/e
- Shed Seven - “Another Night, Another Town (Live)” (2020) m
- The Rocket Dolls - “The Art of Disconnect” (2020) m
- Del Amitri - “You Can’t Go Back” (2021) – m
- Mason Hill - Against The Wall” (2021) – m
- Pattern Pusher - “Happy Place” (2021) – m
- Bad Touch - “25 Miles” (2021) – p/m
- Laurence Jones - “Destination Unknown” (2022) m
- Just A Ride - “Just A Ride” (2022) m
- The D/A Method - “Sanctuary” (2022) m
- Tom Fletcher - “Space Band” (2022) m
- Feeder - "Torpedo" (2022) m
- McFly - “Power To Play” (2023) m
- Obey Robots - “One In A Thousand” (2023) m
- Laurence Jones - “Bad Luck and The Blues” (2023) m
- Therapy? - "Hard Cold Fire" (2023) p/m
- Feeder - "Black/Red” (2024) m
- Back To Black - “Film music” (2024) m/e
- Shed Seven - “Liquid Gold” (2024) m
- Chasing Wins - “Break Expectations” (2025) m
