= Brigade (band) =

British alternative rock band

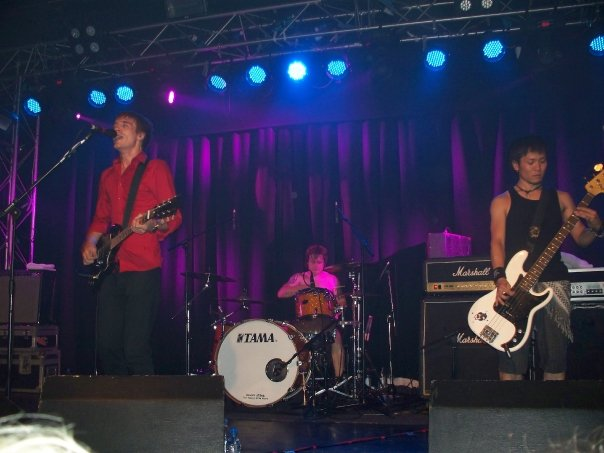
- Brigade performing in 2008 (left to right): Simpson, Kearton, Hori

Background information
- Origin: London, England
- Genres: Alternative rock; post-hardcore
- Years active: 2003–2011; 2016–present
- Labels: Mighty Atom; Roadrunner
- Members: Will Simpson; James Plant; Nathaniel Finbow; Alex Baker; Mark Fisher
- Past members: Naoto Hori; Andrew Kearton; Jumpei Hirano
- Website: www.brigadeofficial.com

Brigade are a British alternative rock band from London, England, formed in 2003. The original four-piece lineup consisted of lead vocalist and rhythm guitarist Will Simpson, lead guitarist and backing vocalist James Plant, bassist Naoto Hori, and drummer Andrew Kearton.

To date Brigade have released two extended plays and four studio albums. The band have toured with such UK bands as Biffy Clyro, Fightstar, InMe, Hell Is For Heroes and Busted, and US bands including Hidden in Plain View, Aiden and Kill Hannah.

== Origins ==
Brigade came together in 2003. Early gigs saw them win a "Battle of The Bands" competition at the Emergenza festival at the West One Four venue in West Kensington during May 2004. Their 'Safe Hands' demo gained the quartet significant interest in rock circles and in support, the quartet have been constantly touring the UK to build up a strong fanbase.

Brigade released their debut EP, "Made to Wreck", on 12 September 2005. To support the release of this EP, they toured with many bands; one of which was Fightstar, whose frontman (Charlie Simpson) is Will's younger brother.

Brigade went back into the studio during early November 2005 to put the finishing touches on their debut album. It was subsequently produced and mixed by Joe Gibb and co-produced by Gethin Woolcock. The band finished their debut album by November 2005.

== Lights ==
Brigade began 2006 with a UK tour supporting Fightstar. Following this, the band embarked on a UK Tour throughout April and May 2006, the April dates co-headlining with Northern Irish band Fighting With Wire. Brigade released their debut album "Lights" on 29 May 2006 in the UK. "Lights" received impressive reviews from the press receiving 8/10 from NME, 4/5 from Kerrang! and 8/10 from Rock Sound.

The band's first single, "Magneto" was released on 5 May 2006 in the UK. It charted at number 134 in the UK top 200, number 9 in the Indie Chart and reached No.3 in the Rock Chart. It was released in support of and 2 weeks before "Lights". The band embarked on a tour of Ireland in July 2006. Their second single, "Meet Me at My Funeral" was released on 21 August 2006, achieving No. 4 in the UK rock chart. The music video for which had been shot in Canvey Island. Following the release of their second single, Brigade went on a co-headlining tour with Disco Ensemble as well as supporting Hawthorne Heights at their London show.

Kerrang announced in October 2006 that they were to include the Brigade song "Queenie" on their "New Breed" CD for 2006. Brigade embarked on a tour of the UK with InMe in October 2006. The tour diary was available on Brigade's Blog on their Myspace site. In support of the tour, Brigade released a video for their third single from "Lights". The video was for the song "Guillotine" and was available to see on the Sky music channel Scuzz. The video for "Guillotine" was shot at a pub near London Bridge with ex-Hollyoaks star Elise Du Toit, Andrew Howard and Matt Berry (Mighty Boosh, Garth Marenghi). All 3 music videos are still available to stream on Mighty Atom's website. "Lights" was also re-released on 30 October 2006. The re-release included a second CD including promo videos for the songs "Magneto", "Meet Me at My Funeral" and "Go Slow" as well as having some live videos of the band. During December 2006, Brigade supported Minus The Bear at the Islington Academy.

In 2006, Brigade were nominated for Best British Newcomer at the Kerrang! Awards but ultimately lost out to Bring Me The Horizon. In early 2007, "Lights" was voted into the "Top 10 Albums of 2006" in the Rock Sound Readers' Poll.

== Come Morning We Fight ==
The Band prepared to record their second album during early 2007. A new demo of a song called "Yes It Is" was made available to listen to on their website. Throughout early 2007, the band also put up two more demos, "Res Head" (premiered live on one of their previous tours) and "Asinine" (also premiered as Untitled No. 3). Throughout February 2007, the band toured with Hell is For Heroes on their UK Tour. The band planned to perform new material at the Camden Purple Turtle, in April 2007. On 21 May 2007 Fim announced he was leaving the band and was replaced by June by Andrew Kearton (ex- Bassknives).

On 2 December 2007 it was confirmed that Brigade had set up camp and were recording the second album at Monnow Valley Studios in Wales. Chris Sheldon (Reuben, Oceansize, Biffy Clyro) took on the Producing and Mixing duties. The band finished recording two songs in the first full week of recording and hoped to get the album out early 2008. Video diaries and photos from the studio were made available on the band's MySpace page.

On 16 January 2008, through their MySpace site, Brigade announced the title of their second album to be Come Morning We Fight. Although an exact release date wasn't given, the band did announce the album would be released in the spring. They also announced that they would be releasing a download only single on 25 February 2008 called "Shortcuts".

On 5 February 2008, the band put up in a MySpace blog, pictures from the latest music video they had been shooting. The band announced the video was for the first single from "Come Morning, We Fight", called "Pilot".

On 25 February "Shortcuts" was made available to download for free from the band's website. It was also put on the band's MySpace site, along with clips of new songs "Pilot" and "Slow Dives And Alibis".

The video for "Pilot" debuted on MTV2 in the UK Rock Chart during April, with the single release on 5 May and the album "Come Morning We Fight" followed on 12 May. The band embarked with Fightstar and We Are The Ocean on the Ride The Deathcar tour during May to promote the release of their second album. Brigade also supported Aiden on their UK tour alongside Kill Hannah and Serpico.

During early June 2008, it was announced that the band was to embark on a headlining tour of the UK, supported by Slaves to Gravity. During late June, the band announced the release of a double A-side single of "Sink Sink Swim/Stunning", to be released on 4 August 2008. The release was limited to 500 CDs. Music Videos for the 2 songs were shot during June 2008. Beforehand the band played several warm up shows with Kill Hannah in preparation for their appearance at the 2008 Download Festival, of which they performed on the Gibson Stage. In late 2008, the band announced they were to complete a mini tour of Japan. Brigade ended the year by being voted the "Most Underrated Band of 2008" by the readers of Rock Sound.

== Will Be Will Be & Love Is A Duel EP ==
During late 2008 the band announced they were gathering together ideas for their third album.

In early 2009, the band found that their song "Together Apart", from Come Morning We Fight had been used in a Portuguese Beer advert. This followed an opportunity the band had to play a gig during the last gigs to be held at the London Astoria on 14 January before the club closed its doors for the last time.

On 2 March 2009 the band announced that it had signed a record deal with Roadrunner Records in Japan to release their 2nd album, Come Morning We Fight on 13 May 2009. The band made an appearance at the Hinterland Festival in Glasgow, Scotland through 30 April - 1 May 2009.

In August 2009, the band announced plans for a 6th Anniversary show at The Bull & Gate in London on 29 September 2009. The band continued to write for their third album, penning 11 new songs. They started demoing and pre-production once bass player Naoto Hori had returned from Japan, after having an operation on his back following an injury from doing removal work. Working titles for new songs include "Tiny Pieces", "Eden", "Love is a Duel", "Adieu", "Coat in Bruise", "200 Scratches", "It's a mess, if it ain't it'll do till a mess gets here", "Little Perisher", and "Press The Six".

On 4 October 2010 the band announced they were to record their third album in conjunction with PledgeMusic, and in so doing allowing the fans to help fund the recording of the album, and offering diverse packages from signed T-shirts and CDs to signed guitars. Having met their target, the band recorded their third album in early 2011. Before this, the band released a new EP, Love Is A Duel, which was released free with Rocksound magazine on 10 November 2010. On 10 November 2010 a music video for first single from the new EP, "Camouflet" was released through the Rocksound website.

The band announced through Pledgemusic on 9 May 2011 that their third album was to be called "Will Be Will Be". The album itself was subsequently finished and released for download through Pledgemusic on 31 May 2011 and received a wider release in the autumn of 2011.

In mid-October 2011, through a video posting on the band's Facebook page, it was announced that Naoto Hori had quit the band at the end of the summer of 2011. For the tour at the end of 2011, a musician called Alex Baker covered on bass. The band also announced the tour booked for 2011 would be their last nationwide, headlining tour for the foreseeable future, the main reason being the difficulty in balancing full-time jobs with managing the band and booking the tours themselves. It was stressed that Brigade are not breaking up, will continue to do occasional live shows and record, but large-scale touring was not on the agenda. In 2016 the band announced that the original lineup would be reuniting for a one-off show, to celebrate 10 years since the release of Lights.

== Reunion & new music ==
In December 2017, the band posted in their social media pages that they are playing a co-headline show at the O2 Academy Islington with Slaves to Gravity to celebrate 10 years since the release of Come Morning We Fight. In January 2018, the band announced they are also playing Camden Rocks in June.

In February 2018, the band teased they were giving a big announcement, which later in the day revealed they were putting out new music. A few days later, they posted a 14-second clip of a new song called Whites to be part of their upcoming EP.

== Members ==
Current members

- Will Simpson – lead vocals, rhythm guitar (2003–2011, 2016–present)
- James Plant – lead guitar, vocals (2003–2011, 2016–present)
- Alex Baker – bass guitar (2011, 2016–present)
- Nathaniel Finbow – drums, percussion (2004–2007, 2016–present)
- Mark Fisher – guitar (2016–present)

Past members

- Andrew Kearton – drums, percussion (2007–2011)
- Jumpei Hirano – drums, percussion (2011)
- Naoto Hori – bass guitar (2003–2011)

== Record labels ==
UK

- Mighty Atom Records (2005–2007)
- Caned & Able (2008–2011)

Japan

- Roadrunner Records (2009–2011)

== Discography ==
=== Demos ===
Title
"Early Sessions Demo"
Acoustic CD
"Safe Hands Demo"

=== EPs ===
Title	Release date	Label
Made to Wreck	12 September 2005	Mighty Atom
Love Is A Duel	10 November 2010	Homespun Records
This Is Not For You	6 April 2018	Homespun Records

=== Albums ===
Title	Release date	Label
Lights	29 May 2006	Mighty Atom
Come Morning We Fight	12 May 2008	Caned & Able
Will Be Will Be	31 May 2011	Mighty Atom
Dissonance	13 May 2022	Homespun Records

=== Singles ===
Year	Title	Chart Positions			Album
Year	Title	UK Singles Chart	UK Rock Chart	UK Indie Chart	Album
2006	"Magneto"	134	3	9	Lights
2006	"Meet Me at My Funeral"	-	4	17	Lights
2006	"Guillotine"	-	-	23	Lights
2008	"Pilot"	-	-	-	Come Morning We Fight
2008	"Sink, Sink, Swim"/"Stunning"	-	-	-	Come Morning We Fight
2010	"Camouflet"	-	-	-	Love Is A Duel

=== Music videos ===
Year	Title	Director
2006	"Magneto"	Rod Thomas
2006	"Meet Me at My Funeral"	Rod Thomas
2006	"Guillotine"	Adam Mason
2008	"Pilot"	Nick Bartleet
2008	"Sink, Sink, Swim"	Nick Bartleet
2008	"Stunning"	Nick Bartleet
2010	"Camouflet"	Rod Thomas
