= Serpico (disambiguation) =

Serpico is a film based on Frank Serpico

Serpico also may refer to:

- Topics related to the police officer who inspired the film:
  - Frank Serpico, New York Police Department officer
  - Serpico, a biography of Frank Serpico by Peter Maas
  - Serpico (TV series), the television series based on Serpico's life and the film
- Serpico, a fictional character in Berserk (manga)
- Sérpico, an alias of Argentine naval officer Ricardo Miguel Cavallo
- Serpico (band), Scottish metal band
- Serpico (surname), a list of people with the surname
