= Amputee EP =

EP by Oceansize
- Released: 1999
- Genre: New prog
- Length: 28:54
- Producer: Oceansize

Oceansize chronology
Amputee EP (1999)	A Very Still Movement EP (2001)

Amputee EP is the first release by British rock band Oceansize, released in 1999. It features early recordings of the songs "Amputee" and "Saturday Morning Breakfast Show," which were later featured on the album Effloresce. The song "Heaven Alive" was re-recorded for Everyone Into Position, and "Ebb" was re-recorded as "Relapse" for the Relapse (EP).

== Track listing ==
1. Amputee - 5:29
2. Saturday Morning Breakfast Show - 7:37
3. Ebb - 11:05
4. Heaven Alive - 4:47

== Personnel ==
- Mike Vennart - guitar, lead vocals
- Steve Durose - guitar, backing vocals
- Richard "Gambler" Ingram - guitar, keyboards
- Jon Ellis - bass
- Mark Heron - drums
