= Home & Minor =

Home and Minor

EP by Oceansize
- Released: 26 October 2009
- Recorded: Summer 2009 (completed 12 August)
- Genres: New prog, post-rock, indie rock, experimental rock
- Label: Superball Music
- Producer: Oceansize

Oceansize chronology
Frames (2007)	Home and Minor (2009)	Self Preserved While the Bodies Float Up (2010)

Professional ratings
Review scores
Source	Rating
Rock Sound	8/10
Shred News	10/10

Home & Minor is an EP by Manchester-based alternative rock band Oceansize, released on 26 October 2009 on Superball Music. The release is limited to 3000 copies. Regarding the EP, vocalist and guitarist Mike Vennart states, "we thought we’d try and make a mini-album of more reserved songs that have something in common with each other. It's our acoustic-like record, only there are no acoustic instruments and it’s not an album!"

== Background and information ==
According to the band, the EP is

a collection of our more 'settled' numbers. More reserved, with not a distortion pedal in sight, this lovely EP is a realisation of a plan that's been kicking around our collective brains since before we were signed in 2002. Where in the past we've crowbarred-in every single dynamic, idea and style we could think of into a record, we thought it best this time to present a more thematic and cohesive collection, so's not to disrupt the more fainted-hearted listener from their blub-induced slumber. Still, it covers plenty of ground, and features a fair few Oceansize firsts such as trumpets, pedal-steel guitar as well as a bit of pumping techno and some additional vocals from Kate Ray. It is also the first Oceansize record to be made in our own as-yet-unnamed studio in Manchester.

In an interview with Rock Sound, Vennart elaborated on the stylistic approach of the record, describing the track "Legal Teens" as "a weird, sci-fi, cocktail tune."

== Track listing ==
Music by Oceansize. Lyrics by Mike Vennart.

1. "Legal Teens" - 4:28
2. "Getting Where Water Cannot" - 5:24
3. "Monodrones" - 2:34
4. "Home & Minor" - 8:10
5. "Didnaeland" - 3:22
6. "The Strand" - 8:04

== Personnel ==
The following people contributed to Home & Minor:

Oceansize

- Steve Durose - guitar, backing vocals
- Richard "Gambler" Ingram - guitar, keyboards
- Mark Heron - drums, percussion
- Steven Hodson - bass, keyboards
- Mike Vennart - lead vocals, guitar

Additional musicians

- Tom Knott - trumpet
- Norman McLeod - pedal steel guitar
- Kate Ray - vocals

Recording personnel

- Oceansize - recording, producer
- Chris Sheldon - mixing
- Sean Magee - mastering

Artwork

- Steven Hodson - artwork, layout
- Adam Crosby - cover photograph
