= The Flood Inside =

Studio album by Long Distance Calling
- Released: 4 March 2013
- Genre: Progressive rock
- Length: 55:23
- Label: Superball Music

Long Distance Calling chronology
Long Distance Calling (2011)	The Flood Inside (2013)	Trips (2016)

The Flood Inside is the fourth studio album by German post-rock/post-metal/progressive rock band Long Distance Calling. It was released on 4 March 2013, through Superball Music and reached No. 33 in the German charts. It is the first album to have a set vocalist (Martin "Marsen" Fischer) and features vocals on four of the eight tracks. The song "Welcome Change" features guest vocals from Norway singer/songwriter Petter Carlsen and Anathema's frontman Vincent Cavanagh.

== Track listing ==
No.	Title	Music	Length
1.	"Nucleus"	Long Distance Calling	7:13
2.	"Inside the Flood"	Long Distance Calling	6:43
3.	"Ductus"	Long Distance Calling	6:48
4.	"Tell the End"	Long Distance Calling	6:02
5.	"Welcome Change"	Long Distance Calling	7:09
6.	"Waves"	Long Distance Calling	6:39
7.	"The Man Within"	Long Distance Calling	6:35
8.	"Breaker"	Long Distance Calling	8:14
Total length:			55:23

== Personnel ==
- David Jordan – guitar
- Janosch Rathmer – drums
- Florian Füntmann – guitar
- Jan Hoffmann – bass
- Martin Fischer – vocals and sounds

== Reception ==
The change to include a vocalist and the album in general were very well received, with positive reviews from EMP, Metal Hammer, and Metal Revolution among others, Metal Hammer referring to the new vocalist as "vocally capable of adding an extra dimension, musically".
