= Long Distance Calling =

Long Distance Calling may refer to:

- Long-distance calling
- Long Distance Calling (band), a German band
  - Long Distance Calling (album), a 2011 self-titled album from the band
