= Long Distance Call (disambiguation) =

"Long Distance Call" is an episode on the 1959 television series The Twilight Zone.

Long Distance Call can also refer to:

- "Long Distance Call" (Supernatural), an episode of the American television series Supernatural
- "Long Distance Call" (song), a 1951 song by Muddy Waters
- "Long Distance Call", a 2006 single by Phoenix, from the album It's Never Been Like That

== See also ==
- Long Distance Calling (disambiguation)
