= Avoid the Light =

Studio album by Long Distance Calling
- Released: 24 April 2009
- Recorded: November 2008, Tonstudio45 Koblenz
- Genres: Post-rock, post-metal
- Length: 54:52
- Label: Superball Music
- Producer: Kurt Ebelhäuser

Long Distance Calling chronology
Satellite Bay (2007)	Avoid the Light (2009)	Long Distance Calling (2011)

Avoid the Light (German: Meide das Licht) is the second studio album by the German post-rock/post-metal band Long Distance Calling. It was released on 24 April 2009 by Superball Music.

== Production ==
Avoid the Light was the first album of the band under the new label Superball Music, coming to an end with Viva Hate Records. Upon changing to Superball Music the band recorded a demo containing the song Apparitions which would later be featured in Avoid the Light. The remaining songs of the album were written during 2008, while writing songs for the Split-EP 090208 with the band Leech simultaneously.

The album was recorded in November 2008 in Tonstudio45 Koblenz. Avoid The Light was produced by Kurt Ebelhäuser and the band. The mastering took over Pascal Stoffels. The cover was designed by Tim Klockentiedt. The vocals on the song "The Nearing Grave" were done by guest vocalist Jonas Renkse of the Swedish band Katatonia, who also wrote the lyrics for the song.

== Background ==
The album title comes from a song by Pantera for the soundtrack of the film Dracula 2000. The band members were looking for an album title, and overheard the song playing on a Pantera CD while they were in a hotel.

The lack of a degree in the song "359°" intends to represent that nothing is perfect in life. "I Know You, Stanley Milgram" is based on the small-world phenomenon by the U.S. psychologist Stanley Milgram. The last song "Sundown Highway" was given its name by guitarist Florian Füntmann after hearing the finished song. In his opinion, the song conveys the feeling of meeting the sunset while driving on an isolated highway.

== Track listing ==
No.	Title	Music	Length
1.	"Apparitions"	Long Distance Calling	12:16
2.	"Black Paper Planes"	Long Distance Calling	7:17
3.	"359°"	Long Distance Calling	7:55
4.	"I Know You, Stanley Milgram"	Long Distance Calling	10:26
5.	"The Nearing Grave"	Jonas Renkse, Long Distance Calling	7:48
6.	"Sundown Highway"	Long Distance Calling	9:10
Total length:			54:52

== Reception ==
Avoid the Light was given very good reviews by the press. Christian K of the online magazine Metal.de said in his review "musical excellence, as far as the eye can see" and scored it a nine out of ten points.

For the critics of Werner Online Magazine in-your-face.de, Avoid the Light "is a very refreshing approach to music as an art form." The album was described as a "small masterpiece" and awarded nine out of ten points. Some negative comments came from the reviewer Claudio of the online magazine "sleaze metal", which said "the album is too complex and demanding for daily or long-term enjoyment" for what he awarded it a 6.5 out of ten points.
