= Come Morning We Fight =

Studio album by Brigade
- Released: 12 May 2008
- Recorded: December 2007 at Monnow Valley Studios, Monmouthshire, Wales
- Genre: Alternative rock, post-hardcore
- Length: 53:30
- Label: Caned & Able, Roadrunner
- Producer: Chris Sheldon

Brigade chronology
Lights (2006)	Come Morning We Fight (2008)	Will Be Will Be (2011)

Singles from Come Morning We Fight
- 1. "Pilot" Released: 28 April 2008; 2. "Sink Sink Swim/Stunning" Released: 4 August 2008

Professional ratings
Review scores
Source	Rating
Kerrang!	link
NME	(8/10)
Rock Sound	(9/10)
Sputnikmusic	link
The Music Magazine	(9/10) link

Come Morning We Fight is the second studio album by English alternative rock band Brigade, released on 12 May 2008 on Caned & Able Records.

The band had welcomed Andrew Kearton to join the band as their full-time drummer, and also hired Chris Sheldon (Oceansize, Biffy Clyro, Fightstar) to oversee mixing and producing duties. Brigade set up camp in Monnow Valley Studio's in December 2007 to record songs for their follow up album to Lights.

In early January 2008 Brigade announced that the title for their second album would be Come Morning We Fight. In February, Brigade announced that the first single to be taken off the album would be "Pilot". The full video can now be seen online and on major music video channels. "Pilot" was released on 28 April with the album official release date being on 12 May 2008. The Double A-side "Sink Sink Swim/Stunning" was then released on 4 August.

Rock Sound placed the album at #43 on their "Top 75 Albums of 2008".

== Track listing ==
All lyrics written by Will Simpson; all music composed by Brigade.

1. "What Are You Waiting For?" – 3:21
2. "Pilot" – 3:17
3. "Together Apart" – 3:34
4. "Res Head" – 3:15
5. "Stunning" – 2:53
6. "Slow Dives & Alibis" – 3:34
7. "Four Kids to a Glockenspiel" – 5:30
8. "Come Morning We Fight" (Instrumental) – 2:21
9. "Shortcuts" – 3:36
10. "Vice to Versa" – 3:30
11. "Asinine" – 5:17
12. "Sink Sink Swim" – 3:14
13. "Boundaries" – 10:18
  - contains an untitled hidden track

== Release history ==
Country	Date	Label
United Kingdom	12 May 2008	Caned & Able
Japan	13 May 2009	Roadrunner

== Personnel ==
The following personnel contributed to Come Morning We Fight:

=== Brigade ===
- Will Simpson – lead vocals, rhythm guitar
- James Plant – lead guitar, vocals
- Naoto Hori – bass guitar
- Andrew Kearton – drums, percussion

=== Additional musicians ===
- Guillermo 'Will' Mayer – string arrangement
- Chris Sheldon – keyboards, backing vocals
- Charlie Simpson – backing vocals
- Edd Simpson – backing vocals
- Tom Hodgkinson – backing vocals

=== Production ===
- Chris Sheldon – producer, mixing, engineering
- Steve Fallone – mastering
- Jim Anderson – assistant engineering, art direction, design
- Pete Derrett – photography
- Warren Higgins – A&R
