= Self Preserved While the Bodies Float Up =

Studio album by Oceansize
- Released: 3 September 2010
- Genres: New prog, post-rock, alternative rock
- Length: 51:19
- Label: Superball Music
- Producer: Oceansize

Oceansize chronology
Home and Minor EP (2009)	Self Preserved While the Bodies Float Up (2010)

Self Preserved While the Bodies Float Up is the fourth and final full-length studio album by the progressive/alternative rock band Oceansize. It was released in Germany, Austria, Switzerland on 3 September 2010, in the rest of Europe on 6 September 2010, and in North America on 14 September 2010 on Superball Music. It has received near unanimous acclaim from critics.

== Background ==
The band stated numerous times that they believed the album to be significantly heavier, and in an interview with The Goodbye Look, vocalist/guitarist Mike Vennart confirmed that the album would showcase the band's heavier side; "...the new album's a mixture for sure. There's plenty of heavy stuff, the heaviest we've ever done. But we still love playing the lush stuff. I can only think of a couple of bands I love who are strictly HEAVY ONLY. Slayer, for example. For the most part, I feel like some bands over-play their lack of subtlety and it just gets... a bit boring really. I dunno, I can feel more emotions than anger and energy, so I expect my music to reflect that.". Vennart also stated that he is very proud of the effort, saying "I can honestly say that I haven't been so excited about a record since 'Everyone Into Position' which I was incredibly proud of when we made it. I'm not necessarily trying to build anticipation for the record, moreover I just want people to know it's coming and that we love it!".

Earlier in the year, guitarist/keyboardist Gambler elaborated on the direction of the album; "A while ago I posted a statement on our website saying that the new album will be “fifteen songs, all under four minutes.” This was obviously a joke, but it's not so far from the truth. Most of the songs are shorter, more concise. We didn't set out to write shorter songs, it just happened; we didn't feel the need to drag them out and elaborate on them any further than necessary. I think we’ve been tarred with the ‘oh-they-write-long-proggy-songs’ brush so I think a few people will be quite surprised."

Vennart attempted to describe the sound of the new album in January 2010, saying "In the most part it's a bit shorter, it's mainly heavier, there's one tune that we're just practising at the moment that is just the fucking loudest, most obnoxious, sludgy, horrible, heaviest thing we've ever done. I'm really looking forward to presenting that, it's going to be unbearable, that'll be quite interesting. I've never heard anything quite like it, so I don't quite know how people are going to take to it, it's not particularly catchy. It'll be good." He added that "Gambler is playing a little bit of keyboards in here or there. On the last album, 'Frames', Gambler's playing keyboards on virtually everything, so I think he's trying to keep that to a minimum this time. There's some stuff that's the fastest, most frantic stuff that we've ever done. The strange thing is that with every album that we do, we try to do something different and keep everybody on their toes, just to keep things interesting for us as well as the audience, but the thing is, it's really hard to change what you sound like. You can bring in all these strange influences and get introduced to all kinds of new music that can instigate fresh ideas but at the same time you're still going to sound like your band."

The album was recorded at the band's self-funded studio in Manchester, while the mixing was completed at Abbey Road Studios by Sean Magee.

The special edition of the album comes with the b-side Cloak (aka Tough Cookie), as well as a detailed, 40-page booklet, while the vinyl edition of the album comes in a gatefold sleeve with all the lyrics as well as a copy of the entire album on CD.

== Reception ==
Professional ratings
Aggregate scores
Source	Rating
AnyDecentMusic?	8.0/10
Review scores
Source	Rating
AllMusic	3.5/5 stars
BBC	(Positive)
Drowned in Sound	8/10
NME	8/10
Rock Sound	9/10 stars
Sputnikmusic	4/5 stars

TheNewReview.net gave the album a glowing review, stating that "Self Preserved While the Bodies Float Up finds Oceansize scaling back the grandiose in favour of more streamlined, accessible material and the music presented is all the better because of these alterations.... emotions are more exposed, variation is better explored, and the songwriting is increasingly dynamic on the group’s fourth and latest release... Self Preserved..., finds the group maintaining their hearty artisanship and at the same time trimming the excess fat, making their fourth full length release arguably their finest record yet...Pine serves as the final highlight to an album chock full of sensational songwriting...Without a doubt, Pine is one of the most remarkable compositions Oceansize have put to tape. Rock Sound has also been effusive rating it 9/10 and calling it "Surely one of the finest records of 2010." Review Aggregator AnyDecentMusic? correlated 9 reviews resulting in an ADM Rating of 8.0. This resulted in the album becoming an ADM Chart Topper, and is currently fourth in the site's All Time Top 10.

== Track listing ==
All music written by Oceansize, lyrics by Mike Vennart

No.	Title	Length
1.	"Part Cardiac"	4:10
2.	"SuperImposer"	4:15
3.	"Build Us a Rocket Then..."	3:59
4.	"Oscar Acceptance Speech"	8:54
5.	"Ransoms"	4:07
6.	"A Penny's Weight"	3:38
7.	"Silent/Transparent"	8:29
8.	"It's My Tail and I'll Chase It If I Want To"	3:36
9.	"Pine"	4:55
10.	"SuperImposter"	5:16
11.	"Cloak" (only on special edition)	3:39

== Personnel ==
The following people contributed to Self Preserved While The Bodies Float Up: Oceansize

- Mike Vennart – Vocals, Guitar, Bass
- Steve Durose – Guitar, Backing Vocals
- Steven Hodson – Bass, Keyboards, Guitar
- Gambler – Guitar, Keyboards
- Mark Heron – Drums, Drums, Drums, Percussion

Additional musicians

- Claire Lemmon – Backing Vocals on SuperImposer and A Penny's Weight
- Simon Neil – Backing Vocals on It's My Tail And I'll Chase It If I Want To
- Semay Wu – Cello
- Helen Tonge – Violin

Recording personnel and artwork

- Oceansize – Producing
- Steve Durose – Engineering (primarily, "everyone did a bit here and there")
- Chris Sheldon – Mixing
- Sean Magee – Mastering
- Tommy Davidson – Artwork

== Charts ==
Chart performance for Self Preserved While the Bodies Float Up
Chart (2025)	Peak position
Australian Albums (ARIA)	6
UK Independent Albums Breakers (OCC)	18
UK Physical Albums (OCC)	100
