= A Very Still Movement EP =

A Very Still Movement

EP by Oceansize
- Released: 12 August 2001
- Recorded: 2000–2001
- Genre: New prog
- Label: Soviet Union
- Producer: Sel Balamir

Oceansize chronology
Amputee EP (2000)	A Very Still Movement (2001)	Relapse EP (2002)

Professional ratings
Review scores
Source	Rating
Drowned in Sound	10/10

A Very Still Movement is an EP by British rock band Oceansize, released in August 2001 on the record label Soviet Union. The tracks "Catalyst" and "Women Who Have Men Who Love Drugs" were re-recorded for the band's debut Effloresce. The EP was produced and mixed by Sel Balamir, singer and guitarist of Amplifier. Balamir is also featured in the last track, "Sizeofanocean".

== Track listing ==
1. "Catalyst" – 6:51
2. "A Very Still Movement" – 3:26
3. "Women Who Love Men Who Love Drugs" – 9:22
4. "Sizeofanocean" – 5:19

== Personnel ==
- Mike Vennart – guitar, vocals
- Steve Durose – guitar, backing vocals
- Gambler – guitar, keyboards
- Jon Ellis – bass
- Mark Heron – drums
- Sel Balamir – additional guitar and backing vocals on "Sizeofanocean"
