= Dig for Fire =

1990 single by Pixies

Single by Pixies

from the album Bossanova
- B-side: "Velvety Instrumental Version"; "Winterlong"; "Santo"
- Released: November 5, 1990
- Recorded: 1989 – 1990
- Studio: Cherokee, Hollywood; Hansa, Berlin
- Genre: Alternative rock
- Length: 2:51
- Label: 4AD/Elektra
- Songwriter: Black Francis
- Producers: Gil Norton, Chris Sheldon

Pixies singles chronology
| "Velouria" (1990) | "Dig for Fire" (1990) | "Planet of Sound" (1991) |

Audio sample
- file; help

"Dig for Fire" is a song by the American alternative rock band Pixies from their third studio album Bossanova (1990) and was released as a single on November 5, 1990.

== Background ==
"Dig for Fire" was one of the few songs on Bossanova that Francis had written prior to coming into the studio. According to Pixies frontman Black Francis, the song was "a bad Talking Heads imitation."

Producer Gil Norton said of the song, "'Dig for Fire' was the first time we used a drum machine. The bass drum on that is a drum machine and Dave [Lovering] played on top of it. That was the first time we'd ever used any sample-type sounds on the album."

== Release ==
"Dig for Fire" was released as the second single from Bossanova (1990) on November 5, 1990. Among the B-sides was a version of Neil Young's "Winterlong." "Dig for Fire" reached number 11 on the US Modern Rock Tracks chart and number 62 in the UK.

The single version of "Dig for Fire" is mixed differently from the album version and also contains some overdubs.

== Music video ==
The song was promoted with a music video that also featured another Bossanova track, the brief "Allison", a tribute to jazz musician Mose Allison. The combination of the two songs was a compromise, as Elektra wanted a video for "Dig for Fire," while Francis, in calling the song a "bad Talking Heads imitation," pushed for "Allison" instead.

The video featured the band riding in motorcycle sidecars during "Dig for Fire," only to cut to the band performing "Allison" live on the field of Amsterdam's Olympisch Stadion.

== Track listing ==
All songs written by Black Francis, except where noted.

1. "Dig for Fire" – 2:51
2. "Velvety Instrumental Version" – 2:04
3. "Winterlong" (Neil Young) – 3:07
4. "Santo" – 2:16

== Charts ==
| Chart (1990–91) | Peak position |
|---|---|
| Ireland (IRMA) | 27 |
| UK Singles (OCC) | 62 |
| US Alternative Airplay (Billboard) | 11 |
