= Relapse (EP) =

EP by Oceansize
- Released: 21 October 2002
- Studio: The Work
- Genre: New prog
- Length: 22:17
- Label: Beggars Banquet
- Producer: Tim Smith

Oceansize chronology
A Very Still Movement EP (2001)	Relapse (2002)	Effloresce (2003)

Professional ratings
Review scores
Source	Rating
Drowned in Sound	(9/10) link

Relapse is an EP by British rock band Oceansize, released in October 2002 on Beggars Banquet Records. It was produced by Tim Smith of the band Cardiacs, and Sel Balamir of the band Amplifier contributed to mixing. Two of the EP's tracks, "Amputee" and "You Wish", were re-recorded in 2003 for Effloresce. An earlier version of "Relapse" appeared as "Ebb" on the Amputee EP.

== Track listing ==
1. "Amputee" – 5:08
2. "Relapse" – 10:14
3. "You Wish" – 6:55

== Personnel ==
Technical

- Tim Smith – producer
- Elliot James – recording, engineer, mixing
- Sel Balamir – mixing
- Oceansize – mixing

Artwork

- Tina McClelland – photographs
