= Robin Finck =

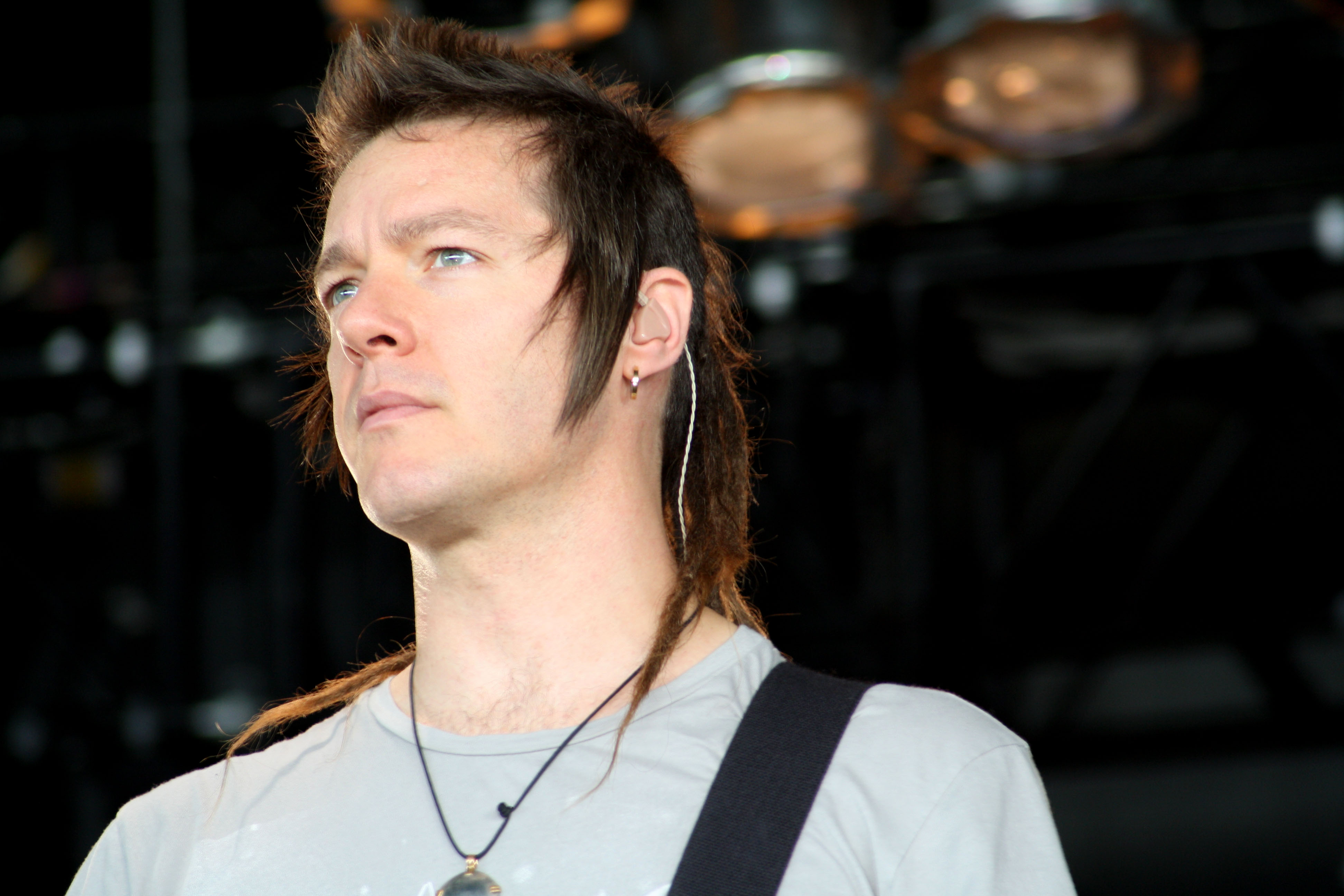
- Finck performing with Nine Inch Nails in 2009

Background information
- Born: Robert John Finck; November 7, 1971 (age 54); Park Ridge, New Jersey, U.S.
- Genres: Industrial rock; industrial metal; alternative rock; hard rock; heavy metal
- Occupations: Musician; songwriter
- Instrument: Guitar
- Years active: 1993–present
- Labels: Geffen; Interscope; Nothing; The Null Corporation
- Member of: Nine Inch Nails
- Formerly of: Guns N' Roses
- Website: robinfinck.com

Robert John "Robin" Finck (born November 7, 1971) is an American guitarist. Finck is the longest-serving touring musician for Nine Inch Nails, performing with the band from 1994 to 2000, and returning in 2008. With Nine Inch Nails, Finck contributed studio performances on The Slip (2008).

Finck also was an official member of Guns N' Roses from 1997 through 2008. With Guns N’ Roses, Finck wrote and recorded on the long-delayed Chinese Democracy (2008), notably co-writing the song "Better".

In 2020, Finck was inducted into the Rock and Roll Hall of Fame as a member of Nine Inch Nails.

== Career ==
Finck grew up in Marietta, Georgia and played with several unsigned bands based primarily in the Atlanta area, including acts such as Prowess, Bat Your Lashes, Sik Dik (bandmates of which included Steve "Holiday" Childress and Michael Allen, currently of The Goodies and Greg Thum), and The Hookers.

He joined Nine Inch Nails as part of their touring band in 1994–95 for their Self-Destruct and Further Down the Spiral tours following the departure of previous guitarist Richard Patrick. Finck appeared with Nine Inch Nails at Woodstock '94, and saw his first official release with them, the "Closer to God" single, released in 1994. Once the tour was completed, he took a job playing for the circus troupe Cirque du Soleil in the original tour of Quidam. In 1997 Finck signed a two-year contract with Guns N' Roses as the replacement for Slash (who had quit the band at the end of the previous year) and began work on what was ultimately to become the band's long delayed album Chinese Democracy. When the two years were up the album had not been completed, although the song "Oh My God" was released on the End of Days soundtrack. Whether or not Finck played on the song is in dispute; GNR vocalist Axl Rose says he did while Finck himself says he did not.

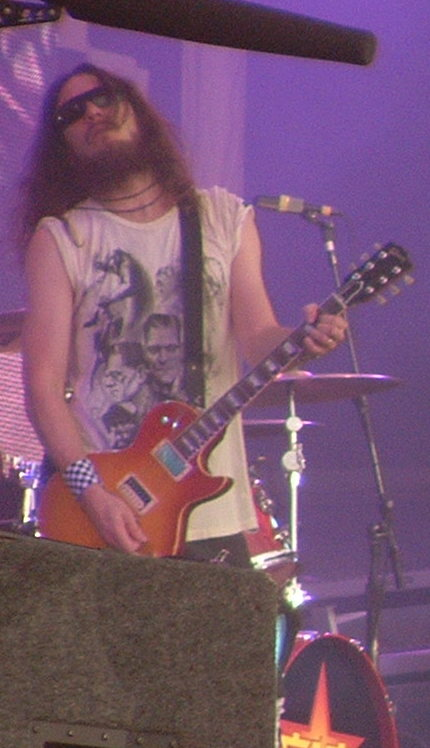
Finck playing with Guns N' Roses in 2006

Finck rejoined Nine Inch Nails as the band embarked on their Fragility v1.0 and Fragility v2.0 tours in support of the 1999 album The Fragile. These tours were recorded and released as the live album/DVD, And All That Could Have Been. He also played on a studio-recorded version of "The Day the World Went Away" on the companion album Still, which was included with the deluxe version of And All That Could Have Been and later made available as a standalone CD through nin.com. Shortly after the tour ended in 2000 he returned to Guns N' Roses, playing four shows with them in late 2001 followed by a brief tour of Europe and Asia in mid-2002 and a live appearance at the MTV Video Music Awards. A planned US tour was meant to continue through the remainder of 2002 but was called off by the promoter after two cancelled shows led to rioting by fans. Around this time Finck and then-bandmate Buckethead contributed to the soundtrack of the John Carpenter movie Ghosts of Mars, playing alongside members of thrash metal group Anthrax and guitar virtuoso Steve Vai. After his touring obligations with GNR were fulfilled he joined the LedZAerial production (a performance by acrobats set to the music of the band Led Zeppelin).

Finck was invited to rejoin NIN to tour in support of their 2005 album With Teeth but chose not to and the position was filled by Aaron North. In the summer of 2006, he toured Europe with Guns N' Roses playing in front of over 700,000 people. They finished up by touring North America for the remainder of the year, and went to Mexico, Australia, New Zealand and Japan in 2007.

On April 4, 2008, it was announced via nin.com that Finck would be rejoining Nine Inch Nails as a member of the live band. He subsequently contributed to the Nine Inch Nails album The Slip, earning a performance credit alongside then-band members Josh Freese and Alessandro Cortini.

In November 2008 Guns N' Roses' long-awaited album Chinese Democracy was released. Finck has a co-writing credit on the song "Better", which was later released as a single, as well as 7 other songs on the album. He also played guitar on every track, performed 7 of the guitar solos and has additional credits for keyboards, arrangements and pre-production. He chose to remain with NIN after the album's release and, on March 21, 2009, was officially replaced as the lead guitarist of Guns N' Roses by Sixx:A.M. guitarist DJ Ashba. The official Guns N' Roses website stated that "Robin continues to be part of GN'R, by virtue of Guns' history and his involvement in Chinese Democracy".

Following the departure of NIN live band members Alessandro Cortini and Josh Freese at the end of 2008 Finck and bassist Justin Meldal-Johnsen re-grouped with band leader Trent Reznor and new drummer Ilan Rubin and the 4-piece band completed an 8-date tour of Australia and New Zealand between February and March 2009. Finck continued to perform with the band throughout the 2009 Nine Inch Nails/Jane's Addiction (NIN|JA) tour, with shows throughout North America, and the subsequent Wave Goodbye tour through Europe and Asia. The band then returned to the US to play a series of shows.

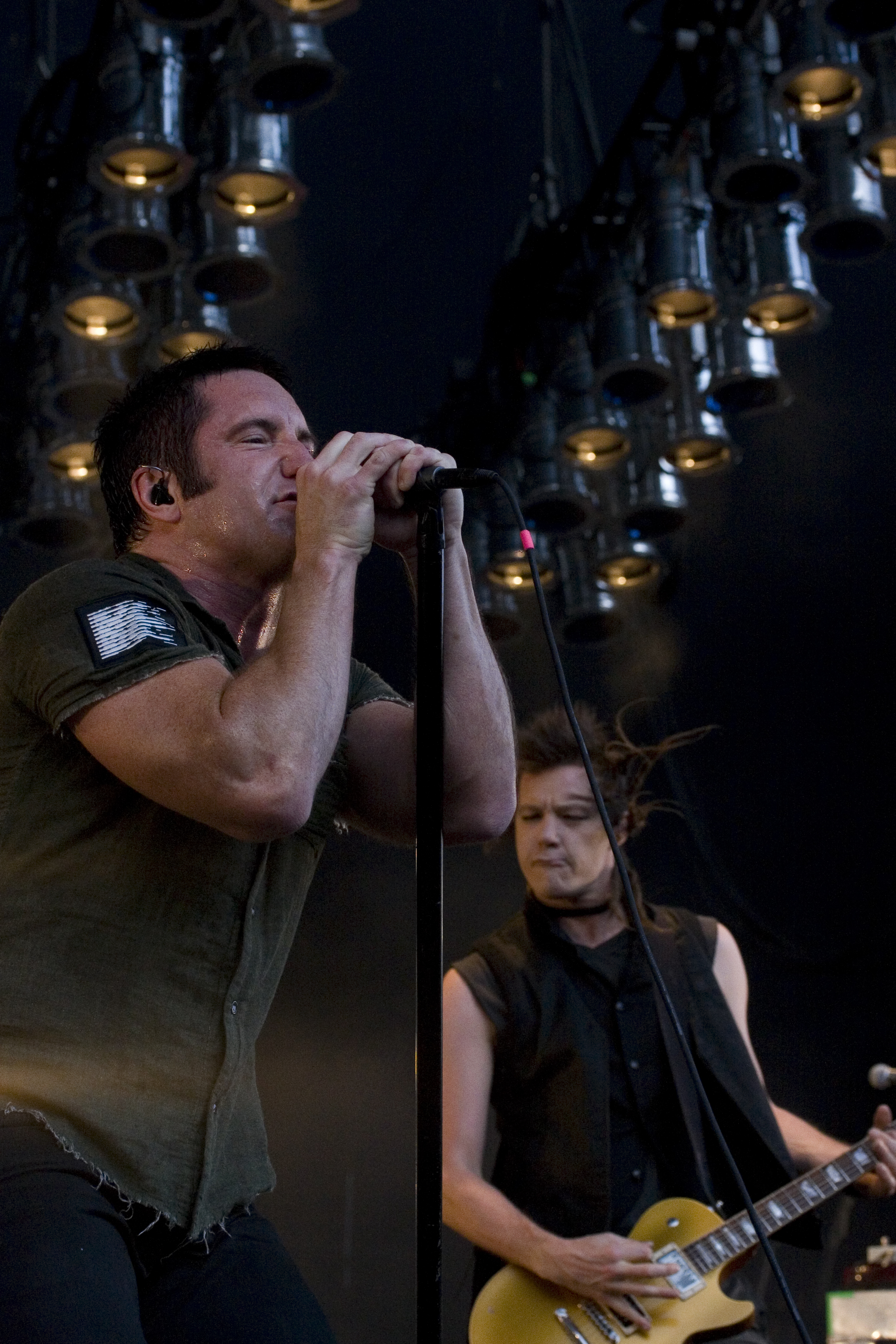
Finck with Nine Inch Nails frontman Trent Reznor

In October 2009 Finck and former Guns N' Roses bandmates Axl Rose, Tommy Stinson and Buckethead were named in a lawsuit by electronic musician Ulrich Schnauss's record labels Independiente and Domino alleging that they had committed copyright infringement by using portions of his compositions in the song "Riad 'n the Bedouins". Finck appears on the 2010 album The Lady Killer by artist CeeLo Green, performing guitar on the track "The Lady Killer Theme (Outro)".

On March 12, 2012, Finck appeared on-stage with Guns N' Roses, performing "Better", a song he co-wrote with Axl Rose.

Finck rejoined Nine Inch Nails for the 2013–14 tours, and has since performed with the band on each subsequent tour.

== Personal life ==
Since 2001, Finck has been married to acrobat Bianca Sapetto, by whom he has two children. They met while working in Cirque du Soleil. Besides being a musician he also creates artwork and displays some of his own drawings and photos on his website. In 2007 he contributed artwork in the form of ink drawings to the album Frames by Oceansize at the request of their guitarist Gambler. In 2003, Finck was credited as one of the writers of a production called "My Birthday Party", which incorporated acrobatics, storytelling, music, acting, and clowning. The show included actor Viggo Mortensen and was performed at the Miles Memorial Playhouse in Santa Monica, California.

On February 23, 2009 session drummer Josh Freese, who has been a bandmate of Finck's in both Guns N' Roses and Nine Inch Nails, announced that as part of the pricing strategy for his new solo album Since 1972 a one-off package costing $75,000 would include "a flying trapeze lesson with Josh and Robin from NIN" followed by a visit to Robin's place afterwards where "his wife will make you raw lasagna".

Finck is known for his theatrical appearance when performing, making use of makeup, costumes and clothing to enhance his stage presence. He has also been known to break out into eccentric dance moves during songs with various facial expressions. Between tours and appearances he frequently makes radical alterations to his image, and is particularly famous among fans for his many distinctive and often unusual hair styles. Axl Rose has described him as leading "one of the most different lives I know of starting with the trapeze in his backyard to the TV in his closet."

== Equipment ==
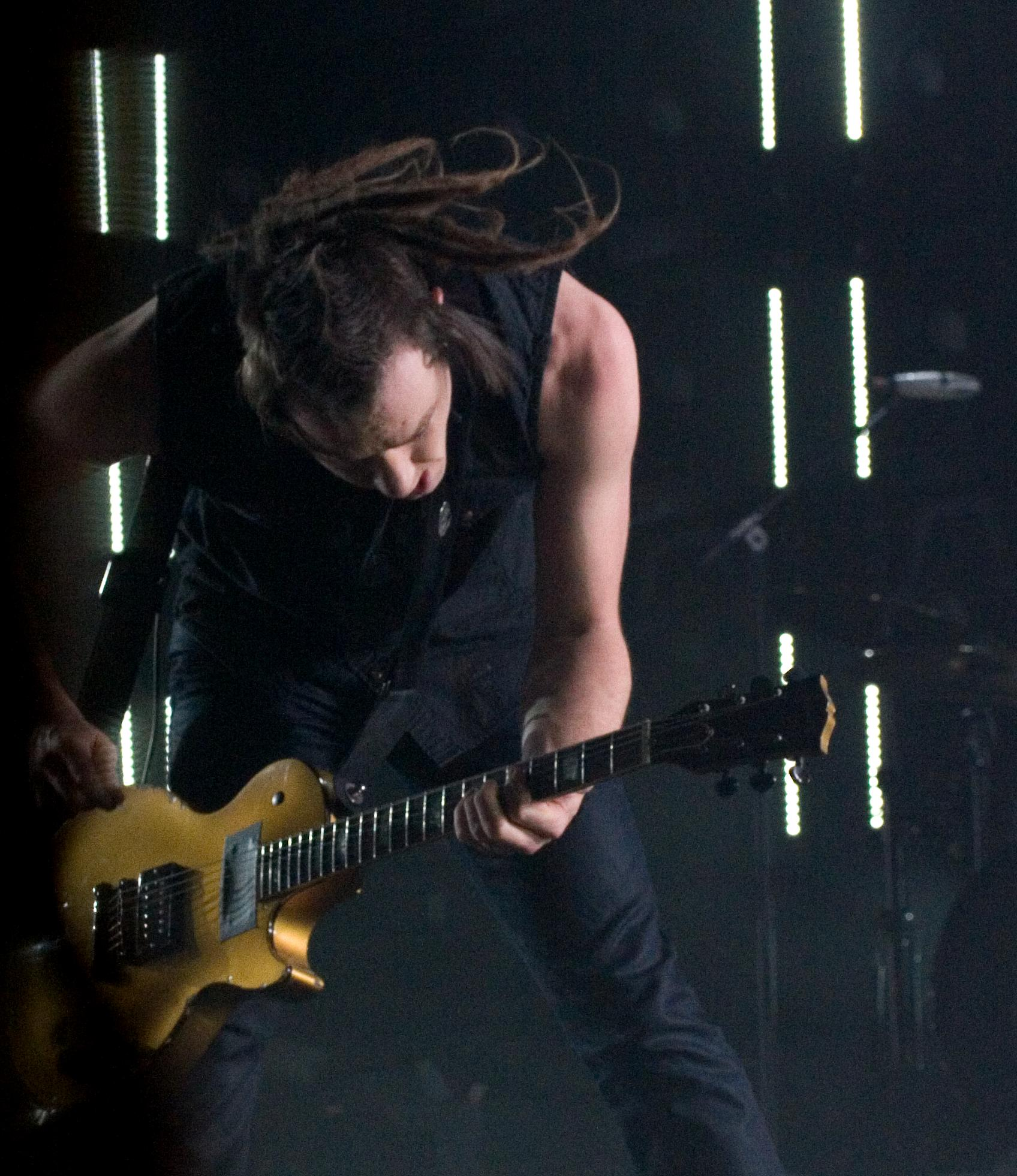
Robin Finck with Nine Inch Nails in 2008

Finck is closely associated with Gibson Les Paul guitars and uses different versions of the guitar that are built from a variety of woods and equipped with numerous pickup combinations (in 2006 he was photographed at the New York City Gibson Guitar showroom collecting a Custom Les Paul Standard '58 Reissue for use on tour with Guns N' Roses). Many of them have been customized and he often moves the pickup selector switch from the top of the guitar's body, as he has said the standard configuration is obstructive. After re-joining Nine Inch Nails in 2008 he began using several other guitars on stage, including Jerry Jones baritone guitars (similar in shape to Danelectro guitars), Fender Jazzmasters, Fender Telecasters and Gibson ES-355s. In 2020, Finck and Reverend Guitars unveiled a signature guitar for Finck based on Reverend's Sensei using Railhammer Chisel pickups. Finck removed the tone knob as he only uses the volume and bass contour knobs.

In 2009 Finck signed with Schecter Guitar Research as an official endorsee and started using a number of Schecter guitars while touring with NIN, including custom versions of the PT Fastback and Ultra III. He also ordered a custom "Tempest Classic" guitar with gold top finish, an in-built compressor and a wah effect in place of the two tone controls. In late 2009 Schecter issued a press release which announced a limited edition Robin Finck signature guitar based on the Ultra Cure and Ultra III models was entering production. Finck is also listed as a user of Godin guitars on the company's official website and can be seen playing Godin guitars on the Nine Inch Nails live DVD And All That Could Have Been.

He uses a broad range of guitar amps (various models by Marshall Amplification and Mesa Boogie) and effects (including the BOSS DD-5 Digital Delay, Dunlop wah-wah, Devi Ever bit, the legend of fuzz, and RockTron Vodoo Valve) and is known to work very hard to re-create studio tones and textures when playing on stage. He frequently shoves the body of his guitar up against the speakers of his amplifiers during live performances to generate feedback and increased distortion. For some NIN songs he has been known to use an e-bow, as seen during the clip for "La Mer" on the And All That Could Have Been live DVD.

While his primary role in Guns N' Roses was that of lead guitarist, Finck is credited with playing some of the electronic keyboard parts on Chinese Democracy. Similarly, although he performs with Nine Inch Nails mainly as a guitarist he often plays other instruments on stage, including lap steel guitar (with effects pedals mounted to the body of the instrument), ukulele, mandolin and keyboards/synthesizers. He also contributes backing vocals.

== Discography ==
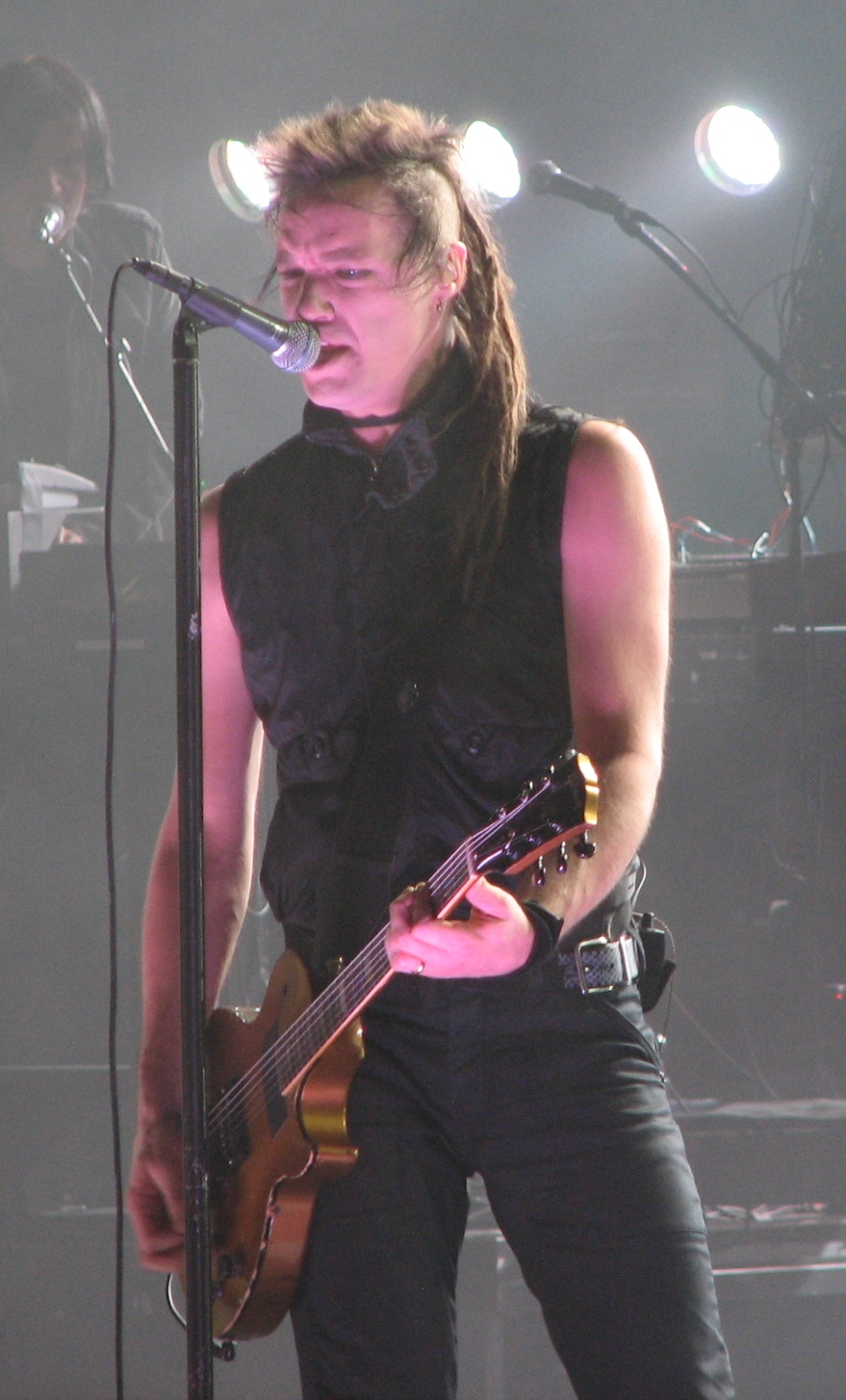
Finck performing with Nine Inch Nails in 2008

=== With Nine Inch Nails ===
Title	Release date	Label
March of the Pigs	1994	Nothing Records
Closer to God	1994	Nothing Records
Further Down the Spiral	1995	Nothing Records
And All That Could Have Been	2002	Nothing Records
The Downward Spiral (Deluxe Edition)	2004	Nothing Records
The Slip	2008	The Null Corporation

Contributions:

- March of the Pigs - live music video performance
- Closer To God – "Memorabilia" (Soft Cell cover)
- Further Down the Spiral – Remixes
- And All That Could Have Been – Live Performances
- Still – "The Day The World Went Away"
- The Downward Spiral – "Hurt" Live
- The Slip – guitar, electronics

=== With Guns N' Roses ===
Title	Release date	Label
Chinese Democracy	2008	Geffen Records

Contributions (on Chinese Democracy):

- Lead guitar on all tracks
- Guitar solos on "Chinese Democracy", "Better", "Street of Dreams", "There Was a Time", "Catcher in the Rye", "I.R.S." and "This I Love"
- Acoustic guitar on "Sorry"
- Keyboards on "Better" and "If the World"
- Co-writer, arrangements, drum arrangement, digital editing and initial production on "Better"
- Co-writer on "Chinese Democracy", "Shackler's Revenge", "Street of Dreams", "Catcher in the Rye", "Riad N' the Bedouins", and "Prostitute"

Other contributions:

- Co-writer on "Hard Skool" (2021)
- Guitar on "Atlas" (2025)

=== Video games ===
Title	Release date	Label	Notes
Noct	2015	Laced Records	Composed with musician Wordclock.
Observation	2019		Scored the opening credit Title Sequence of the video game, with additional audio by Omar Khan and directed by Jon McKellan.
Serious Sam 4	2020		A cover of the "Hero" song from Serious Sam 3: BFE called "Hero Too".
Sleep Awake	2025		Debut game for Finck's studio Eyes Out

=== Miscellaneous ===
Title	Release date	Label
Ghosts of Mars (Film Soundtrack)	2001	Varese Sarabande

Contributions:

- 02. Love Siege
- 03. Fight Train
- 07. Power Station
- 12. Ghost Poppin'

Title	Release date	Label
Frames by Oceansize	2007	Superball Music

Contributions:

- Album artwork – ink drawings

Title	Release date	Label
The Lady Killer by Cee-Lo Green	2010	Elektra Records / Roadrunner Records

Contributions:

- 14. The Lady Killer Theme (Outro)

Title	Release date	Label
Splinter by Gary Numan	2013	Mortal Records / Cooking Vinyl

Contributions:

- 01. I Am Dust
- 06. Lost
- 09. Where I Can Never Be
- 10. We're The Unforgiven
