= Meet Me at My Funeral =

Single by Brigade

from the album Lights
- Released: 21 August 2006
- Recorded: 2006
- Genre: Rock
- Length: 4:20
- Label: Mighty Atom

Brigade singles chronology
"Magneto" (2006)	"Meet Me at My Funeral" (2006)	"Guillotine" (2006)

"Meet Me at My Funeral" is the second single from the UK rock band Brigade's debut album Lights. It was released 21 August 2006 and reached number four on the UK Rock Chart.

== Track listing ==
1. "Meet Me at My Funeral"
2. "Made to Wreck"
3. "Null and Void"
4. "Meet Me at My Funeral"
5. "I Should Wake Up"
