= Long Distance Calling (album) =

Studio album by Long Distance Calling
- Released: 17 February 2011
- Recorded: August–September 2010
- Genre: Post-rock, post-metal
- Length: 56:05
- Label: Superball Music

Long Distance Calling chronology
Avoid the Light (2009)	Long Distance Calling (2011)	The Flood Inside (2013)

Professional ratings
Review scores
Source	Rating
AllMusic	3/5 stars

Long Distance Calling is the third studio album by German post-rock/post-metal band Long Distance Calling. It was released on 17 February 2011, through Superball Music and earned the band their first chart entry. The song Middleville features John Bush on vocals.

== Track listing ==
No.	Title	Music	Length
1.	"Into the Black Wide Open"	Long Distance Calling	8:32
2.	"The Figrin D’an Boogie"	Long Distance Calling	6:08
3.	"Invisible Giants"	Long Distance Calling	7:10
4.	"Timebends"	Long Distance Calling	8:12
5.	"Arecibo (Long Distance Calling)"	Long Distance Calling	5:53
6.	"Middleville"	Long Distance Calling	8:30
7.	"Beyond the Void"	Long Distance Calling	11:40
Total length:			56:05
