= Magneto (song) =

Single by Brigade

from the album Lights
- Released: 1 May 2006
- Recorded: 2006
- Genre: Rock
- Length: 4:09
- Label: Mighty Atom Records

Brigade singles chronology
"Magneto" (2006)	"Meet Me at My Funeral" (2006)

"Magneto" is the debut single from the UK rock band, Brigade, off their debut album Lights. It reached #3 on the UK Rock Chart and #69 on the UK Singles Chart.

== Track listing ==
1. "Magneto"
2. "AM to Try"
3. "Versus You There Is No Contest"
4. "Magneto"
5. "Twenty One"
