= Lights (Brigade album) =

Studio album by Brigade
- Released: 29 May 2006
- Recorded: 2005–2006
- Genre: Alternative rock, post-hardcore
- Length: 49:52
- Label: Mighty Atom
- Producer: Joe Gibb

Brigade chronology
Made To Wreck (EP) (2005)	Lights (2006)	Come Morning We Fight (2008)

Singles from Lights
- 1. "Magneto" Released: 1 May 2006; 2. "Meet Me At My Funeral" Released: 21 August 2006; 3. "Guillotine" Released: 6 November 2006

Professional ratings
Review scores
Source	Rating
Big Cheese	4/5 stars
Burn Magazine	5/5 stars
Kerrang!	4/5 stars
Music OMH	4/5 stars
NME	(8/10)
The Fly	4/5 stars
Rock Sound	(8/10)

Lights is the debut studio album by the English alternative rock band Brigade. It was produced by Joe Gibb and released on 29 May 2006 through independent label Mighty Atom Records.

== Track listing ==
All tracks are written by Brigade.

No.	Title	Length
1.	"Magneto"	4:09
2.	"Meet Me At My Funeral"	4:20
3.	"Assemble/Dissemble"	4:09
4.	"Made to Wreck"	4:24
5.	"I'll Be Your Emergency"	4:08
6.	"Go Slow"	5:04
7.	"Adjust"	3:20
8.	"Guillotine"	4:03
9.	"Null and Void"	5:39
10.	"Queenie"	4:33
11.	"The Hits the Scrapes"	6:03
Total length:		49:52

== Limited Edition ==
A limited-edition version of the album was released featuring two extra tracks and a bonus DVD.

=== Bonus Tracks ===
12. "Safe Hands"
13. "21"

=== DVD ===
Promo Videos

- Magneto
- Meet Me At My Funeral
- Go Slow
- Meet Me At My Funeral (2004)

Live Videos from "The Bull and Gate" in 2003
From the Floor (fan videos)
Early demos and alternative mixes
Photo Gallery

== Personnel ==
The following personnel contributed to Lights:

- Will Simpson - lead vocals, rhythm guitar, lyrics
- James Plant - lead guitar, backing vocals
- Naoto Hori - bass guitar
- Nathaniel Finbow - drums, percussion
