= Will Be Will Be =

Studio album by Brigade
- Released: 31 May 2011
- Recorded: Early 2011
- Genre: Alternative rock, post-hardcore
- Length: 41:57
- Label: Homespun Records
- Producer: Brigade

Brigade chronology
Come Morning We Fight (2008)	Will Be Will Be (2011)

Will Be Will Be is the third studio album by English alternative rock band Brigade, released on 31 May 2011 on Homespun Records by Pledgemusic.

== Track listing ==
All lyrics are written by Will Simpson; all music is composed by Brigade.

1. "200 Scratches" - 3:32
2. "A Heinous Crime With Draconian Consequences" - 3:26
3. "Eden" - 3:27
4. "Adieu" - 3:18
5. "The Beating" - 3:00
6. "From Nothing Something Comes" - 3:00
7. "Sting Sting" - 4:00
8. "Laughter Lines" - 3:21
9. "It's A Mess (If It Ain't, It'll Do Till A Mess Gets Here)" - 3:58
10. "Tiny Pieces" - 4:32
11. "Find Your Own Way Home" - 6:23

== Autumn Release ==
Brigade have confirmed by a posting on their facebook page that "Will Be Will Be" will receive a wider release in the autumn of 2011.

== Reception ==
Professional ratings
Review scores
Source	Rating
AbsolutePunk	(8.3/10)
Kerrang!	4/5 stars
Rock Sound	(8/10)

== Personnel ==
The following personnel contributed to Will Be Will Be:

- Will Simpson - lead vocals, rhythm guitar, lyrics
- James Plant - lead guitar, backing vocals
- Naoto Hori - bass guitar
- Andrew Kearton - drums, percussion
