= Frames (Oceansize album) =

Studio album by Oceansize
- Released: 1 October 2007
- Recorded: 2006–2007, Monnow Valley Studio, Monmouth, Wales
- Genres: Progressive rock; space rock; post-rock; alternative rock
- Length: 66:26
- Label: Superball Music
- Producers: Chris Sheldon; Oceansize

Oceansize chronology
Everyone into Position (2005)	Frames (2007)	Home & Minor (2009)

Frames is the third studio album by British progressive/alternative rock band Oceansize, released on 1 October 2007 on Superball Music. The album marks the first appearance of bassist Steven Hodson, following the departure of Jon Ellis in 2005.

In May 2008, the band re-released the album with an accompanying DVD, featuring a full performance of the album, a documentary focusing on the making of the album, and various live tracks. The package also includes an Oceansize sticker.

The band played the album in full on 18 October 2008 in Manchester as part of a trilogy of shows that celebrated the band's ten-year anniversary.

Vocalist/guitarist Mike Vennart states that:

When Jon [Ellis] left I thought we were fucked. This is not a slight on Steven [Hodson], and I never said to anybody that I didn't think it would be as good any more, but I had a vibe about it. Then halfway through mixing it really started to make sense and I knew it would be something our fans would like. It's the kind of record they would want us to make, although I expect our hardcore fans to get it and hate and say "What have they done?" then a year later it'll be their favorite record.

== Background ==
The album features "a lot of songs about grudges and negative energy”, with the song "Commemorative ____ T-Shirt", inspired by a gift to Vennart by the band Cardiacs, which includes a time signature of "11/8 or 9/8, so when we were naming the song it was like 'it's in 11, it's in 9, it's got to be 9/11",

Regarding the album, Vennart states that:

Everyone into Position was all over the place with so many different styles and moods, whereas I think these songs know each other.It was a liberating experience making this record, because to be quite honest, we didn’t care what people thought of it. We were very insular, doing it six days a week and indulging ourselves, and I think that means it’s not contrived, it’s a lot more us than we’ve done before. On our second album, we did that classic thing that every band seems to do – try to sanitize who we are to make a bid for airplay and try and trim everything down so it’s nice and concise. I think that worked for some of the songs, but there was a couple of singles that didn’t really suit us. The fans didn’t like them and they didn’t get played on the radio anyway! So when we sat down to write this one, the only thing we said was ‘let’s not make any singles!"

Guitarist/Keyboardist Gambler revealed that Frames was his favorite record, stating that "after the changes that happened after Everyone Into Position – new bass player and new manager – that album seemed like a great achievement, kind of a new beginning.". In this record, Gambler plays more keyboards than in previous and successive albums.

Vennart previously stated that the album was heavily inspired by the album Alloy, from Silo. Particularly from the band's penchant for odd time signatures.

== Title ==
Lead singer, Mike Vennart, notes that the title: “evokes strength and structure, and kind of a sense of time as well – every second is like a frame of your life that’s ticking away, and then it’s gone. You can try and remember to try and look at it. But you’ll probably only remember it as a snapshot, you won’t remember the whole movement of the thing.”

Vennart however admitted that Frames was not the original title of the album. "The album was supposed to be called The Frame, after the song on the album, but then one of our friends, who’s in Future of The Left, said ‘I love the title… Frames, isn’t it?’ We just thought, ‘well it wasn’t, but that’s a lot better. It’s an angular title, it evokes strength and structure and it’s quite cinematic. But hey, whatever you think it means, that’s what it means!"

== Song information ==
Mike Vennart states that "Commemorative ____ T-Shirt" - originally entitled "Commemorative 9/11 T-Shirt" - doesn't have "anything to do with 9/11. I was sold a t-shirt by the singer of the Cardiacs. On the label it read 'For ages 9-11', and when he sold it to me he said "oh, here's one of our commemorative 9/11 teeshirts," so I got thinking about what sort of person would wear a 9/11 teeshirt. Someone who's not really looking to the future.

== Artwork ==
The ink drawings, featured in the album's artwork, are by Nine Inch Nails and Guns N' Roses guitarist Robin Finck. Guitarist Gambler states that Finck is "a hero of mine. We saw his art; it is pretty ambiguous and amazing, so we just asked him if could we use some of his stuff."

== Reception ==
Professional ratings
Review scores
Source	Rating
AllMusic	3.5/5 stars
BBC	(favourable)
Contactmusic.com	(ambivalent)
Kerrang!	4/5 stars
Metal Storm	8.5/10
MusicOMH	3.5/5 stars
PopMatters	7/10 stars
Rocklouder	5/5 stars
Scene Point Blank	9.0/10
Sputnikmusic	4/5

The album was named as one of Classic Rock‘s 10 essential progressive rock albums of the decade.

Metal Storm.net gave the album a positive review, stating that "(the band)...didn't take so many risks but...found the way to write an album a lot deeper than its two previous ones.... Frames is a classy album that confirms that Oceansize deserves to be at the top of the list of the new wave of progressive bands. MusicOMH was also positive, in saying that the "instrumental track An Old Friend Of The Christies builds on a simple chorale-like statement to shake the rafters, while Trail Of Fire and Savant feature particularly impressive codas. Drummer Mark Heron gets in on the act, too, with some heavy gunfire in the fills of Commemorative T-Shirt and some most effective stick work evident even in the underpinning rhythms."

Scene Point Blank praised the work of producer/mixer Chris Sheldon, saying that "(Sheldon) actually matters a lot because he was more effective in bridging the group's melody with the experimental wildfire that permeates their existence. The influence of previous hands is particularly appreciated in the vocals department. With Sheldon back, gone are those all too frequent moments of Mike Vennart's croons being completely shredded into non-existence thanks to the tornado of guitars and drums that dominate the lion's share of Oceansize's material." The review continued on, stating that "Frames brandishes the near full cultivation of everything Oceansize has been trying to accomplish in such a brief period of time. Already proving to be light-years ahead of so many of their peers, one can only wait with bated breath to see what they do next. For the time being though, this record won't be leaving the rotation anytime soon."

== Track listing ==
1. "Commemorative ____ T-Shirt" – 8:37
2. "Unfamiliar" – 6:32
3. "Trail of Fire" – 8:07
4. "Savant" – 8:07
5. "Only Twin" – 7:22
6. "An Old Friend of the Christy's" – 10:19
7. "Sleeping Dogs and Dead Lions" – 6:42
8. "The Frame" – 10:40

Digipak Bonus Track

9. "Voorhees" – 11:10

Deluxe Edition Frames Live DVD - Live In Manchester 2007 and Bonus Features

1. Frames - Full Live Album Performance - 1:10:41
  1. Commemorative ____ T-shirt
  2. Unfamiliar
  3. Trail of Fire
  4. Savant
  5. Only Twin
  6. An Old Friend Of The Christies (Listed as "Old Friend Of The Christies")
  7. Sleeping Dogs And Dead Lions (Listed as "Sleeping Dogs")
  8. The Frame (Listed as "Frame")
2. Recording Frames Documentary - 26:13
3. Commemorative ____ T-Shirt / Unfamiliar (Live) - 16:55 (Islington Academy, London, 17/10/2007)
4. Trail Of Fire (Live) - 8:31 (London O2 Arena, Manchester M.E.N. & Nottingham Arena; sound recorded live in London O2 Arena.)
5. Sleeping Dogs & Dead Lions (Live) - 7:33 (recorded during the Frames tour in October & November 2007. Recorded in the following places: Classico, Rome, Italy, 02/11/07; Live Club, Trezzo, Italy, 01/11/07; Colos-Saal, Aschaffenberg, Germany, 06/11/07; Ekko, Utrecht, Netherlands, 10/11/07; Rohre, Stuttgart, Germany, 05/11/07; Islington Academy, London, U.K., 17/10/2007; Melkweg, Amsterdam, Netherlands, 13/11/07; Vera, Groningen, Netherlands, 21/10/07)
6. Slideshow 7:35

Deluxe Edition Frames Live DVD (DVD-Audio)

1. Commemorative ____ T-shirt
2. Unfamiliar
3. Trail of Fire
4. Savant
5. Only Twin
6. An Old Friend Of The Christies
7. Sleeping Dogs And Dead Lions
8. The Frame
9. Intro
10. Ketemine Van
11. Scribble Pad
12. Day off
13. Only Twin Strings
14. Savant Strings

== Personnel ==
The following people contributed to Frames:

Oceansize

- Mike Vennart – vocals, guitar
- Gambler – guitar, keyboards
- Steve Durose – guitar, vocals
- Steven Hodson – bass, keyboards, drums
- Mark Heron – drums, percussion

Additional musicians

- Paula Simpson – violin
- Justin Lingard – violin
- Semay Wu – cello

Recording personnel

- Chris Sheldon – producer, engineer, recording, mixing
- Oceansize – producer
- Jim Anderson – assistant engineer
- Dick Beetham – mastering

Artwork

- Robin Finck – ink drawings
- Carl Godwin – photography
- Sandra Hiltmann – design
