= Satellite Bay =

Studio album by Long Distance Calling
- Released: 21 September 2007
- Recorded: April 2007 at Tonmeisterei in Oldenburg
- Genre: Post-rock
- Length: 58:39
- Label: Viva Hate Records

Long Distance Calling chronology
Satellite Bay (2007)	Avoid the Light (2009)

Satellite Bay is the first studio album by German post-rock band Long Distance Calling. The album was recorded April 2007 at Tonmeisterei in Oldenburg and released through Viva Hate Records on 21 September 2007.

== Reception ==
Professional ratings
Review scores
Source	Rating
Babyblaue Seiten	10/15
Metal.de	6.5/7
Metal News	8/10
Metal Rage	74/100
Metal Reviews	86/100
Metal Storm	8.1/10

The album received moderate to favorable reviews among metal reviewers. Alexander Eitner of Metal News gave the album a positive review saying that Long Distance Calling are able to write “captivating and varied songs” through the full playing time of the studio album. For Markus Endres from the online magazine Metal.de, Long Distance Calling "Walls down and kidnaps listeners into other spheres" for which he gave it eight out of ten points. Thomas Kohlruß of Babyblaue Seiten gave the album a moderate review describing Satellite Bay as a "great debut of a truly outstanding instrumental band".

== Track listing ==
No.	Title	Length
1.	"Jungfernflug"	10:35
2.	"Fire in the Mountain"	7:27
3.	"Aurora"	8:42
4.	"Horizon"	5:53
5.	"The Very Last Day"	10:22
6.	"Built Without Hands" (Featuring Peter Dolving)	8:12
7.	"Swallow the Water"	7:26
Total length:		58:39

== Personnel ==
=== Long Distance Calling ===
- Florian Funtmann - guitar
- David Jordan - guitar
- Jan Joffmann - bass
- Janosch Rathmer - drums
- Reimut van Bonn – ambience

=== Additional musicians ===
- Peter Dolving – vocals on "Built Without Hands"

=== Production ===
- Stefan Wibbeke – layout, design
- Long Distance Calling – layout design
