= Charlie Barnes (musician) =

English singer and songwriter (born 1989)

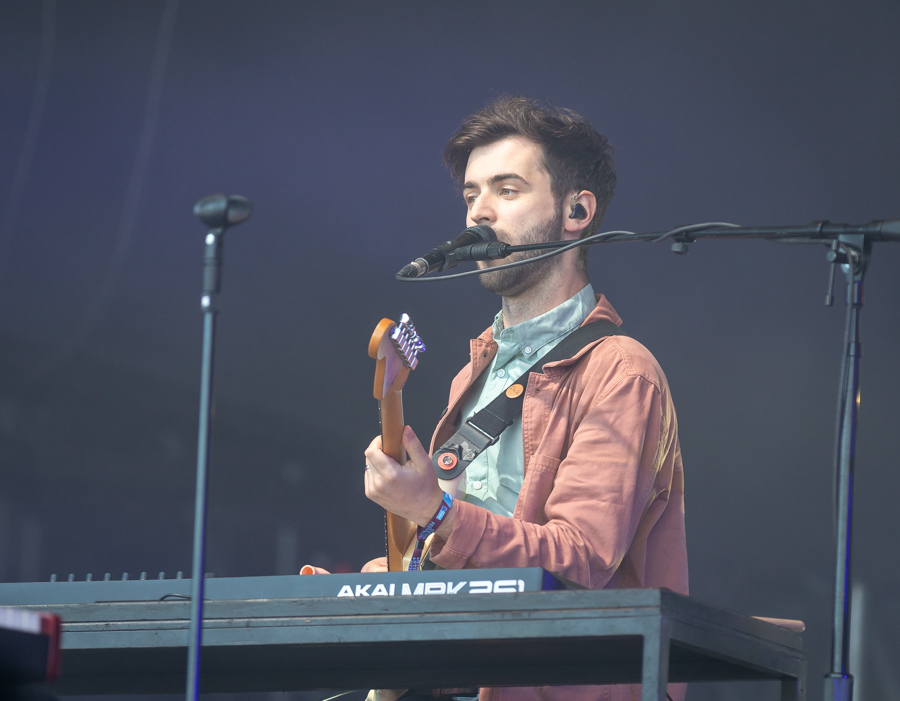
- Charlie Barnes performing with Bastille at Stavernfestivalen 2019

Background information
- Born: 31 May 1989 (age 36); Lichfield, England
- Origin: Leeds, England
- Genres: Alternative rock; post-rock; indie rock
- Years active: 2007–present
- Labels: Superball
- Website: www.charliebarnesmusic.co.uk

Charlie Barnes (born 31 May 1989) is an English singer and songwriter. He is a vocalist and multi-instrumentalist performing under his own name, and currently as a touring musician with indie rock band Bastille. He has released four albums; the latest, The Heart of The Home, was released in October 2024.

== Career ==
Born in Lichfield, Barnes developed an interest in music at an early age and studied at the University of Huddersfield. During his studies he began to play solo shows using electronics. In 2010, when completing his final year of study, he self-released the album Geekk., as part of his final project. In 2009, he befriended the band Amplifier and performed support slots for them. After moving to Leeds, he joined the band as a touring musician. In 2015, he signed to Superball Music and released his debut album More Stately Mansions on 11 May 2015. The album was produced by Steve Durose of Oceansize, and partly inspired by the recent death of his mother. The song "Sing to God" featured as the first single of the album.

On 4 June 2015, Bastille announced that Barnes would be joining them as a touring musician after an audition. With Bastille, Barnes plays guitar, bass, keyboards and percussion.

Barnes started his first solo UK tour on 6 October 2015, his first show was in Leeds, and his last in Cambridge (23 October). In early November, Barnes had another solo tour, this took place in Germany. He described the playing live of the songs his band as 'honing [them] together to give the songs I write an identity beyond the words and the chords and the melody'.

In 2016, Charlie Barnes created a remix for the duo Alma. The song he edited, "To the Stars", was featured on an album alongside other reworks and remixes of Alma's work.

In December 2017, Barnes announced the album Oceanography to be released in March 2018. Also in 2017 he began working on the side project, The Society Pages, with guitarist Benjamin Wall. "The So Called Debut Album by the Society Pages" was released in November 2020.

In April 2018, he was a supporting act along with To Kill a King during Bastille's 'Reorchestrated' tour.

== Discography ==
- Geekk. (30 May 2010)
- More Stately Mansions (11 May 2015)
- Oceanography (9 March 2018)
- Last Night's Glitter (3 July 2020)
- The Heart of The Home (18 October 2024)
