= Music for Nurses =

EP by Oceansize
- Released: 11 October 2004
- Genres: New prog, alternative rock, progressive metal, post-rock
- Length: 24:50
- Label: Beggars Banquet Records
- Producers: Chris Sheldon & Oceansize - tracks 1 & 2, Mark Williams and Oceansize - tracks 3–5

Oceansize chronology
Effloresce (2003)	''Music for Nurses'' (2004)	Everyone into Position (2005)

Professional ratings
Review scores
Source	Rating
Drowned in Sound	(8/10) link
Kerrang!	5/5 stars
Scene Point Blank	(7.5/10) link

Music for Nurses is a 2004 EP by Oceansize, released on Beggars Banquet Records.

== Track listing ==
1. "One out of None" (5:40)
2. "Paper Champion" (5:45)
3. "Drag the 'Nal" (1:45)
4. "Dead Dogs an' All Sorts" (4:44)
5. "As the Smoke Clears" (7:05)
