= Agent Blue (band) =

British alternative rock band

- Origin: Stoke-on-Trent, England
- Genres: Alternative rock; punk rock; hard rock
- Years active: 2002–2007
- Label: Fierce Panda Records
- Past members: Nic Andrews; Mark Taylor; Josh Hill; Calum Murphy; Matt Jones

Agent Blue was an alternative rock band from Stoke-on-Trent, England. Their songs were featured in various media. "Something Else" and "Snowhill" are on the soundtracks of the racing games, FlatOut and Burnout Paradise, respectively. "Something Else" has also been used on various BBC television shows such as Blue Peter and most frequently Top Gear. The band themselves starred in the opening scenes of the television series, Mayo, playing the same track. "Sex Drugs and Rocks Through Your Window" was featured in an episode of the television series, Bones.

However, the band lost a great deal of momentum after the delayed release of their debut LP A Stolen Honda Vision which was not released for almost two years after its recording.

In 2007, Agent Blue decided to split up and released this statement on their website and MySpace page:

After much thought and debate within the band, we've decided that Agent Blue has reached the end of the road! We've had an amazing time over the last 5 years or so, but after calum (bass) left last November, we realised quickily that we couldnt carry on any longer, as Agent Blue were 5 different people, different influences, different styles etc and would never have worked as Agent Blue with 1 of those factors missing. we're working on something new and we'll let you in on our plans shorty, but for now we thought we'd lay Agent Blue to rest! Thanks to all the people who stood by us over the years and for the support of all the fans, it really has been a pleasure. Agent Blue

== Members ==
- Nic Andrews – vocals
- Mark Taylor – guitar
- Josh Hill – guitar
- Calum Murphy – bass
- Matt Jones – drums

== Discography ==
=== Albums ===
- A Stolen Honda Vision (2006)

=== Singles ===
Year	Song	Album	Peak position
Year	Song	Album	UK Singles Chart
2003	"Snowhill"	A Stolen Honda Vision	-
2004	"Sex, Drugs & Rocks Through Your Window"	A Stolen Honda Vision	71
2004	"Something Else"	A Stolen Honda Vision	59
2004	"Crossbreed"	A Stolen Honda Vision	-
2005	"Children's Children"	A Stolen Honda Vision	62
2006	"Out With the New" / "Monster Monster"	A Stolen Honda Vision	-
