= Johnny Panic =

London-based punk rock band

- Origin: London, England
- Genres: Punk rock; Alternative rock
- Years active: 1999–2011
- Members: Rob Solly; Jonny Shock; Matt James; Sean Mannion
- Past members: Nash Francis
- Website: https://www.johnnypanic.com/

Johnny Panic are a punk rock band from London, formed in 2002.

== Band members ==
- Rob Solly – Guitar (founder member)
- Jonny Shock – Percussion (founder member)
- Matt James – Guitar and backing vocals (founder member)
- Sean Mannion – Bass and backing vocals

=== Past members ===
- Nash Francis – Bass and backing vocals (founder member)

== History ==
Johnny Panic was founded in 2002. Their music can be described as rock music, inspired by bands such as The Clash and The Jam. Following the release of several singles, the band's debut album The Violent Dazzling was released in 2005. Soon after Nash Francis left the band later to become a painter and was replaced by Sean Mannion. Their second album, The Good Fight, was released in November 2007 on Repeat Records and was preceded by the single "Dislocation" on 29 October.

In 2006 their track "I Live For" was used in the soundtrack to the video game Test Drive Unlimited, and their cover of The Turtles' hit "Happy Together" was used in an npower television commercial. Their name comes from the short story Johnny Panic and the Bible of Dreams by Sylvia Plath.

The band finally released their third album, "Ritual Riots" on 26 September 2011. This has been preceded by the single "The World Around You", released on 16 September 2011.

== Discography ==
=== Albums ===
Year	Title
2005	The Violent Dazzling
2007	The Good Fight
2011	Ritual Riots

=== Singles ===
Year	Title	UK Chart
2004	"You're a Fool"	—
2004	"Burn Your Youth"	69
2004	"Chemical Girlfriend" (download only)	—
2005	"Minority of One"	60
2005	"Automatic Healer"	49
2006	"Happy Together" / "I Live For"	—
2007	"The Rebel" (download only)	—
2007	"Dislocation"	—
2008	"The Rebel"	—
2011	"The World Around You"	—
"—" denotes releases that did not chart.
