= Serpico (surname) =

Serpico is an Italian surname. Notable people with the surname include:

- Frank Serpico (born 1936), New York Police Department officer
- Jim Serpico, American television producer
- Terry Serpico, American actor
- Vincenzo Serpico (born 1991), Italian rower
