= Long Distance Calling (band) =

German post-rock band

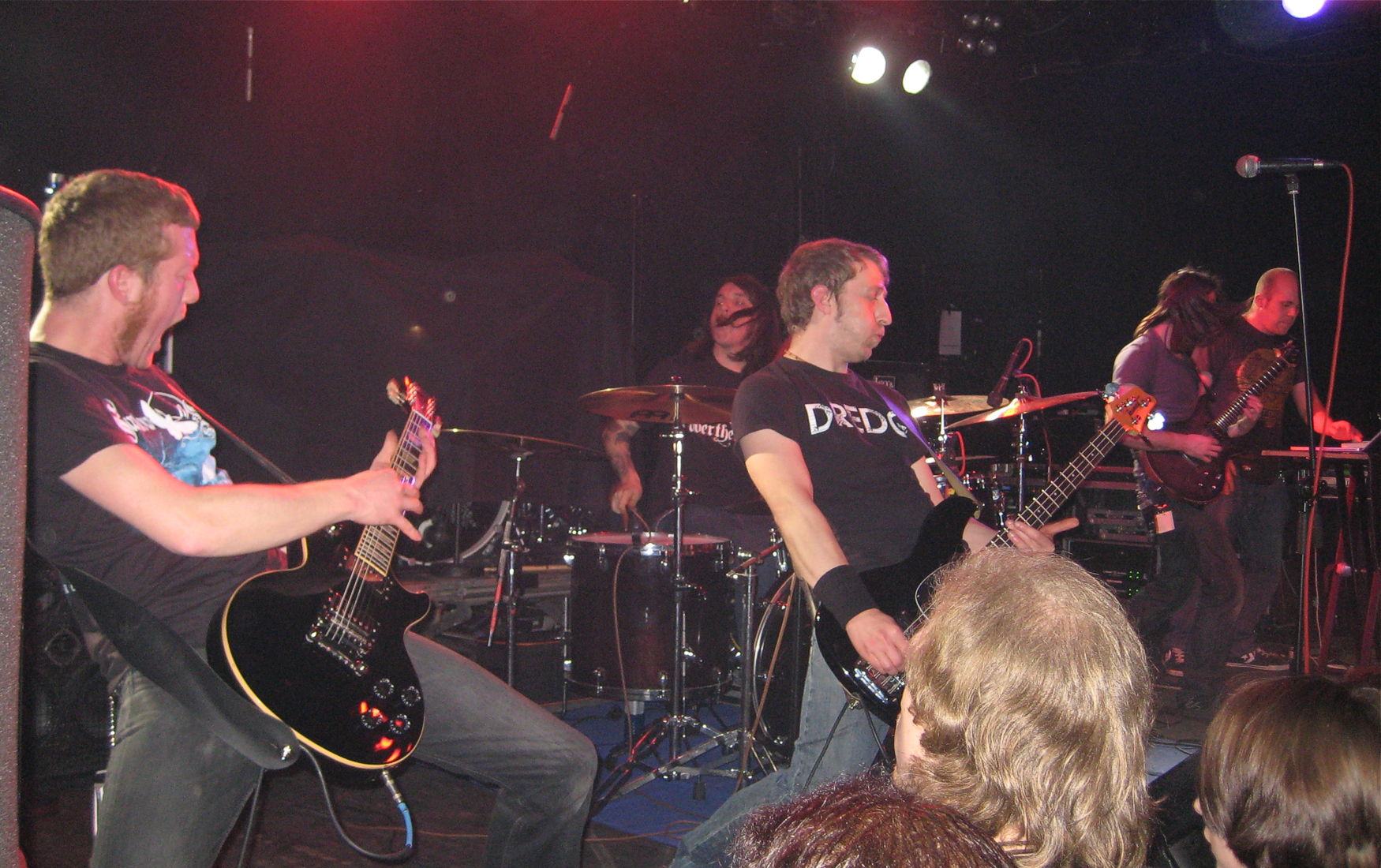
- Live in Frankfurt (2010)

Background information
- Origin: Münster, Germany
- Genres: Post-rock, progressive rock, post-metal, avant-garde metal, progressive metal
- Years active: 2006 – present
- Labels: Superball, Inside Out, SPV, Sony Music
- Members: David Jordan; Janosch Rathmer; Florian Füntmann; Jan Hoffmann
- Website: longdistancecalling.de

Long Distance Calling is a post-rock band from Münster, Germany, formed in 2006. The majority of their tracks are extended instrumentals.

== History ==
In 2008, Long Distance Calling played at the Rock am Ring and Roadburn festivals, and toured Germany in 2009. In 2010, Long Distance Calling and Finnish death/doom band Swallow the Sun supported Katatonia during the New Night Over Europe tour. They supported Protest the Hero on their 2012 European tour. Off the back of the release of Boundless the band performed live at a number of European summer festivals, including Wacken Open Air in 2018.

As of 2022, Long Distance Calling have released eight full-length albums: Satellite Bay (2007), Avoid the Light (2009), Long Distance Calling (2011), The Flood Inside (2013), Nighthawk (2014), Boundless (2018), How Do We Want to Live? (2020), and Eraser (2022). The band have also released two demos and/or split EPs: DMNSTRTN (2006) and 090208 (2008).

The band has collaborated with guest vocalists including Peter Dolving from The Haunted ("Built Without Hands" from Satellite Bay), John Bush from Armored Saint (ex-Anthrax) ("Middleville" from Long Distance Calling), Vincent Cavanagh from Anathema ("Welcome Change" from The Flood Inside) and Jonas Renkse from Swedish metal band Katatonia ("The Nearing Grave" from Avoid the Light).

== Members ==
=== Current members ===
- David Jordan – guitar
- Florian Füntmann – guitar
- Jan Hoffmann – bass
- Janosch Rathmer – drums

=== Past members ===
- Petter Carlsen – vocals
- Martin Fischer – vocals and sounds
- John Bush – vocals

== Discography ==
=== Studio albums ===
- 2007: Satellite Bay (Viva Hate/Cargo Records)
- 2009: Avoid the Light (Superball Music/SPV)
- 2011: Long Distance Calling (Superball Music/SPV)
- 2013: The Flood Inside (Superball Music/SPV)
- 2016: Trips (InsideOut)
- 2018: Boundless (InsideOut)
- 2020: How Do We Want to Live? (InsideOut)
- 2022: Eraser (earMUSIC)
- 2026: The Phantom Void (earMUSIC)

=== Demos and split EPs ===
- 2006: DMNSTRTN (Limited demo album)
- 2008: 090208 (Viva Hate/Cargo Records, Split EP with Leech)
- 2014: Nighthawk (Avoid the Light Records)
- 2021: Ghost (Avoid the Light Records)

=== Singles and music videos ===
- "Jungfernflug" (2008)
- "Into the Black Wide Open" (2012)
- "Tell The End" (2013)
- "Getaway" (2016)
- "Trauma" (2016)
- "Out There" (2017)
- "Ascending" (2018)
- "Hazards" (2020)
- "Voices" (2020)
- "Immunity" (2020)
- "Fever" (2021)
- "Kamilah" (2022)
- "Giants Leaving" (2022)
- "Eraser" (2022)
- "A Secret Place" (2026)
- "The Spiral" (2026)
- "Sinister Companion" (2026)
