= Everyone into Position =

Studio album by Oceansize
- Released: 19 September 2005
- Studios: The Works Recording Studio, Manchester; Monnow Valley Studio, Monmouth, Wales (Drums)
- Genres: Progressive rock, alternative rock, post-hardcore, post-rock, post-metal
- Length: 69:40
- Label: Beggars Banquet Records
- Producers: Dan Austin & Oceansize

Oceansize chronology
Music for Nurses (2004)	Everyone into Position (2005)	Frames (2007)

Professional ratings
Review scores
Source	Rating
AllMusic	3/5 stars
Alternative Press	(3/5)
Drowned in Sound	(7/10)
Kerrang!	4/5 stars
No Ripcord	(8/10)
Pitchfork	(5.9/10)
PopMatters	7/10 stars
ProgArchives	4/5 stars
Rock Sound	8/10 stars
Slant Magazine	4/5 stars

Everyone into Position is the second studio album by British progressive/alternative rock band Oceansize, released on 19 September 2005 on Beggars Banquet. The album marked the final appearance of bassist Jon Ellis.

According to vocalist/guitarist Mike Vennart: "at the beginning of 'Ornament/The Last Wrongs' there are all these weird ambient noises and what it was is that a friend of ours was in the Amazon jungle and recorded all these parrots. They sounded like kids laughing and shouting, not parrots."

== Use in media ==
"Music For A Nurse" was used in an ad campaign for Orange, while "Meredith" was used in an episode of the OC. Both "Music for a Nurse" and "Meredith" have also been used in the BBC drama series Waterloo Road. "Music For A Nurse" was used in the 2007 movie The Invisible during the ending and credits and was included on the soundtrack for the film.

== Track listing ==
1. "The Charm Offensive" – 7:19
  - Contains the hidden track "Emp(irical) Error" in the pregap of the track
2. "Heaven Alive" – 6:20
3. "A Homage to a Shame" – 5:52
4. "Meredith" – 5:26
5. "Music for a Nurse" – 8:16
6. "New Pin" – 5:11
7. "No Tomorrow" – 7:10
8. "Mine Host" – 4:10
9. "You Can't Keep a Bad Man Down" – 7:36
10. "Ornament/The Last Wrongs" – 9:21

== Personnel ==
- Mike Vennart – vocals, guitar
- Gambler – guitar
- Steve Durose – guitar, vocals
- Jon Ellis – bass
- Mark Heron – drums

=== Production ===
- Dan Austin – producer
- Oceansize – producer
- Dan Austin – engineer
- Danton Supple – mixing
- Rob Smith – mixing
- Nick Webb – mastering
- Seth Siro Anton – cover art

== Charts ==
2022 chart performance for Everyone into Position
Chart (2022)	Peak position
German Albums (Offizielle Top 100)	75
