= Gren (band) =

American power-pop trio

Gren was an American power pop trio from Culver City, California, consisting of Brett White (vocals, guitar), Marcus Gonzales (bass) and John "Possum" Hill (drums). They were active from 1994 to 1996.

== History ==
Gren formed in early 1994. The band's sound drew comparisons with Nirvana, Shudder to Think, and Bob Mould. Billboard called their sound "a straightforward assault of guitar-driven rock and soul."

The band was signed to I.R.S. Records and released their only full-length album Camp Grenada in 1995. The album was produced by Tim O'Heir (Sebadoh, Belly, Dinosaur Jr.) at Cherokee Studios in Los Angeles. Gren promoted this album with extensive touring of the United States, including a stint as opening for the Ramones in 1995-96. The single "She Shines" reached the Top 40 on the Billboard Hot Mainstream Rock chart.

Gren disbanded in 1996. A five-song EP titled Somebody Said You'd Hate This was released in 2008.

Gren released two more songs direct to YouTube in June 2020 for what they called the "Quarantine Sessions". The parts for the songs were recorded separately and then mixed together later.

== Discography ==
- Camp Grenada (1995)
- Somebody Said You'd Hate This (EP, 2008)
