= Effloresce (Oceansize album) =

Studio album by Oceansize
- Released: 29 September 2003
- Recorded: February–March 2003
- Studios: Jacobs Studio, Farnham, Surrey
- Genres: Progressive rock; alternative rock; post-rock; space rock
- Length: 75:34
- Label: Beggars Banquet
- Producers: Chris Sheldon; Oceansize

Oceansize chronology
Relapse (2002)	Effloresce (2003)	Music for Nurses (2004)

Effloresce is the debut studio album by British progressive/alternative rock band Oceansize. It was released on 29 September 2003. The record garnered considerable praise from critics.

Professional ratings
Review scores
Source	Rating
AllMusic	3/5 stars
Drowned in Sound	(9/10)
The List	4/5 medals
The PRP	(4/5) link
Scene Point Blank	(9.5/10) link
Sputnikmusic	(4.5/5)
Tiny Mix Tapes	link

== Track listing ==
All songs written by Oceansize.

1. "I Am the Morning" – 4:18
2. "Catalyst" – 6:40
3. "One Day All This Could Be Yours" – 4:19
4. "Massive Bereavement" – 9:59
5. "Rinsed" – 3:58
6. "You Wish" – 6:00
7. "Remember Where You Are" – 5:22
8. "Amputee" – 5:32
9. "Unravel" – 2:50
10. "Women Who Love Men Who Love Drugs" – 8:30
11. "Saturday Morning Breakfast Show" – 9:04
12. "Long Forgotten" – 8:57

== Personnel ==
- Mike Vennart – guitar, vocals
- Steve Durose – guitar, backing vocals
- Richard 'Gambler' Ingram – guitar
- Jon Ellis – bass, keyboards
- Mark Heron – drums

=== Additional personnel ===
- Chris Sheldon – production (with Oceansize), mixing
- Adrian Newton – assistant engineer
- Louis Read – assistant engineer
- Dario Dendi – assistant engineer
- Jack Clark – assistant engineer
- Martin & Kimberly McCarrick – cello, violin, viola on "Massive Bereavement" and "Long Forgotten"
- Claire Lemmon – backing vocals on "Massive Bereavement" and "Saturday Morning Breakfast Show"
