= Serpico (band) =

Punk/Metal band from Edinburgh

Serpico are a punk/metal band from Edinburgh, Scotland. They released their debut album, Neon Wasteland, on 25 May 2009 on WeSaySo Records. A music video for the first single "We Own The Night" was shot at Malvern Hills UK on 14 March 2009. The single was then released on 27 April 2009.

== Discography ==
- Serpico EP (2007)
- Neon Wasteland (WeSaySo, 2009)
- "We Can Rebuild" (2013)
