= Oceansize =

English rock band

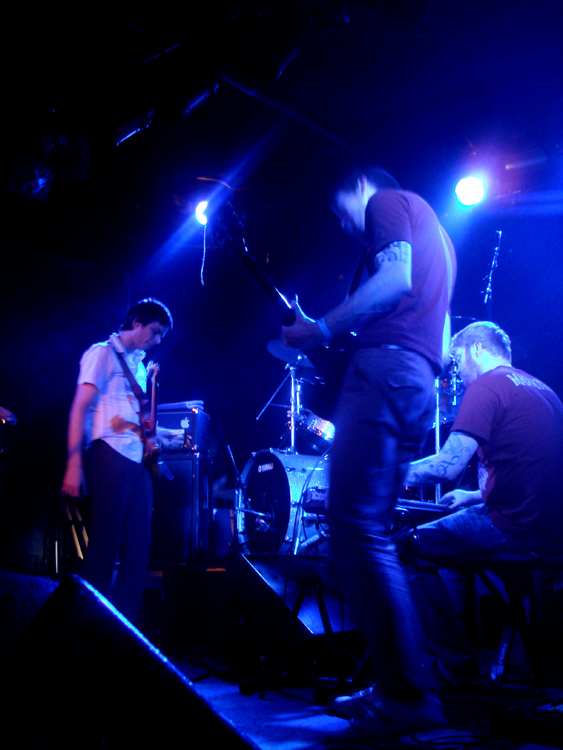
- Oceansize at the LVC, Leiden, in 2008

Background information
- Origin: Manchester
- Genres: New prog; post-rock; alternative rock; space rock
- Years active: 1998–2011
- Labels: Superball; Beggars Banquet
- Past members: Mike Vennart; Steve Durose; Richard "Gambler" Ingram; Mark Heron; Jon Ellis; Steven Hodson
- Website: oceansize.co.uk

Oceansize were an English rock band from Manchester, formed in 1998. The band consisted of Mike Vennart (vocals, guitar), Steve Durose (guitar, backing vocals), Richard "Gambler" Ingram (guitar, keyboards), Mark Heron (drums) and Jon Ellis (bass guitar) for the majority of its career, with Steve Hodson replacing Ellis on bass guitar in 2006.

The band released four studio albums, in addition to a number of EPs and singles, displaying a wide array of influences from several genres including post-rock, math rock, psychedelic rock, and space rock. Following a twelve-year career, Oceansize announced their split in February 2011, with the members moving on to different projects.

== History ==
=== 1998–2000: Formation and early years ===
The band members met each other while attending music college in Salford, where the various members performed in a range of different musical acts very stylistically different from the band they would go on to create. "[The bands were] pretty terrible," said Mike Vennart. "We were in a grunge band. When I met Steve I asked him to be the new guitarist. I wanted to be experimental and unusual and still write pop songs. We were terrible at it. We didn't go anywhere for a while. When we got a new rhythm section, we re-thought what we were doing and got better. We had more vision. Although we don't all like the same music and have different tastes, we can see clearly where our music needs the most work."

The band formed after attending a Mogwai concert during their final year at University. Though known as a Manchester band, Vennart, Gambler and Ellis are originally from Yorkshire, Durose from Birmingham, and Mark Heron is Scottish. Steven Hodson, who joined the band later, is the only member of Oceansize to hail from the Manchester area.

The band subsequently named themselves after Jane's Addiction song, "Ocean Size". According to guitarist Gambler, the band's then-bassist Jon Ellis came up with the name: "I think, at the time, he was thinking what we would sound like. Jane's Nothing's Shocking album, which has the track "Ocean Size" on it, was definitely a big influence."

=== 2000–2004: First EPs and Effloresce ===
Over the next few years, Oceansize would release two self-released EPs Amputee and A Very Still Movement. This in turn led to interest from Beggars Banquet Records, who signed the band in 2000. The band's first release on the label was the Relapse EP titled after a very early composition that had been through many different reworkings.

Oceansize's debut album Effloresce was released on 29 September 2003 on Beggars Banquet. The album spawned the singles "Catalyst", "One Day All This Could Be Yours" and "Remember Where You Are", each of which featured a music video. The album garnered considerable critical acclaim, with music critic Ben Hogwood stating that: "with their broad harmonic language and fluctuating rhythms it's difficult to give an alternative to Oceansize, which is always a good sign. If pushed I would say they've taken a good liking to '70s rock but taken on board the works of bands such as Muse and The Cooper Temple Clause, along with the more expansive end of Seattle grunge music.".

=== 2005–2006: Everyone Into Position and line-up change ===
Two years later, the band released their second album, Everyone Into Position on 19 September 2005. The album track "Meredith" was featured on the popular television drama The O.C., and one of the album's singles, "Music For A Nurse", became the soundtrack to an Orange advertising campaign entitled Fish during summer 2006. "Music For A Nurse" was also featured in the motion picture The Invisible (2007), and both "Music For A Nurse" and "Meredith" have also been used in the BBC drama series Waterloo Road.

On the writing process for the record Vennart said "The writing process itself was interesting, we’d bought a computer and some mics and were making decent demos on our own, much to the delight of our record company. We started writing ‘onscreen’ for the first time ever. Songs like ‘Heaven Alive’ and ‘Meredith’ were pieced together. Steve worked up a 4-track demo for what became ‘Dirty Sweet Smell Of The Summer’. I brought in the chords for parts of ‘Charm Offensive’ and we designed it from scratch as the opening song. The whole album was, from my point of view, designed as the ideal festival headline set. We all went to Glastonbury every year and had some super-drugged up experience watching Radiohead or The Flaming Lips or Mogwai or Cardiacs or whoever. We, or rather i, wanted something that would work on that level. Yeah i know; i was smoking a lot of weed back then."

Oceansize had mixed views on the album as a whole. Despite the band's view on the record, critics and fans generally praised the release. The lukewarm review the album received from Pitchfork was the one that seemed to be the most consistent with the band's own thoughts on it. The review singled out the album's more progressive tracks such as "You Can't Keep a Bad Man Down" and "Ornament/The Last Wrongs" for praise while criticizing songs such as "Heaven Alive" for sticking too closely to alt rock conventions that the reviewer ultimately felt was holding the band back. Despite this, Mike Vennart has stated frequently that Everyone Into Position is his favourite Oceansize album.

Following the release of Everyone Into Position, Oceansize subsequently left Beggars Banquet. The band sought a new record deal that would better support the band in terms of promotion and financial backing for international touring. Mike Vennart implied in a recent interview that the record deal was contingent on the band writing two tracks "on order" for the company. These mp3s were released on the band's Myspace page around Christmas 2006 as a band-described gift to the fans. The two songs were "Red Rag to a Bear" and "Siberian Bullshit". In the posting of these mp3s, Vennart described these tracks as "warts an' all," and suggested that they would not show up on the new album.

On moving to new label, Superball Music, Vennart described the move as a chance for the band to move forward: "we reached a point when we'd gone as far as we could [with Beggars Banquet]. We needed a new home and these guys offered it to us on a plate. We're the only band on the label at the moment, so they can't do enough for us."

Everyone Into Position marked the final appearance of bassist Jon Ellis. On 4 December 2005, the band issued a press release, stating that Ellis was leaving the band, but would still contribute musically. On 16 January 2006 frontman Mike Vennart issued a short post on an Oceansize messageboard announcing Ellis' replacement, Steve Hodson – a member of the Oceansize side-project Kong and also the drummer in Capulet.

=== 2007–2009: Frames ===
The band's third album, Frames, was released on 1 October 2007 on Superball Music. Artwork for the album was provided by Robin Finck of Nine Inch Nails and Guns N' Roses. Originally entitled The Frame, the band elected to alter the name slightly after an incidental suggestion; Vennart explained that "one of our friends, who's in Future of the Left, said 'I love the title... Frames, isn't it?' We just thought, 'well it wasn't, but that's a lot better. It's an angular title, it evokes strength and structure and it's quite cinematic." The album was trailed as featuring "a lot of songs about grudges and negative energy", with the song "Commemorative 9/11 T-Shirt", inspired by a gift to Vennart by band Cardiacs, which includes a time signature of "11/8 or 9/8, so when we were naming the song it was like 'it's in 11, it's in 9, it's got to be 9/11".

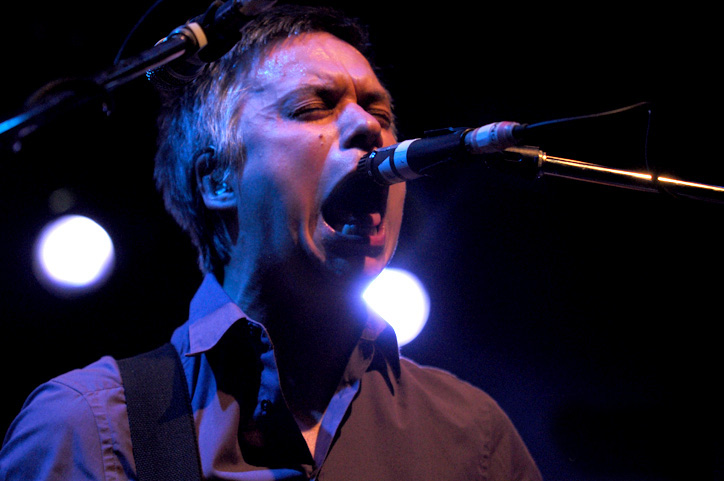
Oceansize playing in Fremantle, 2009

In May and June 2009, Oceansize supported Sydney band Cog on a national tour of Australia, along with other support act Calling All Cars, playing a string of dates which included shows in capital cities Sydney, Melbourne, Adelaide & Brisbane. Of the tour, Mike Vennart spoke of the excitement, saying "from the moment (the tour) was mentioned, I was just hammering our manager, going 'make it happen!'"

On the 1 August 2009, the band played the Sonisphere festival at Knebworth, joining Linkin Park, Metallica, Nine Inch Nails, Alice in Chains and more for the weekend festival. On the 21 August 2009, Oceansize supported Biffy Clyro at the Edinburgh Corn Exchange and the reformed Faith No More on the 25th

The band released a live box set in September 2009, entitled Feed to Feed. The release is limited to 5000 copies. The live recordings are taken from a series of shows the band performed on three consecutive nights at the Roadhouse in Manchester. The band played each of their three studio albums from start to finish, one album each night, including related b-sides. The boxset contains three DVDs and four CDs.

=== 2009–2010: Home & Minor and Self Preserved While the Bodies Float Up ===
A new EP, entitled Home and Minor, was released in October 2009. On the EP, Vennart has explained that the band have adopted a particular stylistic approach on the record.

The band started working on their fourth (and ultimately final) album, Self Preserved While the Bodies Float Up in fall 2009. In January 2010, the band embarked upon a UK tour, showcasing new material. According to Mike Vennart's Twitter, the recording of the album was completed on 17 April, with Vennart stating "Recording is complete! Album 4 is go! It's all on Chris Sheldon now". Mastering was completed at Abbey Road Studios on 18 May 2010 by Sean Magee. On 22 July 2010, Oceansize posted one of the album's songs, "SuperImposer", on their Superball website, and made it available for download via Twitter and Facebook.

Self Preserved While the Bodies Float Up was released on 6 September 2010. The album showcased a heavier side to the band, who stated that it probably was their heaviest studio album to date. However, Vennart claimed that the album still had the diversity found on other Oceansize albums. The band subsequently toured to promote the release.

=== 2011: Band break-up ===
On 25 February 2011, Oceansize announced via the band's Twitter and Facebook pages that they had split up. No explanations were provided. In an interview a year later in 2012, Vennart commented "It's tricky. I'd kind of like to tell the story but it's pretty dramatic. It would alter the sound of the records that we spent ages dreaming up, and to some people it might sound all a little petty. But it was so fucking ugly. Suffice to say it was a recurring problem that grew and grew and it couldn't be ignored or tolerated anymore." On 31 May 2013 Vennart finally put an end to most speculation via a post on Twitter, stating that after a disastrous band performance at a concert in Warsaw on 23 October 2010, Gambler had quit Oceansize and that this had broken up the band. In reply to a fan who tweeted a video of the performance, in which Mark Heron's drumming seems considerably affected, Vennart commented: "Stay off them drugs, kids".

While Vennart refused to blame any individuals in particular, he had previously said (in a May 2012 interview with the music blog Undersong) that persistent drug abuse by at least one band member had undermined Oceansize and led to the circumstances surrounding the split: "Whilst Oceansize had no delusions of grandeur, there were those in the band that just weren't up to the job. Put it like this, when you watch Biffy Clyro live you can rest assured that they are pretty much stone-cold sober. They're certainly not drunk, stoned, on downers or tripping their tits off ... They're easy to play for cos they know how to play the songs and they play them correctly every single night. There's an inherent trust there. There's also a respect for their audience – they understand that their fans may have travelled miles, saved up money for tickets, planned their life around a show. It's this respect for each other and their audience that has stood Biffy in good stead and it has helped take them to the top. That mindset has to be in place before you even consider a setlist. This respect and these qualities were, I'm sad to say, not consistent in the ranks of Oceansize. Even if the opportunity had ever presented itself, Oceansize simply was not allowed to move forward. Whenever we had to step up to the challenge, the same fucking turd was on the doorstep."

While Vennart has pointed to Heron's Warsaw performance as the primary impetus, Gambler also pointed to the end of a long-term relationship as a factor in his decision to quit the band. Gambler does not rule out a reunion in the future, though he does not believe it will happen any time soon. Vennart stated on Twitter in 2020 about the prospect of a reunion: "With every passing year, the inclination fades, the proposed fee grows. It'll never be enough." He also stated "It's been a very long time. Believe it or not, I'm a romantic kind of guy and I love the idea of a reunion show just like you do. But fuck, it would be tough."

== Post-Oceansize ==
Following the breakup of Oceansize, various members went on to other work or continued with side projects which they had begun prior to the split. Gambler (under his real name of Richard A. Ingram) had already begun a solo career in parallel to Oceansize, while Steve Hodson and Mark Heron continued with Kong (and Hodson continued his ongoing solo work as Mild Eyes). In 2011, Gambler, Mike Vennart and Steve Durose took on work as touring musicians for other bands – Vennart and Gambler with Biffy Clyro in guitar and keyboard respectively, Durose with Amplifier. Durose joined Amplifier full-time in 2011, playing on the albums Echo Street (2013), Mystoria (2014), and Trippin' with Dr. Faustus (2017).

Further post-Oceansize projects emerged quickly after the breakup. Steve Hodson worked with the band Chandelier Swing while Mark Heron worked with improv band Shamefaced and released new music under his Kong alias of "Krem". Mike Vennart and Gambler reunited in the duo British Theatre, who have since released two EPs, EP (2012) and Dyed In the Wool Ghost (2012), and a full-length album, Mastery (2016). Vennart has released four solo albums, The Demon Joke (2015), To Cure a Blizzard Upon a Plastic Sea (2018), In the Dead, Dead Wood (2020) and Forgiveness & The Grain (2024).

In 2023, Vennart formed the heavy metal band Empire State Bastard alongside Biffy Clyro singer and guitarist Simon Neil. Their first album, Rivers of Heresy, was released in September 2023.

In 2025, Vennart joined the band Cardiacs as their new guitarist and lead vocalist, replacing Tim Smith, he contributed to the band's latest album, "LSD", and is confirmed to participate in the group's future musical projects as well.

== Style, influences and creative process ==
Associates of UK groups such as Amplifier, Biffy Clyro and Aereogramme, earlier in their career, Oceansize were also frequently grouped in with the space rock movement that had gained some underground popularity at the time – essentially heavy alternative rock with shoegaze leanings. One of the band's earliest major tours was with Cave In from Massachusetts, U.S., who they were frequently compared to especially in their earlier years. Oceansize often described their music as "progressive death indie". Durose said of the term, "I like that. It's pretty cool. Mike came up with that, and it's better than new prog."

Oceansize described eclectic sources of inspiration. Gambler has attested that everyone in the band had "such diverse influences. I think it would be a list a mile long. The obvious ones, especially for me, would be Radiohead, Mogwai, Aphex Twin, Nine Inch Nails and Tool; I think I could probably go on all day. I mean if you looked at our record collection you probably wouldn't think it."

An often-stated influence is Cardiacs, whose leader Tim Smith produced the Relapse EP in 2002. Vennart has said of the band, "It wasn’t until I saw Cardiacs three times that I realised they are the greatest band of them all. I don’t say that lightly. There’s simply no-one like them [...] once you understand them, and have felt them in your heart, you will struggle to find anything that will ever come so close for the rest of your life." In 2002, Oceansize supported Cardiacs at the London Astoria, and came on stage during Cardiacs' set to cover their song "Eat It Up Worms Hero". In 2010, Oceansize contributed a cover of "Fear" by Tim Smith's Spratleys Rats (formerly Spratleys Japs) to the tribute album Leader of the Starry Skies: A Tribute to Tim Smith, Songbook 1. The album was released to raise funds for Smith's ongoing care and recovery after a heart attack in 2008.

Another influence is Black Sabbath, of whom Vennart said: "It’s impossible to quantify what this band means to me. I can literally bring myself to tears imagining what would’ve become of me had they never existed. They were my first musical obsession from age 8, and they haven’t left me throughout this whole topsy turvy freakshow of a life." The title of the Oceansize song "I/B/O/W" is an abbreviation of the surnames of each member of Black Sabbath's original lineup (Tony Iommi/Geezer Butler/Ozzy Osbourne/Bill Ward).

Oceansize often stated that the bulk of their writing was the product of fruitful jam sessions, with Steve Durose saying after the release of Effloresce that "our sound has just evolved really, but right from the first rehearsal, we kind of had it in the bag. We were on mushrooms and just jammed for ages, and then we listened back to the tapes. About three songs from Effloresce were born in that one rehearsal, and we just realized we had something special happening. Everything comes from jams, though. That's the way we write." In regards to structure and time signature, Durose cites drummer Mark Heron as a key collaborator; "Mark's very into strange beats, so what will start off as a very simple idea, once it's been through the Oceansize washing machine will come out as something sounding quite bizarre at the other end." Gambler has advocated a 'no strings' approach with the creative process, saying that "I think we have been tied into the whole progressive thing for quite a bit now. When we formed the band we didn't think we were going to be this or that sort of band. We're forward thinking as far as our music is concerned".

Vennart and Gambler have both regularly stated that the album Alloy, by electronic experimental band Silo, is an influence on their work.

== Legacy ==
Since their breakup, Oceansize have been cited as an influence by a wide variety of artists. Russian band iamthemorning took their name from the Oceansize song "I Am the Morning". The title of 2018 album Effloresce by American band Covet was an homage to the album of the same name by Oceansize. Other bands and artists who have cited them as an influence include Charlie Barnes, Rose Kemp, The Longcut, The Pineapple Thief, Rosetta, Black Peaks, and Alpha Male Tea Party. Among the artists who have expressed admiration for their work are Steven Wilson of Porcupine Tree, who ranked Everyone Into Position and Frames as two of his favourite albums of the 2000s, and Mike Portnoy of Dream Theater, calling them "probably the best [band] in the alternative-prog vein". Sleep Token have also mentioned Oceansize as a key influence on their sound.

== Side projects and collaborations ==
Oceansize shared camaraderie with the fellow Mancunian band Amplifier, who referred to Oceansize as "Amplifier's brothers-in-amps". Mike Vennart and Steve Durose supplied backing vocals on two tracks on Amplifier's self-titled debut album. Vennart also provided backing vocals for their 2010 album The Octopus. Amplifier's front-man Sel Balamir produced and mixed the Oceansize EP A Very Still Movement, also contributing guitar to the song "Sizeofanocean". Balamir also co-mixed the Relapse EP in 2002.

Kong (consisting of Steven Hodson and Mark Heron) recorded their debut album Snake Magnet in the summer of 2007 at The Works Recording Studio in Bredbury (where Oceansize recorded Everyone Into Position). Kong signed with Los Angeles-based label White Drugs, home of The Bronx and released Snake Magnet in 2009, with two singles preceding the release (on Brew Records). Hodson later formed the band Rubbing with fellow Kong bandmate Jon-Lee Martin on guitar/vocals and Charlie Hartley (Then Thickens/Boy Genius) on drums, with Hodson on bass/vocals. Their debut EP, Vocal Harmony Trio, was released on March 4, 2022.

Under his real name of Richard A. Ingram, Gambler released a solo album, Consolamentum, in May 2010 on a small Manchester label called WhiteBox. He has also sometimes played bass guitar with the post-punk band Pocketknife, and released a couple of CD-Rs independently consisting of solo piano music.

In 2010, Mike Vennart joined long-time friends Biffy Clyro as the band's second guitarist on all live dates. He has continued to play as a Biffy Clyro touring musician and supplied additional guitar and vocals for their 2013 album Opposites. Gambler also joined the Biffy Clyro live band in 2012.

On May 7, 2010, Steven Hodson filled in as bassist of Future of the Left as the short-term replacement for the recently departed Kelson Mathias. He later co-wrote their song "Dry Hate", which appeared on the Polymers Are Forever EP.

In 2014 Hodson formed the band USA Nails with ex Hawk Eyes drummer Matt Reid, Gareth Thomas of Silent Front, Stuart Plant from Death Pedals and Daniel Holloway of Dead Arms. They have released six albums, Sonic Moist (2014), No Pleasure (2016), Shame Spiral (2017), Life Cinema (2019), Character Stop (2020) and Feel Worse (2024).

On May 1, 2017, Hodson and his USA Nails bandmate Daniel Holloway launched the Sad Tapes label with the release of Dead Arms' 4 Track Masters EP. They said of the label: "SAD TAPES record and release music for those who prefer the quality of demos or live sessions. No fuss, no frills." Ex-bassist Jon Ellis is recording and producing tracks from underground Manchester band "The Marivaux".

Durose has produced two albums by Charlie Barnes (Bastille/Amplifier), More Stately Mansions (2015), and Oceanography (2018). Barnes described working with Durose as "a bona fide teenage dream" in the liner notes of Oceanography.

In 2021, Vennart and Durose contributed gang vocals to the KK's Priest album Sermons of the Sinner.

== Members ==
- Mike Vennart – lead vocals, guitar, bass (1998–2011)
- Steve Durose – guitar, backing vocals (1998–2011)
- Richard "Gambler" Ingram – guitar, keyboards (1998–2011)
- Jon Ellis – bass, keyboards (1998–2005)
- Steven Hodson – bass, keyboards, guitar (2006–2011)
- Mark Heron – drums (1998–2011)

== Discography ==
Studio albums

- Effloresce (2003)
- Everyone into Position (2005)
- Frames (2007)
- Self Preserved While the Bodies Float Up (2010)

EPs

- Amputee (1999)
- A Very Still Movement (2001)
- Relapse (2002) – UK No. 99 UK Indie No. 27
- Music for Nurses (2004)
- Home & Minor (2009)

Box sets and deluxe editions

- Frames Deluxe Edition (2008, includes Frames Live DVD recorded in Manchester in 2007 and other extras)
- Feed to Feed (2009, recorded between October 16 and 18, 2008, at the Roadhouse, Manchester (UK))
- Frames Reissue (2024, includes three LPs, two bonus tracks, 8-page pull out, essay, and previously unreleased photographs)

Singles

- "Saturday Morning Breakfast Show" (1999) (7-inch Vinyl Only, includes Amputee)
- "One Day All This Could Be Yours" (2003) (CD/10" Vinyl, includes Breed Siamese and Massive Bereavement (Live), live track recorded at The Witchwood, Ashton-under-Lyne, 31/12/02) UK Indie No. 30
- "Catalyst" (2003) (Single/Maxi-Single/Vinyl/Download, some versions includes Breed Siamese or Women Who Love Men Who Love Drugs (Live), live track recorded at The Witchwood, Ashton-under-Lyne, 31 December 2002) UK No. 73 UK Indie No. 13
- "Remember Where You Are" (2003) (CD/7" Vinyl, includes I Haven't Been... ...The Claw For Ages) UK No. 94 UK Indie No. 20
- "Heaven Alive" (2005) (CD/7" Vinyl, includes The Dirty Sweet Smell Of The Summer and/or I/B/O/W) UK No. 78
- "New Pin" (2006) (CD/7" Vinyl, includes Superfluous To Requirements or Emp(irical) Error) – UK Indie No. 20
- "Walking in the Air" (Cover version) (2007) (Free Christmas Single, Web Only)
- "SuperImposer" (2010) (7-inch Vinyl/Digital Download, includes Ransoms (RAi Reboot))

B-Sides/Bonus Tracks

- "Ebb" – 11:05 (from Amputee)
- "A Very Still Movement" – 3:26 (from A Very Still Movement)
- "Sizeofanocean" – 5:19 (from A Very Still Movement)
- "Relapse" – 10:14 (from Relapse, later version of Ebb)
- "Breed Siamese" 7:04 (from Catalyst or One Day All This Could Be Yours)
- "I Haven't Been... ...The Claw for Ages" 5:48 (from Remember Where You Are)
- "The Dirty Sweet Smell of the Summer" 6:47 (from Heaven Alive)
- "I/B/O/W" 4:31 (from Heaven Alive)
- "Superfluous to Requirements" 5:52 (from New Pin)
- "Ransoms (RAi Reboot)" 3:58 (from SuperImposer)
- "Siberian Bullshit", "Red Rag to a Bear" (demo) (Frames demos released on bands' Myspace space)
- "Voorhees" 11:10 (from Frames Digipak)
- "Intro", "Ketemine Van", "Scribble Pad", "Day Off", "Only Twin Strings", and "Savant Strings" (from 'Frames Live' DVDAudio)
- "Ransoms" (RAi Reboot) 3:58 (from SuperImposer)
- "Cloak" 3:39 (from Self Preserved While the Bodies Float Up special edition)
- "Massive Bereavement" (Live) [Recorded at The Witchwood, Ashton-under-Lyne, 31/12/02] (from One Day All This Could Be Yours)
- "Women Who Love Men Who Love Drugs" (Live) [Recorded live at The Witchwood, Ashton-under-Lyne, 31 December 2002)] (from Catalyst)

Music videos

- "One Day All This Could Be Yours" (2003)
- "Catalyst" (2003)
- "Heaven Alive" (2005)
- "New Pin" (2006)
- "Legal Teens" (2009)
- "SuperImposer" (2010)

Other appearances

- "Fear" (Tim Smith's Spratleys Rats cover) (Leader of the Starry Skies: A Tribute to Tim Smith, Songbook 1) (2010)
- "Fear" (as above) (Stoneage Dinosaurs / Fear, split 7-inch single with Steven Wilson) (2011)
