= Superball Music =

German independent record label

- Parent company: InsideOut Music
- Founded: 2007
- Founder: Thomas Waber
- Status: Active
- Distributor: Sony Music
- Genre: Alternative rock, progressive rock
- Country of origin: Germany
- Location: Kleve
- Official website: superballmusic.com

Superball Music is a German independent record label. Launched on 1 October 2007, the label is still active as of April 2024. It has previously partnered with Century Media Records and EMI.

== History ==
Superball has attracted significant attention for bringing out Oceansize's third studio album Frames, which was a commercial success, and for signing ...And You Will Know Us by the Trail of Dead, in advance of their upcoming album due in February 2009. That same year, Superball and Inside Out became partners with Century Media Records, which secured a worldwide distribution contract with EMI.

Long Distance Calling, the Australian heavy-metal band, as well as Cog and Pure Reason Revolution have worked with Superball Music. The only other bands to have signed to Superball Music so far are German progressive bands The Amber Light, Caesars Rome, upcoming British act that penned the deal with Superball, and released their debut album The Company We Keep in 2012. The music label has also signed a contract with Just Like Vinyl, in the summer of 2012. In September 2012, Bright Black Heaven was released on Superball Music.

Oceanography, an album by Charlie Barnes, was released on Superball Music in March 2018.

== Artists ==
- 65daysofstatic
- Amplifier
- ...And You Will Know Us by the Trail of Dead
- Blaqk Audio
- Caesars Rome
- Charlie Barnes
- Cog
- Dredg
- Flood Of Red
- InMe
- Long Distance Calling
- Matt Skiba And The Sekrets
- Maybeshewill
- Oceansize
- Pure Reason Revolution
- Rooney
- Three Trapped Tigers
- Toundra
- Vennart
