= List of controversial album art =

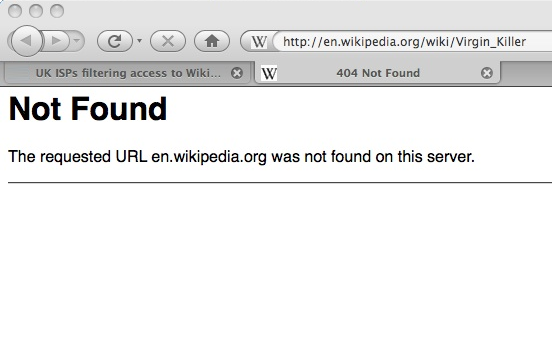
The perceived pedophiliac nature of the cover artwork for Virgin Killer led to the Wikipedia page on the album being blocked by the Internet Watch Foundation

The following is a list of notable albums with controversial album art, especially where that controversy resulted in the album being banned, censored or sold in packaging other than the original one. They are listed by the type of controversy they were involved in.

== Nudity and sexuality ==
- Alice Cooper – Love It to Death (1971)
  - The album features a portrait of the original Alice Cooper band, with the frontman posing with his thumb protruding from underneath his cape as if it were his penis. The album was later reissued with Cooper's entire right arm airbrushed out of the photograph.
- Arca – Xen (2014)
  - The album cover shows a computer-generated androgynous alter-ego named Xen. With her head tilted back, Xen displays her broad shoulders, breasts, and large hips on the album cover with her skin rippling "as if about to peel and fall off". Even though no genitals appear, YouTube, Spotify and iTunes pixelate the area, as well as the breasts.
- Biffy Clyro – The Vertigo of Bliss (2003)
  - The cover shows a woman sitting down with her hand up her dress masturbating with a look of pleasure on her face. The controversy of the album cover is accompanied by the erotic artwork of the singles "The Ideal Height", "Questions and Answers" and "Eradicate the Doubt" (all designed by Milo Manara). Despite being considered offensive and sexist by some, ShortList magazine praised the band for their bravery and originality when they mentioned it in their list of "50 Coolest Album Covers Ever".
- The Black Crowes – Amorica (1994)
  - The album cover originally showed a woman's crotch wearing a thong with a United States flag pattern on it with pubic hair visible. The image was recycled from a 1976 issue of Hustler magazine. After the album was rejected by certain stores due to the cover, the image was replaced with a black background cover which blacked out the hair and only showed the garment.
- Blind Faith – Blind Faith (1969)
  - The cover features a topless pubescent girl, holding in her hands a silver space ship, which some perceived as phallic. Photographer Bob Seidemann used a girl, Mariora Goschen, who was 11 years old. The US record company issued it with an alternative cover that showed a photograph of the band on the front.
- Bon Jovi – Slippery When Wet (1986)
  - The album originally was to feature a busty woman in a yellow shirt featuring the album title. The reason for the switch is unknown, but some think the label feared stores would not sell it, deeming the cover sexist, while others said Jon Bon Jovi scrapped the cover when he saw the record company put a bright pink border around the photograph that the band had submitted. Instead, the cover was changed before the album's release to an image of a wet garbage bag with the words "Slippery When Wet" written on it. However, the Japanese edition of the album features the original artwork.

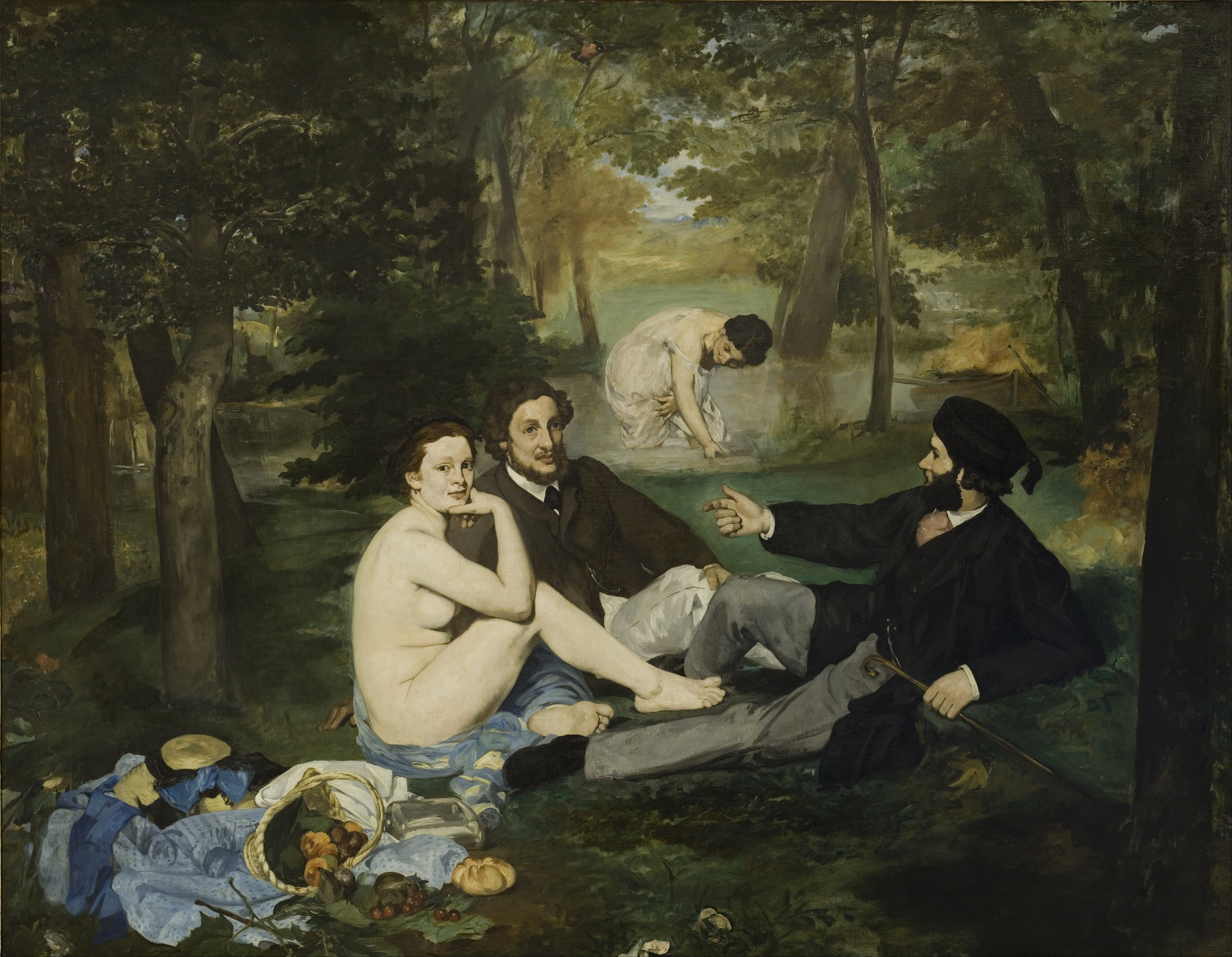
The painting Le Déjeuner sur l'herbe, which Bow Wow Wow recreated with their 14-year old singer as the nude woman, leading to considerable controversy.

- Bow Wow Wow – See Jungle! See Jungle! Go Join Your Gang Yeah, City All Over! Go Ape Crazy! (1981)
  - The cover of the album is a photograph of the band members recreating Édouard Manet's painting Le Déjeuner sur l'herbe. The band's then-14-year old lead singer, Annabella Lwin, is shown nude on the cover. The artwork caused outrage in the United Kingdom that led to an investigation by Scotland Yard, instigated by Lwin's mother. The cover was replaced, and never appeared on the American issue. The cover art was reused for the 1982 follow-up EP The Last of the Mohicans.
- Chumbawamba – Anarchy (1994)
  - The cover originally depicted a baby's head emerging from a woman's vagina during birth. As some stores would not sell the album due to the cover, the baby image was replaced with an image of several flowers.
- Cradle of Filth – Thornography (2006)
  - In news posted on the official Cradle of Filth website in mid-May 2006, it was revealed that the planned artwork for Thornography had been vetoed by Roadrunner Records. A replacement was soon forthcoming, although numerous CD booklets had already been printed with the original image. The controversy was over the nakedness of the female figure's legs on the original cover.
- David Bowie – Diamond Dogs (1974)
  - The album features Bowie as a half-dog half-man hybrid, and the back cover features the creature's genitals. Following controversy, later copies of the album have the genitals airbrushed out of the painting.
- Dead Kennedys – Frankenchrist (1985)
  - A poster inserted in the original record sleeve, H. R. Giger's Landscape #XX, or Penis Landscape, was a painting depicting rows of genitals in sexual intercourse. The band and its record label Alternative Tentacles were brought to criminal trial for distributing harmful matter to minors. Although the trial and two years of subsequent litigation in the case did not result in any convictions, Alternative Tentacles and the band's frontman Jello Biafra were nearly driven into bankruptcy as a result of costs related to the trial and litigation. Additionally, the album's actual cover – a 1970s Newsweek photograph of Shriners in a parade – prompted a 1986 lawsuit from the four elderly Shriners included in the photograph.
- Death Grips – No Love Deep Web (2012)
  - The cover shows the erect penis of drummer Zach Hill with the album's title written across it in black marker. The cover caused such controversy, along with its spontaneous release without their label's permission, which the band were forced to put a disclaimer on their website. An alternative cover was subsequently released depicting lead vocalist MC Ride wearing socks with the words "Suck my dick" on them.
- Duran Duran – "Skin Trade" (1987)
  - The original sleeve, known as the "bum" cover, depicts a closeup of a woman's buttocks (though the ability to distinguish it by eye is relatively difficult without prior contextual knowledge from the viewer). It was banned in the UK, although it was released in France.
- Flux of Pink Indians – The Fucking Cunts Treat Us Like Pricks (1984)
  - In addition to the use of profanity in the album title, the album art depicts three crudely drawn erect penises. Greater Manchester Police, under the leadership of James Anderton, seized copies of the album from Eastern Bloc Records and charged the band and their record labels with obscenity, although the charges were dropped. In addition, many stores, such as HMV, declined to stock it.
- Frenzal Rhomb – Dick Sandwich (1994)
  - The cover shows a drawing of several severed penises, some of which are being used as filling in a sandwich. They were subsequently banned from some venues and record stores.
- Funkadelic – The Electric Spanking of War Babies (1981)
  - Pedro Bell's original cover, which showed a nude woman inside a phallic spacecraft, was considered too suggestive by Warner Bros. Records, which paid Bell to cover the offending parts with a green shape.
- Guns N' Roses – Appetite for Destruction (1987)
  - The album's original cover art, based on Robert Williams' painting Appetite for Destruction, depicted an open-shirted woman leaning against a wooden fence after evidently being sexually assaulted by a robotic figure which is about to be crushed by a dagger-toothed monster. After several music retailers refused to stock the album, the label compromised and moved the offending image to the inside sleeve, replacing it with a new image depicting a cross and skulls of the five band members. The band stated the artwork is "a symbolic social statement, with the robot representing the industrial system that's raping and polluting our environment".
- The Hotelier – Goodness (2016)
  - The album cover shows a group of middle-aged nudists posing in the middle of a forest. The group consists of five women and three men. The album cover was completely pixelated for its iTunes release, and many online news outlets overlaid a black box over the explicit areas.

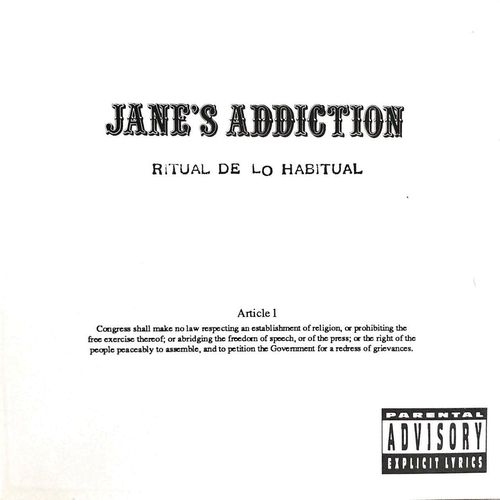
The replacement cover for Ritual de lo Habitual.

- Jane's Addiction – Nothing's Shocking (1988)
  - The album cover, a sculpture of nude conjoined twins with their hair on fire, caused several distributors to ban the album.
- Jane's Addiction – Ritual de lo Habitual (1990)
  - The original album artwork depicts frontman Perry Farrell engaging in a threesome. It was replaced in some stores by a text-only cover that stated the band's name, the album title, and the First Amendment.
- The Jimi Hendrix Experience – Electric Ladyland (1968)
  - The intended artwork for the UK version of the album did not arrive in time to press the album, so a cover of naked women lounging in front of a black background was issued in its place.
- John Lennon & Yoko Ono – Unfinished Music No.1: Two Virgins (1968)
  - The front cover displayed Lennon and Ono frontally nude, while the rear cover featured them from behind. Distributors were prompted to sell the album in a plain brown wrapper, and copies of the album were impounded as obscenity in several jurisdictions.
- Kanye West – "Cold" (2012) (single)
  - The cover designed by George Condo features a woman's body with bare breasts. It was intended to be the cover art of the song when the name was "Theraflu". When Kanye West changed the name of the song to "Cold", a new cover was revealed, which also caused controversies for bare breasts.
- Kanye West – My Beautiful Dark Twisted Fantasy (2010)
  - The cover originally showed a painting by George Condo depicting West being straddled by a phoenix. After certain retail stores refused to sell the album due to the cover, Condo created a less-offensive artwork, showing a ballerina with a glass of cherry juice. However, many versions of the album still feature the original artwork, but pixelated.
- Kanye West – Vultures 1 (2024)
  - The cover displays West wearing an all-black outfit, standing next to his wife, Bianca Censori, who has her back to the camera and is mostly nude above her thighs and wearing black stockings and high heels.
- Led Zeppelin – Houses of the Holy (1973)
  - The Hipgnosis cover, based on the novel Childhood's End by Arthur C. Clarke, features a group of naked children ascending the Giant's Causeway. The interior art also depicts a distant figure of a naked Overlord standing on mossy ruins (near Dunluce Castle) while holding one of the children aloft in a ceremonial gesture. Although the album was originally released with the nudity intact, Atlantic Records were allowed to add a wrap-around paper title band to US and UK copies of the sleeve that had to be broken or slid off to access the record. This hid the children's buttocks from the general display, but still, the album was either banned or unavailable in some parts of the Southern United States for several years. On the subsequent cover, one of the naked children's buttocks was covered with the text "Led Zeppelin Houses of the Holy" printed on a white background. The buttocks were later airbrushed out.
- Lady Gaga – Artpop (2013)
  - The album artwork is a sculpture of Lady Gaga by Jeff Koons with her legs open and a gazing ball placed between them. Although no nudity is visible on the artwork, the album cover was still censored in the Middle East and China. Rather than traditional censorship, the gazing ball between her legs was enlarged to fully cover her breasts, and her legs were colored black so they did not appear to be naked.
- Lady Gaga – "Do What U Want" featuring R. Kelly (2013) (single)
  - The single cover is a close-up of Lady Gaga's buttocks wearing a blue, floral thong. Lady Gaga's blonde wig hangs just above her thong-clad buttocks. The image was taken by photographer Terry Richardson. A censored version of the cover featuring a pale mauve coloured skirt edited over the top of her buttocks was used in selected countries in the Middle East.
- Lorde – Solar Power (2021)
  - The album cover is a photograph of Lorde at the beach, taken from below. The photograph shows her naked legs and buttocks. In some markets, including mainland China, Hong Kong, Japan, Saudi Arabia, and the United Arab Emirates, her buttocks are censored by a bright sunlight lens flare.
- Marilyn Manson – Mechanical Animals (1998)
  - The cover shows a picture of a naked Marilyn Manson with airbrushed genitalia. Some retail stores, including Walmart and Kmart, refused to stock the album.
- Ministry – Dark Side of the Spoon (1999)
  - The album's cover depicts a naked obese woman seated in front of a blackboard where the words "I will be god" are written numerous times. The album was banned from Kmart due to the offending cover. In the album's insert, the same woman covers her breasts with her hands, and her behind is also exposed on both the insert and back cover. The woman and the words on the blackboard were later airbrushed out.
- Mom's Apple Pie – Mom's Apple Pie (1972)
  - The album was originally released with the album cover featuring a woman licking her lips and holding a pie with a slice removed showing a subtle depiction of a woman's vulva and some semen leaking from the pie. The cover was later reprinted with the vulva replaced by a miniature brick wall, topped with razor wire and removing the semen.
- Nicki Minaj – "Anaconda" (2014) (single)
  - The artwork for this digital single depicts Minaj with her back towards the camera, emphasizing her thong-clad buttocks. Some stores censored this art by obscuring the buttocks with the Parental Advisory seal, or a black box on the edited version.
- Nirvana – Nevermind (1991)
  - The album cover featured a naked, baby Spencer Elden with his penis exposed, swimming after a dollar bill. Chain stores such as Wal-Mart and Kmart initially refused to carry Nevermind. Frontman Kurt Cobain refused to censor the cover, stating the only form of coverage he would accept was a sticker that read "If you're offended by this, you must be a closet pedophile" over the genitals. Elden sued the band and Cobain's estate 30 years later for perceived child sexual exploitation. Nirvana saw continued controversy for their next album, In Utero.
- NOFX – Heavy Petting Zoo (1996)
  - The album features two covers, one for the CD version and one for the LP version; both of them caused controversy. The CD version features a man sitting down on the ground in a petting zoo cuddling a sheep with his hand on the sheep's genitalia area. The LP version sparked even more controversy than the CD version, as it features the same man in a 69 position with the same sheep. The album is known as Eating Lamb on the LP. The LP version was banned from Germany due to the cover's subject matter.
- Pulp – This Is Hardcore (1998)
  - The sleeve photo, directed by Peter Saville and the American painter John Currin, depicts a naked model, Ksenia Zlobina pictured in a sexual though ambiguous way. Front man Jarvis Cocker believed the picture's concept was that "initially, it would be attractive, you'd look at the picture and realise it's a semi-clad woman. But then her look is vacant. It almost looks as if she could be dead, or a dummy. So, it was supposed to be something that would draw you in and then kind of repel you a bit." Advertising posters showing the album's cover that appeared on the London Underground system were defaced by graffiti artists with slogans like "This Offends Women" and "This is Sexist" or "This is Demeaning".
- Queen - Bicycle Race/Fat Bottomed Girls (1978) (double A-side single)
  - In nearly all countries, the covers featured a backside photo of a naked woman on a racing bike, with a red bikini painted over the original photo. A brassiere was added to the US covers.
- Red Hot Chili Peppers – Mother's Milk (1989)
  - The album cover features a black and white photograph of the band sprawled across the arms of a proportionately larger naked woman. A rose conceals one of her nipples while singer Anthony Kiedis' standing body conceals the other. Several national chains refused to sell the record because they believed the female subject displayed too much nudity. A stricter censored version was manufactured for some retailers that featured the band members in far larger proportion than the original.
- Rob Zombie – Mondo Sex Head (2012)
  - The cover originally featured Sheri Moon Zombie's buttocks, but after controversy arose, it was replaced by an image of a cat, which was referred to by Rob Zombie as a "pussy shot" to replace the "ass shot".
- Roger Waters – The Pros and Cons of Hitch Hiking (1984)
  - The cover features a nude back-view image of model and pornographic actress Linzi Drew, her buttocks clearly visible. It was condemned by many feminist groups and was also accused of promoting rape. Columbia Records was forced to place a black box covering the nudity for future releases to avoid more controversy.
- Roxy Music – Country Life (1974)
  - The album features scantily clad models Constanze Karoli and Eveline Grunwald – the sister and girlfriend, respectively, of Can guitarist Michael Karoli – posed in front of a bush. Although no nudity is directly shown in the photograph, Grunwald is topless and Karoli's bra is translucent, revealing her nipples and areolae. Consequently, the album's LP sleeve was packaged in a green outer nylon bag; for a later American release of the album, the front cover was replaced by mirroring the photograph on the album's back cover, which features the foliage and forest, but neither woman.
- Sabrina Carpenter – Man's Best Friend (2025)
  - The cover features Carpenter posed on her hands and knees in a black mini dress and heels while an anonymous figure, cropped out of the frame, grabs a handful of her hair. The cover generated controversy, with some users on social media calling it "degrading," "disgusting," and "embarrassing." Glasgow Women's Aid, a charity aiming to provide support for victims of domestic abuse, publicly criticized the cover in a Facebook post, calling it "regressive" and "pandering to the male gaze and [promotion of] misogynistic stereotypes" with "an element of violence and control." Carpenter later released an alternative cover that has her holding a man's arm in a formal event, which she joked was "approved by God".
- Scorpions – Virgin Killer (1976)
  - This cover featured a photo of a naked prepubescent girl, with her pubic area partially obscured by a "cracked glass" effect. Her pose and the title Virgin Killer added to the image's notoriety. The Internet Watch Foundation, a British non-profit group who provides content blacklists for major ISPs in the country, also notably blacklisted pages on Wikipedia for featuring the cover on its article about the album. This block was later retracted due to technical problems that occurred as a result of the blocking mechanisms and due to the already "wide availability" of the image.
- Suede – Suede (1993)
  - The gender-ambiguous cover art provoked controversy in the press, prompting Suede frontman Brett Anderson to comment, "I chose it because of the ambiguity of it, but mostly because of the beauty of it." The cover image of the androgynous kissing couple was taken from the 1991 book Stolen Glances: Lesbians Take Photographs edited by Tessa Boffin and Jean Fraser. The photograph was taken by Tee Corinne and in its entirety shows a woman kissing an acquaintance in a wheelchair.
- The Strokes – Is This It (2001)
  - The original cover art featured a photograph of a woman's nude bottom and hip, with a leather-gloved hand suggestively resting on it. Although British retail chains HMV and Woolworths objected to the photograph's controversial nature, they stocked the album without amendment. In the band's native United States, the cover was changed to a photograph of subatomic particle tracks in a bubble chamber. This decision was made by frontman Julian Casablancas because he liked this image more than the original cover, and was independent of any controversy or label demand.
- Sky Ferreira – Night Time, My Time (2013)
  - The album cover features Sky Ferreira appearing topless, wearing a cross necklace inside a shower, with a "demented" facial expression. The album cover was cropped for iTunes, and in-store versions had an elongated sticker with the album title and her name covering the explicit content.
- The The – "Infected" (1986) (single)
  - Released to promote the album of the same name, "Infected" ran into numerous controversies, one of which was the original sleeve, depicting a painting of a masturbating devil. After objections, it was replaced with a close-up of the devil's face. Singer Matt Johnson wrote that the original image was "not supposed to be gratuitous titillation but a distortion on a centuries-old metaphor of the darker side of mankind's emotion."

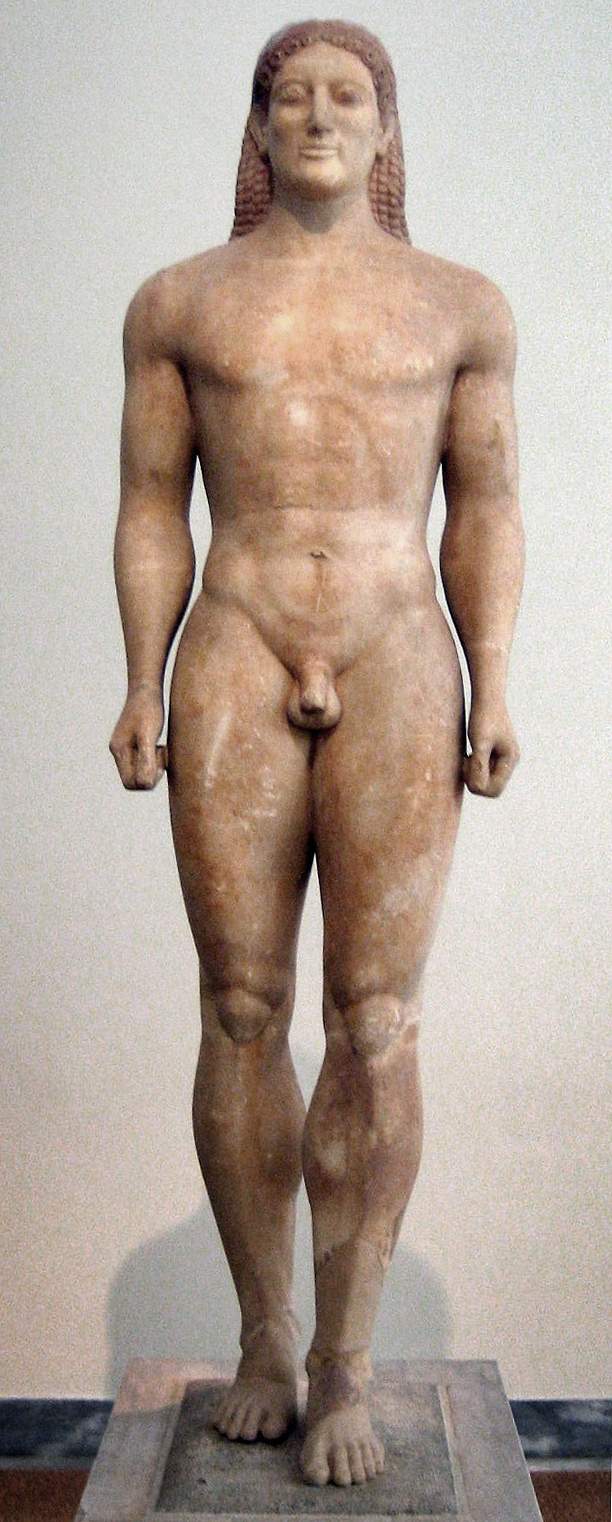
A Kouros. A row of similar statues were featured on the cover of Tin Machine II; their genitalia were airbrushed out on the American release.

- Tin Machine – Tin Machine II (1991)
  - The original cover featured a row of four nude Kouroi. In the U.S., the genitalia of the statues were airbrushed out, leading band member David Bowie to exclaim, "Only in America!"
- Tool – Undertow (1993)
  - Photos in the liner notes of a nude obese woman, a nude man of normal weight, a cow licking its genitals, and the band members with pins in the sides of their heads generated controversy, resulting in the album being removed from stores such as Kmart and Wal-Mart. The cover was later replaced by a giant bar code.
- Type O Negative - The Origin of the Feces (1992)
  - The original cover for this release featured a close-up of vocalist Peter Steele's anus, accompanied by a feces-scented scratch and sniff square. For subsequent reissues, the cover was replaced with a green and black version of the 1493 Michael Wolgemut painting The Dance of Death.
- The Weeknd – House of Balloons (2011) (Mixtape)
  - The explicit cover is a black-and-white image of a topless woman sitting in a tiled room, surrounded and partially obscured by balloons. When the mixtape was sold separately for retail release on iTunes and in stores in 2015, the cover was censored.
- Whitesnake – Lovehunter (1979) and Come an' Get It (1981)
  - The album cover for Lovehunter depicts a naked woman from behind, straddling a large snake, with blood on her hand from a snake bite. Upon its release, the cover was partly covered by a sticker (in the United States) and airbrushing (in Argentina). The Come an' Get It album's cover depicts a white snake trapped inside a glass apple; the snake's open mouth shows its tongue, which is painted to look like a vulva. According to artist Malcolm Horton, this detail was airbrushed out in America.
- White Zombie – Supersexy Swingin' Sounds (1996)
  - The album's cover depicts a naked woman relaxing in a hammock in front of a driveway and a sidewalk. The edited version of the album (audio-wise) has the woman wearing a blue bikini.
- Witchfinder General – Death Penalty (1982) and Friends of Hell (1983)
  - Both albums' covers feature model Joanne Latham in states of undress, being attacked or accosted by men in Medieval and Renaissance period attire. The original concept for Death Penalty was developed by Revolver Music founder Paul Birch. The negative press from the album covers was a large contributing factor in the breakup of the band.

== Religious ==
- Aerosmith – Nine Lives (1997)
  - The original cover art, inspired by a painting in a book by A. C. Bhaktivedanta Swami Prabhupada, features Lord Krishna (with a cat's head and female breasts) dancing on the head of the snake demon, Kāliyā. The Hindu community protested, feeling the artwork was offensive. The band had been unaware of the source of the artwork, and the record company apologized, leading to the next prints removing the art from the cover and booklet. The new cover features a cat tied to a circus knife-thrower's wheel.
- Justin Bieber – Purpose (2015)
  - An alternative cover was reportedly created by Justin Bieber's team for his Purpose album after several Muslim nations across the Middle East, North Africa as well as Indonesia, took issue with Bieber being shirtless in the original artwork and flaunting his cross tattoo, promoting Christianity.
- Christian Death – Sex and Drugs and Jesus Christ (1988)
  - The cover artwork has incited controversy. It depicts an image of Jesus Christ in a self-made tourniquet, injecting heroin. According to Jungle Records' website, the artwork affected the band, leading to a cancellation of shows in Boston. The website claims the artwork was censored in NME and Melody Maker magazine, with the NME rating it a 1 out of 10, saying "may the good lord strike them down."
- The Game – Jesus Piece (2012)
  - The cover features a stained-glass image of an African-American Jesus wearing a red bandanna across his lower face, a Jesus piece necklace, and a teardrop tattoo. After the Roman Catholic Church and several Christians made numerous complaints to Interscope Records co-founder Jimmy Iovine about the artwork, Game decided to use this cover for the album's deluxe edition and use a different cover for the standard edition. The standard cover features a black-and-white photo of the rapper's brother, Jevon Danell Taylor, who was murdered in a gang shooting on May 21, 1995, at the age of 20.
- The Jimi Hendrix Experience – Axis: Bold as Love (1967)
  - Hindu groups in Malaysia expressed anger at both the David King illustrated poster and cover which shows Hendrix and his bandmates as the deity Vishnu. The Malaysian government's Home Ministry instituted a ban on the artwork in June 2014 to protect religious sensitivities.
- Lobão - O Rock Errou (1986)
  - The album cover features the Brazilian musician Lobão, dressed as a Catholic priest, holding a rosary in his hands and beside him, the model and actress Danielle Daumerie, then age 18 years, nude, wearing a veil on her head and with her hands covering private parts. The album was considered controversial at the time of its release in Brazil, being considered an "aberration" by conservative TV host Flávio Cavalcanti.
- Marilyn Manson – Holy Wood (In the Shadow of the Valley of Death) (2000)
  - The cover depicts Manson as a crucified Christ with his jawbone torn off; a statement on censorship and America's obsession with martyrs. The album was sold at Circuit City only after it was housed in a cardboard sleeve featuring an alternative cover, while Walmart and Kmart refused to stock the album at all. A pastor in Memphis, Tennessee also threatened to go on a hunger strike unless the album was pulled from shelves.
- Poison – Open Up and Say... Ahh! (1988)
  - The album art featured a model dressed as a demon with a long red tongue. Arguably more odd than evil or sexual, the cover generated controversy and was later replaced with a censored version that just showed the model's eyes.
- Slayer – Christ Illusion (2006)
  - The cover depicts a mutilated, stoned Christ in a sea of blood with mutilated heads. For stores who refused to sell the album with the original cover, an alternative cover was provided instead. In India, Joseph Dias, general secretary of the Mumbai Christian group Catholic Secular Forum, took "strong exception" to the original album artwork, and issued a memorandum to Mumbai's police commissioner in protest. As a result, all Indian stocks were recalled and destroyed.
- Steve Taylor – I Predict 1990 (1987)
  - The album's cover, influenced by early 20th century French neo-impressionist poster art and painted by Taylor's wife, was controversial with some Christian retailers who instead believed it to be a reference to tarot and New Age philosophy. The album was pulled from several stores as a result. Further controversy was raised by the album track "I Blew Up the Clinic Real Good", which condemned anti-abortion violence. Some Christian bookstores which did not pull the album for its cover pulled it due to the song or its title, either because its critique of the anti-abortion movement offended store owners and customers, or because these same individuals missed the song's satirical point, and believed Taylor advocated such violence.
- The Tough Alliance – A New Chance (2007)
  - Originally, the album opened and closed with a sample of the first verse of Ibrahim, the 14th surah of the Quran, recited by Abdul Basit 'Abd us-Samad. However, a group of Muslims visited the leading singer of the duo, Henning Fürst, and argued that the usage was very offensive. After that discussion, the first verse was removed along with the Arabic imagery on the front cover. On the succeeding copies of the album, the cover was replaced with a barcode.

== Intellectual property infringement ==
The Celtic knot on the cover to Discipline by King Crimson was changed to the above design on later releases due to copyright infringement.

- The Beautiful South – Miaow (1994)
  - The album was originally set to feature a photo of rows of dogs seated in a music hall with a gramophone on the stage. However, retailer HMV made the band withdraw it as it mocked their trademark dog, and the band put out a new cover, depicting four dogs in a boat.
- Bob Dylan – Blonde on Blonde (1966)
  - The original inside gatefold featured nine black-and-white photos, including a shot of actress Claudia Cardinale that Dylan selected from Jerry Schatzberg's portfolio. Since it had been used without her authorization, Cardinale's photo was subsequently removed, making the original record sleeve a collector's item.
- Crystal Castles – Alice Practice (2006)
  - The cover of the EP features artwork by Trevor Brown of Madonna with a black eye. Brown sued the band, claiming that they had used his work without permission. In 2008, Brown and the band came to a settlement in which he was paid for the rights to the image.
- Dead Kennedys – Fresh Fruit for Rotting Vegetables (1980)
  - The album's back cover featured a picture discovered by bassist Klaus Fluoride at a yard sale of an old lounge band called Sounds of Sunshine. The picture was edited with the Dead Kennedys' logo placed onto their drum kit and skulls placed on their instruments. Sounds of Sunshine's former vocalist, Warner Wilder, found out about this and threatened legal action. Initially, the picture was edited to remove the bandmembers' heads, but that was deemed unsatisfactory, and a completely different image of four old people in a living room was used as a replacement. The initial back cover has since been featured on a number of reissues of the album.
- Easyfun – Deep Trouble EP (2015)
  - In December 2023, British conglomerate easyGroup sued Easyfun (real name Finn Keane) over "alleged deliberate misappropiation" of the group's trademarks, including its orange styling. This EP was mentioned in particular due to its original cover, featuring passengers sliding into the ocean on a plane's evacuation slide; the branding seemingly mimicking that used by easyJet. The cover has since been changed to an image of the ocean.
- Fountains of Wayne - Fountains of Wayne (1996)
  - For the European release of this album, the cover image, depicting a young boy clutching a rabbit and posing like a superhero, had to be changed due to the exact same image (taken by British photographer Nick Waplington) having also been used on the cover of the album Plastic Jewels by the British band Flamingoes, which had been released in the United States only two weeks before Fountains of Wayne. Fountains of Wayne vocalist Chris Collingwood would later comment on the matter in a 1997 interview, claiming that "This English photographer licensed the photograph to both bands. Worse than that, he was directly asked by us if he had licensed it to anybody else and he said no. So, basically, the guy's a complete asshole. We're changing the cover in Europe, but we're keeping it the same in the States. It's just too good a picture."
- King Crimson – Discipline (1981)
  - The Celtic knot featured on the original album cover is derivative of a copyrighted design by George Bain and was used without Bain's permission. The band did not know about the copyright problem and elected to commission a new knotwork for later reissues of the record.
- Matchbox Twenty – Yourself or Someone Like You (1996)
  - The album's cover depicts a man with glasses wearing a shirt on his left shoulder and a pilot hat. Frank Torres, the man featured on the cover image sued the band in May 2005, claiming Matchbox Twenty had no permission from him to use his photo on the album's cover and that the photo had been the cause of mental anguish. Torres justified the delay in suing Matchbox Twenty by claiming he had only seen the album photo within the last two years.
- Negativland – U2 (1991)
  - The cover features the record title, U2, in large typeface overlaid by a picture of a Lockheed U-2 spy plane and with the band's name in smaller text beneath the album title. Island Records sued the band, alleging that the cover was misleading and violated trademark law. Additionally, Island sued over the record's unauthorized sampling of U2's song "I Still Haven't Found What I'm Looking For".
- Pink Floyd - Ummagumma (1969)
  - The British version has the Gigi soundtrack album leaning against the wall immediately above the "Pink Floyd" letters. Storm Thorgerson explained that the album was introduced as a red herring to provoke debate, and that it has no intended meaning. On most copies of US and Canadian editions, the Gigi cover is airbrushed to a plain white sleeve, apparently because of copyright concerns, but the earliest US copies do show the Gigi cover, and it was restored for the US remastered CD edition. On the Australian edition, the Gigi cover is completely airbrushed, not even leaving a white square behind.
- Placebo – Placebo (1996)
  - The album cover depicts a young boy, David Fox, pulling his face downward. In 2012, Fox threatened to sue the band due to using the picture without his permission, and it led to bullying and dropping out of school. He stated that the band "ruined his life".
- Richard Pryor – Richard Pryor (1968)
  - The debut album of comedian Richard Pryor was recorded live at The Troubadour in West Hollywood, California. The cover was art-directed and designed by Gary Burden in a style suggestive of a National Geographic cover. According to Burden, "As a result of the Richard Pryor album cover, which I loved doing, I got two letters: One was a letter from the National Geographic Society's attorneys offering to sue me for defaming their publication. The second letter was a Grammy nomination for the best album cover."
- The Rolling Stones – Some Girls (1978)
  - The original pressing of the album featured an inner sleeve containing many black and white photos of both the band members as well as other celebrities, all strategically positioned to show through cut-out holes on the outer sleeve. After protests from some of the persons depicted, the inner sleeve was revised to replace the offending photos with color blocks and text reading Pardon Our Appearance and Cover Under (Re)Construction.
- Sonic Youth – Sister (1987)
  - The album's artwork has been edited two separate times to obscure images; the first of which was a Richard Avedon image depicting a 12-year-old girl, due to a lawsuit threat. The other instance was when an image of the Disney Magic Kingdom was deliberately covered with a barcode, likely due to copyright complaints.
- Sufjan Stevens – Illinois (2005)
  - Shortly after the release of the album, reports arose that DC Comics had issued a cease and desist letter to Stevens' label Asthmatic Kitty because of the depiction of Superman on the cover. However, on October 4, 2005, Asthmatic Kitty announced that there had been no cease and desist letter; the record company's own lawyers had warned about the copyright infringement. On June 30, 2005, Asthmatic Kitty's distributor Secretly Canadian asked its retailers not to sell the album; however, it was not recalled. On July 5, the distributor told its retailers to go ahead and sell their copies, as DC Comics agreed to allow Asthmatic Kitty to sell the copies of the album that were already manufactured, but the image was removed from subsequent pressings. Soon after it was made public that the cover would be changed, copies of the album featuring Superman were sold for as high as $75 on eBay. On the vinyl edition released on November 22, 2005, Superman's image is covered by a balloon sticker. The image of the balloon sticker was also used on the cover of the compact disc and later printings of the double vinyl release.
- Tad – 8-Way Santa (1991)
  - The original cover featured a photograph of a man and woman which had been found in a thrift store. The couple on the album sued for unauthorized use of their image and the cover was replaced on later pressings.
- U2 – No Line on the Horizon (2009)
  - The cover image, Boden Sea by Hiroshi Sugimoto, had previously been used by Richard Chartier and Taylor Deupree for their 2006 album Specification.Fifteen. Deupree called U2's cover "nearly an exact rip-off" and stated that for the band to obtain the rights to the image it was "simply a phone call and a check". Sugimoto refuted both of these claims, calling the use of the same photograph a coincidence and stating that no money was involved in the deal with U2.
- United Nations – United Nations (2008)
  - The original cover was a flipped version of the art for Abbey Road (1969) by the Beatles, with all four members on fire. It was subsequently not released in stores; Hot Topic destroyed 7,000 copies of the album's CDs due to them ordering it without knowing of the violations.
- Vampire Weekend – Contra (2010)
  - The cover art, taken in the 1980s, features a blonde girl staring into the camera with a slightly bemused expression on her face. In July 2010, the band and their label were sued by the model, Kirsten Kennis. Kennis claimed photographer Tod Scott Brody, who sold the image to the band, did not take the picture and she was not aware her image was being used until she saw the copy her teenage daughter had bought. Vampire Weekend also sued Brody, arguing that he was liable for any damages in the Kennis case due to misrepresentation on his part. Kennis and Vampire Weekend amicably settled their lawsuit in August 2011. However, the model and the band continued to pursue litigation against Brody. The case was ultimately dismissed in 2011.
- The Velvet Underground – The Velvet Underground & Nico (1967)
  - Shortly after its release, the band and their label Verve Records were threatened with a lawsuit by Warhol superstar Eric Emerson, whose image is projected upside-down on the back cover of the album. Copies of the album were withdrawn from sale so the image could be censored by a large sticker. The image was restored on the 1996 compact disc release of the album.

== Violence and gore ==
- The Amity Affliction - Chasing Ghosts (2012)
  - The album cover features a man hanging from a tree suggesting suicide, the album cover caused backlash due to the sensitive content. The band would defend the artwork however later apologised for making "vicious" statements from addressing the controversy.
- The Beatles – Yesterday and Today (1966)
  - In early 1966, photographer Robert Whitaker had the Beatles in the studio for a conceptual art piece titled A Somnambulant Adventure. For the shoot, Whitaker took a series of pictures of the group dressed in butchers' coats and draped with pieces of meat and body parts from plastic baby dolls. The group played along as they were tired of the usual photo shoots—Lennon recalled the band having "boredom and resentment at having to do another photo session and another Beatles thing"—and the concept was compatible with their own black humour. Although not originally intended as an album cover, the Beatles submitted photographs from the session for their promotional materials. Capitol Records president Alan W. Livingston recalled that his principal contact was with Paul McCartney, who pushed strongly for the photo to be used as the album cover and described it as "our comment on the [Vietnam] war". A photograph of the band smiling amid the mock carnage was used as promotional advertisements for the British release of the "Paperback Writer" single. In the United States, Capitol printed approximately 750,000 copies of Yesterday and Today with the same photograph on the front cover. Reaction was immediate, as many dealers refused to stock the LP. The record was immediately recalled, in what Capitol termed "Operation Retrieve"; all copies were ordered shipped back to the record label for a replacement cover image, leading to its rarity and popularity among collectors.
- The Beautiful South - Welcome to the Beautiful South (1989)
  - The original album cover depicted two pictures by Jan Saudek, one of a woman with a gun in her mouth, and another with a man smoking. Woolworths refused to stock the album, in the words of the band, to "prevent the hoards [sic] of impressionable young fans from blowing their heads off in a gun-gobbling frenzy, or taking up smoking"; An alternative cover featuring a picture of a stuffed toy rabbit and a teddy bear was therefore made. A second alternative cover was also prepared for the Canadian edition of the album; this version omitted the picture of the woman, and featured only the smoking man.
- Cannibal Corpse – Various albums (since 1991)
  - Numerous albums by the death metal band Cannibal Corpse are on the “list of media harmful to minors” in Germany and may only be offered and sold to adults. Some albums have even been confiscated by the courts and may no longer be sold to adults (although possession is still legal). In addition to the violence-glorifying lyrics, the brutal artwork was also often objected to.
    In an interview from 2004, George Fisher attempted to recall what originally provoked the ban: "A woman saw someone wearing one of our shirts, I think she is a schoolteacher, and she just caused this big stink about it. So [now] we can't play anything from the first three records. And it really sucks because kids come up and they want us to play all the old songs — and we would — but they know the deal. We can't play 'Born in a Casket' but can play 'Dismembered and Molested'."
    - Butchered at Birth (1991), on the index since October 1991, confiscated since 1994.
    - Eaten Back to Life (1990), on the index since August 1995.
    - Tomb of the Mutilated (1992), on the index since November 1995.
    - Hammer Smashed Face EP (1993), on the index since November 1995.
    - Vile (1996), on the index since September 2015, confiscated since July 2017.
    - Created to Kill (2000, a bootleg release consisting of demo recordings), on the index since August 2011, confiscated since November 2012.
    - Worm Infested EP (2003), on the index since January 2005.
    - Evisceration Plague (2009), on the index since April 2010.
    - Torture (2012), on the index since December 2012, confiscated since December 2013.
- CKY – Volume 1 (1999)
  - The cover originally depicted a stylized cartoon depiction of R. Budd Dwyer's live television suicide. After many complaints of offensiveness, the label forced the band to replace the offensive cover with a black and white cut-out of one of the band's live performances. The album was released with the band's original name Camp Kill Yourself, which was switched to CKY.
- Green Day – Kerplunk (1992)
  - The cover features a white picture (with some green added in) of a teenage girl wearing a flower shirt holding a smoking gun. The back cover features a boy lying on the ground with a gunshot wound on his back. Retail stores such as Walmart and Kmart initially refused to carry Kerplunk. The band saw continued controversy on their next album Dookie.
- Green Day – Dookie (1994)
  - The cover art shows a cartoon picture of dogs throwing bombs and dirt on people and buildings and a huge mushroom cloud explosion with the band's name on top of the cloud. A blimp on the left in the sky says "Bad Year" (a parody of the Goodyear Blimp) and on the right is a man with a harp in a cloud. Retailers Walmart and Kmart refused to sell the album because of this. Later printings of the album edited the back cover for copyright reasons, airbrushing out a puppet of Ernie from Sesame Street.
- Ice-T – Home Invasion (1993)
  - The album's cover depicts a white boy listening to rap music in the midst of a home invasion in which black individuals are attacking white individuals (presumably the boy's parents). Sire Records, owned by Time Warner, refused to release the album with the cover, and Ice-T left the label as a result.
- KMD – Black Bastards (created in 1993, not released until 2000)
  - The controversial cover art, which shows a Sambo figure hanging from a gallows, reportedly caused Elektra Records to shelve the album and drop the group (though they had been technically dissolved since 1993 due to the unexpected death of band member DJ Subroc).
- Lynyrd Skynyrd – Street Survivors (1977)
  - The original cover sleeve for Street Survivors had featured a photograph of the band, particularly Steve Gaines, standing in the street of a town engulfed in flames. Three days after the album was released, three of the band members were killed in a plane crash due to fuel exhaustion. Out of respect for the deceased (and at the request of Teresa Gaines, Steve Gaines' widow), MCA Records withdrew the original cover and replaced it with a similar image of the band against a simple black background. Thirty years later, for the deluxe CD version of Street Survivors, the original "flames" cover was restored.
- Manic Street Preachers – Journal for Plague Lovers (2009)
  - The album art depicts a painting by Jenny Saville. A number of UK supermarkets deemed the red/ochre colours on the portrait to be blood, and therefore used alternative packaging to stock the item. The alternative packaging in question is a longbox, a type of outer packaging used for some CDs in the 1980s and early to mid-1990s.
- Mayhem – The Dawn of the Black Hearts (1993)
  - A bootleg live album released by Warmaster Records which showed a real life photograph of the band's late vocalist Per Yngve Ohlin's corpse after he committed suicide by cutting his wrists and throat before shooting himself in the head with a shotgun. The photograph was taken by the band's guitarist Øystein Aarseth after returning home to find his body. He immediately went to a store for a camera and sent photographs of the body and pieces of Ohlin's skull to people in the Norwegian black metal scene he deemed "worthy". One of these people happened to be Mauricio Montoya Botero, the owner of Warmaster Records, who released a bootleg live album with one of the pictures as the album cover. It was subsequently reissued by various other labels over the years. The concert was later released officially by the band as "Live in Sarpsborg" (2017) without the controversial album cover.
- Metallica – Kill 'Em All (1983)
  - The album was originally set to be titled Metal Up Your Ass, with the cover featuring a toilet bowl with a hand clutching a dagger emerging from it. However, at the request of Megaforce Records (who thought the original album title would be inappropriate), the band changed the album title to Kill 'Em All. They also changed the artwork, this time depicting a shadow of a hand releasing a bloodied hammer.
- The Offspring – The Offspring (1989)
  - The album's original artwork depicted an image of a man's body exploding as the xenomorph from the Alien franchise holding a Stratocaster guitar emerges from his chest. The album was reportedly banned for being "too grotesque", and on the 1995 reissue, the artwork was replaced by a blurry black-and-white picture of a man.
- Pink Floyd – Wish You Were Here (1975)
  - The artwork depicts two men shaking hands in an alley at Warner Bros. Studios, with one on fire. As some retailers deemed it "too violent" and refused to sell the album, the LP sleeve was packaged in a black nylon outer bag adorned by a "four elements" sticker; this method of censorship was chosen as a deliberate nod to Roxy Music's Country Life, which was similarly given a nylon outer bag due to objections towards its cover art. Some later re-releases replace the original cover art entirely with a black background featuring the four-elements emblem, mimicking the appearance of the nylon bag.

== Other reasons ==
=== Tobacco ===
- Arctic Monkeys – Whatever People Say I Am, That's What I'm Not (2006)
  - The cover sleeve showing Chris McClure, a friend of the band, smoking a cigarette, was criticised by the head of the NHS in Scotland for "reinforcing the idea that smoking is OK". The image on the CD itself is a shot of an ashtray full of cigarettes. The band's product manager denied the accusation, and in fact suggested the opposite—"You can see from the image smoking is not doing him the world of good".

=== Decency, shocking content and cultural offense ===
- Acid Bath - When The Kite String Pops (1994)
  - The album cover features a self portrait painted by notorious serial killer and rapist John Wayne Gacy, portraying his clown persona "Pogo the Clown". This sparked controversy around the time.
- Armand Hammer and The Alchemist – Haram (2021)
  - The album cover is an image of two decapitated pigs on a butcher's table, their faces smeared in blood. Following the album's release, animal rights group PETA criticised the cover and implored the artists to change it.
- Black Grape - It's Great When You're Straight...Yeah (1995)
  - The album cover depicts a pop art illustration based on a Peruvian passport photograph of convicted terrorist Carlos the Jackal. The Anti-Defamation League accused the band of attempting to promote Carlos as a role model to young listeners. The cover's designers, Central Station Design, were unaware that Carlos was a terrorist, while the members of Black Grape stated that the reference was instead due to his affinity for disguises, befitting the band's origins as a covert project for ex-Happy Mondays frontman Shaun Ryder.
- Bush - Golden State (2001)
  - The album, which released in October 2001, initially had a blurry silhouette of an airplane flying over a mustard-colored background. In the wake of the September 11th attacks, the plane was removed and replaced with a tan-colored blank background with the band name and title in white lettering over it. Additionally, the lead track of the album, initially titled "Speed Kills", was renamed to "The People That We Love" to further reduce insensitive connotations.
- The Coup – Party Music (2001)
  - The original cover art, designed in June 2001, depicted Boots Riley and Pam the Funkstress destroying the Twin Towers of the World Trade Center. After the September 11 attacks, the group postponed the album's release until November of that year, with the record now sporting an alternate cover depicting a hand holding a flaming martini glass.
- Dream Theater - Live Scenes from New York (2001)
  - The original cover artwork for this release featured an image of the New York skyline, including the twin towers of the World Trade Centre, in flames. However, following the September 11 attacks, which occurred on the same day as the album's initial release, the album was immediately recalled before being reissued the following month with new artwork.
- Foreigner – Head Games (1979)
  - The album cover shows a teenage girl in a men's bathroom looking back at the viewer with an expression of surprise or fear on her face. It was criticized for being "tasteless" and for implying that the girl was in danger of being raped; the band and its record label denied that the latter interpretation was intended.
- The Game and Kanye West - "Eazy" (2022) (single)
  - The cover of this release features an image originally taken by British photographer Nick Knight in 1997 of a skinned monkey against a red background. Ingrid Newkirk, president of the animal rights organisation PETA, was heavily critical of the photo's use, commenting that "when you remove the fur, you can't miss that there's a person in there, that they are fellow primates, and do not belong to us to abuse for any purpose".
- Joni Mitchell - Don Juan's Reckless Daughter (1977):
  - The album cover features a photomontage of images of Mitchell taken by Norman Seeff against an orange-and-blue colour backdrop, the most prominent of which features her in blackface while wearing a pimp outfit and an afro wig. While Mitchell's use of blackface on the album cover and in subsequent projects has been defended by some in later years (including noted black musicians such as Charles Mingus and Chaka Khan), others have widely derided it as being racist. In April 2024, the album's cover was replaced on digital streaming services with a new image featuring Mitchell’s face inside the open mouth of a wolf, an outtake from the 1985 photo sessions for the later album Dog Eat Dog. Subsequent reissues of the album, both individually and as part of The Asylum Albums box set, have also utilised this new cover.

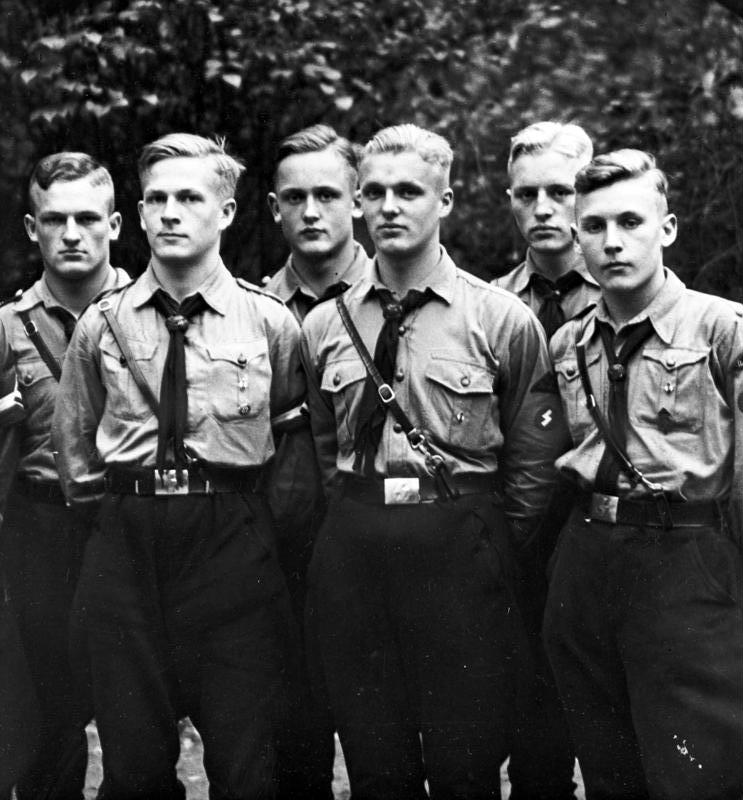
The album cover of An Ideal for Living was controversial for featuring a member of the Hitler Youth (a group of whom are pictured here) on its cover.

- Joy Division – An Ideal for Living (1978)
  - The cover has a black-and-white picture of a blond Hitler Youth member beating a drum, which was drawn by guitarist Bernard Sumner (called "Bernard Albrecht" on the poster sleeve) and the words "Joy! Division" printed in a blackletter font. The cover design, coupled with the nature of the band's name, fuelled controversy over whether the band had Nazi sympathies. When the EP was re-released on 12-inch vinyl, the original cover was replaced by artwork featuring scaffolding.
- The Mamas and the Papas – If You Can Believe Your Eyes and Ears (1966)
  - The album cover, which features the four members in a bathtub, also featured a toilet in the far right corner. The inclusion of this toilet was controversial for the time and copies with the cover were pulled due to complaints of indecency. The copies were re-issued with a text-box pasted on top of the toilet. Later issues of the album feature both the toilet and the bathtub cropped out entirely.
- Nirvana – In Utero (1993)
  - When In Utero was released, there were many objections to the song "Rape Me", despite the band's statements that the lyrics were "anti-rape". Retailers Wal-Mart and Kmart refused to sell the album because of the back cover artwork (featuring model fetuses), so a "clean" version was released for them which featured an altered version of the back cover and listed the title "Rape Me" as "Waif Me", though the song remained unchanged. The band acquiesced to the demands to change the artwork because members Kurt Cobain and Krist Novoselic were only able to buy music from the two chain stores as children; as a result they wanted to "make their music available to kids who don't have the opportunity to go to mom-and-pop stores".
- Public Enemy – "Hazy Shade of Criminal" (1992) (single)
  - The front cover depicted two Black men hanging from a tree above a crowd of smiling white onlookers, referencing the 1930 lynching of Thomas Shipp and Abram Smith in Indiana, while the back cover features another lynched black man and a photo of Chuck D posing as if crucified on the back fence of the White House.
- Pusha T – Daytona (2018)
  - The cover depicts a picture of deceased singer Whitney Houston's bathroom showing drugs that were used by her. The photo was bought by Kanye West for $85,000. Houston's family stated they found the artwork "disgusting and disrespectful".
- The Rolling Stones – Beggars Banquet (1968)
  - The original album cover featured a toilet wall which had been defaced by Mick Jagger and Keith Richards. This cover was rejected by the band's label (Decca Records), which prevented the album from being released for several months, until a new cover was designed.
- Silver Apples - Contact (1969)
  - For this release, the band had struck a deal with the airline Pan Am to shoot the front photo of the album's artwork in an airliner cockpit, in exchange for the Pan Am logo being visible in the photo. However, as a result of the album's back cover image, which depicted the band sitting amongst the wreckage from the aftermath of a plane crash, Pan Am instead filed a lawsuit against the band, resulting in all copies of Contact being pulled from shelves and Silver Apples themselves disbanding the following year.
- Van Halen – Balance (1995)
  - The cover in most markets features two nude conjoined twins sitting on a teeter-totter. The cover was altered in some markets, including Japan, to remove one of the twins entirely from the photograph.
- Various Artists – Beatlesongs (1982)
  - The original cover art features a cartoon of Beatles fans holding up a banner in praise of the band. The fan on the far left is a caricature of Mark David Chapman, who had shot and killed Beatles member John Lennon less than two years prior. Chapman's inclusion in the illustration drew public outcry, leading Rhino Records to reissue the album with a new cover depicting a photograph of Beatles memorabilia.

=== Quality issues ===
- Pop Smoke – Shoot for the Stars, Aim for the Moon (2020)
  - The album's original artwork, which American designer Virgil Abloh created, provoked significant criticism from fans, who called it "lazy" and "rushed", and said it was disrespectful. An online petition attracted tens of thousands of signatures. Abloh used a picture of Pop Smoke that was the first result of a Google Images search. A few hours later, the label announced it would replace Abloh's artwork in time for the album's release date. 50 Cent also criticized Abloh's artwork and posted over 35 fan-made designs, saying "they ain't going for this bullshit". After Abloh said he based his cover design on a conversation he had with Pop Smoke, American conceptual artist Ryder Ripps accused Abloh of stealing Ripps' "chrome rose" concept and "[ruining] it with a careless design", adding it was "so sad that someone would care this little about art, design and the memory of a human who was so loved to wrap his name up in lies and theft". Ripps created the album's final cover art, depicting a chrome rose against a black background. Hours before the album's commercial release, Pop Smoke's mother chose the final album cover.

=== Plagiarism ===
- YoungBoy Never Broke Again – Top (2020)
  - On August 20, 2020, an album cover was revealed on social media for YoungBoy's second studio album which depicts the rapper in a black-and-white photo standing in front of the camera behind a white background, wearing a black sweater and two necklaces. The cover generated negative reactions from viewers, due to similarities between it and the cover for rapper Roddy Ricch's debut studio album, Please Excuse Me for Being Antisocial (2019), with Ricch standing in front of the camera in the same attire, and in a similar pose. Roddy Ricch quickly stood in his defense, distancing himself from any comparisons, but did not take action against YoungBoy.
