= Electric Honey (record label) =

- Parent company: Glasgow Kelvin College
- Founded: 1992
- Founder: Stow College
- Distributor: Cargo
- Genre: Alternative
- Country of origin: United Kingdom
- Location: Glasgow, Scotland
- Official website: Electric Honey

Electric Honey was founded in 1992 and is Glasgow Kelvin College's in-house record label run by Ken McCluskey (The Bluebells), Douglas MacIntyre (Creeping Bent) and formerly Alan Rankine (The Associates) along with students from the HNC/D Music Business course. The label celebrated its 25th year in 2017 with many events including the release of the debut album "Any Joy" from Scottish six-piece indie rock band; "Pronto Mama."

The label was described by Uncut magazine as being "The most successful student-run label in the world", thanks to the history of artists having releases with the imprint, including Belle & Sebastian, Snow Patrol and Biffy Clyro. The 2012 album 'Self Help' by Young Aviators became the biggest selling CD album in the labels history.

Affiliate labels were also run under Electric Honey for a period of time. Gdansk, which released electronic-based artists and Root 8 which specialised in world music.

== Early years ==
The label was founded by staff at Stow College with the idea of creating a platform for students in the HNC/D Music Business course, to gain the experience of working firsthand with record company operations, while also having a hand in the creation of a thriving music scene within Scotland by releasing local artists. The first release was in 1993 with Baby Chaos, later known as Deckard, and their Buzz EP. Baby Chaos would then go on to receive considerable recognition from their releases with their 1996 album Love Your Self Abuse, being named one of Kerrang!'s 100 Greatest British Rock Albums Ever. The 1995 release of The Moondials, featured Stevie Jackson on guitar, who would go on to join Belle & Sebastian alongside Stuart Murdoch later that year.

== 1996/2000 ==
=== Belle and Sebastian ===
Electric Honey's first success came with the release of the label's first album release in 1996, Belle & Sebastian's Tigermilk, named after a track originally written for, but left out from, the album. Formed by Stuart Murdoch and Stuart David, later joined with Stevie Jackson, Belle & Sebastian formed in Glasgow in early 1996, recording their first demos in Stow College. Murdoch was involved early on with the University of Glasgow's Subcity Radio. Originally limited to 1000 copies on Electric Honey, the album was picked up by Jeepster Records who re-released it in 1999, and is now often cited as a classic influential album, with "The State I Am In" being placed at number 17 on Pitchfork's top 200 tracks of the 1990s. Belle and Sebastian recently played a special gig at Winfield House- the London residence of the US Ambassador to the United Kingdom.

=== Snow Patrol ===
Originally called Polarbear, Snow Patrol are the most successful of Electric Honey's signings having sold ten million albums worldwide. The band formed in Glasgow while front-man Gary Lightbody worked in the Glasgow venue Nice 'n' Sleazys. Starfighter Pilot came five years before their big selling album Final Straw, and featured Belle & Sebastian's Stuart Murdoch on piano and backing vocals.

Starfighter Pilot was later featured on the band's debut album Songs for Polarbears and re-released as a single through Jeepster Records.

=== Biffy Clyro ===
Biffy Clyro were signed to the label while they were students at Stow College. In 2000, they released their debut EP Thekidswhopoptodaywillrocktomorrow through Electric Honey, featuring the tracks "57" and "Justboy". Both tracks reappeared on the band's debut album release, Blackened Sky, through Beggars Banquet Records.

== Label Timeline ==
Artist/Band	Year	Release
Baby Chaos	1993	Buzz EP
Eight Miles High	1993	Go Single
The Moondials	1995	Can You See? Single
Belle and Sebastian	1996	Tigermilk Album
Polar Bear (Snow Patrol)	1997	Starfighter Pilot Single
Flow	1998	I Can Love You Single
Rob (Rayon) Alexandra	1999	Crystal Ball Single
Biffy Clyro	2000	Thekidswhopoptodaywillrocktomorrow EP
Pupkin	2001	Morning Light EP
Policechief	2002	Coup De Grace Single
Odeon Beatclub	2003	Behind My Eyes Single
Poor Old Ben	2004	Another Day EP
Clearfall	2005	Sculpt.Paint.Sketch Single
How to Swim	2006	The Little Orgasm EP
Various Artists	2007	Thank you for being you Album
Wake The President	2007	Sorrows for Clothes Single Mail, Alice Single; Remember Fun Single; I'm Sorry Single; Miss Tierney Single; You Can't Change That Boy Single; You Can't Change That Boy Album; Elaine Single
State Broadcasters	2008	The Ship and the Iceberg Album Let's Male T-shirts Single
Je Suis Animal	2008	Fortune Map Single
The Kingfishers	2008	Make Me Sad Single
Woodenbox with a Fistful of Fivers	2010	Home and the Wildhunt Album Besides The point Single; Twisted Mile Single
White Heath	2010	7.38 am Single Take No Thought for Tomorrow; GG Single; When the Watchmen Leave their Station Single
French Wives	2011	Numbers Single Dream of the Inbetween; Younger
Miniature Dinosaurs	2011	Fight or Flight Single
Young Aviators	2012	The Question Is? Single Self Help
Alex Hynes	2013	Slow Your Breath EP
Harry and the Hendersons	2013	Give Me Proof Single
Schnarff Schnarff	2014	Schnarff Schnarff EP
Apache Sun	2015	Apache Sun EP
Finn Le Marinel	2015	Love is Waves EP
Yacouba Sissoko	2015	Ti Mangala Ki Album
Be Charlotte	2016	Discover Single
Sunshine Social	2016	Reduce to Dust Album
The Claramassa	2016	Being Alive EP
Pronto Mama	2017	Arabesque Single Any Joy
Colonel Mustard & The Dijon 5	2018	Peace, Love & Mustard EP
Toni Woods	2018	Better Man Single
The Nickajack Men	2018	Changed Ways Single
Flew The Arrow	2019	Come The Wind, Come The Rain Single
Nicol & Elliott	2019	Wish You'd Stayed Away Single Sweet Downfall Single
Chris Greig & The Merchants	2019	Colours Single Lipstick EP
Toni Woods	2019	I Don't Wanna Be Your Friend Single

== Gdansk ==
=== Artists ===
- Found
- Ziggy Campbell
- Mylo
- Stafrann Hakon
- We Yo Nee
- Vin Landers
- Beatmooks
- ESC
- Monkey Tribe
- Mellow Sub Machine
- Tetsuo
- Kev Sim
- Fudge Fingas
- The Smash
- Dullshiny
- Reaz
- Disciples of Panic Earth
- Lyvonne
- K Trouble
- Cannon
- Scientific Support Dept.
- Spacewalker
- C.D Jefferson
- Cruiser
- S-Type
- Tycho
- Provinylistkarim
- Nordin Zaoui

=== Discography ===
==== Compilations ====
- Lato 001 (2003)
- Lato 002 (2004)
- Lato 003
- Lato 004
- Lato 005 (2006)

==== Albums ====
- Mellow Sub Machine – Los Machinos Mellos (2005)

== Root 8 ==
=== Artists ===
- Koshka
- Mungo's Hi-Fi
- Lee Patterson
- Red Road Global Music Collective
- Zuba
- Roddy Hart

=== Discography ===
- Welcome (2005)

== See also ==
- List of Record Labels
- List of independent UK record labels
- Scottish Music
