= Eradicate the Doubt =

2003 single by Biffy Clyro

Single by Biffy Clyro

from the album The Vertigo of Bliss
- B-side: "Convex, Concave"; "57"; "Now the Action Is On Fire!"; "The Ideal Height; "Justboy"
- Released: 22 September 2003
- Studio: Linford Manor (Milton Keynes, England)
- Genre: Alternative rock; post-grunge
- Length: 4:26
- Label: Beggars Banquet
- Songwriter: Simon Neil
- Producer: Chris Sheldon

Biffy Clyro singles chronology
"Questions and Answers" (2003)	"Eradicate the Doubt" (2003)	"There's No Such Thing as a Jaggy Snake" (2004)

The Vertigo of Bliss track listing
- 1. "Bodies in Flight"; 2. "The Ideal Height"; 3. "With Aplomb"; 4. "A Day Of..."; 5. "Liberate the Illiterate/A Mong Among Mingers"; 6. "Diary of Always"; 7. "Questions and Answers"; 8. "Eradicate the Doubt"; 9. "When the Faction's Fractioned"; 10. "Toys, Toys, Toys, Choke, Toys, Toys, Toys"; 11. "All the Way Down: Prologue Chapter 1"; 12. "A Man of His Appalling Posture"; 13. "Now the Action Is on Fire!"

"Eradicate the Doubt" is a song by the Scottish rock band Biffy Clyro and the third dedicated single from their 2003 album, The Vertigo of Bliss, and their eighth overall single. It reached number 98 on the UK Singles Chart.

== Track listings ==
Songs and lyrics by Simon Neil. Music by Biffy Clyro.

CD (BBQ374CD)

1. "Eradicate the Doubt" – 4:26
2. "Convex, Concave" (live at The Mean Fiddler, London, England, 14 June 2003) – 4:22
3. "57" (live at The Mean Fiddler, London, England, 14 June 2003) – 3:21
4. "Now the Action Is on Fire!" (live at The Mean Fiddler, London, England, 14 June 2003) – 6:23

DVD (BBQ374374DVD)

1. "Eradicate the Doubt" (video)
2. "Justboy" (video)
3. Photo Gallery

7" (BBQ374)

1. "Eradicate the Doubt" (live at The Mean Fiddler, London, England, 14 June 2003) – 4:26
2. "The Ideal Height" (live at The Mean Fiddler, London, England, 14 June 2003)
3. "Justboy" (live at The Mean Fiddler, London, England, 14 June 2003)

Download

1. "Eradicate the Doubt" (live at The Mean Fiddler, London, England, 14 June 2003) – 4:26
2. "The Ideal Height" (live at The Mean Fiddler, London, England, 14 June 2003) – 3:22

== Personnel ==
- Simon Neil – guitar, vocals
- James Johnston – bass, vocals
- Ben Johnston – drums, vocals
- Chris Sheldon – producer

== Charts ==
Chart (2003)	Peak position
Scotland Singles (OCC)	88
UK Singles (OCC)	98
UK Indie (OCC)	21
