= Jaggy =

Jaggy may refer to:

- Jaggies, in computer graphics, the stairlike lines that appear where there should be smooth straight lines or curves
- There's No Such Thing as a Jaggy Snake, a song by Biffy Clyro
- Jaggy Shivdasani (born 1958), Indian bridge player

== Football ==
- Jaggy MacBee, club mascot of Partick Thistle and Junior side Rossvale.
- Phil Jagielka (born 1982), English professional footballer
- Kim Jaggy (born 1982), Swiss-born Haitian footballer
