= Electric Honey =

Electric Honey may refer to:

- Electric Honey (record label), a record label run by students at Stow College in Scotland
- Electric Honey (album), by Luscious Jackson, 1999
- Electric Honey, a 1986 album by The Partland Brothers

== See also ==
- Pure Electric Honey, a 1990 album by Ant-Bee
