= Infinity Land =

Studio album by Biffy Clyro
- Released: 4 October 2004
- Recorded: Monnow Valley (Monmouth, Wales)
- Genre: Alternative rock; post-hardcore; math rock; post-grunge
- Length: 71:42
- Label: Beggars Banquet
- Producer: Chris Sheldon; Biffy Clyro

Biffy Clyro chronology
The Vertigo of Bliss (2003)	Infinity Land (2004)	Puzzle (2007)

Singles from Infinity Land
- 1. "There's No Such Thing as a Jaggy Snake" Released: 31 May 2004; 2. "Glitter and Trauma" Released: 9 August 2004; 3. "My Recovery Injection" Released: 20 September 2004; 4. "Only One Word Comes To Mind" Released: 14 February 2005

Professional ratings
Review scores
Source	Rating
Kerrang!	4/5 stars
BBC Music	Positive
The List	4/5 medals
musicOMH	Mixed
NME	8/10
XFM	Positive
Sputnikmusic	5/5

Infinity Land is the third studio album by Scottish rock band Biffy Clyro, released on 4 October 2004 on Beggars Banquet. Recorded at Monnow Valley, in Monmouth, Wales, the album was produced by Chris Sheldon and the band itself. The album was preceded by the singles, "There's No Such Thing as a Jaggy Snake", "Glitter and Trauma" and "My Recovery Injection".

== Overview ==
The album saw the band move into darker territory, in terms of both sound and lyrical content. It also furthered various experiments from The Vertigo of Bliss, such as using 5/4 time ("There is no Such Thing as a Jaggy Snake"), multiple time changes, key changes, instrumental variation, unpredictable riffs and complex song structures.

The album contains a hidden track, "Tradition Feed". After the final track, "Pause And Turn It Up", approximately 18 minutes of silence precedes a short poem, read by Simon Neil. "Tradition Feed" can also be found as a B-side to the vinyl 7" single "Only One Word Comes To Mind". As with each of the band's first three albums, it has been played in full three times, on 15 December 2005 at King Tut's Wah Wah Hut in Glasgow, then on 22 October 2024 in London and most recently on 26 October in the same year as part of a tour named "Celebration of Beginnings". "Only One Word Comes to Mind" reached #27 on the UK Singles Chart.

"Glitter And Trauma", "My Recovery Injection", and "Only One Word Comes To Mind" were released as singles in edited forms. "There's No Such Thing As A Jaggy Snake" was released as digital download. "Got Wrong" was considered for the final single but lost out to "Only One Word Comes To Mind".

The cover art was created by Chris Fleming, who also created the cover art for all the singles from Infinity Land.

Simon Neil has stated in various interviews that the title Infinity Land is a reference to serial killer Jeffrey Dahmer.

It was in a Jeffrey Dahmer book, he talks about his ideal place, which is called Infinity Land - his idea of heaven - which is really grim, being surrounded by corpses and shit. You don't know what it's about, it could sound hopeful, but when you know what it's referring to, it becomes quite sinister. In a way, it's kinda cool that people don't know what we're referring to, that people make up their own meanings for things... it could be quite optimistic, but it's not.

== Track listing ==
All tracks are written by Simon Neil, except where noted

No.	Title	Length
1.	"Glitter and Trauma"	5:10
2.	"Strung to Your Ribcage"	2:40
3.	"My Recovery Injection" (Neil, James Johnston)	4:14
4.	"Got Wrong"	2:58
5.	"The Atrocity"	3:10
6.	"Some Kind of Wizard"	3:51
7.	"Wave Upon Wave Upon Wave"	5:47
8.	"Only One Word Comes to Mind"	4:30
9.	"There's No Such Man as Crasp"	1:25
10.	"There's No Such Thing as a Jaggy Snake"	4:50
11.	"The Kids from Kibble and the Fist of Light"	3:54
12.	"The Weapons Are Concealed"	3:31
13.	"Pause It and Turn It Up"	25:31
14.	"Tradition Feed" (Hidden track starting at 24:27 of previous track)	1:04

Japanese edition
No.	Title	Length
15.	"Glitter and Trauma" (music video – bonus content)	4:06

B-sides
No.	Title	Length
1.	"Bonanzoid Deathgrip"	4:20
2.	"Stars and Shites"	3:23
3.	"Go Your Own Way" (Fleetwood Mac cover)	2:22
4.	"It's Always the Quiet Ones"	2:58
5.	"Corfu"	6:29
6.	"Drown in a Natural Light"	4:09
7.	"Gently"	3:53
8.	"Tradition Feed"	1:25
9.	"Diary of Always" (acoustic; original version featured on The Vertigo of Bliss)	3:14
10.	"Hero Management" (SBN 2002 Radio Session; digital download exclusive – original version featured on Blackened Sky)	4:48
11.	"There's No Such Thing as a Jaggy Snake" (Peel Session)

== Release history ==
Infinity Land was released in the UK in 2004.

Country	Date	Label	Format	Catalogue number
United Kingdom	4 October 2004	Beggars Banquet	CD	BBQCD238
United Kingdom	4 October 2004	Beggars Banquet	Vinyl	BBQ238
Japan	18 January 2005	King Records	CD	KICP-1045
