= Joy.Discovery.Invention =

2002 single by Biffy Clyro

Single by Biffy Clyro

from the album Blackened Sky
- A-side: "Toys, Toys, Toys, Choke, Toys, Toys, Toys"
- B-side: "The Houses of Roofs"; "All the Way Down (Chapter 2)"
- Released: 15 July 2002
- Studio: The Practice Pad (Glasgow, Scotland)
- Genre: Post-grunge
- Length: 3:38
- Label: Beggars Banquet
- Songwriter(s): Simon Neil
- Producer(s): Chris Sheldon

Biffy Clyro singles chronology
| "57" (2002) | "Joy.Discovery.Invention" / "Toys, Toys, Toys, Choke, Toys, Toys, Toys" (2002) | "The Ideal Height" (2003) |

Blackened Sky track listing
- 1. "Joy.Discovery.Invention"; 2. "27"; 3. "Justboy"; 4. "Kill the Old, Torture Their Young"; 5. "The Go-Slow"; 6. "Christopher's River"; 7. "Convex, Concave"; 8. "57"; 9. "Hero Management"; 10. "Solution Devices"; 11. "Stress on the Sky"; 12. "Scary Mary"

"Joy.Discovery.Invention" is a song by Biffy Clyro which opens their 2002 debut album, Blackened Sky. It was their fourth single, appearing as a double A-side with "Toys, Toys, Toys, Choke, Toys, Toys, Toys", a track from their second album, The Vertigo of Bliss. It reached number 86 on the UK Singles Chart and number 46 in the band's native Scotland.

== Overview ==
The title of the song is taken from a line from a Chuck Palahniuk novel called Choke:

And because there's no possibility of real disaster, real risk, we're left with no chance for real salvation. Real elation. Real excitement. Joy. Discovery. Invention.

It is one of relatively few Biffy Clyro songs where the guitars are in standard tuning, as they usually use Drop D tuning.

Track 3 on the vinyl release is a new version of a song that originally appeared on Iname.

== Track listings ==
Songs and lyrics by Simon Neil. Music by Biffy Clyro.

CD BBQ361CD

1. "Joy.Discovery.Invention" – 3:38
2. "Toys, Toys, Toys, Choke, Toys, Toys, Toys" – 5:18
3. "The Houses of Roofs" – 5:12

7" BBQ361

1. "Toys, Toys, Toys, Choke, Toys, Toys, Toys" (Edit) – 4:08
2. "Joy.Discovery.Invention" – 3:38
3. "All The Way Down: Chapter 2" – 3:49

== Personnel ==
- Simon Neil – guitar, vocals
- Ben Johnston – drums, vocals
- James Johnston – bass, vocals
- Chris Sheldon – producer

== Charts ==
| Chart (2002) | Peak position |
|---|---|
| Scotland (OCC) | 46 |
| UK Singles (OCC) | 86 |
| UK Indie (OCC) | 10 |
