= My Recovery Injection =

2004 single by Biffy Clyro

Single by Biffy Clyro

from the album Infinity Land
- B-side: "It's Always the Quiet Ones"; "Corfu"; "Diary of Always" (acoustic)
- Released: 20 September 2004
- Studio: Monnow Valley (Monmouth, Wales)
- Genre: Alternative rock
- Length: 4:13
- Label: Beggars Banquet
- Songwriters: Simon Neil, James Johnston
- Producer: Chris Sheldon

Biffy Clyro singles chronology
"Glitter and Trauma" (2004)	"My Recovery Injection" (2004)	"Only One Word Comes to Mind" (2005)

Infinity Land track listing
- 1. "Glitter and Trauma"; 2. "Strung To Your Ribcage"; 3. "My Recovery Injection"; 4. "Got Wrong"; 5. "The Atrocity"; 6. "Some Kind Of Wizard"; 7. "Wave Upon Wave Upon Wave"; 8. "Only One Word Comes To Mind"; 9. "There’s No Such Man As Crasp"; 10. "There's No Such Thing As A Jaggy Snake"; 11. "The Kids From Kibble And The Fist Of Light"; 12. "The Weapons Are Concealed"; 13. "Pause It And Turn It Up"

"My Recovery Injection" is a song by Biffy Clyro from their 2004 album Infinity Land and was the second physical single from the album. It was their eleventh single overall and reached number 24 on the UK Singles Chart.

== Track listings ==
All songs were written by Simon Neil.

CD (BBQ284CD)

1. "My Recovery Injection" (edit) – 3:14
2. "Its Always the Quiet Ones" – 2:58
3. "Corfu" – 6:29

DVD (BBQ284DVD)

1. "My Recovery Injection" (video) – 3:14
2. "The Making of..." (video)

7-inch (BBQ379)

1. "My Recovery Injection" – 4:13
2. "Diary of Always" (acoustic)

== Personnel ==
- Simon Neil – guitar, vocals
- James Johnston – bass, vocals
- Ben Johnston – drums, vocals
- Chris Sheldon – producer

== Charts ==
Chart (2004)	Peak position
Scotland Singles (OCC)	10
UK Singles (OCC)	24
UK Indie (OCC)	2
UK Rock & Metal (OCC)	3
