= Resurrected (album) =

Studio album by Witchfinder General
- Released: 2008
- Genres: Heavy metal, doom metal
- Length: 42:26
- Labels: Buried in Time, Dust

Witchfinder General chronology
Friends of Hell (1983)	Resurrected (2008)

Resurrected is the third and final full-length album by British doom metal band Witchfinder General. It was released on 30 August 2008 in the US on 2 September 2008 in the UK.

== Track listing ==
All tracks written by Phil Cope.

No.	Title	Length
1.	"The Living Hell"	7:50
2.	"The Gift of Life"	5:47
3.	"Final Justice"	4:20
4.	"Bryn-Y-Mor"	2:18
5.	"Brutal Existence"	5:15
6.	"Euthanasia"	5:25
7.	"A Night to Remember"	4:28
8.	"The Funeral / Beyond the Grave"	7:03
Total length:		42:26

== Personnel ==
- Phil Cope – guitars
- Dermot Redmond – drums
- Rod Hawkes – bass
- Gary Martin – vocals
