= Blackened Sky =

Studio album by Biffy Clyro
- Released: 10 March 2002
- Recorded: 2001–2002
- Studio: The Church (London), Moles (Bath), Mark Angelo (London), and Great Linford Manor (Great Linford)
- Genre: Emo
- Length: 49:00
- Label: Beggars Banquet
- Producer: Biffy Clyro; Chris Sheldon; Paul Corkett; DP Johnson; S.A.G.

Biffy Clyro chronology
Thekidswhopoptodaywillrocktomorrow (2000)	Blackened Sky (2002)	The Vertigo of Bliss (2003)

Singles from Blackened Sky
- 1. "27" Released: 9 April 2001; 2. "Justboy" Released: 1 October 2001; 3. "57" Released: 4 February 2002; 4. "Joy.Discovery.Invention"/"Toys, Toys, Toys, Choke, Toys, Toys, Toys" Released: 7 October 2002

Blackened Sky is the debut studio album by Scottish rock band Biffy Clyro. Largely produced with the band by Chris Sheldon, it was released by Beggars Banquet Records on 10 March 2002. The album reached number 78 on the UK Albums Chart, and spawned four singles. A deluxe remastered edition was released in 2012, which featured, in addition to the original 12 album tracks, two songs from the band's debut extended play (EP) thekidswhopoptodaywillrocktomorrow and a number of B-sides from the album's singles.

== Reception ==
Professional ratings
Review scores
Source	Rating
AllMusic	1.5/5 stars

Critical reception to Biffy Clyro's debut album was generally mixed. John Murphy of independent music website musicOMH, writing at the time of its release in 2002, claimed that Blackened Sky was evidence of Biffy's status as "the most exciting new band in Britain", drawing comparisons to influencing band Nirvana and praising elements such as the consistency in the vocal performances. His review was not entirely positive though, as he pointed out that "with this album ... the band sometimes lose the balance between light and shade", claiming that "There's no sign of any kind of breakthrough song here, ... but if you take the time to explore this Blackened Sky you'll find a few shining stars worth exploring". Jason MacNeil of PopMatters was similarly indecisive, concluding that Blackened Sky was "Generally a credible first step despite some lapses in judgement".

Allmusic critic Dean Carlson was less generous, awarding the album a low rating of 1.5 out of five stars; the review proposed that on the album "the band came across as all of the least interesting aspects of American grunge released a decade too late", with the website claiming that Biffy did not live up to the hype they had received prior to the album's release.

== Track listing ==
All lyrics are written by Simon Neil; all music is composed by Simon Neil.

No.	Title	Length
1.	"Joy.Discovery.Invention"	3:38
2.	"27"	3:27
3.	"Justboy"	4:22
4.	"Kill the Old, Torture Their Young"	6:12
5.	"The Go-Slow"	3:59
6.	"Christopher's River"	4:09
7.	"Convex, Concave"	4:28
8.	"57"	3:21
9.	"Hero Management"	4:46
10.	"Solution Devices"	3:18
11.	"Stress on the Sky"	4:14
12.	"Scary Mary" (lyrics co-written by Martin Scott)	3:06
Total length:		49:00

2012 remastered edition bonus tracks
No.	Title	Length
13.	"Hope for an Angel"	4:06
14.	"Less the Product"	6:05
15.	"Instructio4"	5:53
16.	"Breatheher"	3:55
17.	"Unsubtle"	2:27
18.	"Being Gabriel"	6:20
19.	"Time as an Imploding Unit/Waiting for Green"	9:25
20.	"All the Way Down Chapter 2"	3:49
21.	"The Houses of Roofs"	5:13
Total length:		96:13

== Personnel ==
Biffy Clyro

- Simon Neil – vocals, guitars, production
- James Johnston – bass, vocals, production
- Ben Johnston – drums, vocals, production

Additional musicians

- Lyndsey Joss – additional instrument (track 15)
- Martin Scott – drums (track 15)

Additional personnel

- Chris Blair – mastering
- Phil Lee – design
- Tom Collier – cover photography
- Paul McCallum – band photography

Production personnel

- Chris Sheldon – production, recording and engineering (tracks 1, 3, 4, 6 and 9–12), mixing
- Paul Corkett – production, recording and engineering (tracks 5, 7 and 8)
- DP Johnson – production, recording and engineering (tracks 2 and 15–20)
- S.A.G. – production, recording and engineering (tracks 2 and 15–20)
- Mike Walker – production, recording and engineering (track 13)
- Jamie Hart – production assistance (track 13)
- Dan Swift – engineering (track 21)
- Dan Austin – engineering assistance
- Graham Dominy – engineering assistance
- Kevin Gallagher – engineering assistance
- Sam Miller – engineering assistance

== Certifications ==
Region	Certification	Certified units/sales
United Kingdom (BPI)	Gold	100,000^{‡}
^{‡} Sales+streaming figures based on certification alone.

== Release history ==
Region	Date	Label	Format	Catalog	Ref.
United Kingdom	10 March 2002	Beggars Banquet Records	CD album	BBQCD226	
United Kingdom	10 March 2002	Beggars Banquet Records	LP record	BBQLP226	
France	8 April 2002	Labels	CD album	7243 8 1207420	
Scandinavia	8 April 2002	Playground Music Scandinavia	CD album	BBQCD226	
United Kingdom	2 April 2012	Beggars Banquet Records	Double LP	BBQLP2089	
