= Only One Word Comes to Mind =

2005 single by Biffy Clyro

Single by Biffy Clyro

from the album Infinity Land
- B-side: "Drown in a Natural Light"; "Gently"; "Tradition Feed"
- Released: 14 February 2005
- Recorded: Monnow Valley (Monmouth, Wales)
- Length: 4:39 (album version); 3:11 (radio version)
- Label: Beggars Banquet
- Songwriter: Simon Neil
- Producer: Chris Sheldon

Biffy Clyro singles chronology
"My Recovery Injection" (2004)	"Only One Word Comes to Mind" (2005)	"Semi-Mental" (2006)

Infinity Land track listing
- 1. "Glitter and Trauma"; 2. "Strung to Your Ribcage"; 3. "My Recovery Injection"; 4. "Got Wrong"; 5. "The Atrocity"; 6. "Some Kind of Wizard"; 7. "Wave Upon Wave Upon Wave"; 8. "Only One Word Comes to Mind"; 9. "There's No Such Man as Crasp"; 10. "There's No Such Thing as a Jaggy Snake"; 11. "The Kids from Kibble and the Fist of Light"; 12. "The Weapons Are Concealed"; 13. "Pause It and Turn It Up"

"Only One Word Comes To Mind" is a song by Biffy Clyro from their 2004 album, Infinity Land. It is the third single from the album and their tenth single overall. It reached number 27 on the UK Singles Chart and number seven on the Scottish Singles Chart.

== Track listings ==
Songs and lyrics by Simon Neil. Music by Biffy Clyro.

CD (BBQ384CD)

1. "Only One Word Comes to Mind" (radio edit) – 3:11
2. "Drown in a Natural Light" – 4:09
3. "Gently" – 3:53

DVD (BBQ384DVD)

1. "Only One Word Comes to Mind" (video)
2. "The Making Of..." (photo gallery)

7" (BBQ384)

1. "Only One Word Comes to Mind" (radio edit) – 3:11
2. "Tradition Feed" – 1:04

== Personnel ==
- Simon Neil – guitar, vocals
- James Johnston – bass, vocals
- Ben Johnston – drums, vocals
- Chris Sheldon – producer

== Charts ==
Chart (2005)	Peak position
Scotland Singles (OCC)	7
UK Singles (OCC)	27
UK Indie (OCC)	2
