= 27 (song) =

Single by Biffy Clyro

from the album Blackened Sky
- B-side: "Instructio4"; "Breatheher"
- Released: 9 April 2001
- Studio: The Practice Pad (Glasgow, Scotland)
- Genre: Post-grunge
- Length: 3:27
- Label: Beggars Banquet
- Songwriter: Simon Neil
- Producer: Chris Sheldon

Biffy Clyro singles chronology
"iname" (1999)	"27" (2001)	"Justboy" (2001)

Blackened Sky track listing
- 1. "Joy.Discovery.Invention"; 2. "27"; 3. "Justboy"; 4. "Kill the Old, Torture Their Young"; 5. "The Go-Slow"; 6. "Christopher's River"; 7. "Convex, Concave"; 8. "57"; 9. "Hero Management"; 10. "Solution Devices"; 11. "Stress on the Sky"; 12. "Scary Mary"

"27" is a song by Scottish band Biffy Clyro from their 2002 debut album, Blackened Sky. It was the band's first single on Beggars Banquet, released on 9 April 2001 in the United Kingdom. Although the song did not reach the top 100 on the UK Singles Chart, it managed to peak at number 43 on the UK Indie Chart.

== Overview ==
"27" was voted Single of the Week by US band Taproot in the 7 April 2001 issue of Kerrang! magazine. Bassist James Johnston has commented about this, saying:

I was getting ready to wash my car when Ben brought the magazine into the house. We couldn't believe it and started running around the house screaming. When I calmed down, I thought, "Well... better clean the car, then." We're from Kilmarnock and no-one gives a shit. It helps keep your feet on the ground.

== Track listings ==
Songs and lyrics by Simon Neil. Music by Biffy Clyro.

- CD BBQCD352, 7" BBQ352
1. "27" – 3:27
2. "Instructio4" – 5:53
3. "Breatheher" – 3:54

== Personnel ==
- Simon Neil – guitar, vocals
- James Johnston – bass, vocals
- Ben Johnston – drums, vocals
- Chris Sheldon – producer

== Charts ==
Chart (2001)	Peak position
UK Indie (OCC)	43
