= Toys, Toys, Toys, Choke, Toys, Toys, Toys =

2002 single by Biffy Clyro

Single by Biffy Clyro

from the album The Vertigo of Bliss
- A-side: "Joy.Discovery.Invention"
- B-side: "The Houses of Roofs"; "All the Way Down (Chapter 2)"
- Released: 15 July 2002
- Recorded: The Practice Pad (Glasgow, Scotland)
- Genre: Post-grunge; hard rock
- Length: 5:28
- Label: Beggars Banquet
- Songwriter: Simon Neil
- Producer: Chris Sheldon

Biffy Clyro singles chronology
"57" (2002)	"Joy.Discovery.Invention" / "Toys, Toys, Toys, Choke, Toys, Toys, Toys" (2002)	"The Ideal Height" (2003)

The Vertigo of Bliss track listing
- 1. "Bodies in Flight"; 2. "The Ideal Height"; 3. "With Aplomb"; 4. "A Day Of..."; 5. "Liberate the Illiterate/A Mong Among Mingers"; 6. "Diary of Always"; 7. "Questions and Answers"; 8. "Eradicate the Doubt"; 9. "When the Faction's Fractioned"; 10. "Toys, Toys, Toys, Choke, Toys, Toys, Toys"; 11. "All the Way Down: Prologue Chapter 1"; 12. "A Man of His Appalling Posture"; 13. "Now the Action Is on Fire!"

"Toys, Toys, Toys, Choke, Toys, Toys, Toys" is a song by Biffy Clyro from their second album, The Vertigo of Bliss, and was the band's fourth single. It appeared as a double A-side with "Joy.Discovery.Invention", and was released on CD and 7". The B-side to the vinyl, "All The Way Down (Chapter 2)", originally first appeared on the band's debut independent single, "Iname", in 1999.

== Overview ==
Simon Neil has commented on the song, saying:

This was the first song that was written for The Vertigo of Bliss. We've got lots of back-and-forth vocals and has got a crazy break-down section. It's almost quintessential Biffy, I guess.

Track 3 on the vinyl release is a new version of a song that originally appeared on Iname.

== Track listings ==
Songs and lyrics by Simon Neil. Music by Biffy Clyro.

- CD BBQ361CD
1. "Joy.Discovery.Invention" – 3:38
2. "Toys, Toys, Toys, Choke, Toys, Toys, Toys" – 5:28
3. "The Houses of Roofs" – 5:12
- 7" BBQ361
1. "Toys, Toys, Toys, Choke, Toys, Toys, Toys" (edit) – 4:08
2. "Joy.Discovery.Invention" – 3:38
3. "All the Way Down: Chapter 2" – 3:49

== Personnel ==
- Simon Neil – guitar, vocals
- James Johnston – bass, vocals
- Ben Johnston – drums, vocals
- Chris Sheldon – producer
- Paul McCallum - video director
