= Soviet Invasion! =

EP by Witchfinder General
- Released: 1982
- Genres: Heavy metal, doom metal
- Length: 13:01
- Label: Heavy Metal Records

Witchfinder General chronology
Burning a Sinner (1981)	Soviet Invasion! (1982)	Death Penalty (1982)

Soviet Invasion! is the second release from British doom metal band Witchfinder General. It was released in 1982 on Heavy Metal Records. The EP was released on 12" vinyl. In 2004, it was reissued on 12" vinyl with "Soviet Invasion!" and "Rabies" on the A-side and the "Burning a Sinner" single on the b-side ("Burning a Sinner" and "Satan's Children"). In 2007, it was released on CD for the first time on the compilation Buried Amongst the Ruins. The song was written by the Phillip Cope & Zeeb Parkes Partnership before the Berlin Wall came down and the end of the Cold War. The so-called 'live' track on the single, "Rabies," was not actually a live recording at all; it was in fact a studio production with crowd effects over-dubbed. The fake live recording was done at the request of Paul Birch Head of Heavy Metal Records.

== Track listing ==
1. "Soviet Invasion!"
2. "Rabies"
3. "R.I.P (Live)"

== Credits ==
- Zeeb Parkes – vocals
- Phil Cope – guitar
- Toss McCready – bass
- Steve Kinsell – drums (as Kid Rimple)
