= Glitter and Trauma =

2004 single by Biffy Clyro

Single by Biffy Clyro

from the album Infinity Land
- B-side: "Bonanzoid Deathgrip"; "Stars and Shites"; "There's No Such Thing as a Jaggy Snake"
- Released: 9 August 2004
- Studio: Monnow Valley (Monmouth, Wales)
- Genre: Alternative rock
- Length: 5:10 (album version); 4:06 (radio version)
- Label: Beggars Banquet
- Songwriter: Simon Neil
- Producer: Chris Sheldon

Biffy Clyro singles chronology
"There's No Such Thing as a Jaggy Snake" (2004)	"Glitter and Trauma" (2004)	"My Recovery Injection" (2004)

Infinity Land track listing
- 1. "Glitter and Trauma"; 2. "Strung to Your Ribcage"; 3. "My Recovery Injection"; 4. "Got Wrong"; 5. "The Atrocity"; 6. "Some Kind of Wizard"; 7. "Wave Upon Wave Upon Wave"; 8. "Only One Word Comes to Mind"; 9. "There's No Such Man as Crasp"; 10. "There's No Such Thing as a Jaggy Snake"; 11. "The Kids from Kibble and the Fist of Light"; 12. "The Weapons Are Concealed"; 13. "Pause It and Turn It Up"

"Glitter and Trauma" is a song by Biffy Clyro, which opens their 2004 album, Infinity Land. It was the first physical single from the album, and their eighth single overall. It reached number 21 on the UK Singles Chart and became their second top-ten hit in their native Scotland.

== Background ==
The song is the band's first to use synthesisers, which would be featured more prominently in their later albums, as featured in the electronic-heavy intro alongside a drum machine before the track bursts into a heavy riff in drop D tuning. According to frontman Simon Neil, the reason for this unconventional opening was to lead listeners into thinking they had bought the wrong album.

== Track listing ==
Music and lyrics by Simon Neil. CD (BBQ377CD)

1. "Glitter and Trauma" (radio edit) – 4:06
2. "Bonanzoid Deathgrip" – 4:20
3. "Stars and Shites" – 3:23

DVD (BBQ377DVD)

1. "Glitter and Trauma" (video)
2. "Go Your Own Way" (Fleetwood Mac cover) – 2:22
3. Untitled Movie (video)

7" (BBQ377)

1. "Glitter and Trauma" (radio edit) – 4:06
2. "There's No Such Thing as a Jaggy Snake" (Peel Session) – 4:43

== Personnel ==
- Simon Neil – guitar, vocals
- Ben Johnston – drums, vocals
- James Johnston – bass, vocals
- Chris Sheldon – producer

== Charts ==
Chart (2004)	Peak position
Scotland Singles (OCC)	7
UK Singles (OCC)	21
UK Indie (OCC)	2
