= Joanne Latham =

British model

- Born: Joanne Kandy Latham; 21 March 1961 (age 65); Wolverhampton, West Midlands, England
- Education: Royal Ballet School
- Occupation: Glamour model
- Height: 5 ft 5 in (1.65 m)

Joanne Kandy Latham (born 21 March 1961) is an English former glamour model.

== Biography ==
Latham was born in Wolverhampton. After studying classical ballet for nine years she took a scholarship to the Royal Ballet School. A dancing competition led to her modelling for retailer Miss Selfridge. This led on to other modelling and television commercials, including appearing on Page 3 of The Sun and in the Daily Mirror.

In 1978, ATV made a documentary about her called "A Model's Dream" in the series England, Their England. After a shoot with leading glamour photographer Patrick Lichfield, he included her photo on the inside front cover of his book The Most Beautiful Women, a collection of his photographs.

In 1979, men's magazines Playboy and Penthouse competed to publish the first nude pictures of her. Latham signed a contract with Bob Guccione and Penthouse, which promised a fee of £70,000 for her to appear in the September 1979 issue, which was also the 10th Anniversary of the US edition. Latham was selected as Pet Of The Month and featured on nineteen pages of the magazine, including the cover. That edition made U.S. history, selling more in dollar percentage than any other magazine to date and making a profit of $18 million. She also appeared with other Penthouse Pets in the televised broadcast pageant for the selection of the 1979 Pet Of The Year, in which she participated in the opening segment with singer Frankie Valli and a fashion show. After a brief affair with Guccione, Latham's contract was terminated with Penthouse when she fell in love with Guccione's son. She moved from New York to Los Angeles and briefly became the girlfriend of Hugh Hefner, living in the Playboy Mansion. In the early 1980s, Latham returned to England to her Midland home in the village of Tettenhall.

Latham was featured on the cover of Death Penalty, the debut album by the heavy metal band Witchfinder General, which was released in 1982. She also featured on the cover of Friends of Hell, their second album released in 1983.

In 1982, Latham was involved in a serious car accident, after which she gave up modelling and opened the first 'workout' keep-fit studio in the UK. Her daughter, Elizablue Nairi, was born in southern Spain in June 1984 and follows in her mother’s footsteps steps on her popular Instagram page where she uploads nude images.

In later years, she studied drama at Birmingham Repertory Theatre, working under a director of the Royal Shakespeare Company and went on to play the lead role in a government-funded film for the arts.

In 1999, Latham became a teacher of yoga training at the Sivananda Yoga Vendanta Centre in Nassau, Bahamas. Since then, she has continued working in the healing arts. Despite several offers, she has refused to write her autobiography. She has set up her own charity with her daughter Eliza.
