= Questions and Answers (Biffy Clyro song) =

- CD1 single

Single by Biffy Clyro

from the album The Vertigo of Bliss
- B-side: "Good Practice Makes Permanent"; "Let's Get Smiling"; "Muckqwaikerjawbreaker"; "I Hope You're Done"; "Ewen's True Mental You"
- Released: 26 May 2003
- Recorded: Linford Manor, Milton Keynes, England
- Genre: Alternative rock; post-grunge; art rock
- Length: 4:04
- Label: Beggars Banquet
- Songwriter: Simon Neil
- Producer: Chris Sheldon

Biffy Clyro singles chronology
| "The Ideal Height" (2003) | "Questions and Answers" (2003) | "Eradicate the Doubt" (2003) |

The Vertigo of Bliss track listing
- 13 tracks: 1. "Bodies in Flight"; 2. "The Ideal Height"; 3. "With Aplomb"; 4. "A Day Of..."; 5. "Liberate The Illiterate/A Mong Among Mingers"; 6. "Diary of Always"; 7. "Questions and Answers"; 8. "Eradicate the Doubt"; 9. "When The Faction’s Fractioned"; 10. "Toys, Toys, Toys, Choke, Toys, Toys, Toys"; 11. "All The Way Down: Prologue Chapter 1"; 12. "A Man of His Appalling Posture"; 13. "Now The Action Is on Fire!"

"Questions and Answers" is a song by the Scottish rock band Biffy Clyro, and was the second single to be released from their 2003 album, The Vertigo of Bliss; It was their first single to enter the top 40 of the UK Singles Chart, reaching a peak of number 26. It was also their first top-ten single in their home country, reaching number nine on the Scottish Singles Chart.

== Composition ==
The song is very different in style from the rest of the album, featuring elements of pop punk, post-grunge and art rock. In the chorus, frontman and guitarist Simon Neil trades vocals with drummer Ben Johnston.

== Music video ==
The music video was directed by Bradley Beesley and Dan Brown. It was recorded with Simon Neil in a wheelchair after he broke his foot the night before the video shoot at a gig by jumping off the PA system. Brown said of the making of the video: "Brad and I flew to London in March of 2003 to shoot a video for Biffy Clyro (then signed to Beggars Banquet). We had very little money so we shot the video on DV, transferred the video to 35mm film and had a friend scratch animation on the film's negative. He also painted frames with Sharpies to give it a retro/psychedelic feel. I brought my small Sony handycam and shot home movies during the shoot. This was the first of three videos we made for Simon, James and Ben. Who were, without a doubt, the absolute best to work with."

== Track listings ==
Songs and lyrics by Simon Neil. Music by Biffy Clyro.

CD 1 (BBQ368CD)

1. "Questions and Answers" (single edit) – 3:46
2. "Good Practice Makes Permanent" – 4:19
3. "Let's Get Smiling" – 3:04

CD 2 (BBQ368CD2)

1. "Questions and Answers" (single edit) – 3:46
2. "Muckquaikerjawbreaker" – 4:10
3. "I Hope You're Done" – 3:40

7" (BBQ368)

1. "Questions and Answers" (single edit) – 3:46
2. "Muckquaikerjawbreaker" – 4:10
3. "Ewen's True Mental You" – 1:24

== Personnel ==
- Simon Neil – guitar, vocals
- James Johnston – bass
- Ben Johnston – drums, vocals
- Chris Sheldon – producer

== Charts ==
| Chart (2003) | Peak position |
|---|---|
| Scotland Singles (OCC) | 9 |
| UK Singles (OCC) | 26 |
| UK Indie (OCC) | 4 |
