= The Ideal Height =

Single by Biffy Clyro

from the album The Vertigo of Bliss
- B-side: "...And with the Scissorkick Is Victorious"
- Released: 24 March 2003
- Recorded: Linford Manor, Milton Keynes, England
- Genre: Alternative rock
- Length: 3:41
- Label: Beggars Banquet
- Songwriter: Simon Neil
- Producer: Chris Sheldon

Biffy Clyro singles chronology
| "Joy.Discovery.Invention / Toys, Toys, Toys, Choke, Toys, Toys, Toys" (2002) | "The Ideal Height" (2003) | "Questions and Answers" (2003) |

The Vertigo of Bliss track listing
- 13 tracks: 1. "Bodies in Flight"; 2. "The Ideal Height"; 3. "With Aplomb"; 4. "A Day Of..."; 5. "Liberate the Illiterate/A Mong Among Mingers"; 6. "Diary of Always"; 7. "Questions and Answers"; 8. "Eradicate the Doubt"; 9. "When the Faction's Fractioned"; 10. "Toys, Toys, Toys, Choke, Toys, Toys, Toys"; 11. "All the Way Down: Prologue Chapter 1"; 12. "A Man of His Appalling Posture"; 13. "Now the Action Is on Fire!"

"The Ideal Height" is a song by the Scottish rock band Biffy Clyro, released as the first solo A-side single from their second studio album, The Vertigo of Bliss (2003), on 24 March 2003. On the UK Singles Chart, it peaked at number 46.

== Track listings ==
Songs and lyrics by Simon Neil. Music by Biffy Clyro.

CD (BBQ365CD)

1. "The Ideal Height" – 3:41
2. "...And with the Scissorkick Is Victorious" – 5:24
3. "Do You Remember What You Came For?" – 3:31

7" (BBQ365)

1. "The Ideal Height" – 3:41
2. "...And with the Scissorkick Is Victorious" – 5:24

== Personnel ==
- Simon Neil – guitar, vocals
- James Johnston – bass, vocals
- Ben Johnston – drums, vocals
- Chris Sheldon – producer

== Charts ==
| Chart (2003) | Peak position |
|---|---|
| Scotland Singles (OCC) | 31 |
| UK Singles (OCC) | 46 |
| UK Indie (OCC) | 4 |
