= The Vertigo of Bliss =

Studio album by Biffy Clyro
- Released: 16 June 2003
- Recorded: 2002–2003
- Studio: Great Linford Manor (Milton Keynes), Eden (London), The Church (London) and Sanctuary Westside (London)
- Genre: Post-hardcore; alternative rock; art rock; math rock; post-grunge
- Length: 62:04
- Label: Beggars Banquet
- Producer: Biffy Clyro, Chris Sheldon

Biffy Clyro chronology
Blackened Sky (2002)	The Vertigo of Bliss (2003)	Infinity Land (2004)

Singles from The Vertigo of Bliss
- 1. "Joy.Discovery.Invention"/"Toys, Toys, Toys, Choke, Toys, Toys, Toys" Released: 15 July 2002; 2. "The Ideal Height" Released: 24 March 2003; 3. "Questions and Answers" Released: 26 May 2003; 4. "Eradicate the Doubt" Released: 22 September 2003

The Vertigo of Bliss is the second studio album by the Scottish rock band Biffy Clyro. Produced with the band by Chris Sheldon, it was released by Beggars Banquet Records on 16 June 2003. The album reached number 48 on the UK Albums Chart, and spawned four singles. A deluxe remastered edition was released in 2012, which featured, in addition to the original 13 album tracks, a number of B-sides from the album's singles.

== Cover artwork ==
The album cover for The Vertigo of Bliss was designed by comic book artist Milo Manara. Despite raising some controversy, the artwork was praised by music magazine ShortList who named it in their list of "The 50 Coolest Album Covers Ever", explaining that the "erotic and controversial" cover "only endeared [Biffy] more to the small but loyal fanbase they were beginning to cultivate". In an interview with ShortList, Neil said of the cover "we got quite a bad reaction to that artwork when it first came out [...] that was our first kind of lesson learned that perhaps not everyone shares your perspective on life, or what you value as art, because we were naive enough to be taken by surprise, and then I was naive enough that when people started saying, "Oh this is fucking schoolboy shit," I got really annoyed because I was like, "It's so not that – you're actually being schoolboy here by judging it on just a shallow level."

== Reception ==
Professional ratings
Review scores
Source	Rating
Drowned in Sound	8/10
The Guardian	4/5 stars
The List	4/5 medals

Critical reception to Biffy Clyro's second album was generally positive. Sean Adams of Drowned in Sound wrote "'The Vertigo of Bliss' is everything you want it to be and more. Promise. Spread the love, instil it into the hearts of all you know, give it time, and enjoy." Writing for newspaper The Guardian, Betty Clarke awarded the album four out of five stars, calling it "inventive and sublime". Praising singles "Questions and Answers" and "Eradicate the Doubt" in particular, Clarke praised the band for "juggling anger with adoration as they take indie sensitivity and embolden it with blistering rock fury", and said that the album "crackles with certainty". Mark Robertson of The List wrote, "Taking a teen obsession for G N'R and grunge and bonding it to a sense of incurable romanticism, they create something both tender and terror-filled."

Ex-Oceansize/Biffy Clyro touring guitarist Mike Vennart named the album as one of his favourites in 2016, saying "This is pretty much the perfect album. It’s long and sprawling. It’s got all those fanciful, silly ticks and twitches which make Biffy so strange. This record gave me a new love for spidery, wiry clean guitar."

== Track listing ==
All lyrics are written by Simon Neil; all music is composed by Simon Neil.

No.	Title	Length
1.	"Bodies in Flight"	5:17
2.	"The Ideal Height"	3:41
3.	"With Aplomb"	5:29
4.	"A Day Of..."	2:24
5.	"Liberate the Illiterate / A Mong Among Mingers"	5:28
6.	"Diary of Always"	4:04
7.	"Questions and Answers"	4:02
8.	"Eradicate the Doubt"	4:26
9.	"When the Faction's Fractioned"	3:36
10.	"Toys, Toys, Toys, Choke, Toys, Toys, Toys"	5:28
11.	"All the Way Down: Prologue / Chapter 1"	6:43
12.	"A Man of His Appalling Posture"	3:25
13.	"Now the Action Is on Fire!" (ends at 5:55. The hidden track "Ewen's True Mental You" begins at minute 6:25.)	8:01
Total length:		62:04

2012 remastered edition bonus tracks
No.	Title	Length
14.	"Ewen's True Mental You"	1:37
15.	"...And with the Scissorkick Is Victorious"	5:24
16.	"Do You Remember What You Came For?"	3:31
17.	"Good Practice Makes Permanent"	4:19
18.	"Let's Get Smiling"	3:04
19.	"Muckqwaikerjawbreaker"	4:10
20.	"I Hope You're Done"	3:40
Total length:		87:49

== Personnel ==
Biffy Clyro

- Simon Neil – vocals, guitars, production
- James Johnston – bass, vocals, production
- Ben Johnston – drums, vocals, production

Additional musicians

- Kimberlee McCarrick – violin (tracks 1, 3 and 14)
- Martin McCarrick – cello (tracks 1, 3 and 14)

Production personnel

- Chris Sheldon – production, recording and engineering (all tracks except 17–20), mixing
- Phil English – engineering
- Sam Miller – engineering
- DP Johnson – production (tracks 17–20)
- S.A.G. – production (tracks 17–20)

Additional personnel

- Chris Blair – mastering
- Phil Lee – design
- Stefan De Batselier – photography
- Milo Manara – illustration

== Charts ==
Chart performance for The Vertigo of Bliss
Chart (2003)	Peak position
UK Albums (Official Charts)	48
UK Independent Albums (Official Charts)	6
UK Rock & Metal Albums (Official Charts)	8
Chart (2024)	Peak position
Scottish Albums (Official Charts)	11

== Release history ==
Region	Date	Label	Format	Catalog	Ref.
United Kingdom	16 June 2003	Beggars Banquet Records	CD album	BBQCD233	
United Kingdom	16 June 2003	Beggars Banquet Records	LP record	BBQLP233	
United Kingdom	11 June 2012	Beggars Banquet Records	Double LP	BBQLP2090	
