= Death Penalty (album) =

Studio album by Witchfinder General
- Released: September 1982
- Recorded: 10–11 April 1982
- Studios: Metro Sound (Mansbury, England)
- Genres: Heavy metal; doom metal
- Length: 30:01
- Label: Heavy Metal
- Producer: Peter Hinton

Witchfinder General chronology
Soviet Invasion! (1982)	Death Penalty (1982)	Friends of Hell (1983)

Professional ratings
Review scores
Source	Rating
AllMusic	4/5 stars
The Collector's Guide to Heavy Metal	10/10
Kerrang!	(favourable)

Death Penalty is the debut studio album by the English heavy metal band Witchfinder General. It was released in 1982 on Heavy Metal Records. The album received some criticism for the cover photograph, which featured topless model Joanne Latham. The photograph had been taken in the yard of St Mary the Blessed Virgin Church in Enville, Staffordshire, without the permission of the local Reverend. The album was originally released on LP and picture disc and was later reissued on CD. Pictured on the cover is Phil Cope, Zeeb Parkes, Graham Ditchfield and a member of their road crew. While Peter Hinton is credited with producing this recording, the writers Phil Cope and Zeeb Parkes always felt the credit should have gone to the engineer Robin George.

== Track listing ==
All tracks by Zeeb Parkes and Phil Cope.

Side one

1. "Invisible Hate" – 6:05
2. "Free Country" – 3:10
3. "Death Penalty" – 5:35

Side two

1. "No Stayer" – 4:25
2. "Witchfinder General" – 3:51
3. "Burning a Sinner" – 3:28
4. "R.I.P." – 4:04

== Personnel ==
=== Witchfinder General ===
- Zeeb Parkes – vocals
- Phil Cope – guitars, bass (bass credited as Woolfy Trope)
- Graham Ditchfield – drums

=== Production ===
- Pete Hinton – producer
- Robin George – engineer
- Tim Young – mastering at C.B.S. Studios
- Joanne Latham – cover model
