= Thekidswhopoptodaywillrocktomorrow =

Thekidswhopoptoday willrocktomorrow

EP by Biffy Clyro
- Released: 13 June 2000
- Studio: The Practice Pad (Glasgow, Scotland)
- Genre: Alternative rock
- Length: 17:56
- Label: Electric Honey
- Producer: S.A.G; DP Johnson; Biffy Clyro

Biffy Clyro chronology
Iname (1999)	Thekidswhopoptoday willrocktomorrow (2000)	Blackened Sky (2002)

Thekidswhopoptodaywillrocktomorrow is the debut EP by Biffy Clyro, released in 2000.

== Overview ==
It was a limited edition release on Stow College's Electric Honey label while the band were studying audio there. Thekidswho..., as it is generally referred to, has gone on to be regarded as a seminal release by the band. Three of the tracks feature in later releases ("57" and "Justboy" as album tracks and singles on Blackened Sky, and "Hope for an Angel" as a B-side on the "57" single), but the versions on this early CD differ from those later versions from the Blackened Sky era.

== Track listing ==
Songs and lyrics by Simon Neil. Music by Biffy Clyro.

No.	Title	Length
1.	"57"
2.	"Hope for an Angel"
3.	"Justboy"
4.	"Less the Product"

== Personnel ==
- Simon Neil – guitar, vocals
- James Johnston – bass, vocals
- Ben Johnston – drums, vocals
