= Friends of Hell =

Studio album by Witchfinder General
- Released: 25 November 1983
- Recorded: March 1983
- Studios: Horizon (Coventry, England)
- Genres: Heavy metal; doom metal
- Length: 36:16
- Label: Heavy Metal
- Producer: Robin George

Witchfinder General chronology
Death Penalty (1982)	Friends of Hell (1983)	Resurrected (2008)

Singles from Friends of Hell
- 1. "Music" Released: 1983

Professional ratings
Review scores
Source	Rating
AllMusic	3/5 stars
The Collector's Guide to Heavy Metal	10/10

Friends of Hell is the second studio album by the English doom metal band Witchfinder General. It was released in November 1983 on Heavy Metal Records.

== Track listing ==
All songs by Zeeb Parkes and Phil Cope, except where indicated

Side one

1. "Love on Smack" (Parkes, Cope, Rod Hawkes) – 4:10
2. "Last Chance" – 3:50
3. "Music" – 3:05
4. "Friends of Hell" – 6:12

Side two

1. "Requiem for Youth" – 4:35
2. "Shadowed Images" – 4:15
3. "I Lost You" – 2:55
4. "Quietus" – 6:20
5. "Quietus Reprise" (Cope) – 0:38

== Personnel ==
=== Witchfinder General ===
- Zeeb Parkes – vocals
- Phil Cope – guitars
- Rod Hawkes – bass
- Graham Ditchfield – drums (credited as session drummer)

=== Production ===
- Robin George – producer
- Dave Lester – engineer
- Tim Young – mastering at C.B.S. Studios
- Joanne Latham – cover model
