= Mom's Apple Pie =

- Mom's Apple Pie album cover

Background information
- Origin: Warren, Ohio, United States
- Genres: Rock; hard rock
- Years active: 1970–1974
- Label: Brown Bag

Mom's Apple Pie was an American ten-member rock band from Warren, Ohio. They were best known for the cover of their first album.

== Career ==
The band released two albums, Mom's Apple Pie in 1972 and Mom's Apple Pie II in 1973. A third album was recorded but was not released until 2011. Their manager was Larry Patterson, and they recorded on a record label owned by Terry Knight, Brown Bag Records. The band enjoyed a successful career nationally and toured extensively across the United States. Venues included a wide array of college campuses, clubs, concert halls, the Whiskey A-Go-Go in Los Angeles and Madison Square Garden. They performed with such artists as The Doobie Brothers and David Bowie. Patterson booked the demo session with record producer Kenny Hamann at the Cleveland Recording Company. Pia Knight, Terry's wife, overheard the demo being played in one of the rooms in the back of the recording studio and convinced her husband to sign the group.

Both albums have become favorites among collectors, due in part to the self-titled first album's risqué cover artwork, which contains a subtle depiction of female genitalia. The cover, designed by Nick Caruso, was banned shortly upon the album's release and an alternative cover was released, making both versions highly sought-after among collectors. The same picture was used, but the artist added a miniature brick wall, topped with razor wire, covering up the vulva in the pie, policemen looking in the windows, and a tear running down the woman's face. The third unreleased album tapes have been discovered by Patterson.

== Band members ==
- Joe Ahladis – guitar
- Pat Aulizia – drums
- Bob Fiorino – vocals
- Roger Force – saxophone, flute
- Tony Gigliotti – vocals
- Fred Marzulla – trombone
- Dave Mazzochi – keyboards, vocals
- Bob Miller – lead guitar
- Bob Pinti – trumpet, vocals
- Greg Yochman – bass
