= There's No Such Thing as a Jaggy Snake =

Single by Biffy Clyro

from the album Infinity Land
- B-side: "Hero Management"
- Released: 31 May 2004
- Studio: Monnow Valley Studios (Monmouth, Wales)
- Genre: Alternative rock; math rock; post-hardcore
- Length: 4:50
- Label: Beggars Banquet
- Songwriter(s): Simon Neil
- Producer(s): Chris Sheldon

Biffy Clyro singles chronology
"Eradicate the Doubt" (2003)	"There's No Such Thing as a Jaggy Snake" (2004)	"Glitter and Trauma" (2004)

Infinity Land track listing
- 1. "Glitter and Trauma"; 2. "Strung to Your Ribcage"; 3. "My Recovery Injection"; 4. "Got Wrong"; 5. "The Atrocity"; 6. "Some Kind of Wizard"; 7. "Wave Upon Wave Upon Wave"; 8. "Only One Word Comes to Mind"; 9. "There's No Such Man as Crasp"; 10. "There's No Such Thing as a Jaggy Snake"; 11. "The Kids from Kibble and the Fist of Light"; 12. "The Weapons Are Concealed"; 13. "Pause It and Turn It Up"

"There's No Such Thing as a Jaggy Snake" is a song by Biffy Clyro, and a track from their 2004 album, Infinity Land. It was released as a digital download, and later appeared on the free Kerrang! cover-mounted CD, Best of 2004. The song makes use of changing time signatures and angular guitar riffs. The introduction features lyrics which are screamed rather than sang. The song is regarded by many Biffy Clyro fans, especially in the Facebook fan group, to be the quintessential Biffy Clyro track, as many of the band's styles and sounds are all contained within this one song.

== Musical structure ==
The song, much like most of the band's work around this period, does not follow a conventional verse-chorus structure. It rather features several distinguishable sections with recurring musical ideas and riffs. The song features the band's signature "stop-start" style, with erratic riffs and time signatures.

The song opens with a fast and erratic riff played on a Fender Stratocaster before bursting into a loud distorted guitar section. After the intro comes the first vocal section in which the lyrics are screamed by Neil. After two "verses" in the screaming vocal style, the next sung section begins with the words "take extra special care."

The next section begins with a guitar riff played in a 5/4 time signature. The lyrics "ribs break souls stay bare. Your forked stare cuts through" are the same as those in the preceding a capella track on the album "There's No Such Man as Crasp".

The final section in the song comprises an extended distorted guitar progression before the lyrics "You're facing a pointless task, and it's the same thing. I will face the task" are layered over each other. These lyrics are also adapted from "There's No Such Man as Crasp".

== Track listing ==
Songs and lyrics by Simon Neil. Music by Biffy Clyro.

- Digital download
1. "There's No Such Thing As A Jaggy Snake (alt version)" – 4:50
2. "Hero Management (SBN 2002 Radio Session)" – 4:48

== Personnel ==
- Simon Neil – guitar, vocals
- James Johnston – bass, vocals
- Ben Johnston – drums, vocals
- Chris Sheldon – producer
