= Young Aviators =

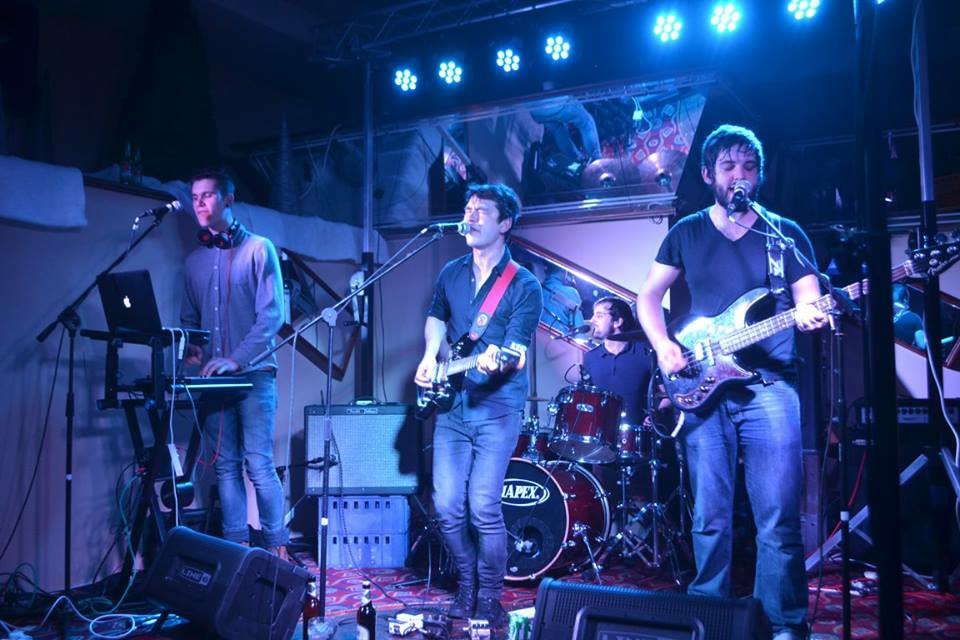
- Young Aviators performing in 2014

Background information
- Origin: Glasgow, Scotland
- Genres: Landfill indie, Alternative rock, post-grunge, indie rock, britpop
- Years active: 2009–2016
- Label: Electric Honey (UK)
- Past members: Decky McKay; John Markey; Kyle Haughey; Oliver Melling
- Website: youngaviators.bandcamp.com

Young Aviators were a Scottish rock band based in Glasgow. They released their debut album Self Help via the label Electric Honey in 2013. They disbanded in 2016.

== History ==
Young Aviators were formed in 2009 by childhood friends Decky McKay (singer/songwriter), Kyle Haughey (bassist) and John Markey (drummer). In 2014 keyboardist Oliver Melling joined the band.

In 2009, they toured the UK with indie rock band Reef. In 2011 they released their EP Hunting for Heaven, which was favourably reviewed in musicOMH, and toured with The Subways in the UK.

In 2012, they released their debut album Self Help under the indie label Electric Honey. This became the biggest selling CD album in the labels history.

The band toured in the UK, Germany and Austria tour supporting Sportfreunde Stiller and had a supporting slot on tour with indie group Travis.

In August 2015, they released a music video on YouTube to accompany their new single "Drive-Thru Culture Night".

Frontman Decky McKay went on to found alt-country band The Vicuñas in 2017. They released their self-titled EP in April 2018.

Following a hiatus, the group released their latest EP 'Embrace the Inescapable' with Electric Honey in early 2023.
