= Justboy =

Single by Biffy Clyro

from the album Blackened Sky
- B-side: "Being Gabriel"; "Unsubtle"
- Released: 1 October 2001
- Studio: The Practice Pad (Glasgow, Scotland)
- Genre: Alternative rock
- Length: 4:23
- Label: Beggars Banquet
- Songwriter: Simon Neil
- Producer: Chris Sheldon

Biffy Clyro singles chronology
"27" (2000)	"Justboy" (2001)	"57" (2002)

Blackened Sky track listing
- 1. "Joy.Discovery.Invention"; 2. "27"; 3. "Justboy"; 4. "Kill the Old, Torture Their Young"; 5. "The Go-Slow"; 6. "Christopher's River"; 7. "Convex, Concave"; 8. "57"; 9. "Hero Management"; 10. "Solution Devices"; 11. "Stress on the Sky"; 12. "Scary Mary"

thekidswhopoptodaywillrocktomorrow track listing
- 1. "57"; 2. "Hope for an Angel"; 3. "Justboy"; 4. "Less the Product"

"Justboy" is a song by Biffy Clyro from their 2002 debut album, Blackened Sky, released as the album's second single.

== Overview ==
Simon Neil has commented on the song, saying:

That's one of the first songs I ever wrote that I thought was quite good. I had discovered bands like Far and Mineral and this song was a product of that.

== Track listings ==
Songs and lyrics by Simon Neil. Music by Biffy Clyro.

- CD
1. "Justboy" – 4:23
2. "Being Gabriel" – 6:20
3. "Unsubtle" – 2:27

== Personnel ==
- Simon Neil – guitar, vocals
- James Johnston – bass, vocals
- Ben Johnston – drums, vocals
- Chris Sheldon – producer
