= 57 (song) =

2002 single by Biffy Clyro

Single by Biffy Clyro

from the album Blackened Sky
- B-side: "Hope for an Angel"; "Time as an Imploding Unit/Waiting for Green"; "Kill the Old, Torture Their Young" (Evening Session Version)
- Released: 4 February 2002
- Studio: The Practice Pad (Glasgow, Scotland)
- Genre: Post-grunge; alternative rock; hard rock
- Length: 3:22
- Label: Beggars Banquet
- Songwriter: Simon Neil
- Producer: Chris Sheldon

Biffy Clyro singles chronology
"Justboy" (2001)	"57" (2002)	"Joy.Discovery.Invention/Toys, Toys, Toys, Choke, Toys, Toys, Toys" (2002)

Blackened Sky track listing
- 1. "Joy.Discovery.Invention"; 2. "27"; 3. "Justboy"; 4. "Kill the Old, Torture Their Young"; 5. "The Go-Slow"; 6. "Christopher's River"; 7. "Convex, Concave"; 8. "57"; 9. "Hero Management"; 10. "Solution Devices"; 11. "Stress on the Sky"; 12. "Scary Mary"

thekidswhopoptodaywillrocktomorrow track listing
- 1. "57"; 2. "Hope for an Angel"; 3. "Justboy"; 4. "Less the Product"

"57" is a song by Biffy Clyro from their 2002 debut album, Blackened Sky.

== Information ==
This song was the third single from Blackened Sky. An early version of it, with different vocals and guitars, appeared on their debut EP, thekidswhopoptodaywillrocktomorrow. Most of the song is played in 4/4, with an outro in 6/4. Also when played live it is sped up noticeably.

== Track listings ==
Songs and lyrics by Simon Neil. Music by Biffy Clyro.

- CD BBQ358CD
1. "57" – 3:22
2. "Hope for an Angel" (Radio 1 Session) – 4:06
3. "Time as an Imploding Unit/Waiting for Green" – 9:24
- 7" BBQ358
1. "57" – 3:22
2. "Kill the Old, Torture Their Young" (Evening Session Version) – 6:10

== Personnel ==
- Simon Neil – guitar, vocals
- James Johnston – bass, vocals
- Ben Johnston – drums, vocals
- Chris Sheldon – producer
