= Iname (song) =

Single by Biffy Clyro
- B-side: "All the Way Down (Chapter 2)"; "Travis Perkins"
- Released: 28 June 1999
- Recorded: Scotland
- Genre: Alternative rock
- Length: 3:07
- Label: Babi Yaga
- Songwriter: Simon Neil
- Producers: Campbell McNeil; Biffy Clyro

Biffy Clyro singles chronology
"Iname" (1999)	"27" (2000)

"Iname" is the debut single by Scottish band Biffy Clyro, released on 28 June 1999 on Aereogramme's independent label Babi Yaga. This first release led to the band being chosen by Stow College's Electric Honey label to release their debut EP, thekidswhopoptodaywillrocktomorrow.

== Track listings ==
Songs and lyrics by Simon Neil. Music by Biffy Clyro.

- CD
1. "Iname" – 3:07
2. "All the Way Down (Chapter 2)" – 3:16
3. "Travis Perkins" – 2:24

== Personnel ==
- Simon Neil – guitar, vocals
- James Johnston – bass, vocals
- Ben Johnston – drums, vocals
