= Linford Manor =

Mansion converted into a recording studio in Buckinghamshire

Coordinates: 52.0723°N 0.7578°W

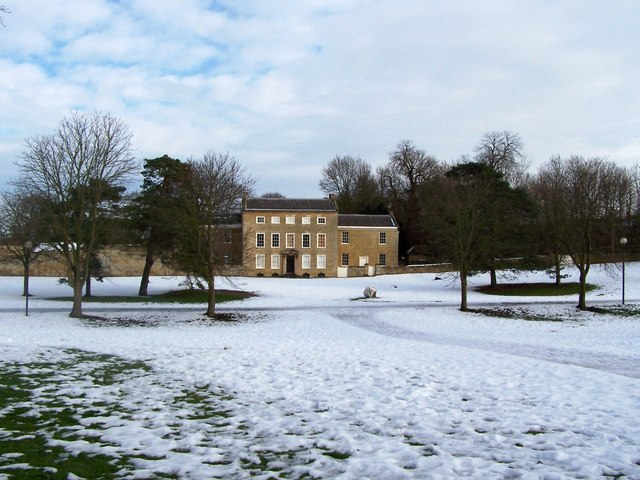
Linford Manor.

Linford Manor, also known as Great Linford Manor, is a seventeenth-century mansion or manor house converted into a recording studio complex in Great Linford, a district in Milton Keynes, England. It is now owned by Pete Winkelman, former chairman of Milton Keynes Dons football club.

== History ==
The current manor was originally built in 1678 by Sir William Pritchard on land bought from the Napier family a little downhill from the site of an older medieval manor. In 1704, the manor passed to the Uthwatts, his relatives, who extended the house over time. It was originally the manor of Little Linford as well as of Great Linford.

The four descending ponds are fed by springs that still flow today. Two of the ponds exist on the Manor side of the Grand Union Canal, a third was destroyed during construction and the fourth is still extant on the Railway Path side of the canal and can be accessed via steps from that pathway.

=== Since 1970 ===
In 1972 the Manor was bought by Milton Keynes Development Corporation to be an arts centre, flourished briefly with MKDC's financial support, but was closed in 1984.

In 1984/85 Harry Maloney bought the manor and converted it into a residential recording studio. The main studio housed a 48 channel/56 frame SSL recording/mixing desk, and was one of the first UK studios to invest in digital recording. Accommodation for artists and producers was offered upstairs in the manor house. A second studio was built in one of the Pavilion Houses opposite the manor (now returned to community arts use). The Pavilion Studio housed a customised vintage analogue Shep/Neve inline desk. Accommodation for artists using this studio was in one of the Alms Houses next to the church in the manor park.

Directed by Harry Maloney in the mid-1980s through to the early 1990s, Paul Ward acted as technical manager, Bindi Belle (previously known as Mandie Emmings) bookings manager, Steve Groom house maintenance and gardens, Gary Wilkinson, Nick Blundell & Gordon Bonnar (formerly of the band 'Heavy Pettin') as in-house recording engineers. Dan Short was an assistant engineer.

The surrounding parkland remains open to the public and is now owned by Milton Keynes Parks Trust. The park hosted the MK Food Fest for three years from 2017-2019.

In 1993, Pete Winkelman bought the manor, and continued using the property as a recording studio. Over this time the manor became less used for music recording. Pete Winkelman now uses the manor as his family home.

== Artists ==
Many recording artists and record producers both British and international recorded at the manor during the period in which it was in use as a recording studio.

Biffy Clyro recorded their second album, The Vertigo of Bliss, there - and, according to an urban myth, took just 24 hours to do so. Other artists to record there include: PJ Harvey.

During an Instagram Q&A session, Jay Kay from Jamiroquai confirmed that the album Travelling Without Moving was recorded at Great Linford Manor.

== Original grounds of the Manor ==
The former stables and associated gate houses are now an Arts Centre. The former almshouses beside the stables are now used as artists' studios. The Grand Union Canal runs near the manor house: it originally had its own wharf here (independent of the Great Linford wharf).
