= List of songs recorded by Cardiacs =

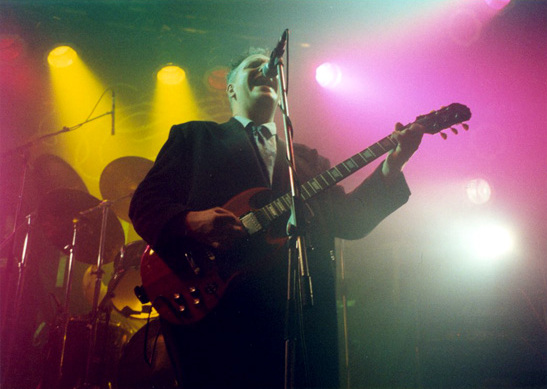
Tim Smith, the primary songwriter, frontman and producer of Cardiacs, performing with the band in 1999

The English rock band Cardiacs have recorded material for six studio albums under the leadership of the band's primary songwriter, frontman and producer Tim Smith, along with several EPs, singles and rarities compilations. Tim formed Cardiacs, initially known as Cardiac Arrest, with his brother Jim as a raw, avant-punk band in 1977. Their first release was the single "A Bus for a Bus on the Bus", or the Cardiac Arrest E.P., in 1979, which they followed with the full-length cassette albums The Obvious Identity and Toy World in 1980 and 1981, the latter being the first release under the name Cardiacs. The band’s own label, The Alphabet Business Concern, launched in 1984, the year the band's third cassette-only album The Seaside released.

Following the band's DIY tape releases, their 1987 EP Big Ship began Cardiacs' recorded legacy in ernest. The five song mini-album included the song "Tarred and Feathered" co-written with Bill Drake, whose video aired on The Tube on 17 April 1987 and became known for its eccentricity. The band's early work culminated in the 1988 release of A Little Man and a House and the Whole World Window, Cardiacs' first "proper" studio album following the band's mini and demo albums. Three songs on A Little Man and a House appeared in more primitive forms on the band’s earlier releases, including the single "Is This the Life", which was played on Radio 1 and peaked at No 80, acting as an entry point into the band for listeners and becoming the best-known Cardiacs song. To consolidate the success of "Is This the Life", Cardiacs released their follow-up single "Susannah's Still Alive" in 1988, a version of Dave Davies' and the Kinks' hit from 1967. Their follow-up album, 1989's On Land and in the Sea, featured compositions with more moving pieces and shifting tempos, including "The Duck and Roger the Horse" and the eight and a half minute long closing track "The Everso Closely Guarded Line", co-written by William D. Drake.

Tim Smith, the band's singer, guitarist and chief songwriter, embedded complex chord progressions and time signature changes into his work, which was performed by up to seven band members by the 1990 video Maresnest. By Cardiacs' 1992 album Heaven Born and Ever Bright, the band displayed a harder edged, metal-leaning sound which they retained for their two subsequent albums Sing to God (1996) and Guns (1999). Sing to God features the Jon Poole-penned compositions "Bell Stinks", "Bell Clinks" and "Angleworm Angel" from the repertoire of the live thrash band Panixsphere. Bob Leith also collaborated on Sing to God, contributing lyrics to the songs "Eat It Up Worms Hero", "Dirty Boy" and "Nurses Whispering Verses". The band's 2002 Greatest Hits album saw the release of "Faster than Snakes with a Ball and a Chain", a track which was originally intended for Guns. In 2003, Cardiacs played three concerts at The Garage in London performing songs from their early years of 1977 to 1983, with the material released as the two-volume live album The Special Garage Concerts in 2005.

Cardiacs re-emerged in late 2007 with the Org Records single "Ditzy Scene", co-written by Smith and Kavus Torabi who wrote the song's words, to promote the proposed double album LSD. In June 2008, Smith suffered a heart attack that led to being semi-paralysed from dystonia, and Cardiacs went on indefinite hiatus. Through Smith had recorded most of LSD, the songs remain unreleased. After Smith died in 2020, surviving members of Cardiacs and the band’s label Alphabet Business Concern shared the previously unreleased song "Vermin Mangle" on the day of Smith's funeral. A Little Man and a House and the Whole World Window was reissued as a boxset in 2023, with three additional discs featuring radio and studio sessions and a 1987 live show. A Big Book and a Band and Whole World Window, a visual biography of the band, was published in 2025 containing a vinyl 7" record of the previously unreleased track "Aukamakic/Dead Mouse" from the Cardiac Arrest E.P. sessions, as well as "Faster than Snakes with a Ball and a Chain".

== Songs ==
All information is sourced from the liner notes of the releases, except where noted.

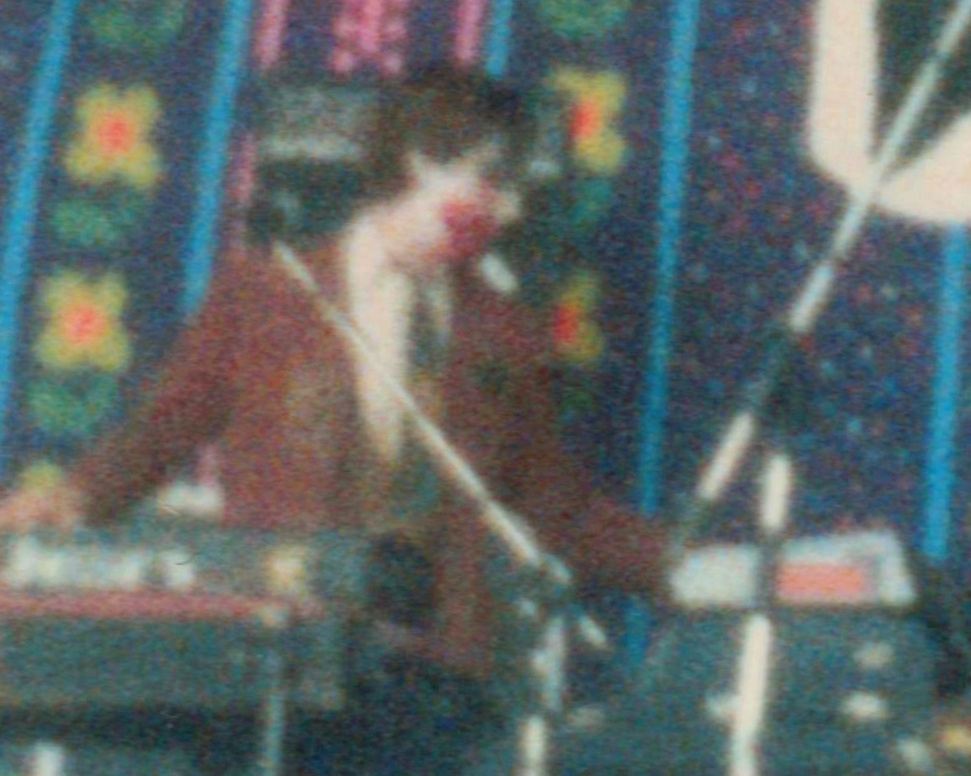
Beginning with "The Whole World Window", William D. Drake co-wrote several songs including "The Everso Closely Guarded Line".

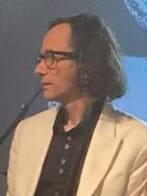
Christian Hayes co-wrote three songs on Heaven Born and Ever Bright.

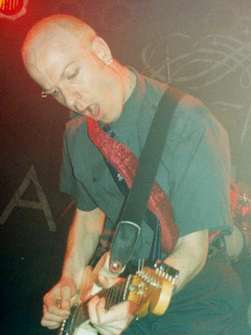
Jon Poole penned the Sing to God compositions "Bell Stinks", "Bell Clinks" and "Angleworm Angel" from the repertoire of the thrash band Panixsphere.

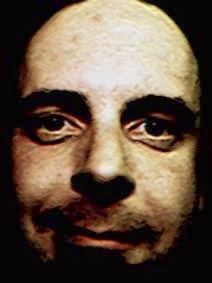
Bob Leith contributed lyrics to songs on Sing to God and Guns.

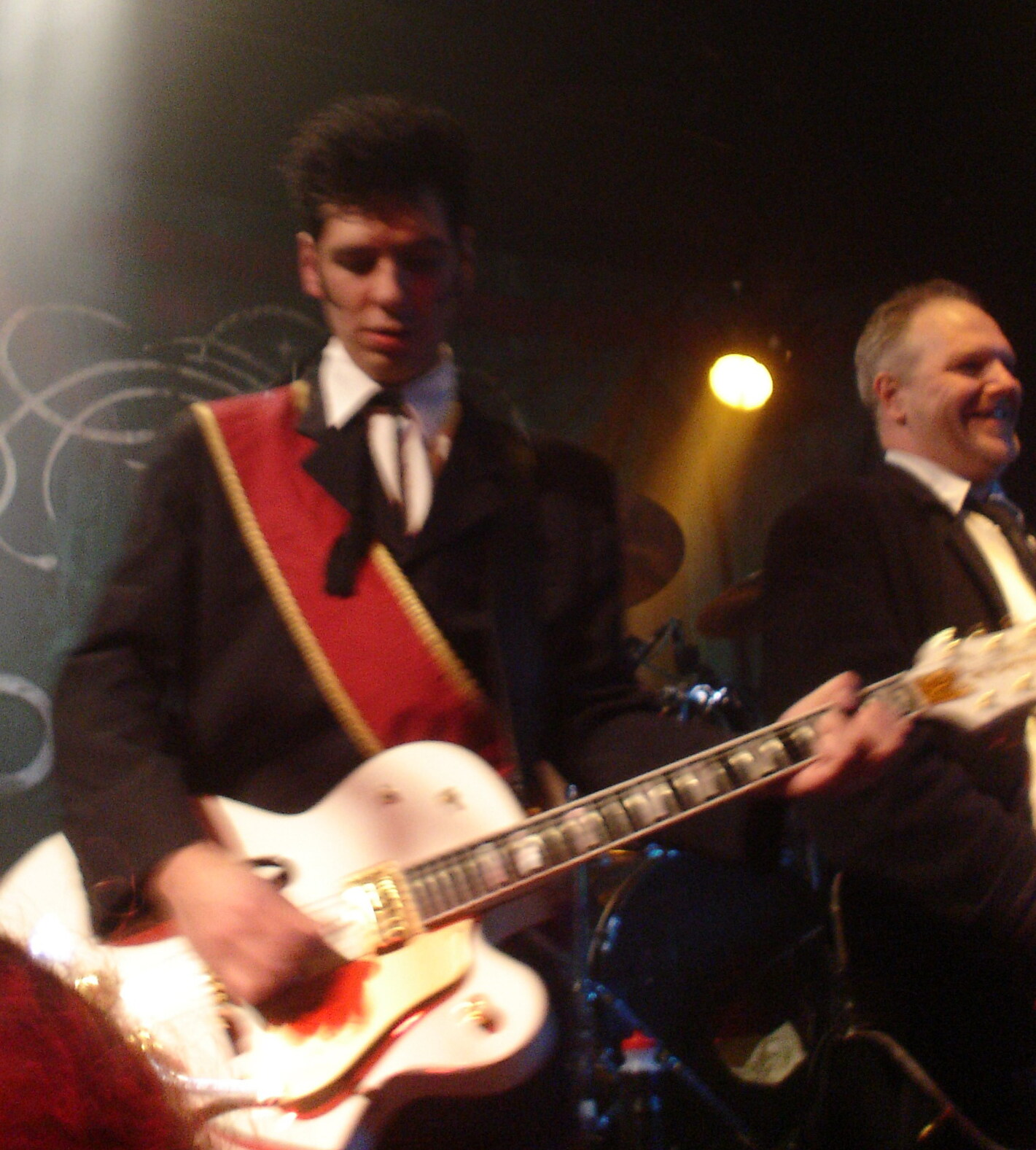
Kavus Torabi (left) co-wrote the single "Ditzy Scene" with Tim Smith, writing the words.

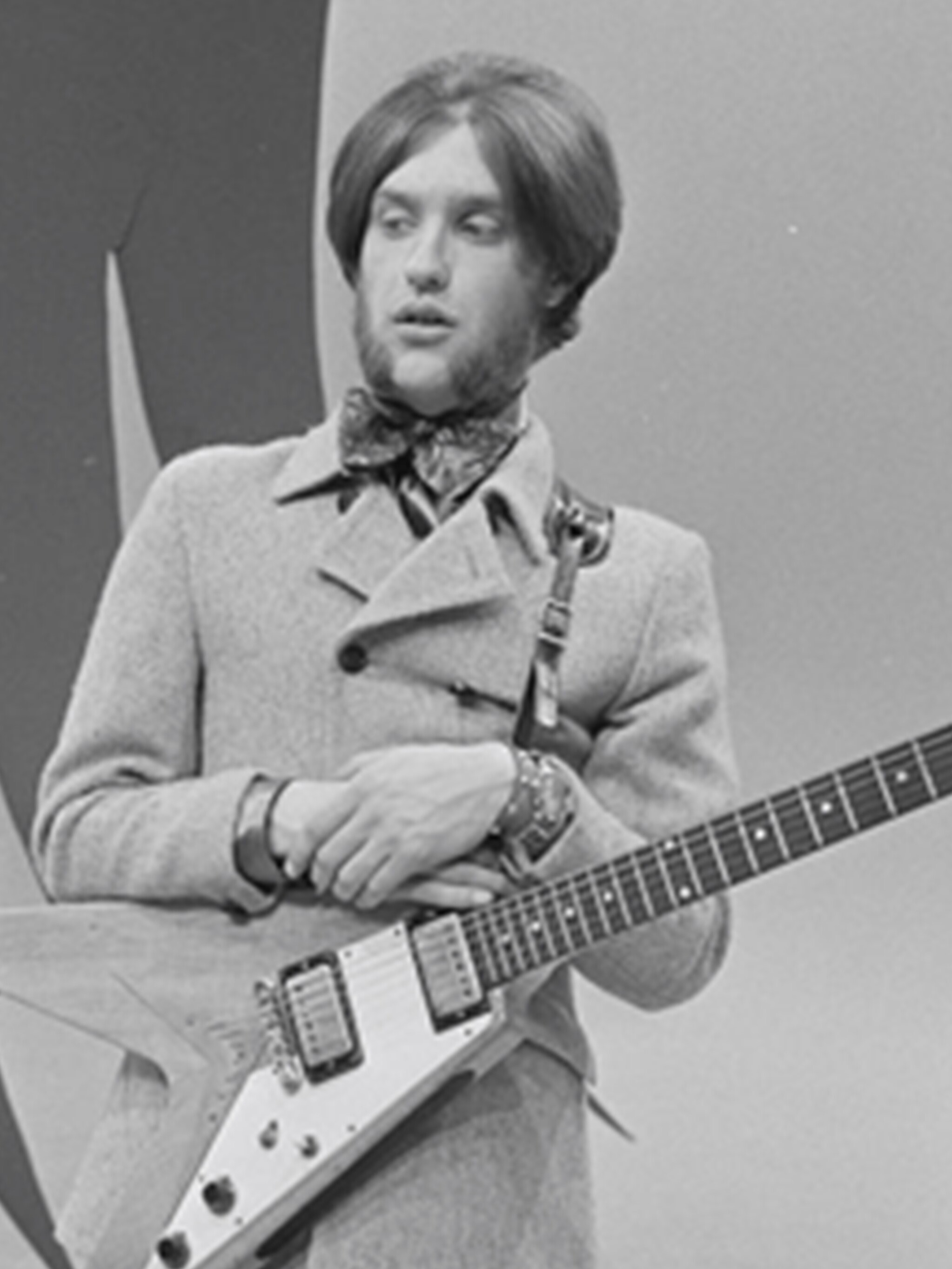
Cardiacs recorded "Susannah's Still Alive" by Dave Davies and the Kinks.

List of songs, showing writer(s), release(s), and year of original release
Song	Writer(s)		Release(s)	Year
Song	Music	Words	Release(s)	Year
"Ain't He Messy Though"	Tim Smith (Note: Additional lyrics by Bob Leith)		Guns	1999
"All His Geese Are Swans" (Note: Also written "All His Geese Are Swans!" with an exclamation mark)	Tim Smith		"Susannah's Still Alive" (12"); Songs for Ships and Irons	1988
"All Spectacular"	Tim Smith		"There's Too Many Irons in the Fire"; A Little Man and a House and the Whole World Window (Torso CD extra track); Songs for Ships and Irons; All That Glitters Is a Mares Nest; A Little Man and a House and the Whole World Window: Special Edition (as 2021 Remaster)	1987
"The Alphabet Business Concern"	The A.B. Concern		On Land and in the Sea (Note: Only listed on the original LP label)	1989
"The Alphabet Business Concern (Home of Fadeless Splendour)"	Tim Smith; Jim Smith		Heaven Born and Ever Bright	1992
"Angleworm Angel"	Jon Poole		Sampler (as "Angleworm the Angel"); Sing to God	1995
"An Ant"	Tim Smith	an actual Ant	The Special Garage Concerts; Some Fairytales from the Rotten Shed	2005
"Anything I Can't Eat"	Tim Smith		Heaven Born and Ever Bright	1992
"Arnald"	Tim Smith		On Land and in the Sea; All That Glitters Is a Maresnest	1989
"As Cold as Can Be in an English Sea"	Tim Smith	Tim Smith; Mark Cawthra; Jim Smith	Toy World	1981
"As Cold as Can Be in an English Sea"	Tim Smith		Archive Cardiacs; The Special Garage Concerts; Some Fairytales from the Rotten Shed	1981
"Aukamakic"	Tim Smith	Tim Smith; Mark Cawthra; Jim Smith	Toy World (as "Aukamacic")	1981
"Aukamakic"	Tim Smith		Archive Cardiacs (as "Aukamacic"); The Special Garage Concerts; Some Fairytales from the Rotten Shed; Cardiacs E.P. (as "Aukamakic/Dead Mouse")	1981
"Baby Heart Dirt"	Tim Smith		"Baby Heart Dirt"; On Land and in the Sea; All That Glitters Is a Maresnest	1989
"A Balloon for Bertie's Party"	Tim Smith		The Obvious Identity; The Special Garage Concerts	1980
"Bell Clinks"	Jon Poole		Sing to God	1996
"Bell Stinks"	Jon Poole		Sing to God	1996
"Bellyeye"	Tim Smith		"Bellyeye"; Sing to God	1995
"A Big Noise in a Toy World"	Tim Smith; Mark Cawthra	Tim Smith; Mark Cawthra; Jim Smith	Toy World	1981
"Big Ship"	Tim Smith		Rude Bootleg; Big Ship; Cardiacs Live; Songs for Ships and Irons; All That Glitters Is a Maresnest; Sampler	1986
"Billion"	Tim Smith		Sing to God	1996
"Bite 3/a"	Tim Smith		The Obvious Identity	1980
"Blind in Safety and Leafy in Love"	William D. Drake; Tim Smith		"Susannah's Still Alive"; Songs for Ships and Irons; Sampler	1988
"The Blue and Buff"	Tim Smith		LSD	2025
"Bodysbad"	Tim Smith		Heaven Born and Ever Bright	1992
"The Breakfast Line"	Tim Smith		A Little Man and a House and the Whole World Window; Greatest Hits	1988
"Breed"	Tim Smith		LSD	2025
"Buds and Spawn"	Tim Smith		Radio 1 Sessions / The Evening Show; On Land and in the Sea; Greatest Hits	1988
"Burn Your House Brown"	Tim Smith		Big Ship; Songs for Ships and Irons; Sampler	1987
"Busty Beez"	Tim Smith		LSD	2025
"A Bus for a Bus on the Bus"	Tim Smith; Michael Pugh		Cardiac Arrest E.P.	1979
"A Bus for a Bus on the Bus"	Tim Smith		The Special Garage Concerts; Some Fairytales from the Rotten Shed	1979
"By Numbers"	Tim Smith		LSD	2025
"A Cake for Bertie's Party"	Tim Smith; Jim Smith; Colvin Mayers		Cardiac Arrest E.P.	1979
"A Cake for Bertie's Party"	Tim Smith	Mick Pugh	The Special Garage Concerts	1979
"A Cake for Bertie's Party"	Tim Smith; Mick Pugh		Some Fairytales from the Rotten Shed	1979
"Cameras"	Mark Cawthra arr. Tim Smith		The Obvious Identity	1980
"Cameras"	Tim Smith		Radio 1 Sessions / The Evening Show (as "Cameras/Is This the Life")	1980
"Cameras"	Tim Smith; William D. Drake; Mark Cawthra		Cardiacs Live	1980
"Clean That Evil Mud out Your Soul"	Tim Smith		Guns	1999
"Come Back Clammy Lammy"	Tim Smith		Guns	1999
"Core"	Tim Smith; Christian Hayes (Note: Hayes is only credited on original 1992 versions of Heaven Born and Ever Bright)		Heaven Born and Ever Bright; Greatest Hits	1992
"Cry Wet Smile Dry"	Tim Smith		Guns	1999
"Day Is Gone"	Tim Smith		"Day Is Gone"; Heaven Born and Ever Bright	1991
"Dead Mouse"	Tim Smith	Tim Smith; Mark Cawthra; Jim Smith	Toy World	1981
"Dead Mouse"	Tim Smith		The Special Garage Concerts; Cardiacs E.P. (as "Aukamakic/Dead Mouse")	1981
"Devils"	Tim Smith		"Odd Even"	1995
"Dinner Time"	Tim Smith		The Seaside; The Special Garage Concerts (as "Dinnertime Is at Home (Not Here)")	1984
"Dirty Boy"	Tim Smith	Tim Smith; Bob Leith	Sing to God; Cardiacs Meet Camp Blackfoot; Greatest Hits	1996
"Ditzy Scene"	Tim Smith	Kavus Torabi	"Ditzy Scene"; LSD	2007
"Dive"	Tim Smith		A Little Man and a House and the Whole World Window	1988
"Dog-Like Sparky" (Note: Sometimes unhyphenated as "Dog Like Sparky" on versions of Sing to God since 2014)	Tim Smith		Sing to God "Signs" (Instrumental)	1996
"Downup"	Tim Smith		"Downup"; LSD	2025
"The Duck and Roger the Horse"	Tim Smith		On Land and in the Sea; All That Glitters Is a Maresnest	1989
"Eat It Up Worms Hero"	Tim Smith	Tim Smith; Bob Leith	Sing to God	1996
"Eden on the Air"	Tim Smith		Sing to God; Cardiacs and Affectionate Friends	1996
"The Everso Closely Guarded Line"	William D. Drake; Tim Smith		On Land and in the Sea; Sampler	1989
"Everything Is Easy"	Tim Smith		Songs for Ships and Irons (Note: Also written "Everything Is Easy!" with an exclamation mark); All That Glitters Is a Maresnest	1991
"Fairy Mary Mag"	Tim Smith		Sing to God; Greatest Hits	1996
"Fast Robert"	Tim Smith		On Land and in the Sea; All That Glitters Is a Maresnest	1989
"Faster than Snakes with a Ball and a Chain"	Tim Smith		Greatest Hits; Cardiacs E.P. (2024 Remastered)	2002
"Fiery Gun Hand"	Tim Smith		Sing to God	1996
"Flap Off You Beak"	Tim Smith		Sing to God	1996
"Food on the Wall"	Colvin Mayers		Cardiac Arrest E.P. The Special Garage Concerts	1979
"For Good and All"	Tim Smith; Christian Hayes (Note: Hayes is not credited in the 1995 CD liner notes but still on the CD itself)		Heaven Born and Ever Bright	1992
"Foundling"	Tim Smith		Sing to God; Cardiacs Meet Camp Blackfoot; Cardiacs and Affectionate Friends	1996
"A Game for Bertie's Party"	Tim Smith; Mark Cawthra		The Obvious Identity; Archive Cardiacs; The Special Garage Concerts	1980
"Gen"	Tim Smith		"Ditzy Scene"; LSD	2007
"Gina Lollobrigida"	Tim Smith		The Seaside (also "Gena Lola" and "Gena Lolla Brigida" on some versions; "Gena Lollabridgida" on 1990 and 1995 reissue); Cardiacs Live; The Special Garage Concerts (as "Gena Lollabridgida"); A Little Man and a House and the Whole World Window: Special Edition (as "Gina Lollabrigida" {Unreleased 2021 Remaster})	1984
"Gloomy News"	Tim Smith		The Special Garage Concerts	2005
"Goodbye Grace"	Tim Smith; Christian Hayes (Note: Hayes is only credited on Heaven Born and Ever Bright, and only since the 1995 release)		Heaven Born and Ever Bright; Sampler	1992
"Goosegash"	Tim Smith		"Is This the Life" (12"); A Little Man and a House and the Whole World Window (Torso CD extra track); Cardiacs Live; A Little Man and a House and the Whole World Window: Special Edition (as 2021 Remaster)	1988
"Helen and Heaven"	Tim Smith; Christian Hayes		Heaven Born and Ever Bright	1992
"Hello Mr Minnow"	Tim Smith		The Special Garage Concerts; Some Fairytales from the Rotten Shed	2005
"Hello Mr Sparrow"	Tim Smith; Sarah Smith	Tim Smith (Note: Lyrics only credited in the Cardiacs Book. Elsewhere, only the writers of the music are listed.)	The Seaside; The Special Garage Concerts; Some Fairytales from the Rotten Shed	1984
"Hope Day"	Tim Smith		The Seaside; Seaside Treats (1985); The Special Garage Concerts	1984
"Hopeless"	Mark Cawthra		The Special Garage Concerts; Some Fairytales from the Rotten Shed	2005
"A Horse's Tail"	Jon Poole		"Bellyeye"; Sing to God	1995
"Horsehead"	Tim Smith		"Baby Heart Dirt" (12") (as "Horse Head"); On Land and in the Sea (Note: "Horsehead" is excluded from vinyl versions of On Land and in the Sea.)	1989
"Hurricane"	Tim Smith		"Odd Even"	1995
"I Hold My Love in My Arms"	William D. Drake; Tim Smith		"Baby Heart Dirt"; On Land and in the Sea; All That Glitters Is a Maresnest	1989
"I'm Eating in Bed"	Tim Smith; William D. Drake		Rude Bootleg "Is This the Life"; A Little Man and a House and the Whole World Window (Note: Extra track on 1988 Torso CD version and included on subsequent CD and digital releases only)	1986
"Ice a Spot and a Dot on the Dog"	Tim Smith	Tim Smith; Mark Cawthra	The Seaside; The Special Garage Concerts	1984
"The Icing on the World"	Tim Smith		Rude Bootleg; A Little Man and a House and the Whole World Window; Cardiacs Live	1986
"Icky Qualms"	Tim Smith	Tim Smith; Mark Cawthra; Jim Smith	Toy World	1981
"Icky Qualms"	Tim Smith		Archive Cardiacs; The Special Garage Concerts; Some Fairytales from the Rotten Shed	1989
"Ideal"	Tim Smith		"Day Is Gone"	1991
"In a City Lining"	Tim Smith		Rude Bootleg; A Little Man and a House and the Whole World Window; Cardiacs Live	1986
"Insect Hoofs on Lassie"	Tim Smith		Sing to God; Cardiacs Meet Camp Blackfoot (Instrumental)	1996
"Interlude"	Tim Smith		A Little Man and a House and the Whole World Window	1988
"Is This the Life"	Tim Smith	Tim Smith; Mark Cawthra; Jim Smith	Toy World (as "Is This the Life?")	1981
"Is This the Life"	Tim Smith		The Seaside; Rude Bootleg; Radio 1 Sessions / The Evening Show (as "Cameras/Is This the Life") "Is This the Life" (1988); A Little Man and a House and the Whole World Window; Cardiacs Live; All That Glitters Is a Maresnest; Sampler	1981
"It's a Lovely Day"	Tim Smith; Colvin Mayers; Mark Cawthra; Sarah Smith (Note: Sarah Smith isn't listed as a writer on the first 1995 version of the All That Glitters Is a Mares Nest CD)	Tim Smith	The Seaside; All That Glitters Is a Maresnest; The Special Garage Concerts	1984
"Jibber and Twitch"	Tim Smith		The Seaside; The Special Garage Concerts (as "Gibber and Twitch"); Some Fairytales from the Rotten Shed	1984
"Jitterbug (Junior Is A)"	Tim Smith		Guns; Cardiacs and Affectionate Friends	1999
"Joining the Plankton"	Tim Smith		"Day Is Gone"	1991
"The Leader of the Starry Skys" (Note: Written "The Leader of the Starry Skies" in the 1995 All That Glitters Is a Mares Nest CD and all digital versions)	Tim Smith		On Land and in the Sea; All That Glitters Is a Maresnest	1989
"Leaf Scrapings"	Tim Smith; Cardiac Arrest		The Obvious Identity	1980
"Leaf Scrapings"	Tim Smith		The Special Garage Concerts	1980
"Let Alone My Plastic Doll"	Tim Smith		The Obvious Identity; The Special Garage Concerts	1980
"A Little Man and a House"	Tim Smith		The Seaside; Seaside Treats; A Little Man and a House and the Whole World Window	1984
"Loosefish Scapegrace"	Tim Smith		"There's Too Many Irons in the Fire"; A Little Man and a House and the Whole World Window (Torso CD extra track) (as "Loosefish Scape Grace"); Cardiacs Live; Songs for Ships and Irons; A Little Man and a House and the Whole World Window: Special Edition (as 2021 Remaster)	1987
"Lovely Eyes"	Tim Smith		LSD	2025
"Made All Up"	Tim Smith	Kavus Torabi	"Ditzy Scene"; LSD	2007
"Manhoo"	Jon Poole	Jon Poole; Tim Smith	"Manhoo"; Sing to God	1995
"Manhoo"	Jon Poole		Greatest Hits	1995
"March"	Tim Smith		Heaven Born and Ever Bright	1992
"Mare's Nest" (Note: Often written without an apostrophe in physical releases when not handwritten)	William D. Drake; Tim Smith		On Land and in the Sea; Greatest Hits	1989
"The May"	Tim Smith		LSD	2025
"Men in Bed"	Tim Smith		LSD	2025
"My Trade Mark"	Tim Smith	Tim Smith; Mark Cawthra; Jim Smith	Toy World (as "Trade Mark")	1981
"My Trade Mark"	Tim Smith		Archive Cardiacs; The Special Garage Concerts; Some Fairytales from the Rotten Shed	1981
"No Bright Side"	Tim Smith	Tim Smith; Christian Hayes (Note: The "Day Is Gone" release only features lyric credit in the folded insert, not the disc or label, so Smith is otherwise credited as the sole writer.)	"Day Is Gone"	1991
"No Gold"	Tim Smith		"Bellyeye"; Sing to God; Cardiacs and Affectionate Friends	1995
"Nurses Whispering Verses"	Tim Smith	Tim Smith; Mark Cawthra; Jim Smith	Toy World	1981
"Nurses Whispering Verses"	Tim Smith		The Seaside	1981
"Nurses Whispering Verses"	Tim Smith	Tim Smith; Bob Leith	Sing to God	1981
"The Obvious Identity"	Tim Smith		The Obvious Identity; Archive Cardiacs; The Special Garage Concerts	1980
"Odd Even"	Tim Smith		"Odd Even"; Sing to God; Greatest Hits	1995
"Over + Over + Over + Over"	Colvin Mayers (Note: Credited as Max Mayers); Tim Smith		Toy World	1981
"Pet Fezant"	Tim Smith	Emily Ashworth-Jones	LSD	2025
"Piffol Four Times"	Tim Smith		Archive Cardiacs; Sampler	1989
"Piffol One Time"	Tim Smith		Archive Cardiacs	1989
"Piffol Three Times"	Tim Smith		Archive Cardiacs	1989
"Pilf"	Tim Smith		The Obvious Identity; The Special Garage Concerts	1980
"Pip As Uncle Dick but Peter Spoiled It"	Tim Smith	Tim Smith; Mark Cawthra	The Obvious Identity (as "Pip As Uncle Dick but Peter Spoilt It")	1980
"Pip As Uncle Dick but Peter Spoiled It"	Tim Smith	Mark Cawthra	The Special Garage Concerts	1980
"Pip As Uncle Dick but Peter Spoiled It"	Tim Smith; Mark Cawthra		Some Fairytales from the Rotten Shed	1980
"Plane Plane Against the Grain"	Tim Smith		Big Ship; Songs for Ships and Irons; Greatest Hits	1987
"Quiet as a Mouse"			Sing to God	1996
"R.E.S."	Tim Smith		The Seaside; Seaside Treats; Radio 1 Sessions / The Evening Show; A Little Man and a House and the Whole World Window; All That Glitters Is a Maresnest; The Special Garage Concerts	1984
"Red Fire Coming Out from His Gills"	Tim Smith		Sing to God	1996
"Rock Around the Clock"	Colvin Mayers; Tim Smith		The Obvious Identity	1980
"Rock Around the Clock"	Colvin Mayers		Archive Cardiacs; The Special Garage Concerts; Some Fairytales from the Rotten Shed	1980
"A Roll from a Dirty Place"	Tim Smith		LSD	2025
"The Safety Bowl"	Tim Smith		"Baby Heart Dirt" (12"); On Land and in the Sea	1989
"Sang 'All Away Away!'" (Note: Sometimes written with no exclamation mark)	Tim Smith		"Signs"	1999
"Scratching Crawling Crawling"	Tim Smith	Tim Smith; Mark Cawthra; Jim Smith	Toy World	1981
"Scratching Crawling Crawling"	Tim Smith		Archive Cardiacs; The Special Garage Concerts; Some Fairytales from the Rotten Shed	1981
"She Is Hiding Behind the Shed"	Tim Smith		Heaven Born and Ever Bright; Greatest Hits	1992
"Signs"	Tim Smith		"Signs"; Guns	1999
"Skating"	Tim Smith	Joanne Spratley	LSD	2025
"Sleep All Eyes Open"	Tim Smith		Cardiacs Meet Camp Blackfoot; Guns	1999
"Snakes-a-Sleeping"	Tim Smith		Heaven Born and Ever Bright	1992
"Song of a Dead Pest"	Tim Smith		Guns	1999
"Spelled All Wrong"	Tim Smith		LSD	2025
"Spell with a Shell"	Tim Smith		Guns	1999
"Spinney"	Tim Smith		"Manhoo"	1995
"The Stench of Honey"	Tim Smith		On Land and in the Sea	1989
"Stoneage Dinosaurs"	Tim Smith		Big Ship; Songs for Ships and Irons	1987
"Susannah's Still Alive"	Dave Davies		"Susannah's Still Alive"	1988
"T.V.T.V."	Tim Smith		Archive Cardiacs	1989
"Tarred and Feathered"	Tim Smith; William D. Drake		Rude Bootleg; Big Ship; Cardiacs Live; On Land and in the Sea (unlisted Torso CD extra track); Songs for Ships and Irons; All That Glitters Is a Maresnest; Sampler	1986
"There's Good Cud"	Tim Smith		Guns; Greatest Hits	1999
"There's Too Many Irons in the Fire"	Tim Smith		"There's Too Many Irons in the Fire" "Is This the Life" (Torso 12"); A Little Man and a House and the Whole World Window (Torso CD extra track); Cardiacs Live; Songs for Ships and Irons; All That Glitters Is a Maresnest; A Little Man and a House and the Whole World Window: Special Edition (as 2021 Remaster)	1987
"A Time for Rejoicing"	Tim Smith someone else	Tim Smith; Mark Cawthra; Jim Smith	Toy World	1981
"To Go Off and Things"	Tim Smith	Mark Cawthra (Note: Tim Smith is credited as the sole writer of "To Go Off and Things" on The Seaside (as lyrics for the album are only credited in the Cardiacs Book) and Rude Bootleg. Cardiacs Live, Maresnest and Sampler don't distinguish between music and lyric writers.)	The Obvious Identity; The Seaside; Seaside Treats; Rude Bootleg; Cardiacs Live; All That Glitters Is a Maresnest; Sampler; The Special Garage Concerts	1980
"Two Bites of Cherry"	Tim Smith		On Land and in the Sea; All That Glitters Is a Mares Nest; Sampler	1989
"Vermin Mangle"	Tim Smith		"Vermin Mangle"	2020
"Victory Egg" (Note: Titled "Victory" on original 1988 releases)	Tim Smith		A Little Man and a House and the Whole World Window; Greatest Hits	1988
"Visiting Hours"	Tim Smith		The Obvious Identity; All That Glitters Is a Maresnest (as "Visiting"); All That Glitters Is a Mares Nest; The Special Garage Concerts; Some Fairytales from the Rotten Shed	1980
"Volob"	Tim Smith	Tim Smith; Suzy Kirby	"Volob"; LSD	2025
"What Paradise Is Like"	Tim Smith		"Manhoo"	1995
"The Whole World Window"	Tim Smith; William D. Drake		Rude Bootleg; A Little Man and a House and the Whole World Window	1986
"Will Bleed Amen"	Tim Smith		Guns	1999
"Wind and Rains Is Cold"	Tim Smith		Guns; Greatest Hits	1999
"Wireless"	Tim Smith (Note: "Wireless" contains the story "Peril on the Sea" by Dawn Staple.)		Sing to God; Cardiacs and Affectionate Friends	1996
"Woodeneye"	Tim Smith		"Woodeneye"; LSD	2025
"A Wooden Fish on Wheels"	Tim Smith	Tim Smith; Mark Cawthra	The Seaside; The Special Garage Concerts	1984
