= Cardiacs discography =

Band discography

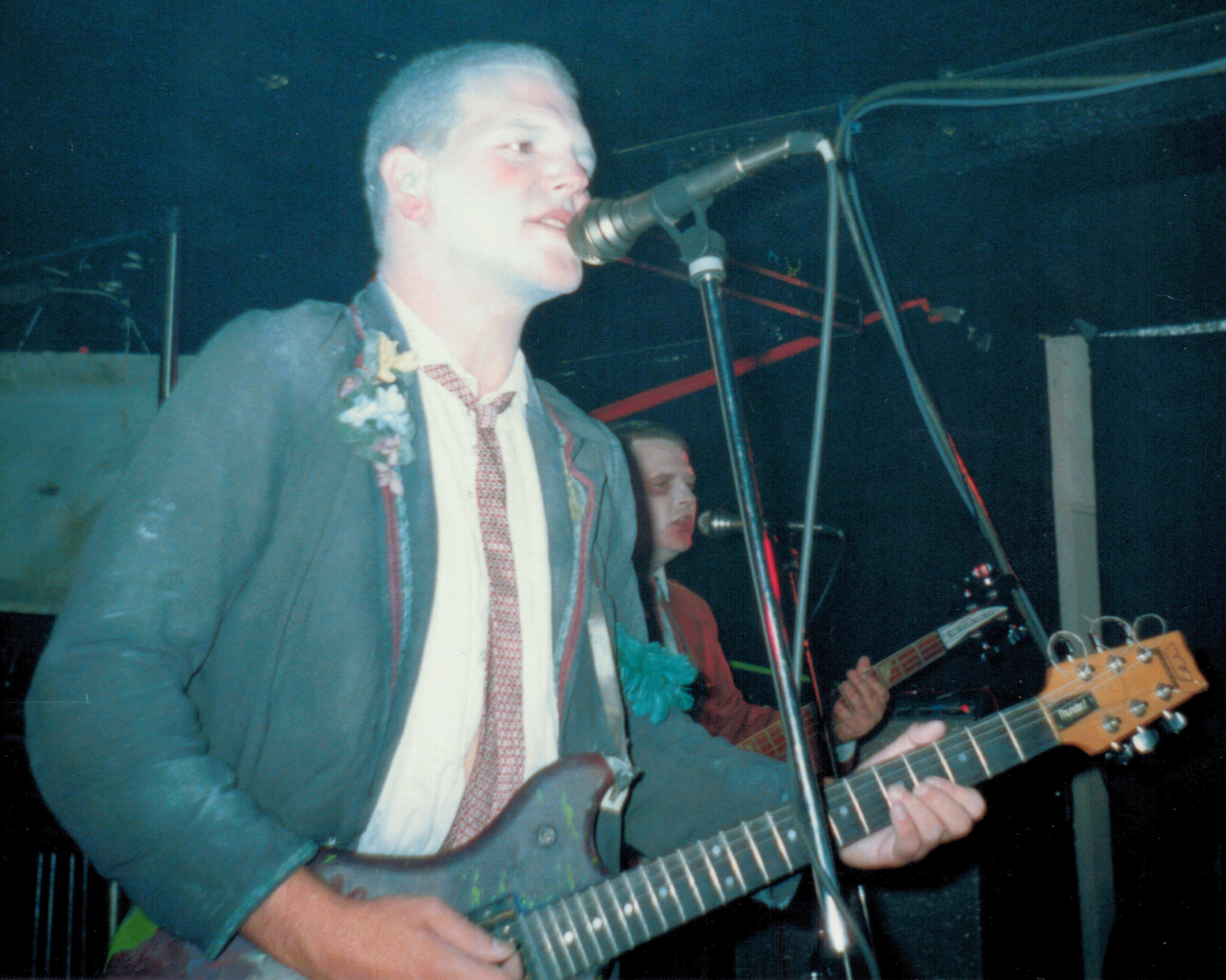
- Cardiacs performing in Amsterdam in 1987
- Studio albums: 6
- Demo albums: 3
- Live albums: 4
- Compilation albums: 5
- Video albums: 3
- EPs and singles: 19

The English rock band Cardiacs have released six studio albums along with a number of extended plays, singles, compilations, live albums and demos. The group was formed by brothers Tim and Jim Smith in 1977 under the name Cardiac Arrest, releasing their debut single "A Bus for a Bus on the Bus" in 1979 and the demo album The Obvious Identity the following year. After being renamed to Cardiacs, the band released two more cassettes, Toy World (1981) and The Seaside (1984).

1987's Big Ship EP acted as Cardiacs' first proper recording, released on their independent label The Alphabet Business Concern on which they would release all future albums. Their debut studio album proper, A Little Man and a House and the Whole World Window (1988) found commercial success with its single, "Is This the Life" which peaked at number 80 on the UK Singles Chart. The band's second studio album, On Land and in the Sea (1989), released to weak sales in comparison to its predecessor, but was critically praised.

Cardiacs' third studio album, Heaven Born and Ever Bright, was released on 15 May 1992. Due to Rough Trade's bankruptcy, the album was a commercial failure. Sing to God, the band's fourth studio album, was released on 11 June 1996. It was initially poorly received, but has since been remembered as one of their greatest projects.

Guns (1999) was released as the band's fifth studio album which produced the single "Signs". Preceded by the release of "Ditzy Scene", the band's sixth studio album LSD remained unreleased until 2025. 2020 saw the official release of the song "Vermin Mangle" to mark the funeral of Tim Smith.

== Albums ==
=== Studio albums ===
Title	Album details	Peak chart positions									Ref.
Title	Album details	UK Sales	UK Down.	UK Phys.	UK Vinyl	UK Rec.	UK Prog.	UK Indie	UK Indie Brk.	SCO	Ref.
A Little Man and a House and the Whole World Window	Released: 21 March 1988; Label: Alphabet/Torso; Format: LP, CD, MC	—	—	—	—	—	—	—	—	—	
On Land and in the Sea	Released: 2 May 1989; Label: Alphabet/Torso; Format: LP, CD, MC	—	—	—	—	—	20	—	17	—	
Heaven Born and Ever Bright	Released: 15 May 1992; Label: Alphabet; Format: LP, CD, MC	65	—	60	38	10	—	14	6	—	
Sing to God	Released: 11 June 1996; Label: Alphabet; Format: 2×CD	—	—	—	—	—	—	—	—	—	
Guns	Released: 21 June 1999; Label: Alphabet; Format: CD	—	—	—	—	—	—	—	—	—	
LSD	Released: 19 September 2025; Label: Alphabet; Format: 2×LP, 2×CD, DL	22	8	36	—	20	5	7	2	81	
"—" denotes a recording that has not charted.

=== Demo albums ===
Title	Album details	Notes
The Obvious Identity (as Cardiac Arrest)	Released: June 1980; Label: self-released; Format: MC	Approximately 100 copies were produced; Three tracks appeared on 1989's Archive Cardiacs
Toy World	Released: March 1981; Label: self-released; Format: MC	Some tracks were recorded in June 1980 during The Obvious Identity sessions
The Seaside	Released: 1984; Label: Alphabet; Format: MC	Remastered and reissued on LP, CD and cassette in 1995 excluding four tracks (Note: The Seaside (1990 reissue) (album liner notes). Cardiacs. Alphabet Business Concern. 1990. ALPH 013.); Released as part of The Seaside: Original Edition boxset in 2015

=== Live albums ===
Title	Album details	Notes
Rude Bootleg	Released: 24 August 1986; Label: Alphabet; Format: LP, CD, MC	Documents the band's 1986 Reading performance, featuring tracks from 1988's A Little Man and a House and the Whole World Window
Cardiacs Live	Released: 31 October 1988; Label: Alphabet; Format: LP, CD	Recorded at the Paradiso in Amsterdam on 15 May 1988 (Note: Cardiacs Live (album liner notes). Cardiacs. Alphabet Business Concern. 1988. ALPH LP010.); Back cover photo was taken at the Town and Country Club in London (Note: Cardiacs Live (album liner notes). Cardiacs. Alphabet Business Concern. 1988. ALPH LP010.)
All That Glitters Is a Mares Nest	Released: 1 June 1995; Label: Alphabet; Format: CD	Recorded at the Salisbury Arts Centre in Salisbury on 30 June 1990 (Note: All That Glitters Is a Mares Nest (CD liner notes). Cardiacs. Alphabet Business Concern. 1995. ALPH CD018.); Originally released as a video in 1990 (Note: All That Glitters Is a Maresnest (VHS liner notes). Cardiacs. Fotodisk. 1990. LFV 116.)
The Special Garage Concerts	Released: 24 September 2005; Label: Alphabet; Format: 2×CD	Recorded at the Garage in London in Autumn 2003 (Note: The Special Garage Concerts (CD liner notes). Cardiacs. Alphabet Business Concern. 2005. ALPH DCD031.); Two volumes originally released separately

=== Compilation albums ===
Title	Album details	Notes
Archive Cardiacs	Released: 1989; Label: Alphabet; Format: MC	A compilation of early Cardiacs demos and previously unreleased instrumentals; Reissued on CD in 1995 and on vinyl in 2018 (Note: Archive Cardiacs (1995 reissue) (CD liner notes). Cardiacs. Alphabet Business Concern. 1995. ALPH CD000.) (Note: Cardiacs Live (album liner notes). Cardiacs. Alphabet Business Concern. 1988. ALPH LP010.)
Songs for Ships and Irons	Released: 16 September 1991; Label: Alphabet; Format: LP, CD, MC	Comprising 1987's Big Ship EP and other non-album tracks
Sampler	Released: 1995; Label: Alphabet; Format: CD	Limited release sampler containing a guide to the Cardiacs discography (Note: Sampler (CD liner notes). Cardiacs. Alphabet Business Concern. 1995. ALPH CD019.)
Cardiacs and Affectionate Friends (with various artists)	Released: 19 May 2001; Label: Org Records/All My Eye and Betty Martin Music; Format: CD	Consists of songs by Cardiacs, side projects and past band members
Greatest Hits	Released: 2 April 2002; Label: Alphabet; Format: CD	Features the exclusive track "Faster Than Snakes with a Ball and a Chain"

=== Video albums ===
Title	Album details	Notes
Seaside Treats	Released: 31 December 1984; Label: Jettisoundz/Alphabet; Format: VHS	Featuring alternative comedy sketches by the band and three music videos
All That Glitters Is a Maresnest	Released: 1992; Label: Fotodisk; Format: VHS	Released on DVD by the Alphabet Business Concern in 2013 (Note: All That Glitters Is a Maresnest (DVD liner notes). Cardiacs. Alphabet Business Concern. 2013. ALPH DVD 001.)
Some Fairytales From the Rotten Shed	Released: 7 September 2017; Label: Alphabet; Format: DVD	Composed of 2003 rehearsal footage of the band's pre-1984 material; Clips uploaded to YouTube preceding full release

== EPs and singles ==
Title	Release details	Description	Peak chart positions			Album	Ref.
Title	Release details	Description	UK	UK Sales	UK Down.	Album	Ref.
Cardiac Arrest E.P. (or the "A Bus for a Bus on the Bus" single)	Released: 1979; Label: Torch; Format: 7-inch single	Single; EP	—	—	—	None	
Seaside Treats	Released: 1985; Label: Alphabet; Format: 12-inch		—	—	—	The Seaside	
Big Ship	Released: 27 January 1987; Label: Alphabet; Format: 12-inch	Single; EP; Mini-album	—	—	—	None originally; later included on Songs for Ships and Irons	
"There's Too Many Irons in the Fire"	Released: 12 August 1987; Label: Alphabet; Format: 12-inch	Single; EP	—	—	—	None originally; later included on Songs for Ships and Irons	
Radio 1 Sessions / The Evening Show	Released: 1988; Label: Strange Fruit/Nighttracks; Format: 12-inch		—	—	—	None	
"Is This the Life"	Released: 1988; Label: Alphabet/Torso; Format: 7-inch, 12-inch		80	—	—	A Little Man and a House and the Whole World Window	
"Susannah's Still Alive"	Released: 5 September 1988; Label: Alphabet; Format: 7-inch, 12-inch		—	—	—	None; B-sides included on Songs for Ships and Irons	
"Baby Heart Dirt"	Released: 10 April 1989; Label: Alphabet/Torso; Format: 7-inch, 12-inch		—	—	—	On Land and in the Sea	
"Day Is Gone"	Released: 28 October 1991; Label: Alphabet; Format: 12-inch, CD		—	—	—	Heaven Born and Ever Bright	
"Bellyeye"	Released: 1995; Label: Org; Format: CD		—	—	—	Sing to God	
"Manhoo"	Released: 1996; Label: Alphabet; Format: CD		—	—	—	Sing to God	
"Odd Even"	Released: 1996; Label: Alphabet; Format: CD		—	—	—	Sing to God	
Cardiacs Meet Camp Blackfoot (or the "Sleep All Eyes Open" single)	Released: 1999; Label: Org; Format: CD		—	—	—	Guns	
"Signs"	Released: 2 August 1999; Label: Alphabet; Format: CD		—	—	—	Guns	
"Ditzy Scene"	Released: 5 November 2007; Label: Org; Format: CD		—	—	—	LSD (tracks reworked)	
"Vermin Mangle"	Released: 1 September 2020; Label: Alphabet; Format: DL		—	—	—	None	
Cardiacs E.P.	Released: 3 January 2025; Label: Melodic Virtue; Format: 7-inch, DL		—	71	67	None	
"Woodeneye"	Released: 1 August 2025; Label: Alphabet; Format: DL		—	56	54	LSD	
"Downup"	Released: 29 August 2025; Label: Alphabet; Format: DL		—	—	—	LSD	
"Volob"	Released: 17 September 2025; Label: Alphabet; Format: DL		—	—	—	LSD	
"—" denotes a recording that has not charted.

== Music videos ==
Title	Director	Album	Ref.
"A Little Man and a House"	Tim Smith	The Seaside and Seaside Treats	
"R.E.S."	Tim Smith	The Seaside and Seaside Treats	
"To Go Off and Things"	Tim Smith	The Seaside and Seaside Treats	
"Tarred and Feathered"		Big Ship	
"Is This the Life"	Stephen Graham	A Little Man and a House and the Whole World Window	
"Susannah's Still Alive"	Steve Payne	None	
"Baby Heart Dirt"		On Land and in the Sea	
"Day Is Gone"		Heaven Born and Ever Bright	
"There's Too Many Irons in the Fire"		Songs for Ships and Irons comp	
"All His Geese Are Swans"		Songs for Ships and Irons comp	
