= Sampler (Cardiacs album) =

Compilation album by Cardiacs
- Released: 1995
- Label: Alphabet Business Concern

Cardiacs chronology
All That Glitters Is a Mares Nest (1995)	Sampler (1995)	Sing to God (1996)

Professional ratings
Review scores
Source	Rating
Encyclopedia of Popular Music	3/5 stars

Sampler is a compilation album by English rock band Cardiacs, released in 1995 by the Alphabet Business Concern.

The album was intended as a budget introduction to the band's music, and was released as part of the general 1995 reissue of the Cardiacs back catalogue. Each track is taken from a different album in the reissue series.

== Track listing ==
All tracks are written by Tim Smith, except where noted.

No.	Title	Writer(s)	From	Length
1.	"Is This the Life"		A Little Man and a House and the Whole World Window	5:36
2.	"Angleworm the Angel"	Jon Poole	The Forthcoming Cardiacs Album Which Isn't Finished Yet & Hasn't Got a Title Either	2:24
3.	"Burn Your House Brown"		Songs for Ships and Irons	2:37
4.	"Goodbye Grace"		Heaven Born and Ever Bright	3:36
5.	"Piffol Four Times"		Archive Cardiacs	2:34
6.	"Two Bites of Cherry" (live)		All That Glitters Is a Mares Nest	3:40
7.	"Tarred and Feathered" (live)	William D. Drake; Smith	Rude Bootleg	2:57
8.	"Blind in Safety and Leafy in Love"		Songs for Ships and Irons	2:43
9.	"Big Ship" (live)		Cardiacs Live	5:53
10.	"Veronica in Ecstacy"		Tim Smiths Extra Special Oceanland World	4:21
11.	"Christ Alive"		The Sea Nymphs	3:13
12.	"The Everso Closely Guarded Line"	Drake; Smith	On Land and in the Sea	8:10
13.	"To Go Off and Things"	Smith; Mark Cawthra	The Seaside	2:13

Notes

- "Angleworm the Angel" was later released on Sing to God (1996) with the title "Angleworm Angel".
