= Greatest Hits (Cardiacs album) =

2002 compilation album by Cardiacs

Greatest hits album by Cardiacs
- Released: 22 February 2002
- Recorded: 1985–2001
- Length: 57:15
- Label: Alphabet Business Concern
- Producer: Tim Smith

Cardiacs chronology
Cardiacs and Affectionate Friends (2001)	Greatest Hits (2002)	The Special Garage Concerts (2005)

Greatest Hits (or Cardiacs Greatest Hits) is a compilation album by the English rock band Cardiacs, released on 22 February 2002.

The album is amusingly titled as it lacks many better-known songs including their biggest hit "Is This the Life".

Greatest Hits features one new and otherwise unavailable track, called "Faster than Snakes with a Ball and a Chain". This is described as having been taken from the then-forthcoming and as-yet untitled album that was to follow Greatest Hits, the creation of which has evidently been abandoned by the band (not to be mistaken for LSD, a later album completed by different personnel.)

== Release ==
On 22 February 2002, the Alphabet Business Concern released Greatest Hits through CD, distributed by Plastic Head Distribution (PHD). The Cardiacs website announced its release on 2 April.

== Critical reception ==
In a retrospective review of On Land and in the Sea (1989), Nick Reed of The Quietus highlighted the Greatest Hits track "Faster than Snakes with a Ball and a Chain" as "excellent".

== Track listing ==
All tracks are written by Tim Smith, except where noted.

No.	Title	From the album	Length
1.	"There's Good Cud"	Guns 1999	2:22
2.	"Manhoo" (Jon Poole)	Sing to God (part one) 1995	3:22
3.	"Buds and Spawn"	On Land and in the Sea 1989	6:40
4.	"Core"	Heaven Born and Ever Bright 1991	2:32
5.	"Fairy Mary Mag"	Sing to God (part one) 1995	3:09
6.	"Odd Even"	Sing to God (part two) 1995	3:18
7.	"She Is Hiding Behind the Shed"	Heaven Born and Ever Bright 1991	4:09
8.	"The Breakfast Line"	A Little Man and a House and the Whole World Window 1988	4:55
9.	"Mares Nest" (William D. Drake, Smith)	On Land and in the Sea 1989	4:16
10.	"Wind and Rains Is Cold"	Guns 1999	3:20
11.	"Faster than Snakes with a Ball and a Chain"	The forthcoming album with no title yet 2001	5:54
12.	"Victory Egg"	A Little Man and a House and the Whole World Window 1988	3:04
13.	"Dirty Boy"	Sing to God (part two) 1995	8:56
14.	"Plane Plane Against the Grain"	Songs for Ships and Irons 1988	1:18
Total length:			57:15

== Personnel ==
Credits adapted from the liner notes of Greatest Hits.

The people who are in...or have once been in Cardiacs

- Tim Smith
- Jim Smith
- Jon Poole
- Bob Leith
- Sarah Smith
- William D. Drake
- Tim Quy
- Dominic Luckman
- Christian Hayes
- Mark Cawthra
- Michael Pugh
- Margurite Jonston
- Peter Tagg
- Colvin Mayers
- Ralf Cade
- Mr. Hiles
- Graham Simmonds
- The Consultant
- Miss Swift

Photographers

- Val Langmuir
- Caroline and Lucy Cook
- Steve Payne
- Matt Anker
- David Oliver
- Marc Palmer
- Simone Buddemeijer
- Steve Randall
- Dominic Search
- Robin Francella
- Des Berkensure
- Loads more
