= The Special Garage Concerts =

2005 live album by Cardiacs

Live album by Cardiacs
- Released: 2005 (Note: Sources conflict on the release date. A post on the Cardiacs website stated that CDs would be available from 17 October 2005, the second year anniversary of the first of the three concerts. However, later streaming releases list the release date 24 September 2005.)
- Recorded: 17–19 October 2003
- Venue: The Garage (London)
- Length: 121:56 (in total); 61:22 (Vol. 1); 60:34 (Vol. 2)
- Label: Alphabet Business Concern

Cardiacs chronology
Greatest Hits (2002)	The Special Garage Concerts (2005)	LSD (2025)

The Special Garage Concerts (Note: Original CD releases feature the longer title The Special Garage Concerts London Autumn 2003, as well as the back cover of the double CD.) is a live double album by English rock band Cardiacs released in 2005. It was recorded at The Garage in London over three nights in October 2003 where the band played most of their material that was recorded before 1984, prior to A Little Man and a House and the Whole World Window. This included many tracks that feature on The Seaside and Archive Cardiacs, and the shows drew heavily from the demos The Obvious Identity and Toy World while also including the previously unreleased tracks "An Ant", "Hello Mr Minnow", "Hopeless" and "Gloomy News" .

The album was the band's first release with guitarist Kavus Torabi, who replaced Jon Poole, and received praise for its live renditions. A recording of the band rehearsing for the shows was released as the 2017 DVD Some Fairytales from the Rotten Shed, which features surrealist comedy and was well-received for its sound quality and theatricality.

== Background and recording ==
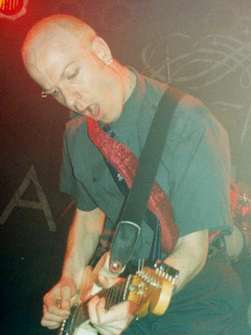
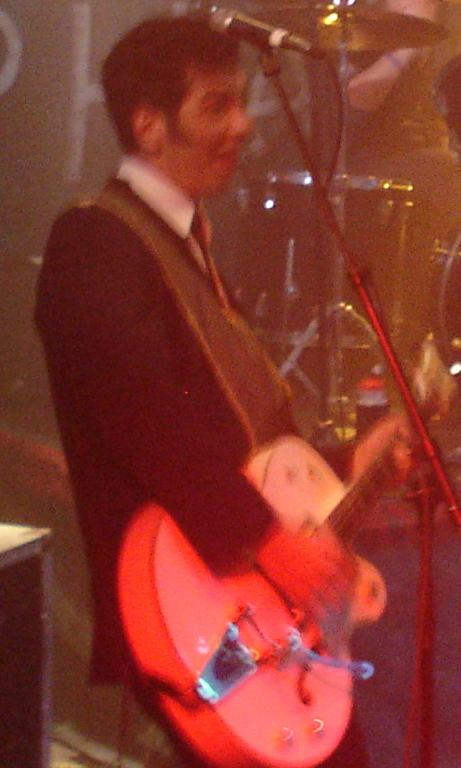
The three shows marked the replacement of Jon Poole (left, 1999) with Kavus Torabi (right, 2005)

Tim Smith hadn't felt comfortable making Cardiacs's early cassette albums public due to their rough sound, but due to the demand for the unavailable songs, the band made the decision to play and record the songs to create high quality versions and a unique concert experience. Prior to the shows, guitarist Jon Poole left Cardiacs due to a tight schedule with the Wildhearts. He was replaced by Kavus Torabi, who had been the band's guitar technician since the months before Sing to God (1996), as well as a member of Die Laughing and the Monsoon Bassoon. Shortly after joining the band in 2003, Torabi had to learn a number of songs from the band's early years for three shows at The Garage in London.

The line-up for the three shows was a four-piece of Tim Smith, Kavus Torabi, Jim Smith, and Bob Leith, with horns and keyboards provided through backing tracks. Though Smith brothers were the only members who had been present since the 1980s, the shows focused on period material, drawing heavily from the demos The Obvious Identity and Toy World and also including some previously unreleased tracks from that time period. Many of the tracks feature on The Seaside and Archive Cardiacs.

Torabi called learning the songs an interesting experience which had him find out a lot about himself. He compared the process to revising for an exam, and recalled that he forgot how to play roughly half of the pieces two weeks after the concerts. Tim Smith gave Torabi and Leith, who weren't around in the early days, a free rein to do what they wanted with the songs. The album was recorded over the three nights at The Garage in the autumn of 2003. Mike Quayle is credited for recording the album using the "SallyBirthdayHouse mobile recording unit", and James Larcombe for mastering it at Securisound.

== Songs ==
The Special Garage Concerts album consists of the best takes capturing the three-night stand at The Garage: 35 songs recorded before 1984. It revamps nearly all of Cardiacs' material prior to A Little Man and a House and the Whole World Window (1988). Benac called the live performances of "Rock Around the Clock", "Dead Mouse", and particularly "Pilf", highlights of the album. The songs "An Ant", "Hello Mr Minnow", "Hopeless" and "Gloomy News" were audience favourites that had never been released. Before playing "An Ant", Tim has moments of fun interacting with Poole, who was in the audience that night.

Mike Vennart, writing for Prog in 2015, named "Let Alone My Plastic Doll" "an early example of Cardiacs’ more dramatic, epic moments; a style they’d eventually master to full effect with 'Dirty Boy'". The live version drones on further than on The Obvious Identity, stretching out the psychedelic feel that Tim produced with sustained notes and distortion. The Garage Concerts version of "A Game for Bertie's Party" is partially sung by drummer Bob Leith in what Venart described as "a deranged, most-likely drunk and haunting manner, giving way to more changeable prog runs and whimsical ska, punk sections sung by Tim". Benac noted how the version came across particularly harshly.

== Release ==
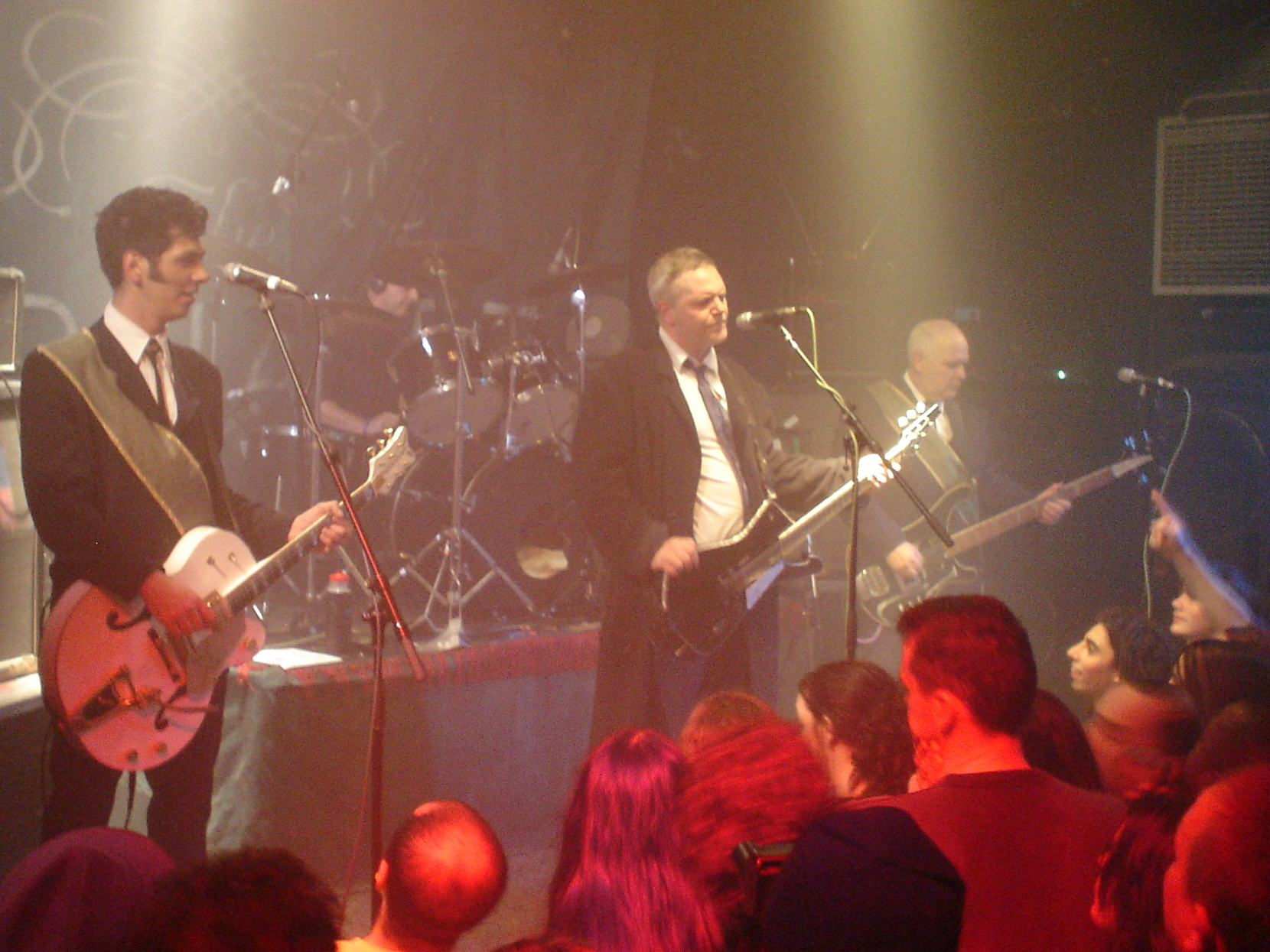
Cardiacs reprising the Garage concerts set at the Bull and Gate in December 2005

The two volumes were originally released separately on CD in 2005, and collected in a single edition in 2014, under the title The Special Garage Concerts.

=== Critical reception ===
Reviewing the concerts in Perfect Sound Forever, Martijn Voorvelt denied that it was "a regressive or dated event", writing that "the songs were injected with new life and meaning" and commending the encore performance of "Dirty Boy" from Sing to God (1996). In his list of the 10 best Cardiacs songs for Prog in 2015, Vennart, a decade before becoming Cardiacs' lead singer, included the album's live renditions of "Let Alone My Platic Doll" and "A Game for Bertie's Party" for its "otherworldly aura". Lawson called The Special Garage Concerts a "sonically dazzling live set" and "Cardiacs' last grand gesture as a live band", calling it essential listening for Cardiacs completists. Benac called the album Torabi's most significant contribution to the band's history, with his guitar and arrangement skills having added a psychedelic edge to the band.

== Track listing ==
=== Volume 1 ===
All tracks are written by Tim Smith, except where noted.

No.	Title	Length
1.	"Gibber and Twitch"	4:12
2.	"Scratching Crawling Scrawling"	1:03
3.	"As Cold as Can Be in an English Sea"	7:03
4.	"It's a Lovely Day" (T. Smith, Mark Cawthra, Colvin Mayers, Sarah Smith)	3:16
5.	"A Wooden Fish on Wheels"	3:08
6.	"Ice a Spot and a Dot on the Dog"	3:36
7.	"Aukamakic"	1:24
8.	"Gloomy News"	2:01
9.	"Gina Lollabridgida"	3:33
10.	"Leaf Scrapings"	1:21
11.	"Rock Around the Clock" (Mayers)	2:03
12.	"Pip As Uncle Dick but Peter Spoiled It" (words by Cawthra)	4:21
13.	"Let Alone My Plastic Doll"	4:23
14.	"Hope Day"	6:29
15.	"A Balloon for Bertie's Party"	8:56
16.	"My Trade Mark"	4:33
Total length:		61:22

=== Volume 2 ===
No.	Title	Length
1.	"The Obvious Identity"	2:33
2.	"Hello Mr Sparrow" (T. Smith, S. Smith)	4:30
3.	"A Bus for a Bus on the Bus"	3:55
4.	"Dinnertime Is at Home (Not Here)"	5:18
5.	"Pilf"	3:51
6.	"An Ant" (words by an actual Ant)	1:49
7.	"Hello Mr Minnow"	4:44
8.	"A Cake for Bertie's Party" (words by Mick Pugh)	3:10
9.	"Food on the Wall"	1:14
10.	"Hopeless" (Cawthra)	2:46
11.	"Dead Mouse"	4:04
12.	"To Go Off and Things" (words by Cawthra)	2:14
13.	"Visiting Hours"	4:57
14.	"RES"	6:08
15.	"A Game for Bertie's Party" (T. Smith, Cawthra)	6:44
16.	"Icky Qualms"	2:57
Total length:		60:34

== Personnel ==
Credits adapted from the liner notes of The Special Garage Concerts.

- Jim Smith – bass, vocals
- Tim Smith – guitar, main vocals
- Kavus Torabi – guitar, vocals
- Bob Leith – drums, vocal (Vol. 2)

Production

- Mike Quayle – recording
- James Larcombe – mastering

== Some Fairytales from the Rotten Shed ==
Some Fairytales from the Rotten Shed
- DVD cover
- Directed by: Tim Smith
- Produced by: Tim Smith
- Edited by: Tim Smith; Paul Morricone
- Music by: Cardiacs
- Production company: Alphabet Business Concern
- Distributed by: The Consultant's Memorabilia Collection
- Release date: 7 September 2017
- Language: English

A recording of the preparation sessions for the 2003 concerts held in the band's shabby rehearsal space was released in 2017 as Some Fairytales from the Rotten Shed. Filmed just prior to The Special Garage Concerts of 2003, it shows the band rehearsing for the show, playing and practising 15 of the show's 35 tracks, crammed into the tiny shack and constantly getting in each other's way. Benac noted that the bickering is likely staged or improvised to play into the band's mythology.

The moments Benac highlighted were Jim playing in his underwear while fighting for space against one of Leith's cymbals not in use, and Jim nailing soundproof padding with his microphone, causing Tim to storm off. Jim had first been made to wait outside in the rain; in one scene, a stoically deadpan Jim tries to put his lead back into his guitar with fuzzy crackles.

Clips of the footage surfaced online years before the complete footage was made available for the first time in 2017. The film received a cinema world premier in September 2018 as part of the prestigious Raindance Film Festival. Record Collector's Alun Hamnett noted the "excellent sound" of the DVD, the "surrealist vein running through the footage", and the pronounced psych, punk and prog influences throughout the earlier material, with "vocal harmonies that recall early Pink Floyd" on "hopeless" and "Icky Qualms" being "stuffed full of riotous energy". Chris Cope of Prog called the DVD "part musical genius, part oddball comedy" and said that it showcased the "now-dormant band’s penchant for prog-punk peculiarity [...] in fine form". He noted the "true sense of theatrical performance" and called Tim Smith an "absorbing presence" on several tracks musically and " also in his snarling looks and grumped-up, off-the-cuff snaps".

=== Track listing ===
All tracks are written by Tim Smith, except where noted.

1. "Gibber and Twitch"
2. "An Ant"
3. "Hopeless" (Mark Cawthra)
4. "As Cold As Can Be in an English Sea"
5. "A Bus for a Bus on the Bus"
6. "Icky Qualms"
7. "Scratching Crawling Scrawling"
8. "Rock Around the Clock" (Colvin Mayers)
9. "Pip As Uncle Dick but Peter Spoiled It" (T. Smith, Cawthra)
10. "A Cake for Bertie's Party" (T. Smith, Mick Pugh)
11. "Hello Mr Sparrow" (Sarah Smith, T. Smith)
12. "Hello Mr Minnow"
13. "Visiting Hours"
14. "Aukamakic"
15. "My Trade Mark"

=== Personnel ===
Credits adapted from the liner notes of Some Fairytales from the Rotten Shed.

- Bob Leith – drums, vocals
- Tim Smith – guitar, lead vocals
- Jim Smith – bass, vocals
- Kavus Torabi – guitar, vocals

Production

- Tim Smith – producer, editor
- Paul Morricone – editor
- Thunder and Lightning Films – mastering
- Michael Chapman – artwork
