= On Land and in the Sea =

Studio album by Cardiacs
- Released: 2 May 1989
- Recorded: 1988–1989
- Studios: The Slaughterhouse, Yorkshire
- Genres: Art rock; pop
- Length: 48:39; 47:19 (LP) (Note: "Horsehead" is not present on the LP release.)
- Label: Alphabet Business Concern/Torso
- Producer: Tim Smith

Cardiacs chronology
Archive Cardiacs (1989)	On Land and in the Sea (1989)	Songs for Ships and Irons (1991)

Singles from On Land and in the Sea
- 1. "Baby Heart Dirt" Released: 10 April 1989

On Land and in the Sea is the second studio album proper (Note: Before their first "official" album A Little Man and a House and the Whole World Window (1988), Cardiacs had already released three cassette-only albums for limited release between 1980 and 1984 and the mini-album Big Ship (1987).) by the English rock band Cardiacs. Produced by band leader Tim Smith, it was recorded and mixed in 1988 at The Slaughterhouse studios in Yorkshire and released in May 1989 by the band's label Alphabet Business Concern. The record features a complex sound, with songs moving through rapid shifts in tempo and key, as well as more experimentation with song structures than the group's previous album. Critics have described the record as art rock and pop in style. It was their final album with their "classic" six-piece line-up.

Promoted by the single "Baby Heart Dirt", On Land and in the Sea received mixed reviews from music critics, although attracted more favourable notices than the group's previous work. Many Cardiacs fans consider it the band's best album. The album was re-released in 1995 and 2007 after the album fell out-of-print.

== Recording and composition ==
Momentum for On Land and in the Sea, Cardiacs' fifth album and second widely distributed release, was built by the mild success of the group's previous album, A Little Man and a House and the Whole World Window (1988), and its single "Is This the Life?", which was the group's only appearance on the UK Singles Chart, reaching number 80. The album was recorded and mixed at The Slaughterhouse, Yorkshire, between Summer and Autumn 1988, except "Horse Head" and "The Safety Bowl", which the liner notes describe as being recorded "in the hand" and "in the bush" respectively. It was the group's final album with the "classic" six-piece line-up, as William D. Drake, Tim Quy and Sarah Smith left the group after its release, leaving drummer Dominic Luckman with Tim Smith, the group's guitarist, vocalist and leader, and Jim Smith. Drake later said of the sessions: "I was in the studio the whole time and got to see how Tim was working. It was just great fun, lots of exploring and experimenting." The record was produced by Tim Smith and engineered by Graham Simmonds and Roger Tebbutt.

The album disregards typical musical elements, such as constant tempos, a regular 4/4 time signature and definable keys, in favour of a chaotic art rock approach, although each song keeps a coherent structure. According to writer Nick Reed, "the music is more complex than most of what came out of big-deal prog groups like Yes, Genesis, and King Crimson, but it certainly doesn't feel that way on the surface. Compared to A Little Man, more songs on On Land and in the Sea have shifting tempos and moving parts, and the group experiment more with song structures, with several songs not breaking the two-minute mark while several other songs are longer. Some songs, such as "The Stench of Honey" and "Two Bites of Cherry", feature rapid, unpredictable shifts in tempo and metre and rely on staccato guitar chords as a musical anchor as opposed to drums. "Horsehead" opens with alternating male-female vocals, a psychedelic piano line and whirring beat, a section which lasts less than half a minute. "The Everso Closely Guarded Line", which largely stays in 6/8 time but switches tempo at unexpected points, features an array of instrumentation and sounds including organ, strings, synthesiser, a xylophone-like percussive instrument and a baby's cry. The album's lyrics also feature a number of cut-and-paste quotes or paraphrases, including from the work of the nineteenth-century Irish poet George Darley (in the songs "Arnald" and "Mare's Nest").

== Cover art ==
The cover of On the Land and in the Sea features a picture of Cardiacs' current lineup superimposed ontop of an image of a tree, with Jim Smith's face obscured. The back cover jokingly gives The Alphabet Business Concern's reasoning for doing so, stating that Jim had attempted a cock sure expression that they had disapproved of and that he "incidentally had neither the poise nor bearing required to carry this off successfully".

== Release ==
The release of On the Land and in the Sea was announced in the Cardiacs newsletter. The album was released by the band's own label Alphabet Business Concern (ABC) on 2 May 1989 on CD, LP and cassette formats, although was able to be pre-ordered from ABC before that date, and was preceded by the single "Baby Heart Dirt" released on 10 April in seven-inch and twelve-inch formats. All releases were distributed by Pinnacle. Cardiacs' newsletter also offered a signed copy of the album to recipients sending "a morally uplifting motto or proverb" in fewer than nine words. Dutch record label Torso released the album on CD with the inclusion of unlisted extra tracks consisting of the album's single mixes. Cardiacs premiered most of the album's songs at a gig in Scunthorpe, having rehearsed intensely for five days. Their subsequent performance at the Salisbury Arts Centre in 1990 was released as the film Maresnest. The band's catalogue had become out-of-print by the mid-1990s, leading ABC to reissue all the group's albums, including On Land and in the Sea, on CD in May 1995. The ABC edition was re-pressed in 2007, and is currently available digitally on the band's Bandcamp page as well as on CD via their official web store.

== Critical reception ==
Professional ratings
Review scores
Source	Rating
AllMusic	2/5 stars
Classic Rock	8/10
Encyclopedia of Popular Music	3/5 stars
Q	4/5 stars
Sounds	4/5 stars
Sputnikmusic	4.0/5
Uncut	9/10; 8/10
The Virgin Encyclopedia of Eighties Music	3/5 stars

On Land and in the Sea received some of the best reviews of Cardiacs' career. Noting the band's previous role as "fruitcake purveyors of irreverent, florid, and pomp-ish pop, both harking back to the early ‘70s and ridiculing that period's excesses," Q's Henry Williams described the album as "a tour-de-force" and "a scary and unanticipated triumph," referring to the music's "manic, cackling pace" and comparing Cardiacs' work to both the Small Faces and Peter Hammill. In Melody Maker, Andrew Smith described it as the first album to capture "the full majesty" of Cardiacs' sound and dubbed it "insanely sharp; one continuous, sweeping, collection of sawn-off epic joy... a deeply satisfying album." He also praised the album's energy and observed "echoes of Broadway musical – in the unapologetic, audacious breadth and scale of their sound – as well as the inscrutably Germanic qualities of a Brecht or Eisler (both of whom would have loved this album). In fact, The Cardiacs are very Brechtian: they never allow the listener to settle into passive receptivity." In Sounds, Cathi Unsworth described Cardiacs as "a sprawling frenzied fiesta, beating out their own inimitable sound with the starkest, most vibrant shades in the palette," and called the album "a veritable masterpiece that stands alone in demented ingenuity."

Retrospectively, Dean Carlson of AllMusic described On Land and in the Sea as a "whirligig of shattered atonal pop" that was uneasy to like, adding that the album was "[g]reat for those who liked staticy hip-hop, piercing keyboards, Long Ranger harmonicas, and the sound of a tape deck being clicked off, less so for those who didn't." In Rock: The Rough Guide, Lance Phillips said the album is revered by fans of Cardiacs to be the group's "outstanding release," but added that it is "weighted too heavily" towards "furious rapid-fire" style songs. William R. of Sputnikmusic described the "excellent and influential" album as a "difficult but rewarding foray into the weird side of art rock." Although he felt that "it feels like sometimes Cardiacs are being avant-garde for the sake of being avant-garde", with songs constantly pursuing "some sort of disorienting tempo change, meter change, weird harmonies or some combination", he considered it an excellent, "mysteriously catchy" album that is "never actually unenjoyable." Nick Reed of The Quietus described the album as an advance on A Little Man and "still as insane and awesome as I remember it - most albums tend to lose a bit of lustre after you play them for months and months on end, but if anything, On Land feels like it's even more than what I remembered."

== Legacy ==
Many Cardiacs fans consider On Land and in the Sea to be one of the band's best works. According to Sean Kitching of The Quietus, fans are split between those who consider On Land and in the Sea the band's best recorded work, and those who consider Sing to God (1996) instead, noting that the choice perhaps depends "on the era of the individual's initial fascination as well as their breadth of preferred musical palette." Future Cardiacs guitarist Kavus Torabi said discovering the album was "like a clarion call to haul my lazy refusenik butt from a twilight existence in the South West of this England all the way over to London and get on board with the rigmarole of making proper far out music." In a list for The Quietus, he named it one of his favourite albums, saying "when this came out I genuinely thought they were going to be the new Beatles," adding that "it's an absolutely perfect album. It exists completely in its own dimension. It's everything you want from music." Fellow future member Jon Poole said that, "as a fan", it's his favourite Cardiacs album, adding that it "[b]rings back great memories of following the band around in a tiny car with [future Cardiacs drummer] Bob Leith." William D. Drake said he aims to pursue "the same level of exploration" in his solo albums that Cardiacs had with A Little Man and On Land and in the Sea.

English musician Alexander Tucker, who discovered On Land and in the Sea aged 14, also named it one of his favourite albums in another list for the website, saying "[t]he world presented in these weird proggy psychedelic songs spoke of a strange grey English landscape of suburban surrealism - of mum and dad, home, birth, death and flowers." He told an interviewer for Concrete Island that he felt close kinship to Tim Smith, whose lyrics on the album he calls "a mixture of the everyday and the complete cut-up Dadaist nonsense." Ginger Wildheart of the Wildhearts told Kerrang!: "Every song of ours that features an extended riff section owes as much to Cardiacs as to early Metallica. And On Land and in the Sea is to Cardiacs what Master of Puppets is to Metallica."

== Track listing ==
All tracks are written by Tim Smith unless otherwise indicated.

No.	Title	Writer(s)	Length
1.	"Two Bites of Cherry"		3:19
2.	"Baby Heart Dirt"		3:32
3.	"The Leader of the Starry Skys"		3:52
4.	"I Hold My Love in My Arms"	William D. Drake; Smith	1:10
5.	"The Duck and Roger the Horse"		3:56
6.	"Arnald"		2:49
7.	"Horsehead"		1:20
8.	"Fast Robert"		3:59
9.	"Mare's Nest"	Drake; Smith	4:15
10.	"The Stench of Honey"		3:33
11.	"Buds and Spawn"		6:46
12.	"The Safety Bowl"		1:45
13.	"The Everso Closely Guarded Line"	Drake; Smith	8:23
Total length:			48:39

== Personnel ==
Adapted from the liner notes of On Land and in the Sea

Cardiacs – all singing, all instruments

- Jim Smith – bass and vocals
- Tim Smith – guitar and lead vocals, producer
- Sarah Smith – saxophones, recorders, clarinets and vocals
- Tim Quy – percussion, synthesizer
- William D. Drake – keyboards and vocals
- Dominic Luckman – drums

Additional personnel

- Roger Tebbutt – engineer
- Graham Simmonds – engineer
- Steve Payne – photography (front cover)
- Tony Stringer – photography (back cover)

== Charts ==
Chart performance for On Land and in the Sea
Chart (2025)	Peak position
UK Independent Albums Breakers (OCC)	17
