= Stoneage Dinosaurs =

1987 song by Cardiacs

Song by Cardiacs

from the EP Big Ship
- Released: 27 January 1987
- Studio: Raven
- Length: 5:22
- Label: Alphabet Business Concern
- Songwriter: Tim Smith
- Producers: Tim Smith; Graham Simmonds

"Stoneage Dinosaurs" is a song by English rock band Cardiacs from their EP Big Ship (1987). The song was written by frontman Tim Smith and produced by Smith alongside Graham Simmonds. Musically, the song is a melancholy track with violins, saxophones and funeral paced drums. Its lyrics reference family, contemporary celebrities and the First World War. The song received generally positive reviews from music critics, who noted its stark difference to the other tracks on the EP.

An unusually relaxed song in the Cardiacs discography, "Stoneage Dinosaurs" was later included on the compilation Songs for Ships and Irons (1991). A cover of the song by Steven Wilson of Porcupine Tree from the tribute album Leader of the Starry Skies: A Tribute to Tim Smith, Songbook 1 (2010) was released as a split single with Oceansize on 16 April 2011 for Record Store Day to raise funds for Smith, after Smith had a heart attack and severe stroke in 2008.

== Background and composition ==
"Stoneage Dinosaurs" was recorded at Raven Studios. It was written by Tim Smith and was produced by Smith and Graham Simmonds. The song appeared on side two of Big Ship, which was released by the Alphabet Business Concern on 27 January 1987. The whole EP was subsequently included on the compilation Songs for Ships and Irons (1991). During a live performance of "Stoneage Dinosaurs", the backing tape slowed down, making the band sound out of tune. To counter this, Cardiacs descended into a thrumming wall of noise to make it appear deliberate. The song features a saxophone solo by Sarah Smith, Tim Smith's wife at the time, which was played note for note on guitar by Jon Poole during concerts in the late 90s.

A melancholy song, "Stoneage Dinosaurs" features "violins, saxophones and funeral paced drums" according to Melody Maker's Mick Mercer. The song's lyrics reference celebrities and television personalities from the time of Smith's childhood, including Michael Miles, Peter Glaze and Liberace, as well as the contemporary Mr T. Smith's brother Jim is also mentioned, being the first time Smith sung about himself and part of his family. The First World War, and war in general, is another lyrical element which appears in the song.

== Reception ==
"Stoneage Dinosaurs" was met with generally positive reviews from music critics. Mercer wrote that "'Stoneage Dinosaurs' sounds like a sixties dollop", describing it as an "impressively restrained operation" but criticised its length. Biographer Adrian Bell described the song as "the most moving record which always leaves a little bit of something in your mind". He recalled its live performance being "a majestic epic that sent us all home with warm hearts and fuzzy tummies" and "the kind of song that brings everybody down to a nice relaxed high after the frenzied activity of all that's gone before." Sarah Smith's saxophone solo has been remembered as one of her standout moments. In The Independent, Paul T Horgan described the song as sounding different from the other tracks on the EP, calling it a "powerful adagio of lament" and "grossly under-appreciated.

== Credits and personnel ==
Credits adapted from Big Ship EP liner notes.

Cardiacs

- Tim Smith – lead vocals, electric guitar
- Jim Smith – electric bass, vocals
- Sarah Smith – saxophones, clarinets, vocals
- William D. Drake – electric and acoustic keyboards, vocals
- Dominic Luckman – drums, vocals
- Tim Quy – marimba, synthesizer, percussion

Production

- Tim Smith – production
- Graham Simmonds – production, audio mixing
- Mark Cawthra – sound engineering

== Steven Wilson version ==
"Stoneage Dinosaurs"

Single by Steven Wilson

from the album Leader of the Starry Skies: A Tribute to Tim Smith, Songbook 1
- B-side: "Fear"
- Released: 16 April 2011
- Studio: No Man's Land (Hertfordshire)
- Length: 4:15
- Label: Kscope

Steven Wilson singles chronology
"Vapour Trail Lullaby" (2010)	"Stoneage Dinosaurs" (2011)	"Postcard" (2011)

Porcupine Tree frontman Steven Wilson contributed a cover of "Stoneage Dinosaurs" to Leader of the Starry Skies: A Tribute to Tim Smith, Songbook 1 (2010), a tribute album covering the songs of Tim Smith. The album was released to raise money for Smith who had a heart attack that triggered a major stroke in June 2008. Wilson recorded the cover at his studio No Man's Land in Hertfordshire. To promote a vinyl reissue of the album, the cover was released as a split single with "Fear" by Oceansize on 16 April 2011 to coincide with Indie Record Store Day by record label Kscope. "Fear" appeared originally on the Spratleys Japs album Pony (1999).

After Smith died in 2020, Wilson wrote a statement on Twitter and uploaded his cover to YouTube as a eulogy, saying he was "deeply saddened" and complimented Smith on his "truly unique [sound] and musical [personality]".

=== Track listing ===
All tracks are written by Tim Smith.

7-inch single
No.	Title	Music	Original release	Length
1.	"Stoneage Dinosaurs" (by Steven Wilson)	Cardiacs	Big Ship	4:15
2.	"Fear" (by Oceansize)	Spratleys Japs	Pony	2:20

== Other cover versions ==
An additional cover of "Stoneage Dinosaurs" was released by the instrumental rock band Gilmore Trail and friends Martin Archer, Ellie Shepherd, Kathy Sparshott and Paul Sparshott on 11 August 2018. The cover was included on the tribute album The Whole World Window II (2018).
