= The Obvious Identity =

Demo album by Cardiac Arrest
- Released: June 1980
- Recorded: June 1980
- Length: 45:18
- Label: Self-released
- Producer: Cardiac Arrest

Cardiac Arrest chronology
Cardiac Arrest E.P. (1979)	The Obvious Identity (1980)	Toy World (1981)

Professional ratings
Review scores
Source	Rating
Encyclopedia of Popular Music	3/5 stars
The Virgin Encyclopedia of Eighties Music	3/5 stars

The Obvious Identity is a self-released album by English rock group Cardiacs, their first album of any sort, released under the group's earlier name of Cardiac Arrest. The album format was cassette tape, and it was only sold at concerts. The album title came from a name which the band used for a short time prior to taking on the Cardiac Arrest name. Two songs featured the band's original lead singer, Michael Pugh. (Pugh's only other appearance with the band on record was on the "A Bus for a Bus on the Bus" single)

The album was recorded at Crow Studios in Kingston upon Thames, Surrey, UK. It was recorded with the punk/DIY ethic in mind as Smith had little cash to invest in the project. The master tapes were duplicated onto as many old cassette tapes as Smith could find. An anonymous member of the band has been quoted as commenting that "the recordings were so shit it wouldn’t matter if they were copied onto washing-up sponges." About 1000 cassettes were produced.

== Reissues and alternative versions of album tracks ==
The Obvious Identity has never been reissued, and is consequently one of the rarest Cardiac Arrest/Cardiacs releases. However, many of the pieces from it have either been reissued on other Cardiacs releases or have had live versions appearing on other albums.

- "Bite 3/a" is the only track from The Obvious Identity that has never been reissued in any form.
- "To Go Off and Things" was re-recorded for the 1984 album The Seaside. As a live favourite, versions of it have appeared on most of the Cardiacs live albums.
- "The Obvious Identity", "Rock Around The Clock" and "A Game For Berties Party" were all included on the 1989 Archive Cardiacs compilation.
- A live version of "Cameras" appeared on the 1988 live album Cardiacs Live.
- A shorter live version of "Visiting Hours" (retitled as "Visiting") appeared on the live album All That Glitters Is a Mares Nest.
- Live versions of "Pip As Uncle Dick But Peter Spoilt It", "Rock Around The Clock", "Let Alone My Plastic Doll", "Leaf Scrapings", and "A Balloon For Berties Party" appeared on the 2005 live album The Special Garage Concerts Vol I.
- Live versions of "The Obvious Identity", "Visiting Hours", "A Game For Berties Party" and "Pilf" appeared on the 2005 live album The Special Garage Concerts Vol II.
- Versions of "Visiting Hours", "Pip As Uncle Dick But Peter Spoilt It" and "Rock Around the Clock" appeared on the 2017 DVD Some Fairytales From The Rotten Shed.

== Track listing ==
All tracks are written by Tim Smith, except where noted.

Side one
No.	Title	Writer(s)	Length
1.	"The Obvious Identity"		2:11
2.	"Visiting Hours"		4:50
3.	"Pip as Uncle Dick but Peter Spoilt It"	Smith^{[a]}^{[b]}; Mark Cawthra^{[b]}	4:35
4.	"To Go Off and Things"	Smith^{[a]}; Cawthra^{[b]}	2:25
5.	"Rock Around the Clock"	Colvin Mayers; Smith	1:53
6.	"Leaf Scrapings"	Smith; Cardiac Arrest	3:13

Side two
No.	Title	Writer(s)	Length
1.	"A Game for Bertie's Party"	Smith^{[a]}^{[b]}; Cawthra^{[a]}^{[b]}	7:02
2.	"Cameras"	Cawthra arr. Smith	1:02
3.	"Bite 3/a"		2:37
4.	"Pilf"		3:22
5.	"Let Alone My Plastic Doll"		4:06
6.	"A Balloon for Bertie's Party"		8:02

Notes

- ^{^a} signifies music by
- ^{^b} signifies words by

== Personnel ==
Adapted from the album's liner notes and according to Eric Benac.

- Peter 'Zip' Boker (Michael Pugh) – vocals (tracks 1, 7)
- Philip Pilf (Tim Smith) – vocals (tracks 2–6, 8–12); guitar, synthesizer, organ, handclaps, glockenspiel
- Patty Pilf (Jim Smith) – bass guitar, vocals, handclaps
- Duncan Doilet (Colvin Mayers) – vocals, synthesizer, strings, organ, handclaps
- Little Bobby Shattocks (Mark Cawthra) – drums, vocals, handclaps

Technical

- Produced by Cardiac Arrest
- Some engineered by Simon most by Peter
