= All That Glitters Is a Mares Nest =

All That Glitters Is a Maresnest
- Original VHS cover

Video / Live album by Cardiacs
- Released: 1992 (Note: The Encyclopedia of Popular Music indicates a release year of 1993.) (video); 1 June 1995 (album)
- Recorded: 30 June 1990
- Venue: Salisbury Arts Centre
- Length: 78:35
- Label: Alphabet Business Concern
- Director: Steve Payne

Cardiacs chronology
Seaside Treats (1985)	All That Glitters Is a Maresnest (1992)	Some Fairytales From the Rotten Shed (2017)

1995 Re-release

Cardiacs chronology
Heaven Born and Ever Bright (1992)	All That Glitters Is a Mares Nest (1995)	Sampler (1995)

Professional ratings
Review scores
Source	Rating
Encyclopedia of Popular Music	3/5 stars

All That Glitters Is a Maresnest (Note: Video title. Also known simply as Maresnest. The album is titled All That Glitters Is a Mares Nest with a space.) is a concert film and live album by the English rock band Cardiacs. It is their third live album, and was originally recorded in the afternoon in the Salisbury Arts Centre on 30 June 1990 with Napalm Death. The album was released on VHS in 1992 and as a live album on 1 June 1995.

Napalm Death were recording their video Live Corruption (1992) at the same venue that evening, and seeing as both Cardiacs and Napalm Death shared the same manager, it was decided they could record two live videos in the same place for the price of one-and-a-half. The CD features two extra tracks ("Two Bites of Cherry" and "All Spectacular") that didn't appear on the video.

All That Glitters Is a Mares Nest is the only Cardiacs album to feature the band as a septet. The lineup of Cardiacs which played this concert did not entirely reflect the live touring band of the time as Sarah Smith had left the band the previous year. The show was Tim Quy's last performance with Cardiacs.

== Video ==
The video was directed by Steve Payne and produced by Steven Malitsky, for Fotodisk.

Maresnest was officially re-released on DVD format on 2 September 2013, with improved video and sound quality.

The last track of the Sea Nymphs' second album On the Dry Land (2016), "Wanky", first appeared in the 'on the tour bus' section of the film.

Future Cardiacs members Jon Poole and Bob "Babba" Leith can be seen in the crowd during some shots.

The film was screened at the Barnes Film Festival on 20 June 2021, followed by an interview with keyboardist William D. Drake hosted by author and journalist Cathi Unsworth.

== Track listing ==
All songs written by Tim Smith unless otherwise indicated.

VHS (1992 release / 2013 DVD release)

1. "The Duck and Roger the Horse"
2. "There's Too Many Irons in the Fire"
3. "It's a Lovely Day" (T. Smith, Sarah Smith, Colvin Mayers, Mark Cawthra)
4. "Everything Is Easy"
5. "I Hold My Love in My Arms" (T. Smith, William D. Drake)
6. "Arnald"
7. "Baby Heart Dirt"
8. "To Go Off and Things" (T. Smith, Cawthra) (followed by unlisted instrumental "Bic's Bit")
9. "The Leader of the Starry Skys"
10. "Tarred and Feathered" (T. Smith, Drake)
11. "Fast Robert"
12. "Big Ship"
13. "Visiting"
14. "R.E.S."
15. "Is This the Life?"

CD (1995 release)
No.	Title	Writer(s)	Length
1.	"The Duck and Roger the Horse"		6:42
2.	"There's Too Many Irons in the Fire"		3:26
3.	"It's a Lovely Day"	Smith, Colvin Mayers, Mark Cawthra	4:51
4.	"Everything Is Easy"		3:57
5.	"Two Bites of Cherry"		4:50
6.	"I Hold My Love in My Arms"	William D. Drake, Smith	1:13
7.	"Arnald"		2:43
8.	"Baby Heart Dirt"		4:05
9.	"All Spectacular"		2:41
10.	"To Go Off and Things" (followed by unlisted instrumental "Bic's Bit")	Smith, Cawthra	8:03
11.	"The Leader of the Starry Skies"		4:34
12.	"Tarred and Feathered"	Drake, Smith	4:32
13.	"Fast Robert"		3:33
14.	"Big Ship"		7:04
15.	"Visiting Hours"		1:49
16.	"R.E.S."		6:46
17.	"Is This The Life"		7:46
Total length:			78:35

== Personnel ==
Adapted from the Maresnest liner notes.

Cardiacs

- Tim Quy – percussion, bass synth (Note: Not credited for bass synth on video releases)
- Tim Smith – lead guitar, vocals
- Jim Smith – bass guitar, vocals
- Sarah Smith – saxophone
- Christian Hayes – guitar, vocals
- William D. Drake – keyboards, vocals (Note: Credit absent on 1995 album release)
- Dominic Luckman – drums

Technical

- Mike Smith – executive producer
- Steve Malitsky – film producer
- Steve Payne – film director
- Cardiacs – sleeve design
