= Rude Bootleg =

Live album by Cardiacs
- Released: 1986
- Recorded: 24 August 1986
- Venue: Reading Festival, Reading
- Genre: Rock
- Length: 38:04
- Label: Alphabet Business Concern

Cardiacs chronology
The Seaside (1984)	Rude Bootleg (1986)	Big Ship (1987)

Professional ratings
Review scores
Source	Rating
Encyclopedia of Popular Music	3/5 stars
The Virgin Encyclopedia of Eighties Music	3/5 stars

Rude Bootleg (subtitled Live at the Reading Festival, 1986) is a live album by the English rock band Cardiacs. It is the band's first live album, and was originally recorded at the Reading Rock Festival on 24 August 1986.

The original source material for Rude Bootleg' was a "very rough and ready" cassette recording taken from the onstage sound mixing desk during Cardiacs' performance. Despite this, the album has excellent sound quality given the circumstances of recording.

Rude Bootleg was originally released as a free cassette, bundled with orders of Cardiacs' 1988 album A Little Man and a House and the Whole World Window: this package was available for a short time as a special value pack. A number of 12" vinyl LP copies were released, all as white-label releases in a plain white sleeve (although some had an A4 white (or pastel blue) paper insert. For these vinyl releases, the only markings were a rubber stamp on the cover, repeated on the centre labels (although some later pressings omitted the cover stamp.

The album was reissued on CD as part of Cardiacs' 1995 reissue programme on Alphabet Business Concern.

== Track listing ==
All songs written and arranged by Tim Smith unless otherwise indicated.

Side A
No.	Title	Writer(s)	Length
1.	"The Icing on the World"		2:41
2.	"To Go Off and Things"	Smith, Mark Cawthra	3:16
3.	"In a City Lining"		6:25
4.	"Tarred and Feathered"	William D. Drake, Smith	3:11
5.	"Big Ship"		5:20

Side B
No.	Title	Writer(s)	Length
1.	"I'm Eating in Bed"	Drake, Smith	5:25
2.	"Is This the Life"		5:48
3.	"The Whole World Window"	Drake, Smith	6:02

== Personnel ==
According to Eric Benac:

- Tim Smith – guitar, vocals
- Jim Smith – bass, vocals
- Sarah Smith – saxophones, vocals
- William D. Drake – keyboards, vocals
- Tim Quy – percussion, vocals
- Dominic Luckman – drums
