= Cardiacs Live =

Live album by Cardiacs
- Released: 31 October 1988
- Recorded: 15 May 1988
- Venue: The Paradiso, Amsterdam
- Genre: Rock
- Length: 51:58
- Label: Alphabet Business Concern

Cardiacs chronology
| A Little Man and a House and the Whole World Window (1988) | Cardiacs Live (1988) | Archive Cardiacs (1989) |

Professional ratings
Review scores
| Source | Rating |
|---|---|
| Encyclopedia of Popular Music | 3/5 stars |
| Sounds | 3 stars |
| The Virgin Encyclopedia of Eighties Music | 3/5 stars |

Cardiacs Live (Note: Longer titles: Cardiacs Live at the Paradiso, Amsterdam; Cardiacs Live: Recorded Live at the Paradiso Amsterdam, Holland) is a live album by Cardiacs, recorded at the Paradiso in Amsterdam on 15 May 1988. The live photo on the back cover, however, appears to have been taken at The Town and Country Club in London.

A bootleg does exist with extra tracks that were unused on the official LP/CD.

== Track listing ==
All tracks are written by Tim Smith, except where noted.

| No. | Title | Writer(s) | Length |
|---|---|---|---|
| 1. | "The Icing on the World" | | 6:12 |
| 2. | "To Go Off and Things" | Smith; Mark Cawthra | 3:10 |
| 3. | "In a City Lining" | | 6:53 |
| 4. | "Gina Lollobrigida" | | 4:02 |
| 5. | "There's Too Many Irons in the Fire" | | 3:13 |
| 6. | "Tarred and Feathered" | Smith; William D. Drake | 4:21 |
| 7. | "Goosegash" | | 2:05 |
| 8. | "Loosefish Scapegrace" | | 7:31 |
| 9. | "Cameras" | Smith; Drake; Cawthra | 2:09 |
| 10. | "Is This the Life" | | 6:11 |
| 11. | "Big Ship" | | 6:11 |
| Total length: | | | 51:58 |

== Personnel ==
Band

- Tim Quy – percussion, synthesizer, bass drum
- Tim Smith – lead vocals, guitar
- Jim Smith – bass guitar, vocals, bass drum
- Sarah Smith – saxophone, vocals, bass drum
- William D. Drake – keyboards, vocals
- Dominic Luckman – drums

Artwork

- Steve Payne – front cover photo of Cardiacs
- David Oliver – front cover of decorative items
- Dominic Search – back cover photo

Crew

- Matthew Cutts
- Dave Mercer
- Dominic Parker
- Bill Hiles
- Graham Simmonds

Management

- Mr. Walmesley – management
- The Consultant – sordid artfulness
- Miss Swift – serenity
- John Daniel – accountancy
