= Toy World =

1981 demo album by Cardiacs

Demo album by Cardiacs
- Released: 1981
- Recorded: June 1980–March 1981
- Studio: Crow (Surrey)
- Length: 42:16
- Label: Private release
- Producer: Cardiacs

Cardiacs chronology
| The Obvious Identity (1980) | Toy World (1981) | The Seaside (1984) |

Professional ratings
Review scores
| Source | Rating |
|---|---|
| Encyclopedia of Popular Music | 3/5 stars |
| The Virgin Encyclopedia of Eighties Music | 3/5 stars |

Toy World is the second demo album by the English rock band Cardiacs (including The Obvious Identity, released on cassette the previous year under the band name "Cardiac Arrest"). The cassette is a mixture of older songs by the earlier Cardiac Arrest lineup and newer songs by the then-current Cardiacs lineup. This was the last album to feature keyboard player/backing singer Colvin Mayers, and the first to feature saxophonist/backing singer/occasional keyboard player Sarah Cutts (who on all future releases would be referred to as Sarah Smith).

As with The Obvious Identity, recording was carried out at Crow Studios in Surbiton, Surrey, UK. The tracks were recorded under very low budget circumstances - one member later recalled "Every time the door bell went or the phone rang, it would put a massive crackle on the tapes," - and the final sound quality was quite flat.

Toy World was only made available on cassette, sold at concerts and from the fan club. The cassette features the earliest versions of the songs "Is This The Life?" and "Nurses Whispering Verses", better known in their re-recorded forms on later albums.

== Reissues and alternate versions of album tracks ==
Toy World has never been reissued, and is consequently one of the rarest Cardiacs releases. However, many of the pieces from it have either been reissued on other Cardiacs releases or have had live versions appearing on other albums.

- "Over (outtake)", "Over + Over + Over + Over", "A Big Noise in a Toy World", "Verses" and "A Time for Rejoicing" have never been reissued in any form. The last three of these tracks will never be re-released as the master tape on which they were recorded is no longer available.
- "Nurses Whispering Verses" was re-recorded for the 1983 album The Seaside (but left off the CD version until the 2015 remaster). A third version was recorded for the 1995 album Sing to God with altered lyrics.
- "Verses" is a section of "Nurses Whispering Verses" played backwards. It has never been reissued, though was sometimes performed live as an intro track when the performance in question ended with "Nurses Whispering Verses".
- "Is This The Life?" was re-recorded for the 1983 album The Seaside (but left off the 1995 CD reissue). A third version was recorded for the 1988 album A Little Man and a House and the Whole World Window.
- "Aukamakic", "Icky Qualms", "SCRATCHING CRAWLING SCRAWLING" and "AS COLD AS CAN BE IN AN ENGLISH SEA" were all included on the 1989 Archive Cardiacs compilation.
- "TRADEMARK" (under the variant title of "My Trademark") was also included on the 1989 Archive Cardiacs compilation.
- Live versions of "Aukamacic", "My Trademark", "Scratching Crawling Scrawling" and "As Cold as Can Be in an English Sea" appeared on the 2005 live album The Special Garage Concerts Vol I.
- Live versions of "Icky Qualms" and "Dead Mouse" appeared on the 2005 live album The Special Garage Concerts Vol II.
- Versions of "Aukamacic", "Icky Qualms", "Trademark" (as "My Trade Mark"), "Scratching Crawling Scrawling" and "As Cold as Can Be in an English Sea" appeared on the 2017 DVD Some Fairytales from the Rotten Shed.
- The track "Dead Mouse" was originally intended for the band's debut release, "A Bus for a Bus on the Bus", as "Keep Your Dead Mice With You", the version on this tape a rerecording. The original recording has never been reissued.

== Track listing ==
All lyrics are written by Tim Smith, Mark Cawthra and Jim Smith; all music is composed by Tim Smith, except where noted.

Side one
| No. | Title | Music | Length |
|---|---|---|---|
| 1. | "Aukamacic" | | 0:52 |
| 2. | "Icky Qualms" | | 2:16 |
| 3. | "Over + Over + Over + Over" | T. Smith; Max Mayers | 5:29 |
| 4. | "Dead Mouse" | | 4:36 |
| 5. | "A Big Noise in a Toy World" | T. Smith; Cawthra | 3:55 |
| 6. | "Trademark" | | 3:41 |

Side two
| No. | Title | Length |
|---|---|---|
| 1. | "Scratching Crawling Scrawling" | 0:57 |
| 2. | "As Cold as Can Be in an English Sea" | 7:13 |
| 3. | "Is This the Life?" | 5:30 |
| 4. | "Nurses Whispering Verses" | 5:41 |
| 5. | "A Time for Rejoicing" | 2:06 |

=== Notes ===
- "Aukamacic" includes "Over", an outtake from "Over + Over + Over + Over".
- "A Big Noise in a Toy World" is stylised as "A BIG NOISE In a toy world".
- "Trade Mark", "Scratching Crawling Scrawling" and "As Cold as Can Be in an English Sea" are stylised in all caps.
- "Verses (Outtake)" is a backward section of "Nurses Whispering Verses" that precedes "Is This the Life".
- "A Time for Rejoicing" contains elements of "In Heaven (Lady in the Radiator Song)" by Peter Ivers from Eraserhead.

== Personnel ==
Credits adapted from the sleeve notes of Toy World and according to Eric Benac.

Cardiacs

- Tim Smith – guitar, keyboards, vocals
- Jim Smith – bass guitar, vocals
- Colvin Mayers (credited as Max Mayers) – keyboards (tracks 3, 4, 6, 8); vocals
- Sarah Cutts – keyboards, alto saxophone, clarinet, vocals
- Mark Cawthra – drums, vocals

Technical

- Mark Cawthra – engineering
- Peter Kunzler – engineering
- Cardiacs – production, mixing
- Tim Quy – live sound and Barclaycard
- Dominic Luckman – lights
