= Salisbury Arts Centre =

Arts centre in England

Coordinates: 51.07224°N 1.79183°W

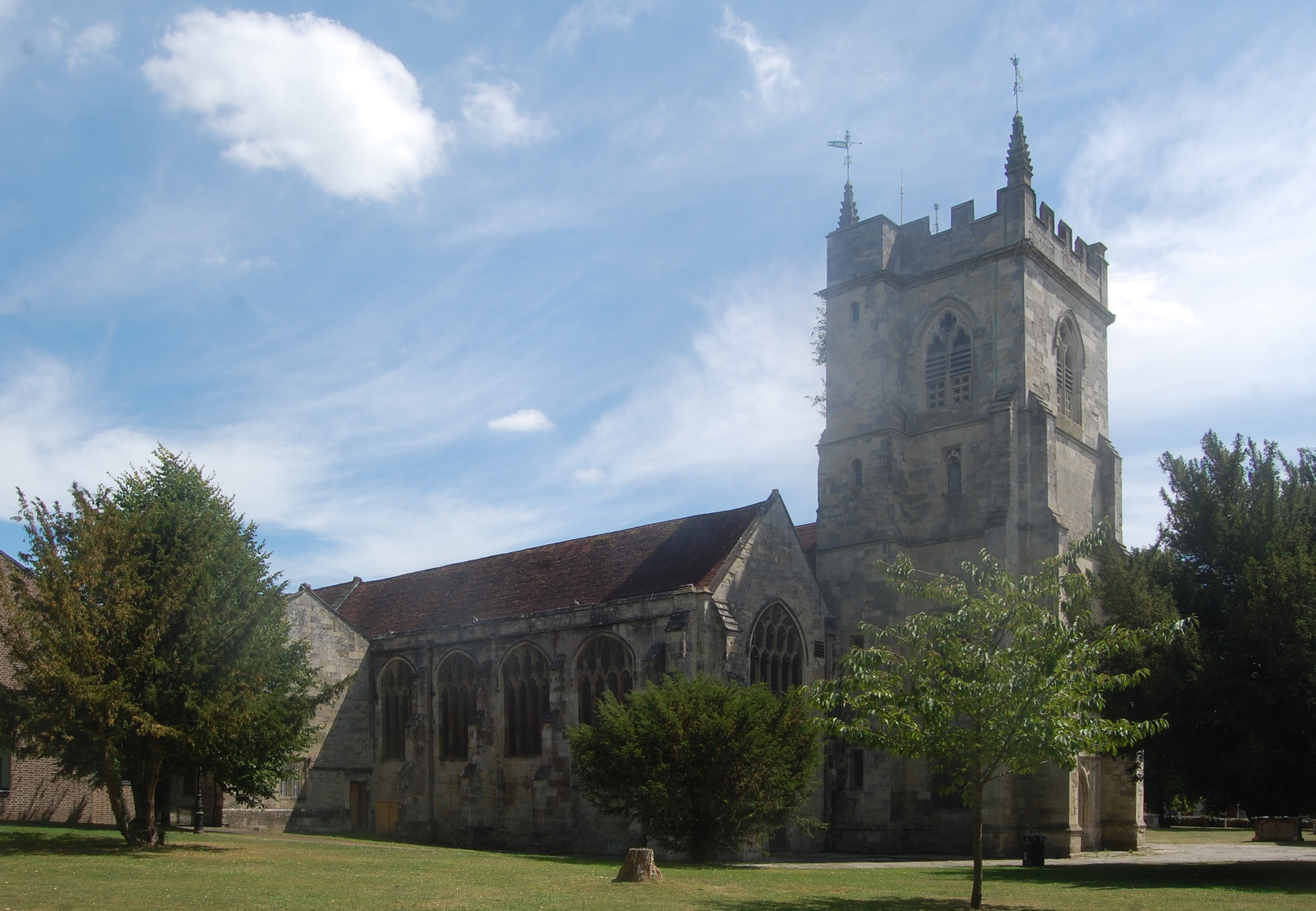
Salisbury Arts Centre (formerly St Edmund's church)

Salisbury Arts Centre is a venue in Salisbury, Wiltshire, England. It is run by Wiltshire Creative, a charity which provides opportunities for members of the community to experience the arts.

The centre stages a range of educational and community events, many of them free, and it also participates at events in and around the city, including the Larmer Tree Festival.

The centre is housed in the deconsecrated St Edmund's Church on Bedwin Street in central Salisbury. Its main performance space can hold 164 people seated or 400 standing. It also has a studio space called the White Room that seats 60, a media space, a multi-purpose arts and crafts space, a pottery studio, an exhibition space, a café, a bar, and staff offices.

== History ==
In July 1974, the Salisbury Festival of the Arts (now Salisbury International Arts Festival) was held in the church, with a programme of classical music and an exhibition of batik paintings. The festival programme asked visitors to suggest ideas for the use of the building – which had been declared redundant earlier that year – and in 1975 the church's committee agreed to grant use as an arts venue. St Edmunds Arts Trust was established and a group of volunteers coordinated exhibitions from local artists, and workshops for various crafts.

The Arts Centre continued to develop in the next decades. Between 1979 and 1981, Sir Henry Moore loaned his Reclining Figure (Time Life 1953) to the Centre, where it was positioned outside the main entrance.

By the 1990s the Arts Centre was threatened with closure due to funding cuts but supporters from the community soon launched a "Save Our Arts Centre" campaign. A new funding plan was accepted and the Arts Centre carried on.

By 2003 the Arts Centre had raised funds for a refurbishment project. The £4.2m capital re-development improved the heating, added new level flooring, created various spaces within the main building, improved the toilets, installed new technical equipment, and added an extension on the north side of the former church, providing offices and workshops. Salisbury Arts Centre reopened in 2005 with a new programme of events.

In 2018 the Arts Centre merged with Salisbury Playhouse and Salisbury International Arts Festival to form Wiltshire Creative. St Edmunds Arts Trust was amalgamated with the Playhouse's charity, which was also renamed to Wiltshire Creative.

== Notable activities ==
Salisbury Arts Centre regularly programmes disability events and works in collaboration with disability arts organisations. It works with various community groups and provides free events, including the annual Family Fiesta and the regular Live Lunches.

The Arts Centre supports a number of resident artists, including ceramicist Mirka Golden-Hann, who studies colour and glaze technology. Its gallery also mounts a variety of exhibitions. The Centre also hosts concerts, including the regular Altar Club band nights, film nights, and other cultural events. A number of entertainers have performed at Salisbury Arts Centre early in their careers; for example the Manic Street Preachers played in November 1990.

In 2015 the Centre was in the news after local residents protested the sudden removal of all municipal funding.

== St Edmund's Church ==
A collegiate church on this site was founded in 1269 by Bishop de la Wyle and dedicated to Saint Edmund of Abingdon, the former Archbishop of Canterbury who had been canonised in 1246. At first there were to be a provost and thirteen priests, but the income of the college (some coming from charter fairs) was not adequate to support that number; the full complement was in place in the middle of the next century, after the grant of income from Whiteparish, Winterbourne Earls and Winterborne St Martin. In the 15th century the college was again in financial difficulty, and like others it was surrendered to Henry VIII in the 1540s.

The 13th-century church was rebuilt in the early 15th century, cruciform in plan with a central tower. In 1653 the tower collapsed, severely damaging the nave to its west. The tower was rebuilt, the nave demolished and the 15th-century chancel converted to a nave. A small chancel was added at the east end in the 1840s, and restoration in 1865–67 by Sir George Gilbert Scott included enlargement of the chancel.

The church was designated as Grade II* listed in 1952. The building was declared redundant in 1974, and its parish was merged into that of St Thomas in the city centre.

== Notable people ==
- Clare Hunter, artist and writer, was formerly the director of the centre
