= Susannah's Still Alive =

1967 single by Dave Davies

- West German picture sleeve

Single by Dave Davies
- B-side: "Funny Face"
- Released: 24 November 1967
- Recorded: October 1967
- Studio: Pye, London
- Genre: Pop, folk pop
- Length: 2:22
- Label: Pye
- Songwriter: Dave Davies
- Producer: Ray Davies

Dave Davies singles chronology
"Death of a Clown" (1967)	"Susannah's Still Alive" (1967)	"Lincoln County" (1968)

"Susannah's Still Alive" ("Suzanah's Still Alive" on the original UK release) is a song by Dave Davies, released for his second solo single. The recording featured all of the Kinks' members as his backing band. It was a hit (peaking at No. 20 in the UK) but it did not live up to the expectations of Davies' last single "Death of a Clown", which was a Top 5 hit. It failed to chart in the US, but was a significant success in Europe, reaching No. 10 in the Netherlands, No. 27 in Germany, No. 18 in Belgium and No. 18 in Sweden. Although it was never featured on an LP, its B-side "Funny Face" was included on the Kinks' 1967 album Something Else by the Kinks.

Although all original UK singles used the spelling 'Suzanah', in many other countries and on later compilation albums Suzannah or Susannah was used.

== Personnel ==
According to band researcher Doug Hinman:

The Kinks

- Dave Davies – lead vocal, electric guitar
- Ray Davies – acoustic guitar, piano, harmonica
- Pete Quaife – bass
- Mick Avory – drums

Additional musician

- Nicky Hopkins – piano

== Cardiacs version ==
"Susannah's Still Alive"

Single by Cardiacs
- Released: 5 September 1988
- Recorded: Summer 1988
- Studio: The Slaughterhouse (Yorkshire)
- Label: Alphabet Business Concern
- Songwriter: Dave Davies
- Producer: Tim Smith

Cardiacs singles chronology
"Is This the Life" (1988)	"Susannah's Still Alive" (1988)	"Night Tracks (The Janice Long Session)" (1988)

"Susannah's Still Alive" is the fourth single and only cover version ever recorded by Cardiacs. As well as being released as a single, the track was also on the Kinks tribute album, Shangri-La - A Tribute to The Kinks.

=== Personnel ===
Credits adapted from the 12" liner notes. Personnel according to Eric Benac:

- Tim Smith – guitar, vocals
- Jim Smith – bass, vocals
- Sarah Smith – sax, vocals
- William D. Drake – keyboards, vocals
- Dominic Luckman – drums
- Tim Quy – percussion, vocals

Technical

- Tim Smith – production
- Roger Tebbutt – production assistance, engineering

Locations

- Recorded at the Slaughterhouse in Yorkshire, England in the Summer 1988
- "Blind in Safety and Leafy in Love" recorded under the bed
