= Songs for Ships and Irons =

Compilation album by Cardiacs
- Released: 16 September 1991 (Note: The Encyclopedia of Popular Music indicates a release year of 1990.)
- Length: 45:49
- Label: Alphabet Business Concern
- Producer: Tim Smith

Cardiacs chronology
On Land and in the Sea (1989)	Songs for Ships and Irons (1991)	Heaven Born and Ever Bright (1992)

Professional ratings
Review scores
Source	Rating
Encyclopedia of Popular Music	4/5 stars

Songs for Ships and Irons is a 1991 collection of non-album singles and B-sides by Cardiacs. It combines the whole of the Big Ship extended play, the whole of the "There's Too Many Irons In The Fire" 12-inch single and the B-sides of the "Susannah's Still Alive" 12-inch single. It also includes a bonus song called "Everything is Easy," a longstanding live favorite not previously released as a studio recording. Some of the quiet talking in between tracks from the original Big Ship mini-album differs from the original release in having been edited/lowered in volume.

The album was out of print, but is available from the Cardiacs website.

== Track listing ==
All songs written by Tim Smith unless otherwise indicated.

Side one
No.	Title	Writer(s)	Length
1.	"Big Ship"		5:47
2.	"Tarred and Feathered"	William D. Drake, Smith	3:31
3.	"Burn Your House Brown"		2:37
4.	"Stoneage Dinosaurs"		5:22
5.	"Plane Plane Against the Grain"		1:21
Total length:			18:38

Side two
No.	Title	Writer(s)	Length
6.	"Everything Is Easy!"		3:49
7.	"There's Too Many Irons in the Fire"		3:17
8.	"All Spectacular"		2:35
9.	"Blind in Safety and Leafy in Love"	Drake, Smith	2:46
10.	"Loosefish Scapegrace"		7:46
11.	"All His Geese Are Swans!"		6:58
Total length:			27:11

== Personnel ==
- Tim Smith – guitar, vocals
- Jim Smith – bass
- Sarah Smith – saxophone
- William D. Drake – keyboards
- Dominic Luckman – drums
- Tim Quy – percussion
