= Archive Cardiacs =

Compilation album by Cardiacs
- Released: 1989
- Recorded: 1977–1979
- Length: 43:06
- Label: Alphabet Business Concern
- Producer: Miss Swift; The Consultant

Cardiacs chronology
Cardiacs Live (1988)	Archive Cardiacs (1989)	On Land and in the Sea (1989)

Professional ratings
Review scores
Source	Rating
Encyclopedia of Popular Music	3/5 stars
The Virgin Encyclopedia of Eighties Music	3/5 stars

Archive Cardiacs (or simply Archive) is a compilation album by English rock band Cardiacs. The album is composed of early tracks by the band recorded from 1977 to 1979. The tracks were compiled from Cardiacs' demo albums The Obvious Identity (1980) and Toy World (1981), as well as four pieces recorded by Tim Smith and Dominic Luckman for a side project that never saw fruition.

The album was originally released on cassette in 1989 exclusively available to the Cardiacs Yousletter Family and was reissued on CD in 1995.

== Track listing ==
All tracks written and arranged by Tim Smith, except where noted.

No.	Title	Writer(s)	Length
1.	"Aukamacic"		0:45
2.	"Icky Qualms"		2:15
3.	"Piffol Four Times*"		2:49
4.	"Scratching Crawling Scrawling"		0:56
5.	"As Cold as Can Be in an English Sea"		7:12
6.	"T.V.T.V.*"		3:49
7.	"My Trade Mark"		3:40
8.	"The Obvious Identity"		2:02
9.	"Piffol One Time*"		6:49
10.	"A Game for Bertie's Party"	Mark Cawthra; Smith	5:26
11.	"Piffol Three Times*"		5:38
12.	"Rock Around the Clock"	Colvin Mayers	1:45
Total length:			43:01

Tracks marked with * are demo tracks created by Tim Smith and Dominic Luckman for a side project that never saw fruition.

== Personnel ==
Adapted from the Archive Cardiacs liner notes.

- Tim Quy – bass guitar, percussion
- Jim Smith – bass guitar, vocals
- Sarah Smith – saxophones, clarinets, keyboards, recorders
- Tim Smith – guitar, drums, vocals, flutes, keyboards, percussion
- Mark Cawthra – drums, keyboards, vocals
- Michael Pugh – vocals
- Colvin Mayers – keyboards
- Dominic Luckman – drums

Technical

- Miss Swift – production
- The Consultant – production

== Chart performance ==
The 2021 streaming re-release reached number 73 on the New Zealand iTunes Chart.
