= Heaven Born and Ever Bright =

- Original CD cover

Studio album by Cardiacs
- Released: 15 May 1992 (Note: iTunes and Deezer indicate a release date of 24 September 1991, with an article in The Quietus also listing 1991 as the year.)
- Recorded: 1991
- Studios: Boundary Row Studios, London; 811 Sound Studios, Cowford
- Length: 45:03
- Label: Alphabet Business Concern
- Producer: Tim Smith

Cardiacs chronology
Songs for Ships and Irons (1991)	Heaven Born and Ever Bright (1992)	All That Glitters Is a Mares Nest (1995)

Alternative cover
- 1995 cover, on which later releases are based

Singles from Heaven Born and Ever Bright
- 1. "Day Is Gone" Released: 28 October 1991

Heaven Born and Ever Bright (Note: Written Heavenborn and Ever Bright in The Rough Guide to Rock) is the third studio album by British rock band Cardiacs, released on 15 May 1992 through the band's label Alphabet Business Concern, originally marketed by Rough Trade and distributed by Rough Trade and Pinnacle. It was produced by Tim Smith, engineered by David Murder and mixed by both. Due to Rough Trade going bankrupt soon after the album's release, it was scarce until reissued in 1995. This reissue was remastered and given new cover art.

== Lineup changes ==
Heaven Born and Ever Bright was the first Cardiacs album since the departure of almost half of the "classic" lineup. Percussionist Tim Quy left Cardiacs in 1990, and did not work with them again. Saxophonist Sarah Smith and keyboardist William D. Drake also stopped touring with the band, although they both contributed to the album and would make occasional guest appearances at concerts. New guitarist Christian Hayes left Cardiacs before Heaven Born and Ever Bright was finished, although it still features many of his guitar and vocal performances as well as songwriting contributions. Hayes was replaced by Jon Poole who is listed as a band member and featured on the album cover; according to Poole however, by the time he joined the album was already in the mixing stage and his only contribution was the intro sound effect in "March". The album was also the last to feature drummer Dominic Luckman, who would quit in 1993.

== Reaction ==
Professional ratings
Review scores
Source	Rating
Encyclopedia of Popular Music	3/5 stars
NME	7/10
Q	3/5 stars
Select	4/5; 2/5
Uncut	7/10

In 2005, when asked what his favourite Cardiacs album is by Popular I Magazine, Tim Smith said "I like them all for their own reasons. Sorry. However, I will defend one of them as it wasn’t so well received when it popped out and that one is Heaven Born And Ever Bright. I think it came out exactly how it was intended to. A lot of people seem to think it was a bit of an accident." Similarly, asked in 2001 if Sing to God was his favourite Cardiacs album, Smith said "No… I sort of like them all in one way or another….a funny thing is that the album our fans seem to dislike the most is one that I am very proud of…. the Heaven Born And Ever Bright album which we did back in 1991…it’s got a really weird sound to it…I reckon all our albums sound completely different to each other anyway…unless you hate the stuff and then I suppose they will all sound exactly the same….and shit…and there’s an awful lot of people who share that opinion."

In a 2025 buyer's guide to Cardiacs for an article covering the album LSD, the magazine Uncut called Heaven Born and Ever Bright "a strange, unsettled album that suffers for sitting between two peaks in the Cardiacs' recorded history" while noting "its share of great moments", including "Goodbye Grace" "fulminat[ing] with curious experiments."

== Track listing ==
All tracks are written by Tim Smith, except where noted. Vinyl releases have tracks 1–6 on Side One, and tracks 7–11 on Side Two.

Heaven Born and Ever Bright track listing
No.	Title	Writer(s)	Length
1.	"The Alphabet Business Concern (Home of Fadeless Splendour)"	T. Smith; Jim Smith	3:58
2.	"She Is Hiding Behind the Shed"		4:19
3.	"March"		3:17
4.	"Goodbye Grace"	T. Smith; Christian Hayes	3:56
5.	"Anything I Can't Eat"		3:24
6.	"Helen and Heaven"	T. Smith; Hayes	3:08
7.	"Bodysbad"		4:06
8.	"For Good and All"	T. Smith; Hayes	4:42
9.	"Core"		2:31
10.	"Day Is Gone"		3:17
11.	"Snakes-a-Sleeping"		8:25
Total length:			45:03

Notes

- Hayes is credited as a writer of "Core" rather than "Goodbye Grace" on 1992 versions of the album, and is not credited for "Helen and Heaven" and "For Good and All" in the 1995 CD liner notes but still on the CD itself.

== Personnel ==
Cardiacs

- Tim Smith – vocals, guitar, keyboards
- Jim Smith – bass, vocals
- Jon Poole – guitar, vocals
- Dominic Luckman – drums

Assisted by:

- Sarah Smith – saxophone (tracks 1, 3, 4, 6, 7 and 8)
- Christian Hayes – guitar and vocals
- William D. Drake – Television Organ (track 6)
- The Alphabet Business Concern – other keyboards and noises

Technical

- Tim Smith – mixing, production
- David Murder – mixing, engineering

== Charts ==
Weekly chart performance for Heaven Born and Ever Bright
Chart (2024)	Peak position
UK Albums Sales (OCC)	65
UK Physical Albums (OCC)	60
UK Vinyl Albums (OCC)	38
UK Record Store (OCC)	10
UK Independent Albums (OCC)	14
UK Independent Album Breakers (OCC)	6
