= Big Ship (EP) =

EP by Cardiacs
- Released: 27 January 1987
- Recorded: 1986
- Studios: Raven (New Cross); Soft Option
- Length: 18:36
- Label: Alphabet Business Concern
- Producers: Tim Smith; Graham Simmonds (Note: Simmonds is credited as a producer in the liner notes but credited only for mixing on the record itself.)

Cardiacs chronology
Rude Bootleg (1986)	Big Ship (1987)	A Little Man and a House and the Whole World Window (1988)

Big Ship is an extended play (EP) or mini-album by the English band Cardiacs, released in January 1987 by the Alphabet Business Concern. It is a 12‑inch vinyl record played at the speed of a single (45 rpm) and was issued with a lyric insert.

The anthemic title track has become a key Cardiacs song, played at nearly every concert and appearing on most of their live albums. "Tarred and Feathered" and "Burn Your House Brown" were also played by the band into the 1990s and 2000s.

== Trivia ==
The song "Tarred and Feathered" incorporates, as its final lyric segment, the third verse of the hymn "O God, who metest in thine hand" by Richard Frederick Littledale.

== Critical reception ==
Professional ratings
Review scores
Source	Rating
Underground	1/3 stars

In Melody Maker, Mick Mercer reviewed Big Ship in skeptical tones. While praising the "impressively restrained operation" of "Stoneage Dinosaurs", he also noted that "the title track sounds like those ancient monsters Procol Harum, trapped in some horrendous storm. Memories of Gruppo Sportivo even come sneaking through, but The Cardiacs hold their own ridiculous heads high, only wreaking their vocals, the heavy keyboards and thumping bass refusing to crumble. Unfortunately "Tarred and Feathered" sounds like spotty kids running round a piano, while the dustbin drums of "Burn Your House Brown" reminds me only of dreamy Saturday afternoons when the Play Away band would do their thing." Mercer also commented that "with Cardiacs everything is accidental, especially good taste. Arrest these peasants before they get another chance."

The mini-album was given a similarly lukewarm review by Julian Henry in Underground. In his view the album didn't "live up to (the band's) visual appearance", although he went on to call it "clever" and "humorous in a jolly titter-titter way".

== Availability and reissuing ==
Big Ship has been reissued from the Alphabet Business Concern label and is available on CD. All of the tracks from the mini-album were reissued on the Songs for Ships and Irons compilation (originally released in 1991 and reissued on CD in 1995).

== Track listing ==
All tracks are written by Tim Smith, except "Tarred and Feathered" co-written by William D. Drake.

Side one
No.	Title	Length
1.	"Big Ship"	5:47
2.	"Tarred and Feathered"	3:31
Total length:		9:18

Side two
No.	Title	Length
1.	"Burn Your House Brown"	2:37
2.	"Stoneage Dinosaurs"	5:22
3.	"Plane Plane Against the Grain"	1:21
Total length:		9:20

== Personnel ==
Credits adapted from Big Ship EP liner notes.

Locations

- Recorded at Raven Studios; except "Plane Plane Against the Grain" recorded at Soft Option Studios

Cardiacs

- Tim Quy – marimba, synthesizer, curious percussives
- Tim Smith – electric guitar, main voice
- Jim Smith – electric bass, voice
- Sarah Smith – saxophones, clarinets, voice
- William D. Drake – electric and acoustic keyboards, voice
- Dominic Luckman – drum, voice

Technical

- Tim Smith – production, mixing
- Graham Simmonds – production, mixing
- Nigel Gilroy – engineer at Raven Studios
- Roger Tebbutt – engineer at Soft Option Studios

Artwork

- Cardiacs – compiling
- Reg Ganz – front cover lettering
- Tony Stringer – front cover photograph
- Mike Tate – final artwork photography
