= A Little Man and a House and the Whole World Window =

Studio album by Cardiacs
- Released: 21 March 1988
- Recorded: 1985–1987
- Studio: The Workhouse (London)
- Genres: Progressive rock; art rock; pop
- Length: 44:47
- Labels: Alphabet Business Concern; Torso
- Producer: Tim Smith

Cardiacs chronology
Big Ship (1987)	A Little Man and a House and the Whole World Window (1988)	Cardiacs Live (1988)

Singles from A Little Man and a House and the Whole World Window
- 1. "Is This the Life" Released: March 1988

A Little Man and a House and the Whole World Window is the debut studio album by the English rock band Cardiacs. (Note: A Little Man and a House is officially considered to be the band's first proper studio album. It is Cardiacs' fourth album if their cassette only releases The Obvious Identity (1980), Toy World (1981) and The Seaside (1984) are taken into account.) It was released on 21 March 1988 in the United Kingdom by their own label the Alphabet Business Concern and in the Netherlands by Torso Records. Its single "Is This the Life" saw brief chart success due to exposure on mainstream radio, and garnered the attention of a wider audience when it entered the Independent Top 10 in the UK, peaking at number 80.

The band re-recorded many tracks from their previous album, The Seaside, this time with a larger budget and better studio equipment. With manager Mark Walmesley and engineer Graham Simmonds (previously a Cardiacs member), the group coloured much of the recordings with sound effects and orchestration, as exemplified on "A Little Man and a House", "The Breakfast Line" and "Victory Egg". Recording was completed in 1987.

== Background ==
By 1986, Cardiacs had reached a stable line-up that included sax player Sarah Smith (then Tim Smith's wife), drummer Dominic Luckman, percussionist Tim Quy and keyboardist William D. Drake, along with the core Smith brothers, Tim and the bass player Jim.

Whilst recording the Seaside album, Smith started writing longer, more theatrical compositions, inspired by the likes of the Red Krayola, Devo, Frank Zappa and Slapp Happy. According to music journalist Sean Kitching, this initiation into avant-garde afforded Cardiacs some of the "most sublime and effortlessly happy moments" that defined the group's next project, A Little Man and a House and the Whole World Window. The addition of keyboardist William D. Drake in the lineup also revamped the Cardiacs sound. Smith and Drake co-wrote the songs "I'm Eating in Bed" (Note: Sometimes listed as "Eating in Bed".) and the album closer "The Whole World Window". Smith wrote the album's interlude in his youth, when he was about 13 years old. Many tracks from the album were previously released in other forms.

== Recording and production ==
Sessions began in 1985 at The Workhouse Studios (formerly Maximum Sound Studios), marking the first time that Cardiacs had done a proper studio recording. The studio loaned the band £40,000 to record the album, which they finished two years later in 1987. The album was produced by Smith.

"Is This the Life" was released as a single in March 1988, managing to chart due to exposure on mainstream radio, peaking at number 80 in the UK. It remains the most famous track by the band.

== Releases, availability and reissues ==
A Little Man and a House and the Whole World Window was originally released on vinyl LP and cassette by the band's record label Alphabet Business Concern, on 21 March 1988. It was subsequently released on CD by the Dutch record label Torso Records with five bonus tracks added – the three tracks from the previous "There's Too Many Irons in the Fire" single ("There's Too Many Irons in the Fire", "All Spectacular" and "Loosefish Scapegrace") plus the B-side tracks from the "Is This the Life" 12" single ("Goosegash" and "I'm Eating in Bed"). Alphabet released a number of CDs which were actually the Dutch Torso Records version (TORSO CD060), with an Alphabet album number sticker over the Torso release (although the CD has the Torso number printed on it.)

The album was reissued on CD in 1995 (along with the rest of the band's back catalogue) by Alphabet Business Concern. The track listing on this release followed the original vinyl and cassette track listing and removed all of the bonus tracks, with the exception of "I'm Eating in Bed" which was reinstated as the album's third track in accordance with the wishes of the band.

After a long period of unavailability, the album was re-pressed in August 2007, and again in 2013 for its 25th anniversary, and is available on the band's official website.

For its 35th anniversary in 2023, the album received a remaster and expanded boxset treatment, quickly selling out. This release was one of Tim Smith's last contributions for Cardiacs, having overseen the process in 2020. Tim Quy also provided an interview for the release's booklet before his passing.

== Critical reception ==
Professional ratings
Review scores
Source	Rating
AllMusic	2.5/5 stars
Encyclopedia of Popular Music	4/5 stars
Classic Rock	9/10 stars
Record Collector	4/5 stars
Sounds	4 stars
Uncut	9/10
The Virgin Encyclopedia of Eighties Music	3/5 stars
Vive Le Rock	8/10

The album was a temporary breakthrough for Cardiacs, getting reviews in major magazines. In New Musical Express, reviewer Jack O'Neill savaged the album for what he perceived to be its retrospective musical approach and (in his opinion) unwelcome leanings towards progressive rock. "Just when you thought Marillion had taken us to the very limit along comes this schizo-progressive anachronism wherein the Cardiacs have telescoped the entire dreggs of the early seventies into one album so geriatric, by comparison that the next Blue Öyster Cult will sound as fresh as Viva Hate. It is the Floyd, it is Genesis, it is King Crimson, does it matter? A Little Man... is the very worst bits of Tommy stretched out to an eternity; it's Emerson, Lake & Palmer; it's Brain Salad Burglary as the NME of its day might have said. By way of variation 'In a City Lining' knocks off one of those Neil Young/Mission cryogenic guitar solos and to bewilder us completely there is a nutty body-stomp midway through "Is This the Life" which resides about as comfortable as Ian Paisley in the Vatican. Cardiacs are the sound of both feet in the grave."

In 2004, Martijn Voorvelt of Perfect Sound Forever called the album Cardiacs' "first 'proof of genius'". In a 2025 buyer's guide to Cardiacs for an article covering the album LSD, the magazine Uncut called A Little Man and a House and the Whole World Window "an astonishingly creative debut."

== Track listing ==
All tracks are written by Tim Smith, except "The Whole World Window" and "I'm Eating in Bed" co-written by William D. Drake.

Original version
No.	Title	Length
1.	"A Little Man and a House"	5:05
2.	"In a City Lining"	5:52
3.	"Is This the Life"	5:37
4.	"Interlude"	0:47
5.	"Dive"	4:09
6.	"The Icing on the World"	4:02
7.	"The Breakfast Line"	4:55
8.	"Victory"	3:08
9.	"R.E.S."	5:16
10.	"The Whole World Window"	5:56
Total length:		44:47

Torso CD bonus tracks
No.	Title	Length
11.	"Goosegash"	1:56
12.	"Loosefish Scapegrace"	7:46
13.	"I'm Eating in Bed"	5:06
14.	"There's Too Many Irons in the Fire"	3:16
15.	"All Spectacular"	2:35

1995 re-release and future versions
No.	Title	Length
1.	"A Little Man and a House"	5:05
2.	"In a City Lining"	5:52
3.	"I'm Eating in Bed" (track remains absent from LP releases)	5:06
4.	"Is This the Life"	5:37
5.	"Interlude"	0:47
6.	"Dive"	4:09
7.	"The Icing on the World"	4:02
8.	"The Breakfast Line"	4:55
9.	"Victory Egg"	3:08
10.	"R.E.S."	5:16
11.	"The Whole World Window"	5:56
Total length:		49:53

== Personnel ==
- Tim Quy – marimba, general percussives, synthesiser
- Tim Smith – lead voice, guitar, flutes, recorders
- Jim Smith – bass guitar, voice
- Sarah Smith – saxophones, clarinets, recorders, voice
- William D. Drake – keyboards, voice
- Dominic Luckman – drums

with:

- Ashley Slater – tenor and bass trombones
- Phil Cesar – trumpet, flugel horn, soprano trumpet
- Elaine Herman – violins
- The Consultant, Miss Swift and Mark Walmesley – voices

Technical

- Tim Smith – producer
- Pete Hammond – executive producer
- Graham Simmonds, Pete Hammond, Roger Tebbutt, Spencer Henderson and Stuart Barry – engineering
- Maxwell Anandappa – plating
