= The Seaside (album) =

1984 demo album by Cardiacs

- Original cassette cover

Demo album by Cardiacs
- Released: 1984 (Note: Some sources indicate a release year of 1983, while others indicate 1984. The copyright year of 1984 is written on the album.)
- Recorded: 1980–1983
- Studio: Crow (London)
- Length: 57:06
- Label: Alphabet
- Producers: Tim Smith; Graham Simmonds

Cardiacs chronology
Toy World (1981)	The Seaside (1984)	Rude Bootleg (1986)

Professional ratings
Review scores
Source	Rating
Encyclopedia of Popular Music	3/5 stars
Record Collector	4 stars
The Virgin Encyclopedia of Eighties Music	3/5 stars

The Seaside is the third demo album from English rock group Cardiacs. The album originally featured the second recording of what would become the band's only hit single, "Is This the Life?". It is the last of the band's releases to feature keyboard player/drummer/singer Mark Cawthra and the first to feature keyboard player William D. Drake (as well as being the only album to feature two other musicians who were briefly Cardiacs members - Graham Simmonds and Marguerite Johnson).

The album is composed of material the band had written and performed between 1980 and 1983. Initially The Seaside was only produced on cassette (as with earlier Cardiacs album releases), and was only made available through the band's fan club and at concerts. It is notable for having been the first formal release on the band's own label, the Alphabet Business Concern, and a showcases a much cleaner, fuller sound than their previous cassette tapes. The cassette has three known versions - the first featuring a stamped sleeve, the second a black and white picture of bass player Jim Smith, and the third a coloured version.

Several tracks on the cassette album were re-recorded for subsequent releases. "Is This the Life?", "A Little Man and a House" and "R.E.S." were all re-recorded and released five years later on Cardiacs' 1988 album A Little Man and a House and the Whole World Window. "Nurses Whispering Verses" was eventually re-recorded a decade later for the band's 1996 album Sing to God (albeit with different lyrics). Earlier recordings of "Nurses Whispering Verses" and "Is This the Life?" had previously appeared on the Toy World cassette.

The album captures the band in a transitional phase, with two distinct lineups of the band featured. Both featured Mark Cawthra (who moved between drums and keyboards during different recording sessions) and his voice is featured prominently on the album, occasionally sharing lead vocals with Tim Smith. Cawthra would leave the band amicably during the sessions for The Seaside in order to pursue his own projects.

== Reissues ==
Cover art for the 1990 and 1995 reissues

Cover art for the 2015 reissue, based on the full-colour artwork for the album's second cassette release

The Seaside was reissued on CD in 1990 and 1995, with "Nurses Whispering Verses", "Is This the Life?", "A Little Man and a House" and "Dinner Time" all removed from the track listing. The reason provided for these omissions was that the master tape containing those four songs had been damaged and the recordings lost. Despite that, 30 November 2015 saw the release of The Seaside: Original Edition box set which reinstated, and remastered, all the original tracks. The 2014 remaster was done using the original album tapes. With additional punch to the bass and kick drum, the sound is a closer approximation of the original cassette than the treble heavier 1990s releases. A download voucher features alternate mixes of three tracks from the 1990s releases; the box set includes a photobook featuring promo photography by Robin Fransella as well as a replica of the original cassette release and lyric booklet. Also included are replicas of the Alphabet Business Concern's YOUsletters, photos and flyers from 1984, and four badges.

In his review for The Quietus, Sean Kitching praised the 2015 mix and packaging. He commented: "it sounds far better than the treble heavy 90s CD versions, which nevertheless doesn't appear to cheer the crestfallen face of Jim Smith now returning to his rightful place on the front cover." Zac of Caught in the Crossfire said that "Hearing "Dinner Time" on the new re-issue today made me bounce off the walls. It was like discovering Cardiacs for the very first time again."

== Track listing ==
All tracks written and arranged by Tim Smith, except where noted. Writing credits per the Cardiacs Book; lyrics not credited on album.

Side A
No.	Title	Lyrics	Music	Length
1.	"Jibber and Twitch"			4:48
2.	"Gina Lollabrigida"			3:13
3.	"Hello Mr. Sparrow"		T. Smith; Sarah Smith	4:33
4.	"It's a Lovely Day"		T. Smith; Colvin Mayers; Mark Cawthra; S. Smith	3:25
5.	"A Wooden Fish on Wheels" (*)	T. Smith; Cawthra		3:22
6.	"Nurses Whispering Verses"			6:03

Side B
No.	Title	Lyrics	Length
1.	"Is This the Life"		5:03
2.	"A Little Man and a House"		4:15
3.	"Hope Day"		6:36
4.	"Dinner Time"		4:35
5.	"Ice a Spot and a Dot on the Dog" (*)	T. Smith; Cawthra	3:34
6.	"R.E.S."		5:26
7.	"To Go Off and Things" (*)	Cawthra	2:13

CD re-issue, 1990, 1995
No.	Title	Writer(s)	Length
1.	"Jibber and Twitch"		4:35
2.	"Gina Lollabrigida"		3:11
3.	"Hello Mr. Sparrow"	T. Smith; S. Smith	4:33
4.	"It's a Lovely Day"	T. Smith; Cawthra; Mayers; S. Smith	3:25
5.	"A Wooden Fish on Wheels" (*)		3:22
6.	"Hope Day"		6:20
7.	"Ice a Spot and a Dot on the Dog" (*)		3:34
8.	"R.E.S."		5:26
9.	"To Go Off and Things" (*)	T. Smith; Cawthra	2:13

Digital Bonus Tracks, 2015
No.	Title	Length
14.	"Jibber and Twitch (Short intro)"	4:35
15.	"Gina Lollabrigida (Full ending)"	3:11
16.	"Hope Day (Short intro)"	6:20

== Personnel ==
- Tim Smith – guitar, vocals
- Jim Smith – bass, vocals
- Sarah Smith – tenor saxophone, clarinet
- Mark Cawthra – keyboards and vocals except *, drums on *
- William D. Drake – keyboards
- Graham Simmonds – guitar
- Marguerite Johnston – alto saxophone
- Tim Quy – marimba, percussion
- Dominic Luckman – drums

Additional musicians

- Lanze Lorrens – trumpet, backing vocals
- Mike Peters – trumpet
- Nick Pell – trumpet
- Tim Hills – trombone
- Wendy Collins – backing vocals

Technical

- Produced by Tim Smith and Graham Simmonds
- Engineered by Graham Simmonds

== Seaside Treats ==
Seaside Treats

Video by Cardiacs
- Released: 31 December 1984
- Length: 22:38
- Labels: Jettisoundz; Alphabet
- Director: Tim Smith
- Producer: Tim Smith

Cardiacs video chronology
Seaside Treats (1984)	All That Glitters Is a Maresnest (1992)

Seaside Treats

EP by Cardiacs
- Released: 1985
- Length: 18:38
- Label: Alphabet
- Producers: Tim Smith; Graham Simmonds

Seaside Treats is a video and extended play (EP) consisting of three and four songs from The Seaside respectively. The video could be found in the very small number of "Seaside bags" sold at concerts which also contained the EP, the Cardiacs Book, a poster, a badge and a stick of Cardiacs seaside rock. The VHS, featuring alternative comedy sketches by the band, was released on 31 December 1984, and the 12-inch EP in 1985. A promo video for "A Little Man and a House" also appeared on the Jettisoundz compilation VHS Pirates of the Panasoniks.

=== Track listing ===
All tracks written and arranged by Tim Smith; lyrics of "To Go Off and Things" by Mark Cawthra.

Side one

1. "A Little Man and a House" – 4:23
2. "Hope Day" – 6:36

Side two

1. "R.E.S." – 5:25
2. "To Go Off and Things" – 2:14

Video

1. "A Little Man and a House"
2. "R.E.S."
3. "To Go Off and Things"

=== Personnel ===
Cardiacs

- Tim Quy – marimba, percussion
- Tim Smith – guitar, vocals
- Jim Smith – bass guitar, vocals
- Sarah Smith – tenor saxophone, clarinet
- William D. Drake – keyboards, vocals
- Dominic Luckman – drums

with:

- Mark Cawthra – drums on "To Go Off and Things", keyboards and vocals on “A Little Man and a House”
- Marguerite Johnston – alto saxophone on "Hope Day" and "R.E.S."
- Graham Simmonds – electric guitar on "Hope Day" and "R.E.S."

Other musicians

- Nick Pell – trumpet on "A Little Man and a House"
- Wendy Collins – voice on "A Little Man and a House"
