= There's Too Many Irons in the Fire =

Song by Cardiacs

Single by Cardiacs
- A-side: "All Spectacular" (double A-side)
- B-side: "Loosefish Scapegrace"
- Released: 12 August 1987
- Studio: Soft Option Studios
- Genre: Pop
- Length: 3:16
- Label: Alphabet Business Concern
- Songwriter: Tim Smith
- Producer: Tim Smith

Cardiacs singles chronology
"A Bus for a Bus on the Bus" (1979)	"There's Too Many Irons in the Fire" (1987)	"Is This the Life" (1988)

"There's Too Many Irons in the Fire" is the second single by the English rock band Cardiacs, released on 12 August 1987.

== Critical reception ==
In the week of its release, There's Too Many Irons in the Fire was awarded "Single of the Week" in Sounds magazine. Reviewer Andy Hurt noted the band's apparent desire to rework 1970s influences for the 1980s, and commented that they were "well qualified for the task, being formed just after the eruption of punk, and representing the marriage between Van Der Graaf Generator and the Albertos." He went on to praise the band, asserting that "Cardiacs can write, Cardiacs can play, and by God Cardiacs can perform. The public are way ahead of the press in recognising this... Clever rock music that is not patronising and which has a sturdy backbone. Pretty damn fantastic actually."

== Availability and reissuing ==
There's Too Many Irons in the Fire has been deleted. All of the tracks on the single were later re-issued as part of the Songs for Ships and Irons compilation (originally released in 1991 and reissued on CD in 1995).

== Track listing ==
All tracks are written by Tim Smith.

A1. "There's Too Many Irons in the Fire" – 3:17
A2. "All Spectacular" – 2:35
B. "Loosefish Scapegrace" – 7:46

== Personnel ==
- Roger Tebbutt and Nick – recording, studio time
- Mike Tate – artwork

- Tim Quy – percussion, marimba, synthesizer
- Tim Smith – lead voice, guitar
- Jim Smith – bass guitar, singing
- Sarah Smith – saxophone, singing
- William D. Drake – keyboards, singing
- Dominic Luckman – drums

- The Consultant and Mark Swanky Tosser Walmesley – management
- Miss Swift – wisdom and guidance
- Dominic Parker – head roady
- Matthew Cutts – stage
- Mark Cawthra – live sound engineer
- Mike Cooper – lighting
- Colvin Mayers – lighting
- Bill Hiles – shop girl
