= Is This the Life =

Single by Cardiacs

from the album A Little Man and a House and the Whole World Window
- Released: 1988
- Studio: The Workhouse (London)
- Genre: New wave; post-punk; psychedelic
- Length: 5:39
- Label: Alphabet Business Concern; Torso
- Songwriter: Tim Smith
- Producer: Tim Smith

Cardiacs singles chronology
"There's Too Many Irons in the Fire" (1987)	"Is This the Life" (1988)	"Susannah's Still Alive" (1988)

"Is This the Life" (also written "Is This the Life?") is a song by English rock band Cardiacs from their debut studio album, A Little Man and a House and the Whole World Window (1988). The song was released on vinyl by the Alphabet Business Concern and Torso as the only single from the album. The song was previously recorded for the demo albums Toy World (1981) and The Seaside (1984). It also briefly attained chart success (peaking at number 80) after being played on various Radio 1 shows thanks to DJ Liz Kershaw. The Torso version of the 7" is exactly the same as the Alphabet release although it comes in a paper sleeve instead of a cardboard one. Only the Torso 12" differs in both track listing and cover design.

== Track listing ==
- Seven-inch single
1. "Is This the Life" – 5:36
2. "I'm Eating in Bed" – 5:06
- Twelve-inch single
1. "Is This the Life" – 5:36
2. "Goosegash" – 1:56
3. "I'm Eating in Bed" – 5:06

== Personnel ==
Credits adapted from the 12" single liner notes.

Studio locations

- Recorded at The Workhouse (Old Kent Rd, London)
- "Goosegash" was recorded at the Slaughterhouse (Driffield, Yorkshire)

Cardiacs

- Tim Quy – percussion; marimba on "I'm Eating in Bed", synthesiser on "Is This the Life"
- Tim Smith – lead vocals, electric guitar
- Jim Smith – bass guitar, backing vocals
- Sarah Smith – saxophones; clarinet on "I'm Eating in Bed", backing vocals
- William D. Drake – keyboards, backing vocals
- Dominic Luckman – drums

Also:

- Elain Herman – violins on "I'm Eating in Bed"

Technical

- Pete Hammond – engineering, executive producer
- Stuart Barry – engineering
- Graham Simmonds – engineering, final mixing (Side Two)
- Roger Tebbutt – final mixing (Side One)
- Tim Smith – producer

Artwork

- David Oliver – photography

== Charts ==
Weekly chart performance for "Is This the Life"
Chart (1988)	Peak position
UK Singles (OCC)	80
