= List of songs written by William D. Drake =

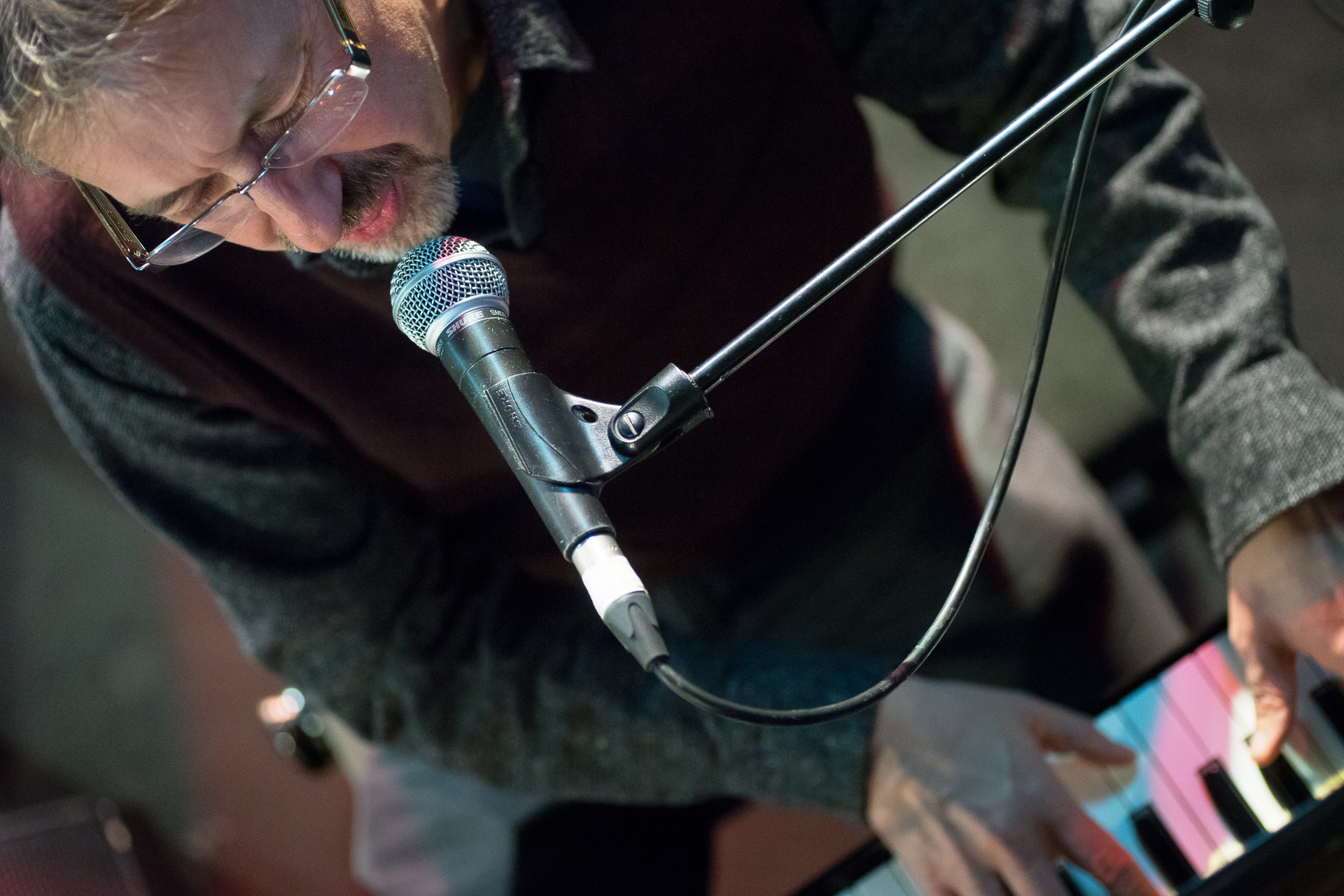
Drake performing at Daylight Music on 17 October 2015

The British composer and performer William D. Drake has written songs for his bands and projects as well as releases as a solo artist. Classically trained at piano until he was 18, Drake joined the punk and progressive rock-influenced cult band Cardiacs in 1983, where his virtuoso piano and melodic skills accompanied the textures of band leader Tim Smith to create multi-layered sound that attracted a devoted following. Several of Cardiacs' most "lovingly layered, emotionally potent and poetic" songs emerged during Drake's time in the band. "I Hold My Love In My Arms" featured music which Drake had written when he was 15, and he wrote the opening bars of "The Everso Closely Guarded Line" after having spent eleven years at boarding-school.

In the early 1980s, Drake and Smith both wrote extraneous music which did not go on Cardiacs records. They worked with Smith's then-wife Sarah on the side-project Mr and Mrs Smith and Mr Drake, where Drake for the first time displayed his "weird music hall folk dirges, recalling ancient May Day celebrations and summer equinoxes, employing piano and synthetic keys to unfold his tales". Later using the name the Sea Nymphs, the trio showcased a gentler side to Drake and Smith's songwriting, in contrast with Cardiacs. The albums contain "many of Drake's most endearingly odd and sepia-tinted songs", which include "The Collar", "Dog Eat Spine", "Summer Is-a-Coming In" and "To My Piano from Mr Drake". Smith and Drake were described by Louder Than War as "arguably the most creative songwriting team of a generation", and the legacy of their music has been compared to the partnership of Lennon and McCartney from the Beatles. Drake amicably left Cardiacs in 1990, with the band's "playfully anarchic spirit" featuring in his subsequent solo work.

The short-lived band Lake of Puppies was an outlet for Drake's solo work after leaving Cardiacs, with the band's Lake of Puppies EP released in 2024. Drake's 2007 album Briny Hooves was an eclectic release with a nod to the High Llamas, the Associates and the Beatles, while Yew's Paw, a simultaneously released collection of piano miniatures with a "light classical" veneer, showcased Drake's pastoral roots. The 2023 EP Write to Be features Drake's song "Where Do You Go", produced by Mieko Shimizu.

== Songs ==
All information is sourced from the liner notes of the releases, except where noted.

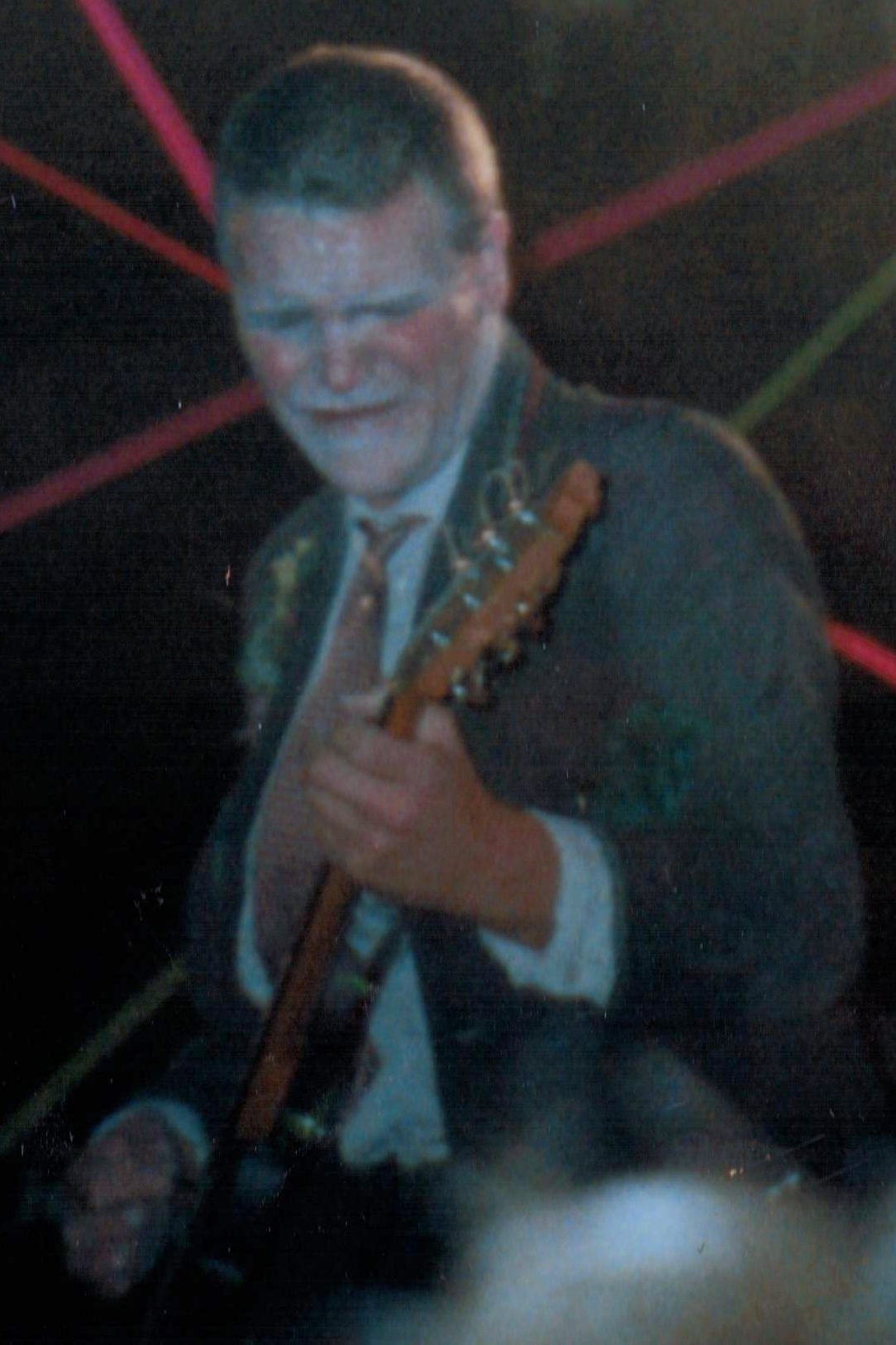
Drake and Tim Smith co-wrote several songs for the groups Cardiacs and The Sea Nymphs.

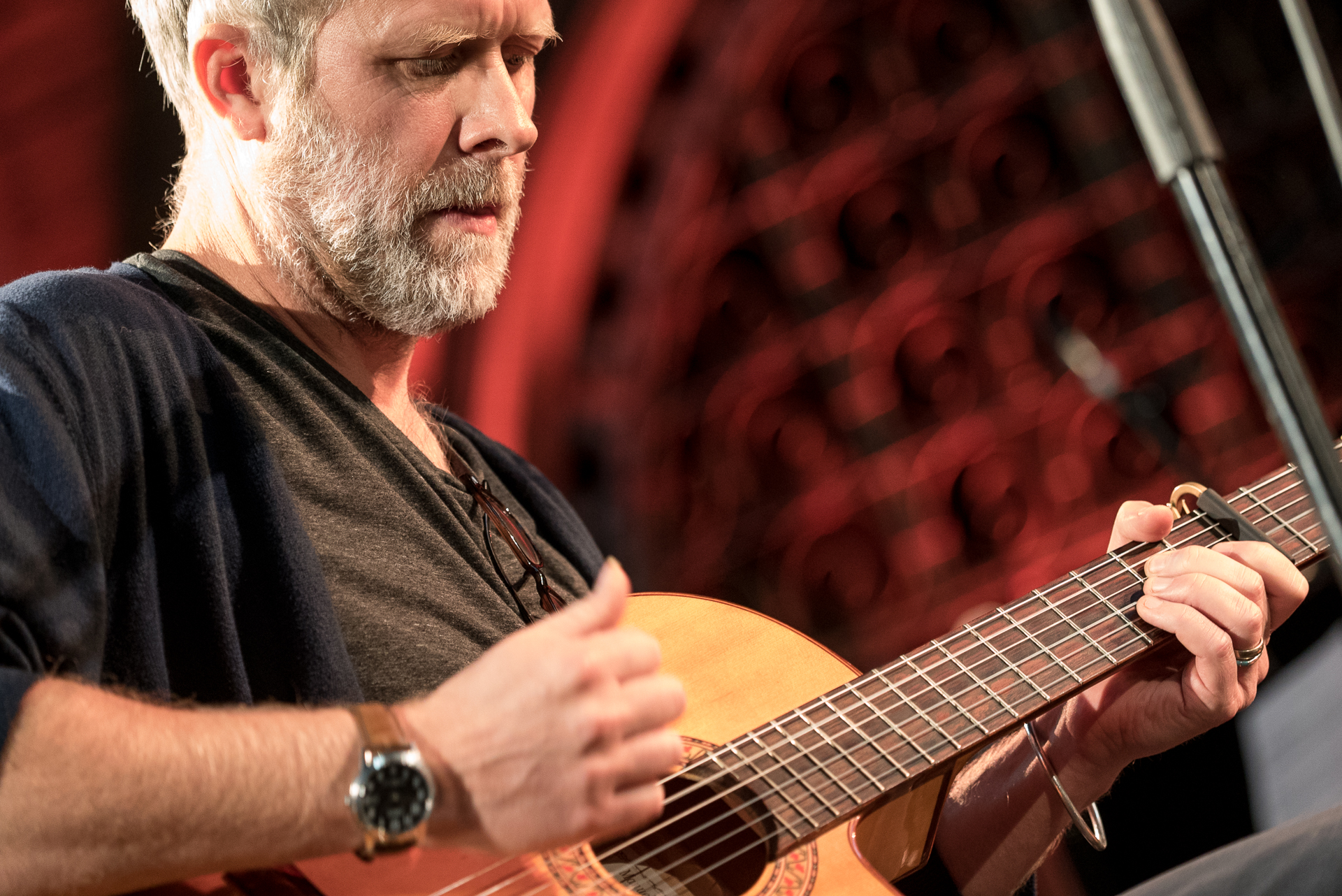
Craig Fortnam arranged Drake's compositions "Mimnermus in Church", "Bill's March" and "Harbour Wall" for the North Sea Radio Orchestra.

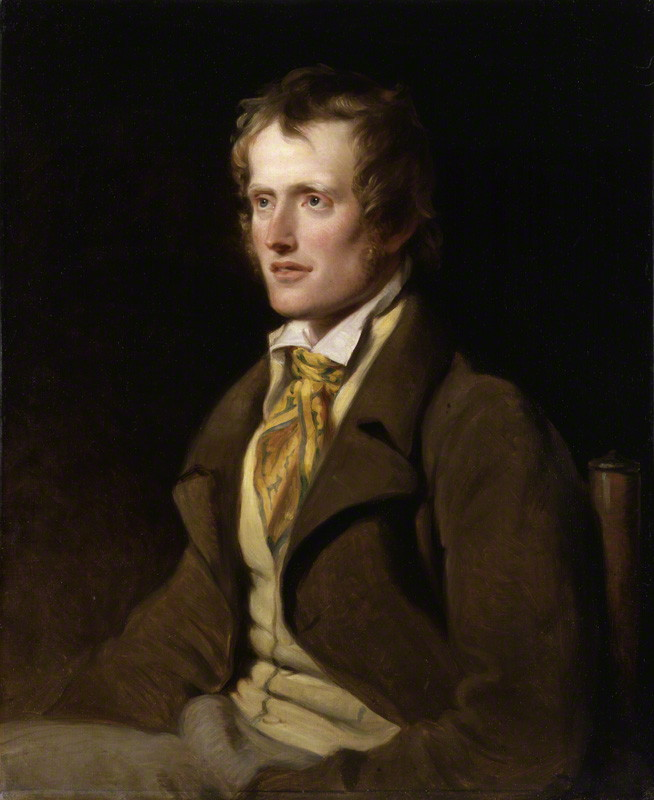
Five songs on Moulded by Industry (2026) feature lyrics by John Clare.

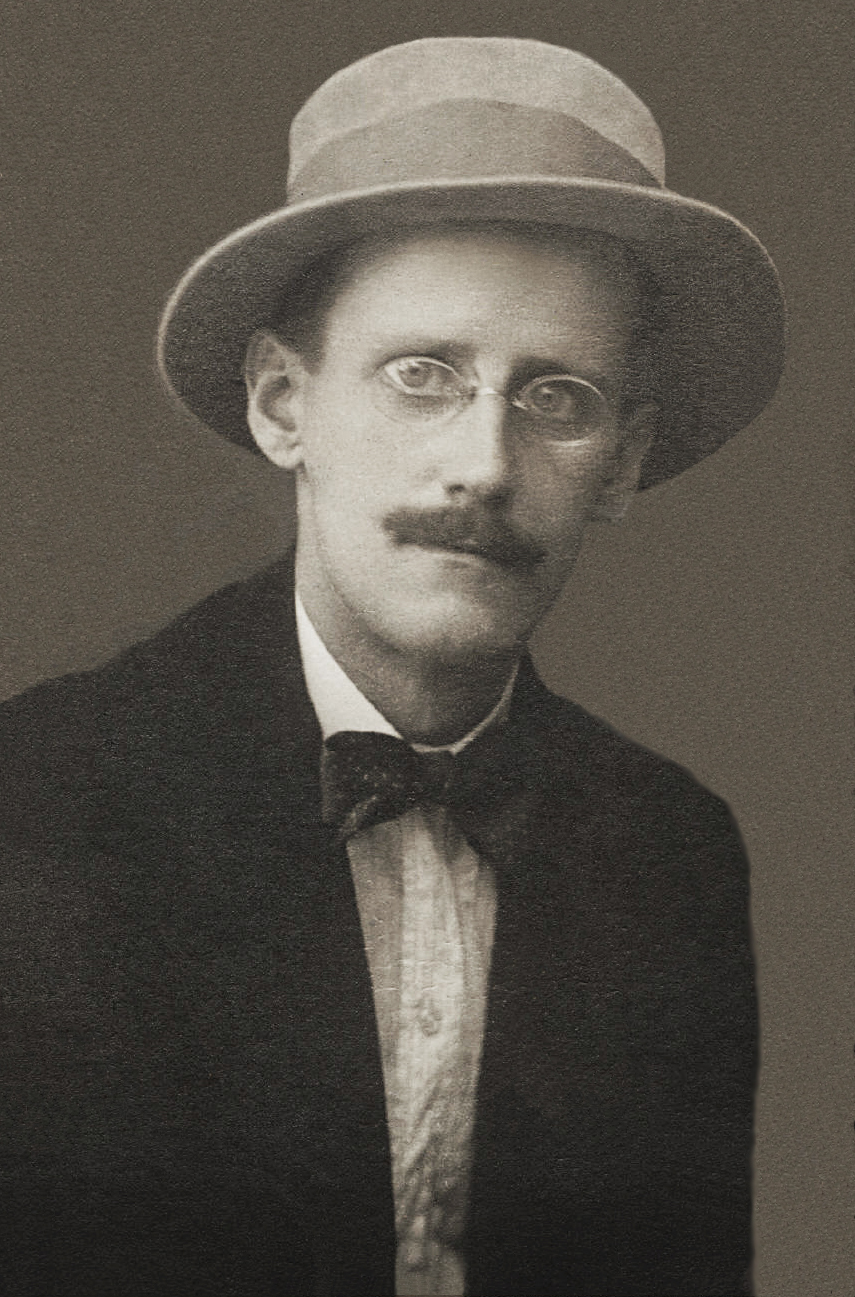
The lyrics for Drake's 2011 songs "Laburnum" and "Bond of the Herd" are by James Joyce.

List of songs, showing writer(s), release(s), and year of original release
Song	Artist	Writer(s)		Release(s)	Year
Song	Artist	Music	Words	Release(s)	Year
"59 Seconds"	Nervous	Nervous		Son of the Great Outdoors	1996
"Abade"	The Sea Nymphs	William D. Drake	Tim Smith	The Sea Nymphs	1992
"Airly Beacon"	William D. Drake	William D. Drake		William D. Drake	2003
"Anchors Away"	The Sea Nymphs	William D. Drake	Instrumental	On the Dry Land	2016
"Ant Trees"	William D. Drake	William D. Drake		The Rising of the Lights	2011
"At the End of the Harbour Wall"	William D. Drake	William D. Drake	Instrumental	Yew's Paw	2007
"Be Here Steryear"	William D. Drake	William D. Drake		Revere Reach	2015
"Bill's March"	North Sea Radio Orchestra	William D. Drake arr. Craig Fortnam	Instrumental	North Sea Radio Orchestra	2006
"The Black Blooded Clam"	The Sea Nymphs	William D. Drake		On the Dry Land	2016
"The Blind Boy"	William D. Drake	William D. Drake	Colley Cibber	Revere Reach	2015
"Blind in Safety and Leafy in Love"	Cardiacs	William D. Drake; Tim Smith		"Susannah's Still Alive"; Songs for Ships and Irons; Sampler	1988
"Bliss Again"	William D. Drake	William D. Drake	John Clare	Moulded by Industry	2026
"Blow'n' the Roof"	Nervous	Nervous		Son of the Great Outdoors	1996
"Bond of the Herd"	William D. Drake	William D. Drake	James Joyce	Believers Roast Presents: The Central Element	2011
"Cameras"	Cardiacs	Tim Smith; William D. Drake; Mark Cawthra		Cardiacs Live	1988
"Castaway"	William D. Drake	William D. Drake	Annie Dachinger	Revere Reach	2015
"The Catford Clown"	William D. Drake	William D. Drake		Revere Reach	2015
"Clack Dance"	William D. Drake	William D. Drake	Instrumental	Revere Reach	2015
"Close Your Eyes"	Nervous	Nervous		Son of the Great Outdoors	1996
"The Collar"	Mr and Mrs Smith and Mr Drake	William D. Drake		Mr and Mrs Smith and Mr Drake	1984
"Cooper Union Blue"	Nervous	Nervous		Son of the Great Outdoors	1996
"Da-Da-Da"	Nervous	Nervous		Son of the Great Outdoors	1996
"Dark Ecstasies"	William D. Drake	William D. Drake	Rupert Brooke	Briny Hooves	2007
"Distant Buzzing"	William D. Drake	William D. Drake	Jamie Kelsey-Fry	Revere Reach	2015
"Distant Hills"	William D. Drake	William D. Drake	John Clare	Moulded by Industry	2026
"Dog Eat Spine"	The Sea Nymphs	William D. Drake	Tim Smith	The Sea Nymphs	1992
"The Donkey Song"	Lake of Puppies	William D. Drake		Lake of Puppies	2024
"Dragonfly"	William D. Drake	William D. Drake		William D. Drake	2003
"The Everso Closely Guarded Line"	Cardiacs	William D. Drake; Tim Smith		On Land and in the Sea; Sampler	1989
"Father's Son"	Nervous	Nervous		Son of the Great Outdoors	1996
"Fidelité"	Lake of Puppies	William D. Drake	Pontus de Tyard	Lake of Puppies	2024
"Fiery Pyre"	William D. Drake	William D. Drake		Cardiacs and Affectionate Friends; William D. Drake	2001
"The Flickering Shade"	William D. Drake	William D. Drake	Thomas Ashe	"The Flickering Shade" Moulded by Industry	2024
"The Fountains Smoke"	William D. Drake	William D. Drake		Briny Hooves	2007
"Freedom and Love"	William D. Drake	William D. Drake (Note: Credited to Drake/Campbell on the "Melancholy World" single.)		"Melancholy World"; William D. Drake	2002
"Glassy I"	William D. Drake	William D. Drake	Instrumental	Yew's Paw	2007
"God's Box"	The Sea Nymphs	William D. Drake	Tim Smith	The Sea Nymphs; Appealing to Venus EP	1992
"Good to Be Meek"	William D. Drake	William D. Drake		William D. Drake	2003
"The Great Adventurer"	William D. Drake	William D. Drake		William D. Drake	2003
"Green Shadows"	William D. Drake	William D. Drake	John Clare	Moulded by Industry	2026
"Harbour Wall"	North Sea Radio Orchestra	William D. Drake arr. Craig Fortnam	Instrumental	Birds	2008
"Heart of Oak"	William D. Drake	William D. Drake	David Garrick	Revere Reach	2015
"Homesweet Homestead Hideaway"	William D. Drake	William D. Drake		The Rising of the Lights	2011
"A Husk"	William D. Drake	William D. Drake		Revere Reach	2015
"I Hold My Love in My Arms"	Cardiacs	William D. Drake; Tim Smith		"Baby Heart Dirt"; On Land and in the Sea; All That Glitters Is a Maresnest	1989
"I'm Coming Up in My Submarine"	Mieko Shimizu featuring William D. Drake	Mieko Shimizu; William D. Drake (co.)		I Bloom	2019
"I'm Eating in Bed"	Cardiacs	Tim Smith; William D. Drake		Rude Bootleg "Is This the Life"; A Little Man and a House and the Whole World Window (Note: Extra track on 1988 Torso CD version and included on subsequent CD and digital releases only)	1986
"In an Ideal World"	William D. Drake	William D. Drake		The Rising of the Lights	2011
"In Converse"	William D. Drake	William D. Drake	J.M.Synge	Revere Reach	2015
"Ivy Dun"	William D. Drake	William D. Drake		William D. Drake	2003
"January Night"	William D. Drake	William D. Drake	Thomas Hardy	Briny Hooves	2007
"Joseph on the Road"	Nervous	Nervous		Son of the Great Outdoors	1996
"Kiln"	William D. Drake	William D. Drake	Instrumental	Earthy Shrine	2008
"The Kissing Song"	William D. Drake	William D. Drake	Instrumental	Yew's Paw; Earthy Shrine	2007
"Laburnum"	William D. Drake	William D. Drake	James Joyce	The Rising of the Lights	2011
"Large Life"	The Lake of Puppies	William D. Drake	Sharron Saddington (Note: Credited to Sharron Fortnam on the Lake of Puppies EP)	Cardiacs and Affectionate Friends (as "Largelife") "Melancholy World"; Lake of Puppies	2001
"Lazy Light"	Mieko Shimizu featuring William D. Drake	Mieko Shimizu; William D. Drake (co.)		"Lazy Light"; I Bloom "Lazy Light" (Mike Lindsay remix)	2019
"Lifeblood"	William D. Drake	William D. Drake		Revere Reach	2015
"Liferaft"	William D. Drake	William D. Drake	Instrumental	Revere Reach	2015
"Lists of Clay"	William D. Drake	William D. Drake		William D. Drake	2003
"Louisville or Ugly Ol' Vase"	William D. Drake	William D. Drake	Instrumental	Yew's Paw	2007
"Love in an Overcoat"	William D. Drake	William D. Drake		William D. Drake	2003
"Love in the Universe"	William D. Drake	William Drake		"Love in the Universe"; Moulded by Industry	2023
"Mare's Nest" (Note: Often written without an apostrophe in physical releases when not handwritten)	Cardiacs	William D. Drake; Tim Smith		On Land and in the Sea; Greatest Hits	1989
"The Mastodon"	William D. Drake	William D. Drake		The Rising of the Lights	2011
"Me Fish Bring"	William D. Drake	William D. Drake		The Rising of the Lights; Moulded by Industry	2011
"Me I'm Different"	Nervous	Nervous		Son of the Great Outdoors	1996
"Melancholy World"	William D. Drake	William D. Drake		"Melancholy World"; Briny Hooves	2002
"Miaow Miaow"	William D. Drake	William D. Drake		William D. Drake	2003
"Mimnermus in Church"	North Sea Radio Orchestra	William D. Drake arr. Craig Fortnam	William Johnson Cory	North Sea Radio Orchestra	2006
"Mirmaid's Purse"	The Sea Nymphs	William D. Drake	Instrumental	On the Dry Land	2016
"Mr Drake's Big Heart"	The Sea Nymphs	William D. Drake	Instrumental	The Sea Nymphs	1992
"Mr Drake's Big Heart Reprise"	The Sea Nymphs	William D. Drake	Tim Smith	The Sea Nymphs	1992
"My Ancestors"	Nervous	Nervous		Son of the Great Outdoors	1996
"Nil in the Nest"	The Sea Nymphs	William D. Drake	Tim Smith	The Sea Nymphs	1992
"Old Care"	William D. Drake	William D. Drake		William D. Drake	2003
"Old No. 9 (The Pusher)"	Nervous	Nervous		Son of the Great Outdoors	1996
"On the Dry Land"	The Sea Nymphs	William D. Drake	Tim Smith	On the Dry Land	2016
"Orlando"	William D. Drake	William D. Drake		Revere Reach	2015
"Ornamental Hermit"	William D. Drake	William D. Drake		The Rising of the Lights	2011
"Pacman"	William D. Drake	William D. Drake		William D. Drake	2003
"Paradox"	William D. Drake	William D. Drake		William D. Drake	2003
"Piano Interlude"	The Sea Nymphs	William D. Drake	Instrumental	The Sea Nymphs	1992
"Pipistrelle"	William D. Drake	William D. Drake	Instrumental	Yew's Paw	2007
"The Perfect Crime"	William D. Drake	William D. Drake		William D. Drake	2003
"Poor John"	William D. Drake	William D. Drake		William D. Drake	2003
"Porn Angels"	Nervous	Nervous		Son of the Great Outdoors	1996
"The Psalm of Life"	The Sea Nymphs	William D. Drake	Henry Wadsworth Longfellow (Note: On earlier releases, the lyrics of "The Psalm of Life" are uncertainly credited to William Wordsworth.)	The Sea Nymphs	1992
"Quivvy Vivvy"	William D. Drake	William D. Drake		William D. Drake	2003
"Ralspark"	William D. Drake	William D. Drake	Instrumental	Yew's Paw	2007
"Requiem for a Snail"	William D. Drake	William D. Drake		Briny Hooves	2007
"Revere Reach"	William D. Drake	William D. Drake		Revere Reach	2015
"The Rising of the Lights"	William D. Drake	William D. Drake		The Rising of the Lights	2011
"The Sea Ritual"	The Sea Nymphs	William D. Drake	George Darley	On the Dry Land	2016
"Sea Snake Beware"	The Sea Nymphs	William D. Drake	Tim Smith	On the Dry Land	2016
"Seahorse"	William D. Drake	William D. Drake		Briny Hooves	2007
"The Seashell Song"	William D. Drake	William D. Drake		Briny Hooves	2007
"Serendipity Doodah"	William D. Drake	William D. Drake		Briny Hooves; Earthy Shrine	2007
"'Short and Sweet Like a Donkey's Gallop'"	William D. Drake	William D. Drake	Instrumental	Yew's Paw	2007
"Sister to the Night"	William D. Drake	William D. Drake; Pinkney		Earthy Shrine	2008
"Sky in Yer Lap"	William D. Drake	William D. Drake		William D. Drake	2003
"A Song for Europe"	Stephen Evens	Caroline Gilchrist; Stephen Gilchrist; William D. Drake		Here Come the Lights	2024
"Song in the Key of Concrete"	William D. Drake	William D. Drake		The Rising of the Lights	2011
"Stables"	Nervous	Nervous		Son of the Great Outdoors	1996
"Stone Carnation"	William D. Drake	William D. Drake	Instrumental	Yew's Paw	2007
"The Storm"	William D. Drake	William D. Drake	John Clare	Moulded by Industry	2026
"Summer Is-a-Coming In"	Mr and Mrs Smith and Mr Drake	William D. Drake		Mr and Mrs Smith and Mr Drake	1984
"Super Altar"	William D. Drake	William D. Drake		The Rising of the Lights	2011
"Sweet Peace"	William D. Drake	William D. Drake	Samuel Spree	Briny Hooves	2007
"Sylvie's Proof"	William D. Drake	William D. Drake	Instrumental	Yew's Paw	2007
"Tarred and Feathered"	Cardiacs	Tim Smith; William D. Drake		Rude Bootleg; Big Ship; Cardiacs Live; On Land and in the Sea (unlisted Torso CD extra track); Songs for Ships and Irons; All That Glitters Is a Maresnest; Sampler	1986
"Then a Rainbow"	Nervous	Nervous		Son of the Great Outdoors	1996
"A Thousand Strokes and a Rolling Suck"	The Sea Nymphs	William D. Drake	Tim Smith	The Sea Nymphs	1992
"To My Piano from Mr Drake"	Mr and Mrs Smith and Mr Drake	William D. Drake		Mr and Mrs Smith and Mr Drake	1984
"Todonkin"	William D. Drake	William D. Drake	Instrumental	Yew's Paw	2007
"Turtledove"	William D. Drake	William D. Drake	Anon	Moulded by Industry	2026
"Ubi Sum"	William D. Drake	William D. Drake	Instrumental	Yew's Paw	2007
"Ugly Fortress"	William D. Drake	William D. Drake	Ernest Hill	Briny Hooves	2007
"A Vision"	William D. Drake	William D. Drake	John Clare	Moulded by Industry	2026
"Where Do You Go"	William D. Drake	William D. Drake arr. Mieko Shimizu		Write to Be	2023
"The Whole World Window"	Cardiacs	Tim Smith; William D. Drake		Rude Bootleg; A Little Man and a House and the Whole World Window	1986
"Wholly Holey"	William D. Drake	William D. Drake		The Rising of the Lights	2011
"Within My Skull"	William D. Drake	William D. Drake	Instrumental	Yew's Paw	2007
"Wolves"	William D. Drake	William D. Drake		Briny Hooves	2007
"Yew's Paw"	William D. Drake	William D. Drake	Instrumental	Yew's Paw	2007
"Ziegler"	William D. Drake	William D. Drake	Instrumental	The Rising of the Lights	2011
