= That Is All =

That Is All may refer to:

- That Is All (book), a 2011 book by John Hodgman
- That Is All (film), a 2019 film written and directed by Mark Weeden
- "That Is All" (song), a 1973 song by George Harrison

== See also ==
- That's All (disambiguation)
