= That's It =

That's it may refer to:

- That's It!, a 1961 album by American jazz saxophonist Booker Ervin
- That's It!, a 2013 album by Preservation Hall Jazz Band
- That's It!, debut studio album by Ricky Skaggs
- "That's It", song by the Cars as the B-side of the single "Let's Go"
- "That's It", song by Mr Bishi, produced by Lisa Pin-Up
- "That's It", song by Bebe Rexha from the album All Your Fault: Pt. 2
- "That's It", song by Gotthard from their self-titled debut album
- "That's It (I'm Crazy)", song by Sofi Tukker
- "¡That's It! (Ya Estuvo)", American title for the single "Ya Estuvo" by Kid Frost from the album Hispanic Causing Panic
- "That's It", a song by Future and Lil Uzi Vert in their 2020 album Pluto x Baby Pluto

== See also ==
- This Is It (disambiguation)
- That's All (disambiguation)
