= Day Is Gone =

1991 single by Cardiacs

Single by Cardiacs

from the album Heaven Born and Ever Bright
- A-side: "No Bright Side"
- B-side: "Ideal"; "Joining the Plankton"
- Released: 28 October 1991
- Studio: Boundary Row Studios (London); Studio 811 (Cowfold)
- Genre: Power pop
- Length: 3:19
- Label: Alphabet Business Concern
- Songwriter: Tim Smith
- Producer: Tim Smith

Cardiacs singles chronology
"Baby Heart Dirt" (1989)	"Day Is Gone" (1991)	"Bellyeye" (1995)

Music video
- "Day Is Gone" on YouTube

"Appealing to Venus"
- Front sleeve of the original release

Single by the Sea Nymphs

from the album The Sea Nymphs
- B-side: "Tree Tops High"
- Released: 1 June 1998 (reissue)
- Studio: Tree Tops High (Snakey Wood, Surrey); Sea Views (Anglesey)
- Length: 2:35
- Label: Alphabet Business Concern (original); Org (reissue)
- Songwriter: Tim Smith
- Producer: The Sea Nymphs

Alternative cover
- Organ EP reissue

"Day Is Gone" is a song by English rock band Cardiacs from their third studio album, Heaven Born and Ever Bright (1992). It was released as a twelve-inch single preceding the album on 28 October 1991 alongside a free 7-inch titled "Appealing to Venus" (b/w "Tree Tops High") by side project the Sea Nymphs from their eponymous debut studio album (1992). Both tracks were written by Tim Smith who solely produced the former, while the Sea Nymphs produced the latter. Musically, "Day Is Gone" has been described as a power pop song with a 5/4 time signature and prominent guitars.

A low-budget music video for "Day Is Gone" was released on MTV, featuring various shots of the band in a forest. After being reissued by the Organ magazine's record label, Org Records, "Appealing to Venus" was made BBC Radio 1's daytime Single of the Week and led to the Sea Nymphs recording a Peel Session

== Background and composition ==
The classic Cardiacs six-piece lineup dissipated following the release of On Land and in the Sea (1989), with William D. Drake, Tim Quy and Sarah Smith leaving the band. Cardiacs slimmed down to a four piece on their third studio album Heaven Born and Ever Bright (1992), which displayed a harder edged, metal-leaning sound. Tim Smith, Jim Smith and drummer Dominic Luckman remained, joined by guitarist Christian "Bic" Hayes. Hayes left the band before the song's release to commit to his other project Levitation and was replaced by Jon Poole.

"Day Is Gone" was composed and written by Tim Smith, utilising a 5/4 time signature. It was recorded at Boundary Row Studios in London and Studio 811 in Cowfold, Sussex. (Note: Erroneously written as "Cowfield" in the 2015 reissue liner notes.) The song was also produced and mixed by Smith, with regular collaborator David Murder as the sound engineer. Its guitars have been described as having a power pop element with spacious production.

== Release and promotion ==
"Day Is Gone" was released as a single preceding Heaven Born and Ever Bright on 28 October 1991. The EP includes the B-sides "No Bright Side", "Ideal" and "Joining the Plankton", a concert favourite. Future Cardiacs guitarist Kavus Torabi mentions in his book Medical Grade Music that he got his nose pierced the same week as the EP's release. The single's cover features a moth and a daisy montage, which was also used on a T-shirt. A low-budget music video for the song was released on MTV. During the video, various shots of the band in a forest are shown.

=== "Appealing to Venus" ===
The song "Appealing to Venus" by Cardiacs side project the Sea Nymphs was released for free as a 7-inch single with copies of the "Day Is Gone" twelve-inch, backed with the B-side "Tree Tops High". The song was written by Smith and produced by the Sea Nymphs, comprising Tim, Sarah and Drake. Org Records, the record label of the magazine Organ, reissued "Appealing to Venus" on 1 June 1998 as a CD-only EP. The label had previously released the Cardiacs single "Bellyeye" and featured both bands on various compilations and gigs. As there was a dislike of Cardiacs in the mainstream music business, Org neglected to mention that the release was a reissue and that the Sea Nymphs members were in another band. They sent a pre-release tape to DJs including John Peel, who said he loved the single and asked if they could do a radio session. Mark Radcliffe and Mark Riley made "Appealing to Venus" their daytime Single of the Week on BBC Radio 1, which Organ says was "probably the most exposure since the days of 'Is This the Life?'."

The Sea Nymphs snuck around the BBC Maida Vale studio attempting to not be recognised, and recorded the Peel Session with string machines and other equipment. John Peel, who wasn't there, called up the following day to say that he was pleased and mentioned that he knew who the band members were weeks later. Because of the single's radio play, labels called wanting to sign the band and Org asked for more tracks to release, but Smith had moved on and had begun work on Cardiacs' Guns (1999).

== Critical reception ==
Dom Lawson of Classic Rock called the single "irresistibly melodic", including "Day Is Gone" in the playlist Cardiacs: The Essential Playlist. Marco Sgrignoli of Ondarock commented that might contain "the most 'straight' 5/4 in history". According to Organ, the reissue of "Appealing to Venus" received positive words in the press from the same people who never had a good printed word for Cardiacs.

== Cover versions ==
The Trudy covered the "Day Is Gone" on the tribute album Leader of the Starry Skies: A Tribute to Tim Smith, Songbook 1 (2010). In 3:AM Magazine, Cathi Unsworth wrote that the Trudy "spring through the [song's] cascading melodies." Sam Sheppard of The Line of Best Fit said that "The Trudy bring their sunkissed pop to 'Day Is Gone', accentuating the fact that Cardiacs, despite all the fiddly bits are basically a damn fine pop band."

== Formats and track listings ==
All tracks are written by Tim Smith. All lyrics by Smith, except where noted.

"Day Is Gone"

- 12-inch vinyl

A1. "Day Is Gone" – 3:19
A2. "No Bright Side" (Smith, Christian Hayes) – 5:15
B1. "Ideal" – 4:24
B2. "Joining the Plankton" – 3:42

- CD and digital EP
1. "Day Is Gone" – 3:19
2. "No Bright Side" – 5:15
3. "Ideal" – 4:24
4. "Joining the Plankton" – 3:42

"Appealing to Venus"

- 7-inch vinyl

A. "Appealing to Venus" – 2:35
B. "Tree Tops High" – 2:30

- Organ EP reissue
1. "Appealing to Venus" – 2:36
2. "God's Box" – 1:48
3. "Up In Annies Room" – 3:33
4. "Shaping the River" – 2:04
  - Bonus tracks
5. "Little Creations" – 1:56
6. "Camouflage" – 3:51
7. "Hymn" (hidden track; music begins at 2:28) – 4:56

Notes

- The music of "God's Box" is by William D. Drake.
- "Little Creations" and "Camouflage" are taken from Mr and Mrs Smith and Mr Drake (1984).
- "Hymn" is a hand-held tape recording of Cardiacs at the 1984 Stonehenge Free Festival.

== Credits and personnel ==
=== "Day Is Gone" ===
Credits adapted from the folded insert of the CD digipak.

Cardiacs

- Jim Smith – bass guitar, vocals
- Tim Smith – guitar, vocals
- Christian Hayes – guitar, vocals
- Dominic Luckman – drums, vocals

Production

- David Murder – engineering
- Roger Tebbutt – acoustic liaison
- Tim Smith – production

=== "Appealing to Venus" ===
Credits adapted from the liner notes of The Sea Nymphs.

Personnel

- William D. Drake – vocals, keyboards, Television Organ
- Tim Smith – vocals, keyboards, guitars
- Sarah Smith – vocals, saxophones, clarinet, recorders
- The Sea Nymphs – percussion, production
