= Tim Quy =

British percussionist (1961–2023)

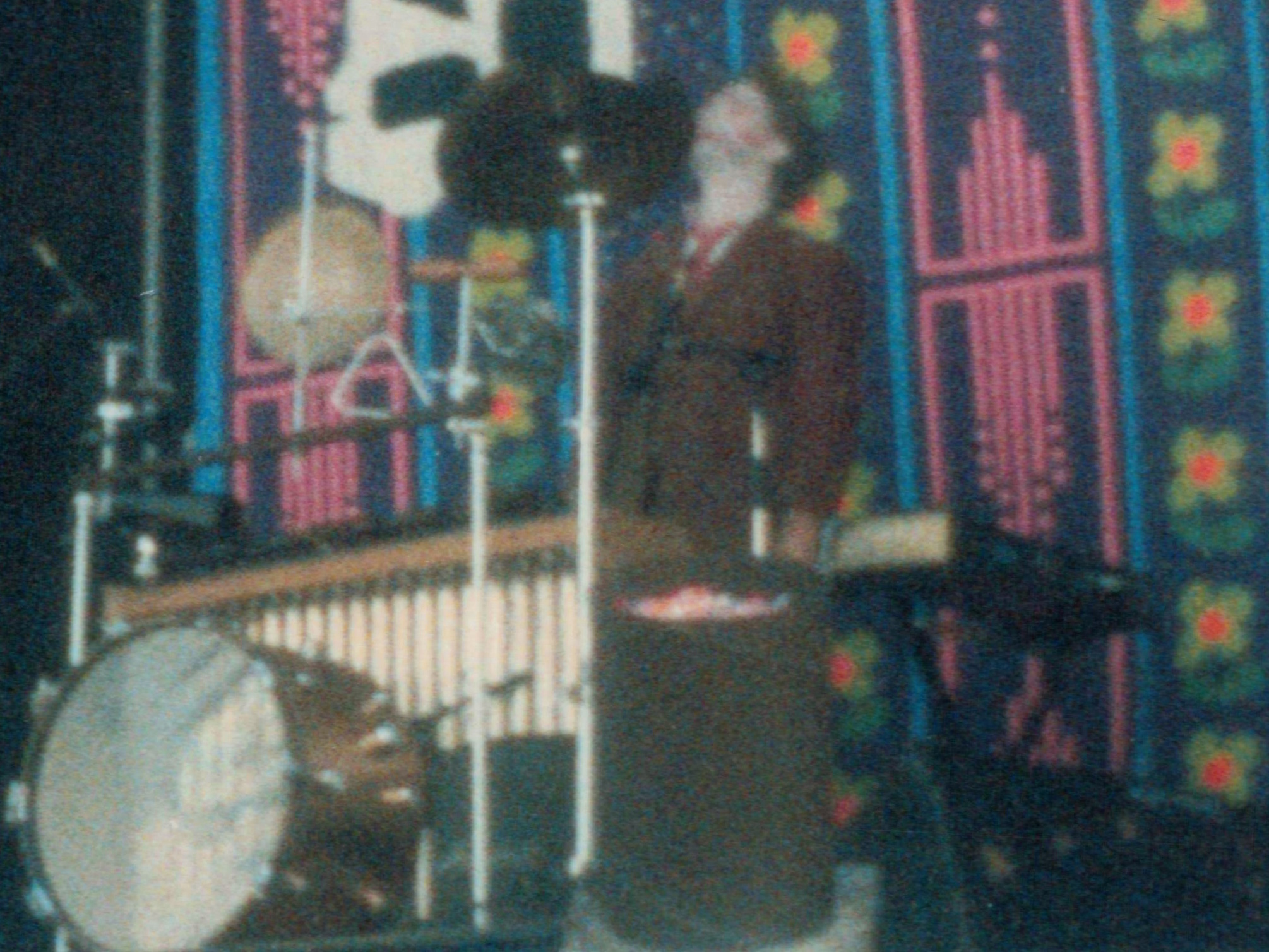
- Cardiacs at Reading Rock Festival 1986

Background information
- Born: Timothy Graham Quy; 14 August 1961; Brixton, London, England
- Died: 2 February 2023 (aged 61)
- Occupations: Musician; consultant; analyst; property developer
- Instruments: Percussion; keyboards; bass
- Years active: 1980–2023
- Formerly of: Cardiacs
- Spouse: Marnie Brocklehurst (m. 1989)

Timothy Graham Quy (/kwaɪ/ KWY; 14 August 1961 – 2 February 2023) was a British musician, best known as the percussionist for the rock band Cardiacs from 1981 to 1990. Initially the band's sound engineer, Quy first gigged as reserve bass player in 1980 and joined full-time on percussion in 1981. He became a key part of the band's classic six-piece lineup, performing on all their releases from The Seaside (1983) to On Land and in the Sea (1989), and was a popular face in the UK underground. Quy's last performance with Cardiacs was documented in the live video All That Glitters Is a Mares Nest (1992), where his marimba figures particularly high in the mix.

From 2020, several crowdfunding campaigns were created to help Quy through a series of health problems. In 2023, it was announced that Quy had died, prompting reactions from music outlets and Cardiacs members. For performances since 2024, Craig Fortnam of North Sea Radio Orchestra took over Quy's role as percussionist and covers his parts.

== Career ==
Quy began his career as Cardiacs' sound engineer, lighting technician and roadie alongside future drummer Dominic Luckman. He first gigged with Cardiacs, then called Cardiac Arrest, as reserve bass player for Jim Smith at Snoopies, Richmond in 1980. After Toy World (1981), Quy joined the band's live lineup as a synthesizer player and percussionist. He subsequently joined the band full-time as their percussionist, performing on their demo The Seaside (1983), the first release on their own label the Alphabet Business Concern. According to Eric Benac, his "madman percussion" featuring cowbells and marimbas adds depth to a handful of tracks including "Jibber and Twitch", "Hello Mr Sparrow", "It's a Lovely Day" and "Hope Day". During shows, Quy and William D. Drake played grinning madmen as the band's driving mythology became more pronounced.

By 1983, Quy played percussion and keyboards in a semi-stable lineup with Tim Smith on guitar and lead vocals, Jim on bass and vocals, Drake on keyboards, Sarah Smith on saxophone and Luckman on drums, which would later be remembered as the band's classic lineup. Cardiacs' single "Big Ship" (1987) and debut studio album A Little Man and a House and the Whole World Window (1988) were recorded with the lineup, which was expanded for the latter to include strings and a brass section. The track "A Little Man and a House" features Quy's factory-like percussion. For its follow-up, On Land and in the Sea (1989), Quy's work on "The Leader of the Starry Skies" was regarded as "supportive and effective" by Benac; the album's closing track, "The Everso Closely Guarded Line", features blasts of bashing percussion. A key part of the idiosyncratic band, Quy was a popular face on the UK underground. According to Uncut, he "enliven[ed] the band's controlled chaos with marimba, xylophone, cowbells, China cymbals and keyboards."

Quy's contributions of bass guitar and percussion for an unnamed instrumental side project were released on the compilation Archive Cardiacs in 1989. The first of the previously unreleased tracks, "Piffol Four Times", features tuned percussion melodies similar to mid-career Frank Zappa. On "Piffol One Time", Quy's bass plays a rhythmic role alongside Tim Smith's guitar, which both start with a pounding tempo. "Piffol Three Times", features Quy's tuned percussion and bass work mimicking a clock, which becomes nimble as the band progresses into faster-paced sections.

After On Land and in the Sea, the classic six-piece lineup dissipated. The last concert in which the lineup was complete, alongside guitarist Christian Hayes, took place on 30 June 1990 at the Salisbury Arts Centre. As Cardiacs shared the same management with Mitch Harris' grindcore band Napalm Death, who were scheduled to shoot a performance the same day, Cardiacs took advantage of the crew's presence and recorded the live album and film All That Glitters Is a Mares Nest (1992). According to Marco Sgrignoli of Ondarock, the video is an opportunity to fully grasp the importance of the percussion element as Quy's marimba, though not framed, figures particularly high in the mix. Quy and Sarah Smith never played live with the band again. After the concert, he left to pursue other projects but remained friendly with the band.

== Personal life ==
Timothy Graham Quy was born on 14 August 1961 in Brixton, London, England. In 1989, he married property developer Marnie Brocklehurst in Stroud. Quy later resided in Ilfracombe. His occupations included IT consultant and analyst, and property developer over four company appointments. His enthusiasm for Cardiacs never diminished, and he would tell stories about his time in the band for posterity. At the end of All That Glitters Is a Mares Nest, a message flashes up saying "This film is dedicated to Tim Quy who left our world 30/6/90" to commemorate Quy's departure. This tricked many people into thinking he had died.

== Illness and death ==
In 2020, a JustGiving crowdfunding campaign was created by Paul Ashby to help Quy deal with the expense of living after a cancer diagnosis two years prior, and various other illnesses leaving him unable to work. It was funded on 12 May 2020, having raised £6,040 of its £10,000 stretch target. On 14 August 2021, Ashby arranged a prize draw for Quy's birthday which raised £3,540 in 12 days. Another JustGiving campaign for a collection to buy Quy grapes, flowers and body armor after he broke his pelvis and femur was funded on 31 October 2021 and raised £3,752.

I’m so sorry to inform you, dear friends, that our little soldier, Tim Quy, passed away this morning. Needless to say, it breaks my heart to pass this on but I’m sure you will all raise a glass to the lad. Here’s to Mr. Quy. Sorely missed.

— Jim x

On 2 February 2023, a post was published on the Cardiacs shop's Facebook page in which Mary Wren, the manager of the Alphabet Business Concern, announced that Quy had died that day. She subsequently tweeted a similar message. The news of his death was announced on the Cardiacs website by bassist Jim Smith. An image of Quy was added to the website's home page as a tribute. He was 61 years old.

The announcement of his death was reported by music outlets such as Organ, Louder Than War and Uncut, whose writers expressed their condolences and admiration for him. Cardiacs members Kavus Torabi and William D. Drake also expressed similar feelings online. Audio of Quy rehearsing "Piffol One Time" on bass was uploaded to YouTube by Michael Chapman. Quy's funeral was public for any fans to attend, being held at North Devon Crematorium on 17 March 2023. The funeral was livestreamed for those who could not attend in person. Following Quy's death, A Little Man and a House and the Whole World Window was reissued, which Stephen Dalton of Uncut noted "inescapably feels like a memorial" to Quy. To celebrate the life of Tim Smith and Quy, the 2024 Sing to Tim gigs reunited former members of Cardiacs and friends as well as Tim Smith's Spratleys. Craig Fortnam, leader of the North Sea Radio Orchestra and other projects, joined the band as a percussionist, taking over the role originally held by Quy. With Cardiacs, Fortnam covered Quy's parts, and Quy's face was shown on the screen behind the band.

== Discography ==
=== With Cardiacs ===
According to Eric Benac, except where noted:

Albums

- Toy World (1981) (live sound and Barclaycard)
- The Seaside (1983)
- Big Ship (1987)
- A Little Man and a House and the Whole World Window (1988)
- Archive Cardiacs (1989)
- On Land and in the Sea (1989)
- Songs for Ships and Irons (1991)

Singles

- "Seaside Treats" (1985)
- "There's Too Many Irons in the Fire" (1987)
- "Is This the Life" (1988)
- "Susannah's Still Alive" (1988)
- "Night Tracks (The Janice Long Sessions)" (1988)
- "Baby Heart Dirt" (1989)

Live albums

- Rude Bootleg (1986)
- Cardiacs Live (1988)
- All That Glitters Is a Mares Nest (1995)

=== As featured artist ===
- The Whole World Window II (2018) (featured on "The Alphabet Business Concern" by Noel C. Storey)
