= If This Is It =

If This Is It may refer to:

- "If This Is It" (Huey Lewis and the News song), 1984
- "If This Is It" (Newton Faulkner song), 2009
- "If This Is It" (Degrassi:The Next Generation episode), television episode from 2008

== See also ==
- This Is It (disambiguation)
