= The Sea Nymphs (album) =

- Artwork of the original 1992 cassette release

Studio album by the Sea Nymphs
- Released: 1992 (Note: Apple Music indicates a release year of 1991.) (promo); 1995 (reissue)
- Recorded: 1992
- Studio: Tree Tops High (Snakey Wood, Surrey); Sea Views (Anglesey)
- Genre: Psychedelic pop; avant-garde folk
- Length: 46:47
- Label: All My Eye and Betty Martin Music (promo); Alphabet Business Concern (reissue)
- Producer: The Sea Nymphs

The Sea Nymphs chronology
Mr and Mrs Smith and Mr Drake (1984)	The Sea Nymphs (1992)	On the Dry Land (2016)

Singles from The Sea Nymphs
- 1. "Appealing to Venus" Released: 28 October 1991

The Sea Nymphs is the self-titled debut studio album by the English psychedelic folk band the Sea Nymphs, an offshoot of the rock band Cardiacs featuring Tim Smith, Sarah Smith and William D. Drake. It was originally released as a limited edition promotional cassette by All My Eye and Betty Martin Music in 1992 and was reissued on CD via Cardiacs' label the Alphabet Business Concern in 1995.

The Sea Nymphs was recorded at Tree Tops High and Sea Views in 1992 and was self-produced by the band, initially under the title Tree Tops High. Offering a gentler side of Tim Smith's creative output, it was preceded by the single "Appealing to Venus" (b/w "Tree Tops High") in 1991, which came free with the Cardiacs single "Day Is Gone" and led to the band recording a Peel Session when it was reissued by Org Records in 1998.

== Background and recording ==
Members of the English rock band Cardiacs—Tim Smith, Sarah Smith and William D. Drake—formed an offshoot called Mr and Mrs Smith and Drake, releasing a cassette of the same name in 1984. In 1991, it was announced in a Cardiacs YOUsletter that the band had changed their name to the Sea Nymphs and that another cassette album would soon be available.

The album was recorded in 1992 along with the Sea Nymphs' second album, On the Dry Land (2016), at Tree Tops High in Snakey Wood, Surrey and Sea Views in Anglesey. It was self-produced by the Sea Nymphs, and initially took the title Tree Tops High before its release.

== Composition ==
The Sea Nymphs is a mixture of psychedelic pop, avant-garde folk, English Hymnal and electronic experimentation, with hints of dancehall and classical influence. Taking a different musical approach to the prog-punk japery of Cardiacs material, less time signature changes and more conventional song structures were used, offering a gentler side of Tim Smith's creative output. Music critics have compared the album to the whimsy of the Dukes of Stratosphear, the psychedelic folk of the Incredible String Band and the work of classical English composer Ralph Vaughan Williams, as well as the second side of Popol Vuh's In den Gärten Pharaos,

"The Spirit Spout" has a percussive opening which settles into a sparser, hymn-like tone, and "Nil in the Nest" features oom-pah brass with an ascending guitar and church organ. "Lucky Lucy" features diaphanous keyboards. "Up In Annie's Room" has E-mu Proteus derived strings and a resonating church organ sound. "Dog Eat Spine" is a surreal track with scampering piano mimicking the movement of small canine legs, and "Sarah on a Worm" resembles a curio music box melody. The spacious composition of "Lilly White's Party" is dotted with birds twittering and a meowing cat.

== Release and promotion ==
To promote The Sea Nymphs, the album's release was preceded by the 7-inch single "Appealing to Venus" (b/w "Tree Tops High"), which came free with the Cardiacs twelve-inch "Day Is Gone". A year later, The Sea Nymphs was released as a limited edition promotional cassette by All My Eye and Betty Martin Music in 1992, available through the Cardiacs fan club. In the autumn of 1992, the Sea Nymphs were announced to be supporting All About Eve on tour. A significant contingent of Cardiacs fans attended the first gig at Nottingham Rock City, where Tim Smith squirted the audience with water as he did with Cardiacs.

After "Christ Alive" appeared on the Cardiacs anthology Sampler, the Alphabet Business Concern saved the tape copies of The Sea Nymphs from disintegration by releasing it on CD in 1995, allowing it for sale to the band's grateful fanbase. The album was subsequently reissued on digipak CD and 180 gram vinyl in 2016 alongside the release of On the Dry Land, and released on Apple Music and Bandcamp. Org Records, the record label associated with the Organ fanzine, reissued "Appealing to Venus" as a seven-track single in 1998, resulting in the band recording a John Peel Session.

== Track listing ==
All lyrics are written by Tim Smith, except where noted.

No.	Title	Music	Length
1.	"The Spirit Spout"	Smith	2:20
2.	"Shaping the River"	Smith	2:07
3.	"Nil in the Nest"	William D. Drake	1:53
4.	"A Thousand Strokes and a Rolling Suck"	Drake	2:18
5.	"Christ Alive"	Smith	3:24
6.	"Mr Drake's Big Heart" (instrumental)	Drake	0:17
7.	"Lucky Lucy"	Smith	2:23
8.	"Gods Box"	Drake	1:54
9.	"Piano Interlude" (instrumental)	Drake	0:44
10.	"Up in Annie's Room"	Smith	3:37
11.	"Mr Drake's Big Heart Reprise"	Drake	0:17
12.	"The Psalm of Life" (Henry Wadsworth Longfellow^{[a]})	Drake	2:37
13.	"In the Corner of Sin"	Smith	2:38
14.	"Tree Tops High"	Smith	2:36
15.	"Dog Eat Spine"	Drake	2:51
16.	"Sarah on a Worm" (instrumental)	Smith	2:46
17.	"Lilly White's Party"	Smith	5:14
18.	"Appealing to Venus"	Smith	2:33
19.	"Abade"	Drake	4:18
Total length:			46:47

Notes

- "When all these songs have ended, listen very carefully and you can just about hear Sarah playing 'Sarah on a Worm' on a real worm."
- "Gods Box" is written "God's Box" (with an apostrophe) in the lyrics insert.
- ^{^[a]} On earlier releases, the lyrics of "The Psalm of Life" are uncertainly credited to William Wordsworth.

== Personnel ==
Credits are adapted from the liner notes of The Sea Nymphs.

- William D. Drake – vocals, keyboards, Television Organ
- Tim Smith – vocals, keyboards, guitars
- Sarah Smith – vocals, saxes, clarinet, recorders
- all the Nymphs bang things
- Produced by The Sea Nymphs
