= This Is It =

This Is It may refer to:

== Literature ==
- This Is It (novel), a 1996 novel by Joseph Connolly
- This Is It, a 1956 novel by Hal Ellson

== Music ==
=== Albums ===
- Michael Jackson's This Is It (album) or the title song (see below), 2009
  - This Is It (concert residency), a 2009–2010 planned series of concerts
  - Michael Jackson's This Is It, a 2009 film documenting Jackson's rehearsals for the concerts
- This Is It (Jack Ingram album), 2007
- This Is It (Jimmy Ibbotson album), 1999
- This Is It (Melba Moore album) or the title song (see below), 1976
- This Is It: The Best of Faith No More, 2003
- This Is It: The Very Best Of, by Dannii Minogue, 2013
- This Is It! (The A&M Years 1979–1989), by Joe Jackson, 1997
- This Is It, by Bride, 2003
- This Is It!, by Betty Davis, 2005
- This Is It! (Bob Newhart album), 1967
- This Is It, by Six, 2002

=== Songs ===
- "This Is It" (Kenny Loggins song), 1979
- "This Is It" (Jim Reeves song), 1965
- "This Is It" (Melba Moore song), 1976; covered by Dannii Minogue, 1993
- "This Is It" (Michael Jackson song), 2009
  - "This Is It", an unreleased song recorded by Michael Jackson, unrelated to the above, 1984
- "This Is It" (Ryan Adams song), 2004
- "This Is It" (Scotty McCreey song), 2018
- "This Is It" (Staind song), 2009
- "This Is It", by Billy Preston from That's the Way God Planned It, 1969
- "This Is It", by Innosense from So Together, 2000
- "This Is It", by Jay and the Americans, 1962
- "This Is It", by Lo Moon from Lo Moon, 2018

== Television ==
- This Is It (TV series), a 2016–2017 Nigerian drama series
- This Is It, a 1960s Australian variety program on ATV
- "This Is It", the theme song of The Bugs Bunny Show
- "This Is It", the theme song of the 1970s American sitcom One Day at a Time
- "This Is It" (One Day at a Time episode), the first episode of the 2017 One Day at a Time remake

== Other ==
- This Is It! (bar), the oldest continually operating gay bar in Wisconsin, US
- This Is It Collective, a group of filmmakers best known for creating the Don't Hug Me I'm Scared series

== See also ==
- Diz Iz It!, a 2010 Philippine variety show
- This Is It and I Am It and You Are It and So Is That and He Is It and She Is It and It Is It and That Is That, a 2008 album by Marnie Stern
- If This Is It (disambiguation)
