= That Is All (film) =

2019 Canadian romantic drama film

- Theatrical film poster
- Directed by: Mark Weeden
- Written by: Mark Weeden
- Produced by: Mark Weeden; Craig Wood
- Starring: Joel Ballanger; Al Braatz
- Cinematography: Craig Wood
- Edited by: Craig Wood
- Music by: Sam Kochany
- Release dates: September 14, 2019 (TIFF); October 24, 2020 (Forest City); June 8, 2021 (USA)
- Running time: 107 mins.
- Country: Canada
- Language: English

That Is All is a 2019 Canadian LGBTQ+ independent romantic drama film, written and directed by Mark Weeden. The film stars Joel Ballanger and Al Braatz. It premiered at the Toronto International Film Festival in 2019.

== Synopsis ==
Struggling with loneliness as he turns 30, Ryan's life takes an unanticipated turn after meeting Sam, his friend's boyfriend. Their deepening rapport prompts Ryan's journey of self-acceptance.

== Cast ==
- Joel Ballanger as Ryan
- Al Braatz as Sam
- Sara Hinding as Maya
- Daniel Bossenberry as Paul
- Carly Fawcett as Vanda
- Dan Tait Brown as Brad

== Reception ==
Pip Ellwood-Hughes of Entertainment Focus praised the performances: "The performances of Joel Ballanger and Al Braatz are what make the film. Ballanger in particular is excellent as Ryan and he really brings to life a character that is struggling but refuses to admit it." Christopher Velasco of Letterboxd gave the film 1.5/5 stars, chiding the film's wish fulfillment: "Was this wish fulfillment? Yes, it was. I know plenty of gay men who would LOVE to get a 'straight' guy and that's just getting laid. That happens all the time. Now, being coupled or married and becoming friends with a 'straight' guy then he falling for you. COME ON!"
