= That's All =

That's All may refer to:

== Albums ==
- That's All (Bobby Darin album), 1959
- That's All (Mel Tormé album), 1965
- That's All (Tete Montoliu album), 1985
- That's All!, by Sammy Davis Jr., 1967
- That's All, by Twice as Much, 1968

== Songs ==
- "That's All" (1938 song), by Sister Rosetta Tharpe; a cover of "Denomination Blues" by Washington Phillips (1927)
- "That's All" (1952 song), written by Alan Brandt and Bob Haymes; first recorded by Nat King Cole (1953), covered by many performers
- "That's All" (Genesis song), 1983
- "That's All" (Merle Travis song), 1947
- "That's All", by Mr and Mrs Smith and Mr Drake from Mr and Mrs Smith and Mr Drake, 1984
