= The Sea Nymphs (band) =

English psychedelic folk band

- Left to right: Sarah Smith, Tim Smith and William D. Drake

Background information
- Also known as: Mr and Mrs Smith and Mr Drake (1983–1984)
- Origin: Kingston upon Thames, England
- Genres: Psychedelic folk; avant-garde folk; psychedelic pop; classical; chamber
- Years active: 1991–2008; 2015–2016
- Labels: Alphabet Business Concern; All My Eye and Betty Martin
- Spinoff of: Cardiacs
- Past members: Tim Smith; Sarah Smith; William D. Drake

The Sea Nymphs were an English band from Kingston upon Thames, England. The group comprised Cardiacs members Tim Smith, William D. Drake and Sarah Smith. They are commonly regarded as the quieter side of the parent band. Rooted in folk and chamber music, their sound is much lighter than that of their parent outfit. The songs dispense with the use of loud guitars and drums, in favour of differing vocal rhythms, keyboards and brass instruments. However, the music still contains Cardiacs' trademark off-the-wall chord progressions and sudden time changes, albeit in a slightly gentler fashion.

The group formed under the title Mr and Mrs Smith and Mr Drake, (Note: Sometimes written as Mr & Mrs Smith and Mr Drake (with an ampersand)) releasing a self-titled album in 1984. In 1991, group reunited and changed their name to the Sea Nymphs. They made their single debut with "Appealing to Venus" (1991), preceding their eponymous debut album (1992). Tim Smith suffered a cardiac arrest in 2008, limiting his mobility and temporarily causing the group to go on hiatus before returning to the studio in 2015 to complete the Sea Nymphs' second album On the Dry Land (2016).

== History ==
=== Formation and early years (1984) ===
Mr and Mrs Smith and Mr Drake, the band that would eventually become the Sea Nymphs, formed as a side project for Cardiacs. The band recorded their self-titled album around 1983 to 1984. It was released in 1984 through Cardiacs' Alphabet Business Concern label.

=== Renaming and Cardiacs separations (1991–1995) ===
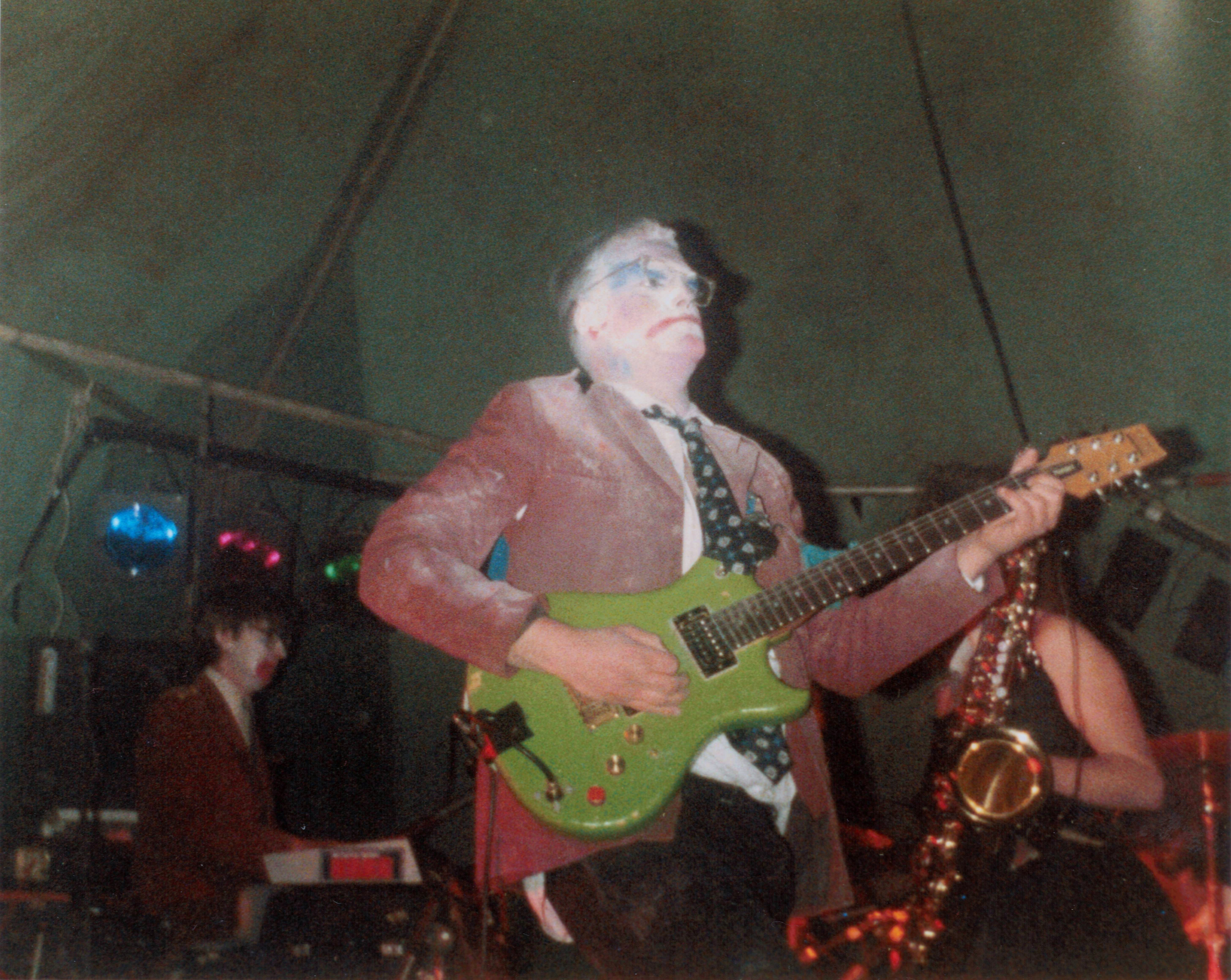
The three members of The Sea Nymphs performing with Cardiacs in 1986

The band announced their reformation and name change in a Cardiacs YOUsletter, releasing the free seven-inch "Appealing to Venus" in 1991 with the Cardiacs twelve-inch single "Day Is Gone". In 1992, they released their eponymous album (originally referred to as Tree Tops High) on cassette, available only through the Cardiacs fanclub. It was eventually released commercially on CD in 1995. After a 1992 tour with All About Eve, the Sea Nymphs rarely gigged, with William D. Drake being replaced by Jon Poole for a couple at the Islington Powerhaus and an Organ special at the Monarch in Chalk Farm.

=== Reissues and radio sessions (1998–2008) ===
ORG Records released a collection of material in 1998. This was the Appealing To Venus EP, which contained the title track from the previous 7", material from the Mr and Mrs Smith and Mr Drake era and a surprise in the form of "Hymn", a Cardiacs song recorded at the 1984 Stonehenge Free Festival. Also in 1998, on 4 October, John Peel invited them on to BBC Radio 1 to record a Peel Session. They recorded the tracks Sea Snake Beware, Eating A Heart Out, Lily White's Party and The Sea Ritual.

In 2004, All My Eye and Betty Martin Music re-released the Mr and Mrs Smith and Mr Drake album onto CD.

On 4 May 2009, the Peel session was re-broadcast as a Classic Session on BBC 6 Music.

=== Reunion and On the Dry Land (2015–present) ===
A second album, On the Dry Land, was recorded around the same time as their debut in the 1990s but remained unreleased until November 2016. Several rough tracks, some bearing different titles, had floated around file sharing spheres in the years leading up to release. Having recovered sufficiently enough from his 2008 heart attack and stroke, Tim Smith was able to return to his studio to complete the album between 2015 and 2016. In an interview, Smith revealed further unreleased Sea Nymphs material is set to see the light of day following On the Dry Land's completion. Smith also stated he was "deeply touched" at the efforts made to help him recover from his accident (such as the release of the Cardiacs tribute album, Leader of the Starry Skies, in which all sales of the album directly funded Smith's rehabilitation), and had made a "pledge to [him]self to get better".

A further interview was conducted with Prog magazine with all three Sea Nymphs members, discussing Tim's health, the creation of On the Dry Land, and the band's history.

== Band members ==
- Tim Smith – vocals, keyboards, guitars, percussion, trumpet on Mr and Mrs Smith and Mr Drake (died 2020)
- William D. Drake – vocals, keyboards, organ, percussion
- Sarah Smith – vocals, saxophone, clarinet, recorder, percussion

Live members

- Jon Poole – keyboards, substitute for Drake (c. 1992)

== Discography ==
- Mr and Mrs Smith and Mr Drake (1984) (as Mr and Mrs Smith and Mr Drake)
- The Sea Nymphs (1992)
- On the Dry Land (2016)
