= William D. Drake =

English musician (born 1962)

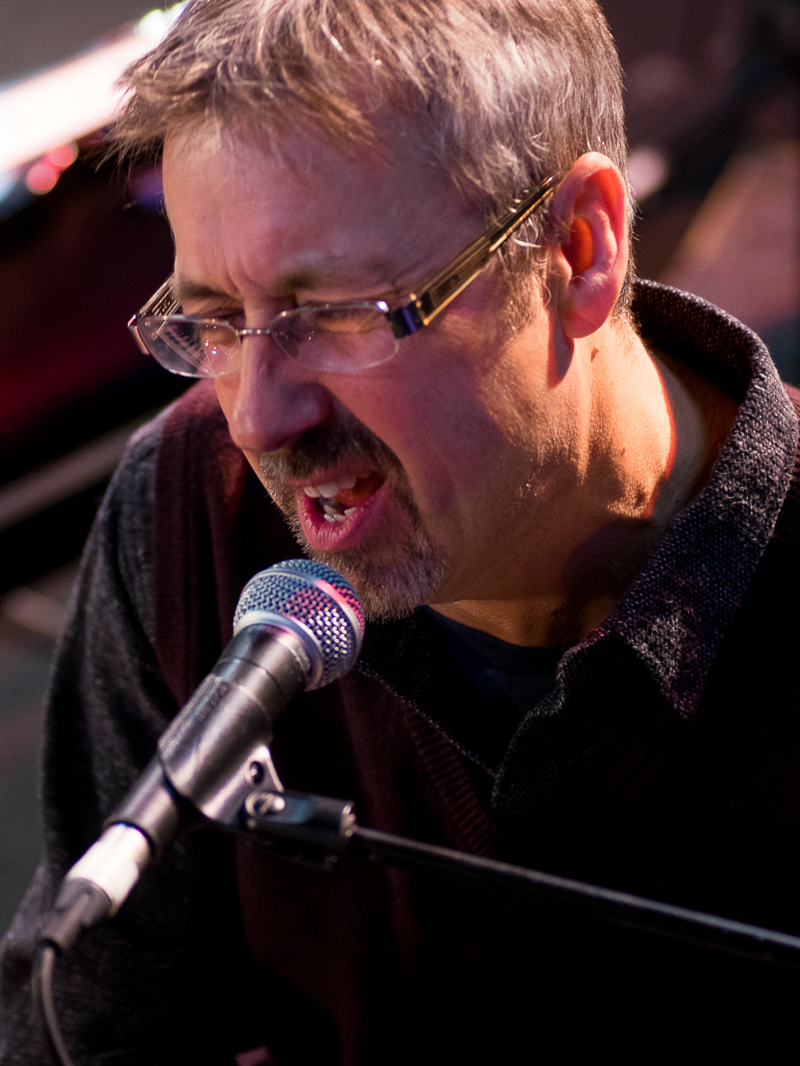
- Drake in 2015

Background information
- Also known as: Bill Drake
- Born: William Derek Drake; 7 February 1962 (age 64); Stock, Essex, England
- Genres: Psychedelic rock; art pop; neo-classical
- Occupations: Musician; composer; singer-songwriter
- Instruments: Vocals; piano; harmonium; organ; mellotron; keyboards
- Works: Songs written
- Years active: 1983–present
- Labels: Super 8; All My Eye And Betty Martin; sheBear; Onomatopoeia; Zebedog
- Formerly of: Honour Our Trumpet; Cardiacs; Mr & Mrs Smith & Mr Drake; The Sea Nymphs; The Grown-Ups; Nervous; Lake of Puppies; Wood; North Sea Radio Orchestra
- Website: williamddrake.com

William Derek Drake (born 7 February 1962) is an English musician, keyboardist, pianist, composer and singer-songwriter. He is a former member of the English rock band Cardiacs, with whom he played for eight years between 1983 and 1991. He has also been a member of the Sea Nymphs, North Sea Radio Orchestra, Nervous, Wood, Lake of Puppies and The Grown-Ups, as well as pursuing a career as a solo artist.

== Biography and career ==
=== Early years ===
William Derek Drake was born on 7 February 1962 in Stock, Essex. He is the second son of Derek Courtenay Drake and Angela (née Webb-Bowen) who was the daughter of Air Vice-Marshal Sir Tom Ince Webb-Bowen. William D. Drake is a second cousin, once removed, of the English singer-songwriter Nick Drake. He first played the harmonium, and began learning the piano at the age of five, training by playing duets with his grandmother before taking formal lessons. He went on to play with bands during his schooldays

On leaving art college, Drake took a telesales job where he met punk singer/trumpet player Little Sue. He played a gig with her band Honour Our Trumpet at The Grey Horse in Kingston-upon-Thames in 1983. The sound engineer for the concert was Tim Smith, the leader of the Kingston-based band Cardiacs, an act with a taste for complex compositions. Intrigued by Drake's skills, Smith wrote out a complicated piece for Drake, who performed it with ease. Smith recruited Drake into Cardiacs, apparently by telling him that he was now a member of the band whether he liked it or not.

=== Work with Cardiacs, The Sea Nymphs & The Grown-Ups (1983–1992, 1998) ===
Drake's first gig with Cardiacs was at The Marquee Club in Wardour Street, London in August 1983, supporting Here & Now. He joined the band towards the end of the recording sessions for their album The Seaside (released in 1984) and consequently only performed on a couple of tracks.

Meanwhile, Drake, Tim Smith and Sarah Smith formed a new band in parallel to Cardiacs, initially called Mr and Mrs Smith and Mr Drake. Whilst the Cardiacs sound was clearly at the core of the new band, the rock guitars and drums were stripped away, replaced with string sounds, chiming and tinkling effects and angelic vocals, with Drake's piano as the central instrument. This was recorded on four-track, for the eponymous 1984 cassette album Mr and Mrs Smith and Mr Drake. It was initially available from the fan club and at Cardiacs gigs, and was eventually released on CD in 2002 by Tim Smith's label All My Eye and Betty Martin Music.

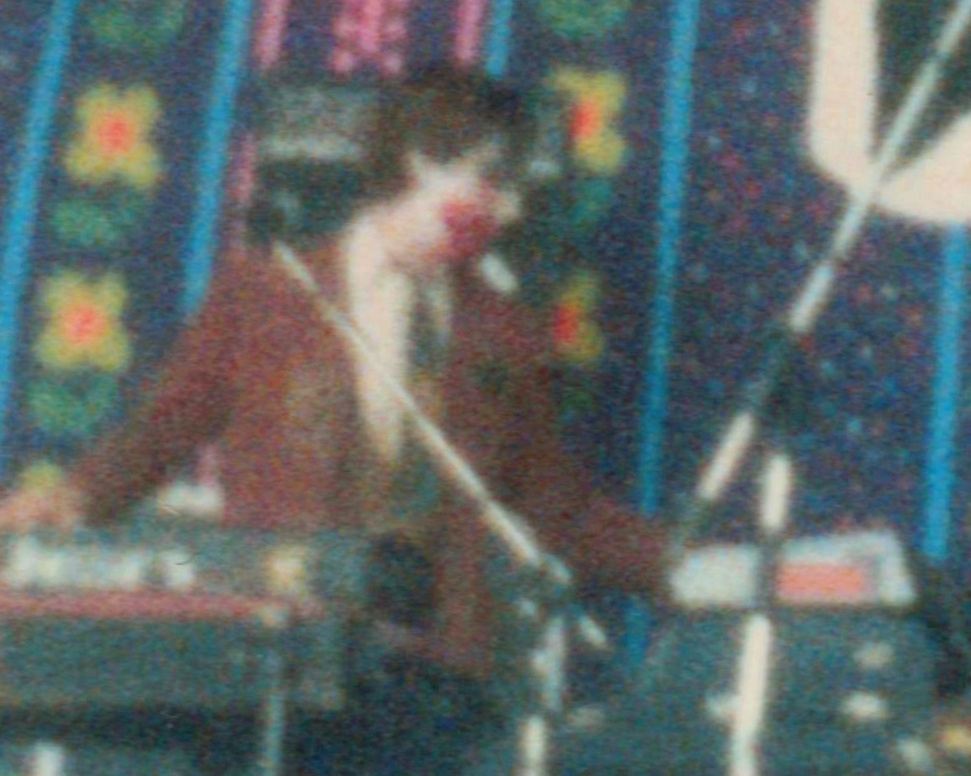
Cardiacs at Reading Festival 1986

Drake was a fully fledged recording member of Cardiacs by the 1985 Cardiacs EP Seaside Treats, and also played on the 1986 Big Ship mini-album and the 1986 Rude Bootleg live album. In 1987, he performed on two Cardiacs 12-inch singles, "There's Too Many Irons in the Fire" and "Is This the Life". Drake also played a major part on the next Cardiacs album, 1988's A Little Man and a House and the Whole World Window for which he co-composed the songs "I'm Eating in Bed" and "The Whole World Window". 1988 also saw the release of another single – the Kinks cover "Susannah's Still Alive", released in 7" & 12" versions – and a BBC Radio 1 sessions EP (Night Tracks (The Janice Long Session)), as well as a second live album called Cardiacs Live.

Drake's compositional role in Cardiacs had increased by the time of the recording of the On Land and in the Sea album in 1989, for which he co-composed four songs – "I Hold My Love in My Arms" (featuring music he'd originally written at the age of fifteen), "The Duck and Roger the Horse", "Mares Nest" and "The Everso Closely Guarded Line". He also appeared on the accompanying "Baby Heart Dirt" 7-and-12" single. In 1990, Cardiacs recorded a live concert in Salisbury in which Drake was part of a seven-piece band. This was released as the Maresnest live video in 1992 and as the live album All That Glitters Is a Mares Nest in 1995. The 1991 Songs for Ships and Irons compilation collected together various EP tracks originally released between 1986 and 1987 (including two songs co-written by Drake, "Tarred and Feathered" and "Blind in Safety and Leafy in Love").

Sometime in the mid-'80s – while still with Cardiacs – Drake formed The Grown-Ups with himself on keyboards and vocals. This was a short-lived project and the first time Drake worked with guitarist/composer Craig Fortnam (with whom he'd later work in Lake of Puppies and North Sea Radio Orchestra). The other band members were the then-current Cardiacs drummer Dominic Luckman and two other former Cardiacs members (keyboard player and co-singer Mark Cawthra and bass player Jon Bastable (from The Trudy and who'd been a backup Cardiac during Cawthra's tenure in the band). The Grown-Ups recorded five songs, which have never been released.

In May 1991, Drake left Cardiacs, believing that he needed a change. He has, however, maintained his links with the band, playing support slots and guesting at various live performances as well as appearing as a guest player on the Heaven Born and Ever Bright track "Helen and Heaven".

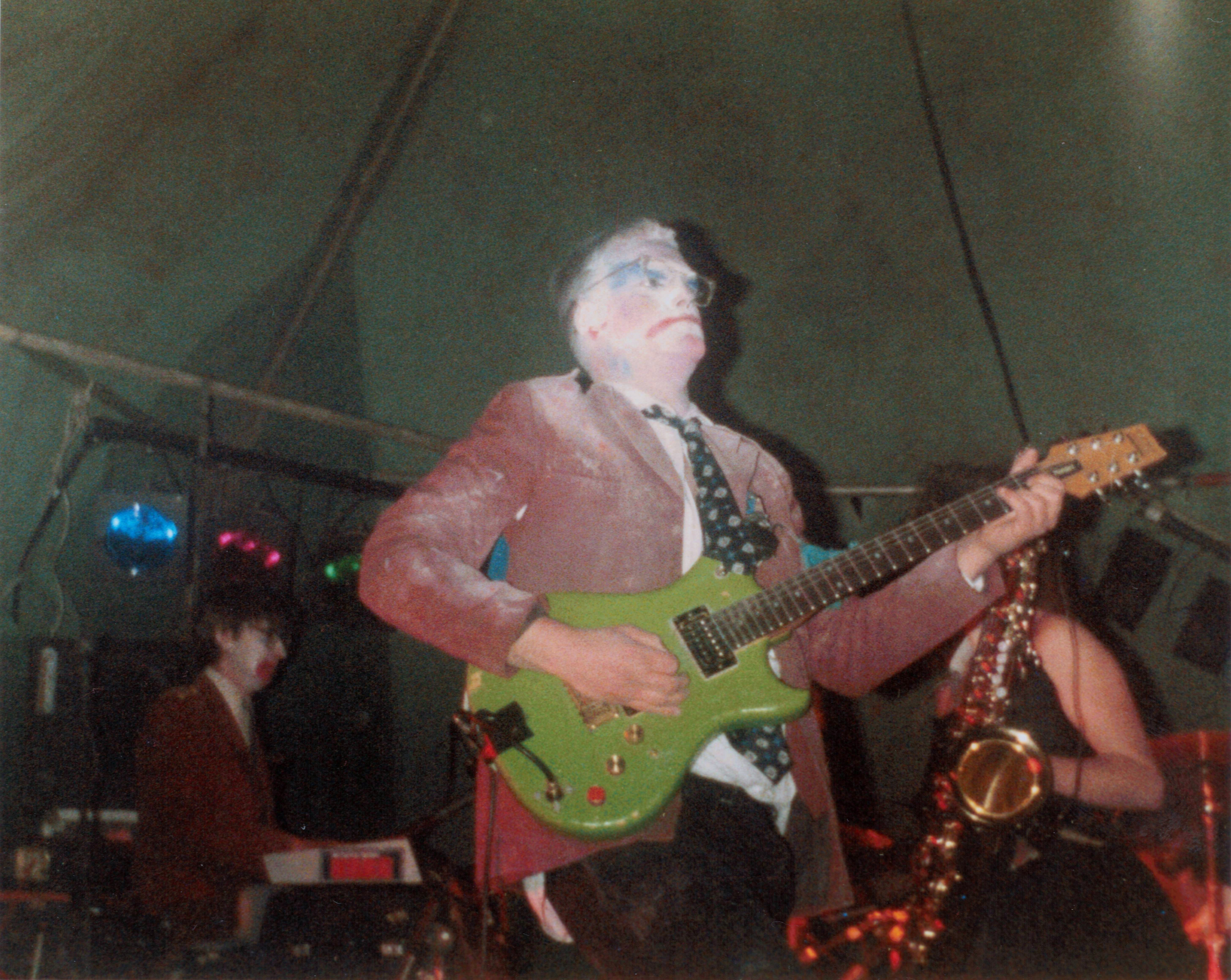
Drake (left) in Cardiacs with Tim and Sarah Smith, 1986

Despite leaving Cardiacs, Drake remained a member of the "Mr and Mrs Smith and Mr Drake" project, which by 1991 had been renamed the Sea Nymphs and had recorded enough material for a new album. A 7" Sea Nymphs single called "Appealing to Venus" was released in 1991, given away free with the first 500 copies of Cardiacs 12" single "Day Is Gone" (it was later made available from the fan-club, and was eventually re-released on CD in 1998 by Org Records with additional material added). The band's eponymous album The Sea Nymphs was initially released on cassette in 1992 and was only available from the Cardiacs fan-club (it was not released on CD until 1995). The Sea Nymphs supported All About Eve on their "Ultraviolet" tour of 1992.

The Sea Nymphs were briefly reactivated in 1998 and reissued their "Appealing to Venus" single on CD. The band played a Radio 1 John Peel Session on 4 October 1998 (performing "Eating A Heart Out", "Lilly White's Party", "The Sea Ritual" and "Sea Snake Beware"), which was re-broadcast as a "classic Peel Session" on BBC Radio 6 on 4 May 2009. Drake had claimed that material for at least one more Sea Nymphs album had been recorded, but that the trio had not yet got round to finishing it off and releasing it, but second album On The Dry Land finally saw a release at the end of 2016.

=== Work with Nervous, Wood and Lake of Puppies (1992–1999) ===
When you're a musician you can learn so much from playing different styles of music, so if people asked me to join them I used to tend to say yes.

— William D. Drake

Soon after leaving Cardiacs Drake teamed up with Dean Gainsburgh-Watkins (bass guitar, formerly of Here & Now), Justin Travis (vocals), Richard "Dicky" Cripps (acoustic guitar), Keith Holden (harmonica), Bernie Holden (clarinet), Oscar O'Lachlainn (electric guitar and drums), Barney Crockford (drums) and Melvin Duffy (pedal steel guitar) to form the folk/country/rock band Nervous. Compared to Cardiacs, Nervous provided a rootsier songwriting style with opportunities for improvisation which appealed to Drake, who took the opportunity to familiarise himself with the Hammond organ and Fender Rhodes electric piano in addition to the pianos, harmoniums and synthesizers which he'd played previously. The band gigged in London regularly (with notable shows at the Royal Albert Hall and Ronnie Scott's) and released an album called Son of the Great Outdoors on Grapevine Records in 1996. Some of the album was recorded in Paul McCartney's Hoghill Studio in Sussex (reportedly, Richard Cripps was in a relationship with Paul's daughter at the time).

Circa 1994 (and while still working with Nervous), Drake formed the band Lake of Puppies. This featured himself on keyboards and vocals, with Sharron Saddington on bass guitar and vocals, Craig Fortnam on nylon-string acoustic guitar and vocals, and Chin Keeler on drums. Drake has professed affection for this band, which gigged frequently (especially in clubs around the Camden area of London), and recorded three songs which remain unreleased. A fourth Lake of Puppies track, "Large Life", appears on the Cardiacs and Affectionate Friends compilation album of 2001. (Sharron Saddington and Craig Fortnam latter married and formed the cross-disciplinary chamber music ensemble North Sea Radio Orchestra, to which Drake contributed.)

On leaving Nervous in 1997 Drake joined country-rockers Wood (a country rock band led by singer-songwriter James Maddock). He remained with the band for two years, playing on six tours of the United States. He also appeared on Wood's only album, 2001's Songs from Stamford Hill (albeit as a guest musician playing keyboards on only one track, "Could I Be").

=== Solo career (2001–present) ===
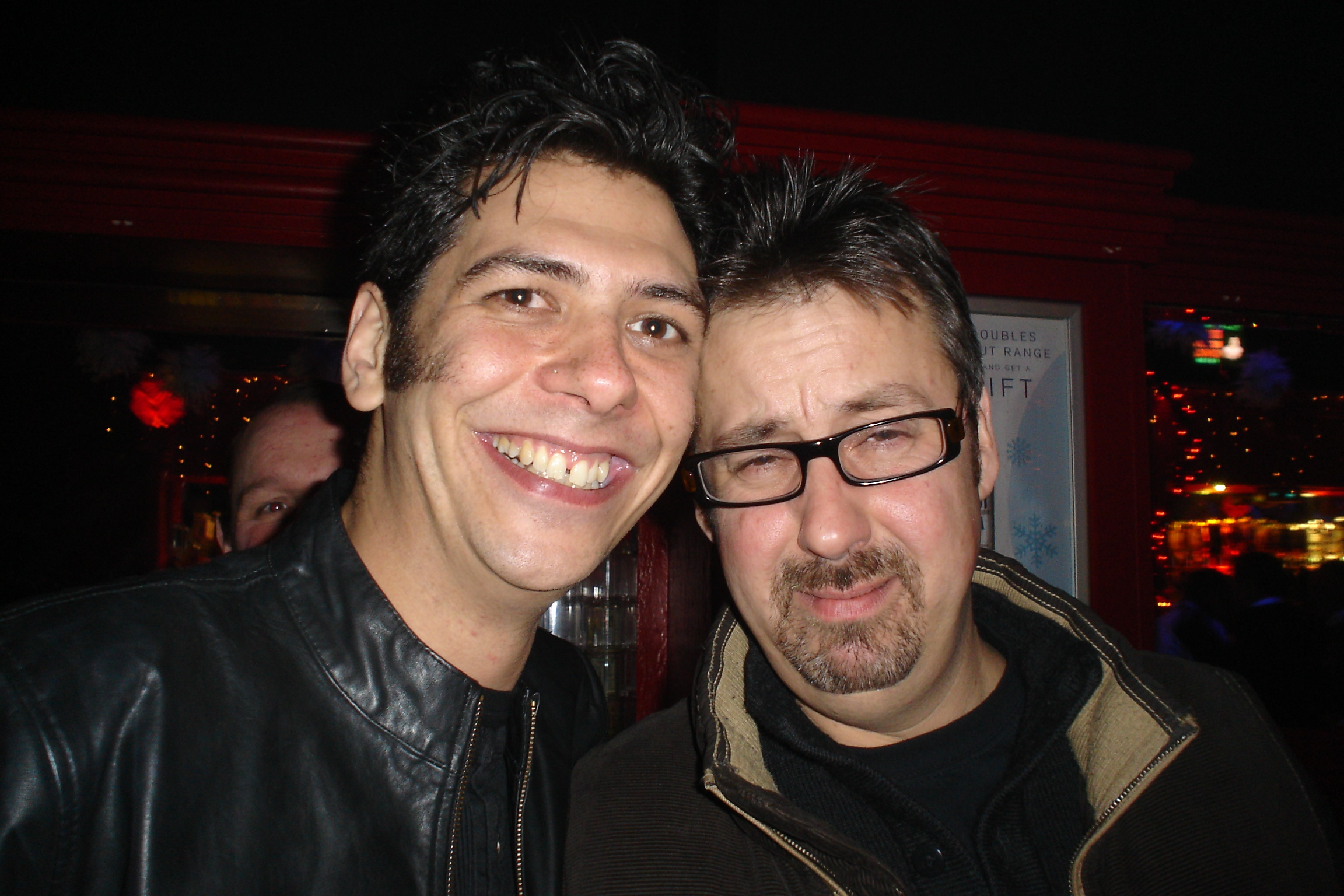
Kavus Torabi and Drake in 2005

By the late 1990s Drake had composed a number of original piano pieces, which Tim Smith then encouraged him to write lyrics for. Smith went on to produce sessions for Drake over the next few years, resulting in the release of the "Melancholy World" single in 2002, followed by Drake's debut solo album William D.Drake which was released on Smith's label All My Eye and Betty Martin Music in 2003. (The song "Fiery Pyre" from this album had also found its way onto the Cardiacs and Affectionate Friends compilation album in 2001.) As gig offers came in Drake put together a live band with a somewhat shifting line-up, the set list depending on which musicians were available. He played at various points over the next five years while working on new material and various projects.

In February 2007, Drake recorded a session for BBC Radio 6 to promote the next stage of his solo career. This consisted of not one but two albums, released simultaneously on two different record labels, both appearing on 5 February 2007.

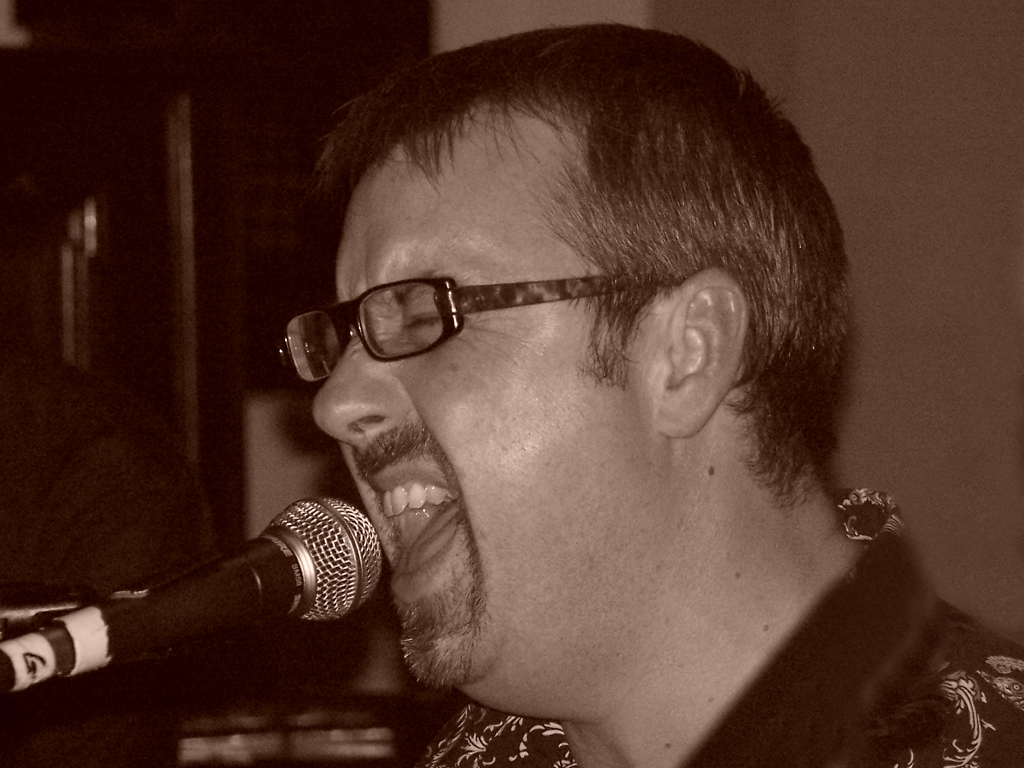
Drake performing in 2008

Briny Hooves (released on sheBear Records) was a more lushly-arranged and orchestrated song-based follow up to William D.Drake, recorded with a multitude of musicians and singers and meeting with considerable critical success. Hi-Fi World called it "a beautifully crafted album of mature, powerful and moody pop songs", while Q Magazine's Tom Doyle commented "(Drake's) frenetic piano-playing inspired Blur, and here the ex-Cardiacs keyboardist turns his own '60s-refracted take on British art-pop: one part Robyn Hitchcock, one part a deeper-voiced Robert Wyatt."

Yews Paw (released on the Onomatopoeia label) was an album of thirteen unaccompanied acoustic piano pieces. All of these were original Drake compositions, although inspirations included classical composers such as Debussy, Rachmaninov, Paderewski, Prokofiev and Hindemith as well as jazz, Walt Disney films and Edward Lear. As with Briny Hooves, the album was well received. John L. Walters reviewed Yews Paw in The Guardian, describing it as "piano miniatures whose 'light classical' veneer peels back to reveal a tough musical heart."

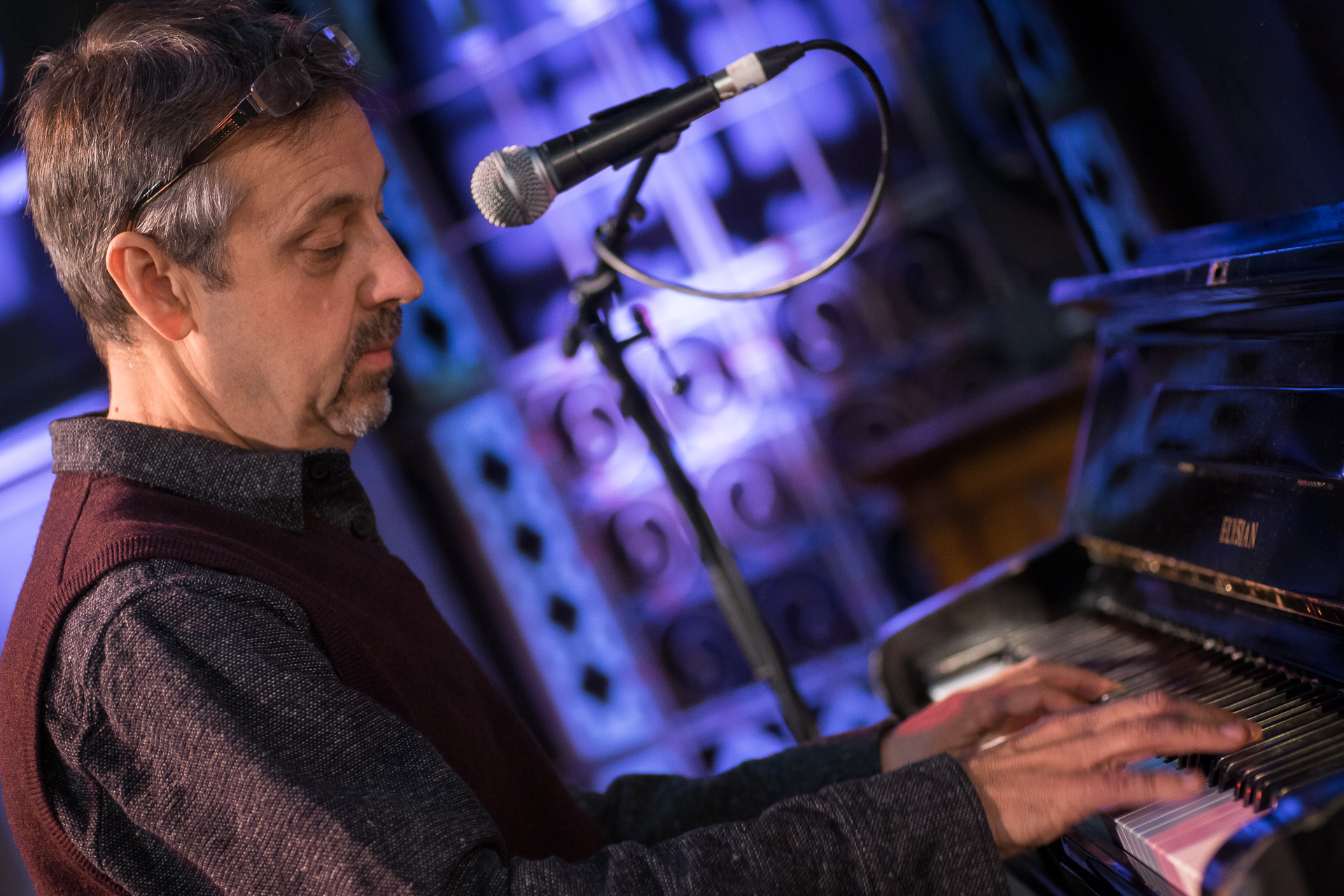
Drake performing in 2015

In December 2010, a William D. Drake cover version of the Tim Smith song "Savour" appeared as the opening track on Leader of the Starry Skies: A Tribute To Tim Smith, Songbook 1, a fundraising compilation album to benefit the hospitalised Smith.

(The original version of the song appeared on Tim Smith's Extra Special OceanLandWorld.) Drake's fourth album The Rising of the Lights was released in spring 2011. It features yet another band line-up as well as instrumentation including hurdy-gurdy, clarinet, saxophone and an array of vintage keyboards alongside more traditional rock instruments. A couple of songs were written whilst Drake was still in Cardiacs and he has commented "There's a spice of that time on this album."

In 2023, Drake contributed a piano ballad titled "Where Do You Go", produced by Mieko Shimizu, for the collaborative EP Write to Be.

=== Work with North Sea Radio Orchestra & The fFortingtons (2004–present) ===
Since 2004, Drake has been involved with North Sea Radio Orchestra, the chamber ensemble led by his former Lake of Puppies colleagues Craig and Sharon Fortnam. The ensemble has performed songs and compositions written or co-written by Drake (including his setting of "Mimnermus in Church") and Drake has performed with them as both pianist and member of the vocal chorus. He has also played as part of an occasional acoustic trio with the Fortnams, under the name of The fFortingtons.

=== Sessions work ===
William D. Drake played keyboards with prog-goth band Lefaye during their support tour with The Cure in 1995. He also played keyboards for Slowdive/Mojave 3 singer Rachel Goswell on her debut solo album Waves Are Universal and the accompanying tour, as well as working with The Loose Salute (another Mojave 3 spin-off project). Drake played organ on the track "Orange Drop" on Funki Porcini's 2009 album Plod.

== Musical style ==
I love things from the deep, dark past. Nowadays we're bombarded by stuff on the radio all the time, so I always wondered what songs were like from the 15th century that we never hear. There must be some really fantastic songs that are completely forgotten.

— William D. Drake

Drake's music draws on a wide variety of sources including psychedelic rock (such as the work of Syd Barrett and Peter Hammill), sea shanties, Early Music (such as madrigals), and both classical and modernist solo piano music (including that of Dmitri Shostakovich). He has also displayed a taste for composing poetry settings featuring Jacobean and Romantic sources.

== Discography ==
=== Solo ===
==== Albums ====
- William D. Drake (2003, All My Eye And Betty Martin Music)
- Briny Hooves (2007, sheBear Records)
- Yew's Paw (2007, Onomatopoeia Records)
- The Rising of the Lights (2011, Onomatopoeia Records)
- Revere Reach (2015, Onomatopoeia Records)
- Moulded by Industry (2026, Onomatopoeia Records)

==== Singles/EPs ====
- "Melancholy World" (2002) CD single – Super 8 Recordings
- "Earthy Shrine" (2007) 7" single – Onomatopoeia Records
- "Lawrence" (2012) digital single – Self-released
- "Love in the Universe" (2023) digital single – Zebedog Records
- "The Flickering Shade" (2024) digital single – Zebedog Records

==== Compilation appearances ====
- Various Artists, Leader of the Starry Skies: A Tribute To Tim Smith, Songbook 1 (2010) album of cover versions of songs by Tim Smith – contributes cover version of "Savour"
- Various Artists, Cardiacs and Affectionate Friends (2001) album – contributes "Fiery Pyre"
- Various Artists, The Central Element (2011) album – contributes "Bond of the Herd"
- Various Artists, The Box album – contributes "One Armed Bandits".
- Various Artists, A Letter A Day - ATONA triple album - contributes "Serendipity Doodah" https://atona.bandcamp.com/album/atona-a-letter-a-day-hear-no-evil
- Various Artists, Write to Be (2023) EP – contributes "Where Do You Go"

=== With Cardiacs ===
According to Eric Benac:

Albums

- The Seaside (1984)
- Big Ship (1987)
- A Little Man and a House and the Whole World Window (1988)
- On Land and in the Sea (1989)
- Songs for Ships and Irons (1991)
- Heaven Born and Ever Bright (1992, television organ on track 6)

Singles

- "Seaside Treats" (1985)
- "There's Too Many Irons in the Fire" (1987)
- "Is This the Life" (1988)
- "Susannah's Still Alive" (1988)
- "Night Tracks (The Janice Long Sessions)" (1988)
- "Baby Heart Dirt" (1989)

Live albums

- Rude Bootleg (1986)
- Cardiacs Live (1988)
- All That Glitters Is a Mares Nest (1995)

=== With Nervous ===
- Son of the Great Outdoors (1996) album

=== With Lake of Puppies ===
- Various Artists, Cardiacs and Affectionate Friends (2001) album – contributes "Large Life"
- Lake of Puppies (2024) EP

=== As session/guest musician ===
- Rachel Goswell, Waves Are Universal, (2004) album
- Rachel Goswell, The Sleep Shelter EP, (2003) CD EP
- Wood, Songs from Stamford Hill, (2001) album
- Silver Ginger 5, 'Black Leather Mojo' (2001) album
- Funki Porcini, Plod, (2009) album
- Ott, Hiraeth (2024) album
