= Sarah Jones (multi-instrumentalist) =

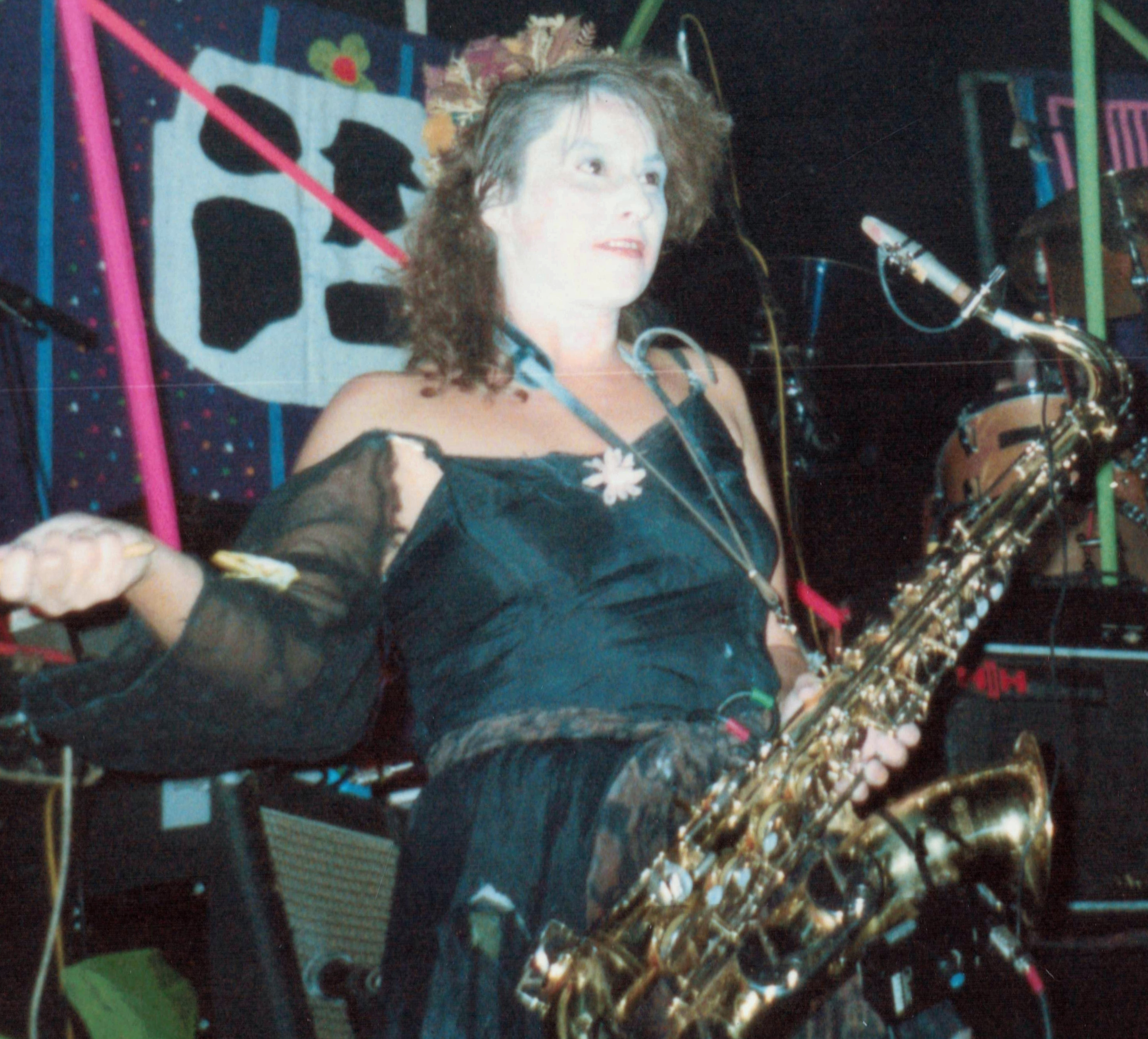
- Sarah Smith performing with Cardiacs in 1987
- Born: Sarah Cutts; 30 November 1960 (age 65); Coleford, Gloucestershire, England
- Other name: Sarah Smith (Note: Written "Sara" in some sources.)
- Education: Camberwell College of Arts (BA); Hereford College of Arts (MA)
- Known for: Drawing, multidisciplinary, painting, printmaking, sculpture, woodwork
- Movement: Batik
- Spouses: Tim Smith (m. 1983, divorced); Andy Jones (m. 2002)
- Musical career
- Instruments: Saxophone; vocals; clarinet; recorder; keyboards; percussion
- Years active: 1980–present
- Formerly of: Cardiacs; Mr & Mrs Smith & Mr Drake; The Sea Nymphs; Shrubbies
- Website: cuttsy.co.uk

Sarah Jones (née Cutts, formerly Smith; born 30 November 1960) is an English artist and musician. She joined the rock band Cardiacs in 1980 as a multi-instrumentalist, debuting on the album Toy World (1981), and married frontman and guitarist Tim Smith in 1983, becoming known as Sarah Smith. She became the saxophonist and a core member of the band's classic six-piece lineup, also contributing clarinet, recorders and vocals. After On Land and in the Sea (1989), she left Cardiacs in 1989 and later separated from Tim. She continued to play with the group in the studio and occasionally on stage, appearing on their albums as a guest, and retained the Smith name after her and Tim's divorce.

With Tim and keyboardist William D. Drake, Sarah played in the Cardiacs offshoot groups Mr and Mrs Smith and Mr Drake in the 1980s and the Sea Nymphs in the 1990s. Based in Malvern since 1999, she became Sarah Jones in 2002 from marrying Omnia Opera bassist Andy Jones. Since returning to art 2004, Sarah Jones has taught batik workshops in schools, formed the company Eekbatik with Marie-Therese King in 2008, and done art installations. Musically, she has recorded her own unshared compositions, completed work on the Sea Nymphs second album On the Dry Land (2016), composed a soundtrack for her and her brother Matthew Cutts' Transplant art installation and appeared on songs by Omnia Opera and Spratleys.

== Life and career ==
=== Early life and education ===
Jones was born Sarah Cutts on 30 November 1960, in Coleford, Gloucestershire to artists Jo (née Furmark) and Mike Cutts. Her parents were both abstract painters. Her younger brother Matthew Cutts was born in 1963. As Sarah's grandparents were all fishermen, she used to go down to the quay in North Shields when she was little. From 1977 to 1981, Cutts studied printmaking at Camberwell College of Arts, receiving a BA in graphic design and printmaking.

=== 1980–1990: Full-time member of Cardiacs ===
Cutts joined the cult British band Cardiacs, fronted by Tim Smith, as a multi-instrumentalist in the second half of 1980, The band had released a single and cassette as Cardiac Arrest before shortening their name to Cardiacs and releasing the Toy World cassette in 1981, by which time Cutts had joined on saxophone and keyboards. The cassette marked the debut of Cutts on keyboard, saxophone and vocals and was the last album with Colvin Mayers, who plays keys on a few tracks; most of the keyboards are split between Tim and Sarah, who also plays clarinet. According to Mark Cawthra, who joined the band as drummer in 1979, they didn't have any polyphonic keyboard until Cutts paid for a string machine. Writer Eric Benac said that her saxophone skill allowed Tim to expand his arrangement possibilities, emphasising the influence of Van der Graaf Generator and adding to the feeling of the track "A Big Noise in a Toy World" being "almost straight ska, but with new wave tweaks."

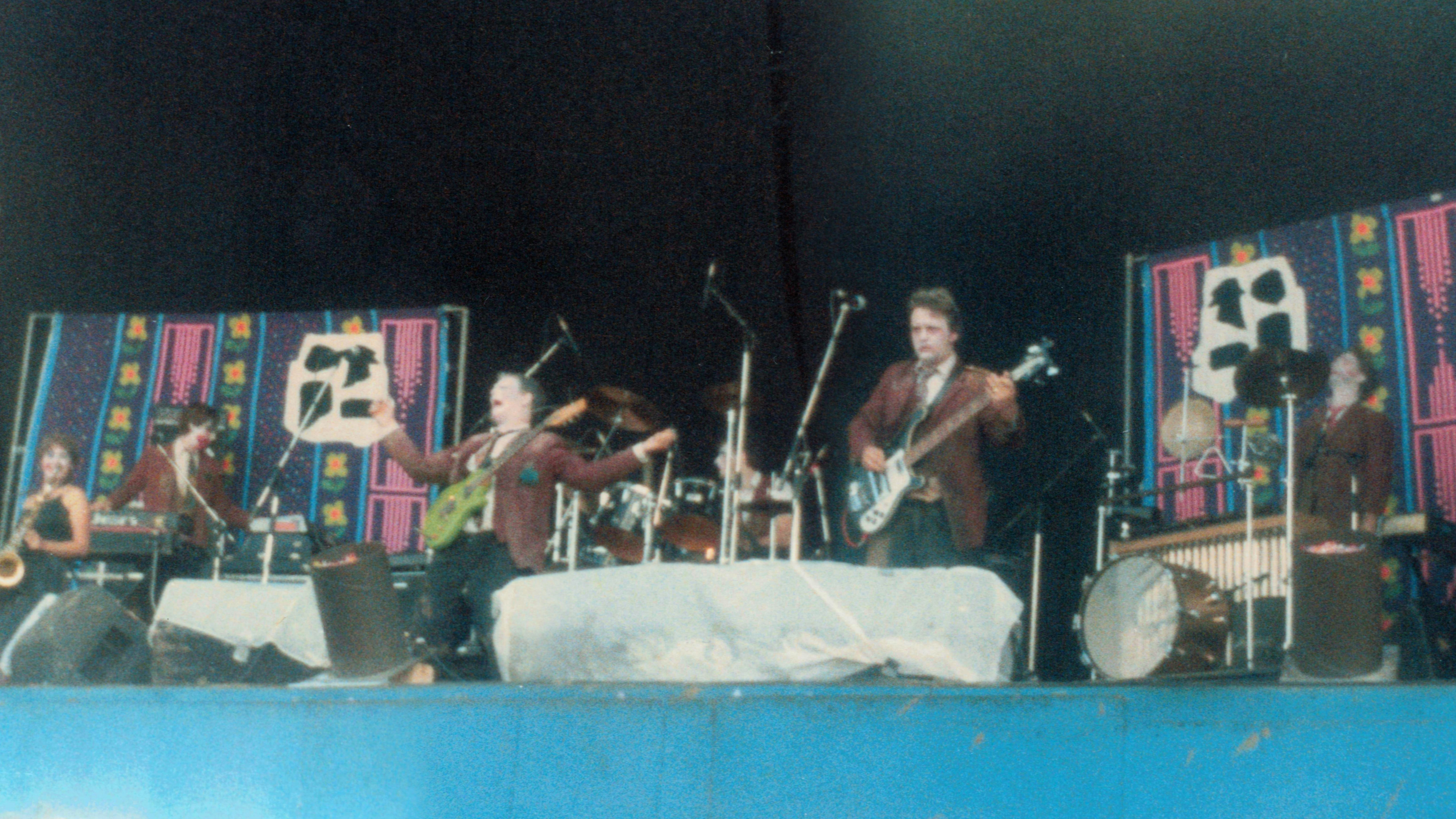
Sarah (left) with Cardiacs at Reading Rock Festival 1986

In 1983, Tim Smith married Cutts, who since became known as Sarah Smith. By then, Tim had found other musicians to translate his more ambitious pieces, including percussionist Tim Quy and keyboardist William D. Drake. Sarah would primarily become the band's saxophonist as a semi-stable line-up had emerged by 1983 around Tim Smith (guitar, vocals), Jim Smith (bass, vocals), Quy (percussion, keyboards), Drake (keyboards, vocals), Sarah, and Dominic Luckman (drums) which became known as the band's classic line up. Tim, Sarah and Drake were the only Cardiacs members who could read music. According to Quy, Tim Smith had music written out which didn't fit the Cardiacs genre, so a side project probably called the Cardiacettes was formed of Tim, Luckman and Quy, as well as Sarah on occasion, to rehearse and record some.

The band's shows were characterised by a pantomime theatricality: Tim Smith would harangue his bass-playing brother Jim and kiss Sarah. Tim and Sarah would engage in French-kissing, groping and hand holding on stage; sometimes Sarah would get pushed and shoved a bit. Drake recalled someone spitting at Sarah at a Cardiacs set supporting Marillion, with Tim kicking him in the mouth in time to the music.

"Hello Mr. Sparrow" was written by Tim and Sarah, and features countermelodies from Sarah. "A Wooden Fish on Wheels" includes sax breakdowns from Sarah, which Benac called "particularly powerful" in the context of the track's straighter ska rhythm and tempo. On "To Go Off and Things", the command "take it Sarah" is followed by an "eruption of electronic mayhem".

With sound engineer Graham Simmonds, who was a guitarist of Cardiacs for a brief period between 1983 and 1984, Tim and Sarah collaborated on the recording of Shock of Daylight by the Sound in 1984. The first side group to take shape from Cardiacs was called Mr & Mrs Smith & Mr Drake, which materialised in a single self-titled album released in 1984 on Alphabet. On Mr and Mrs Smith and Mr Drake, Tim, Sarah and Drake put aside the noisy, punk inclinations of Cardiacs and dedicate themselves to acoustic sketches which, according to Ondarock, sit between Henry Cow, Canterbury-style indolence, and chamber folk. Sarah's sax and woodwind create orchestral layers underpinning each composition, while her childlike singing adds a "sweet but sad" atmosphere to the three’s choral reveries. Her voice comes up primarily in harmonies, taking the lead a few times. Sarah's sax adds to the strange mood of "Little Creations", while the beginning of "Camouflage" has Tim and Sarah on guitar and melodica, respectively. Benac said Sarah's sax on the chorus of "The Collar" brings an immediate contrast that Tim Smith's more abstract song's on the album sometimes lack. The album's first instrumental, "All the String", has tuned percussion playing a melody from "Camouflage" which is later mirrored on Sarah's melodica. The album's penultimate song "Dergo" starts with Sarah on a melodica drone. On the song, she sings "Wild thing, you make everything groovy," in a soft choral melancholic call as a nod to the Troggs' classic "Wild Thing" which can also be heard on the Cardiacs song "It's a Lovely Day". Writing for Fact magazine, Alexander Tucker said that Sarah "shines throughout".

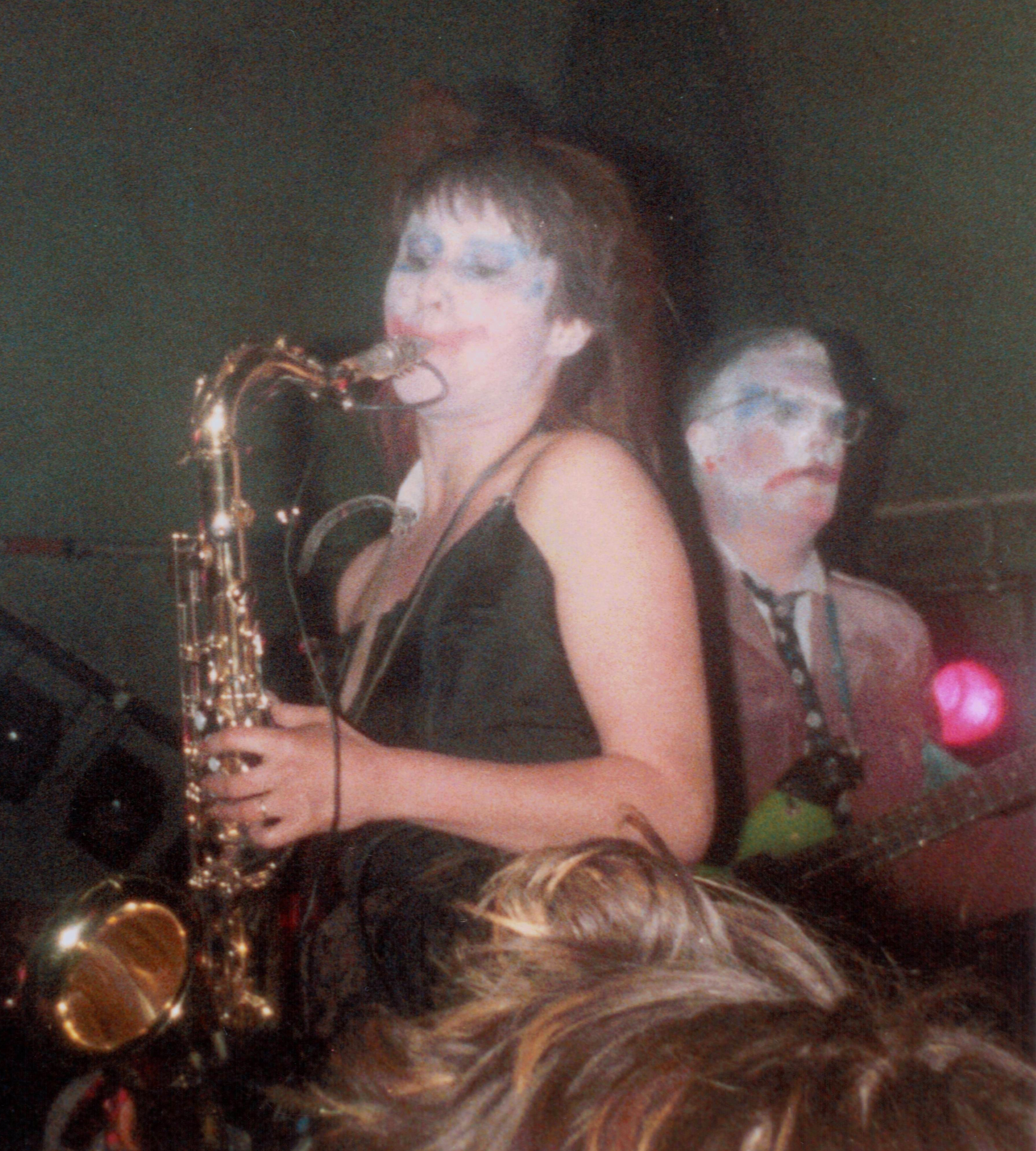
Sarah and Tim Smith in 1986

In 1986, Graham Bendel wrote to Cardiacs asking them what their influences were. In her responding letter, Sarah extensively explained how the "unhinged" sound of the band came to be, citing Van der Graaf Generator, Deaf School, Wire, Gentle Giant, Alberto y Lost Trios Paranoias, and others as influences. According to Sean Kitching of The Quietus, Sarah had once said to him that she thought Tim Smith used too many ideas in one song much of the time, and that he could have easily made an entire pop career out of just one or two of his tunes. In a rare interview without Tim, Sarah said that Tim was a workaholic who would work all night and go to sleep in the morning.

Although Cardiacs were ousiders of the industry, in 1987, the tabloid the Sunday Sport ran a double-page "exposé" story which falsely claimed that Tim and Sarah Smith were siblings in an incestuous relationship, as Tim had managed to persuade a Sunday Sport journalist that they were brother and sister. When fractions of the media mistook their relationship as siblings instead of man and wife, it found the band embroiled in a brief stir that predated a similar controversy between Jack and Meg White of the White Stripes by more than a decade. Tim and Sarah played along with the reports. Reed called the story the band's "one brief moment of infamy", while Marco Sgrignoli of Ondarock called it a publicity stunt of dubious effectiveness. An article in The Glasgow Herald in January 1987 also named Sarah as Tim's sister.

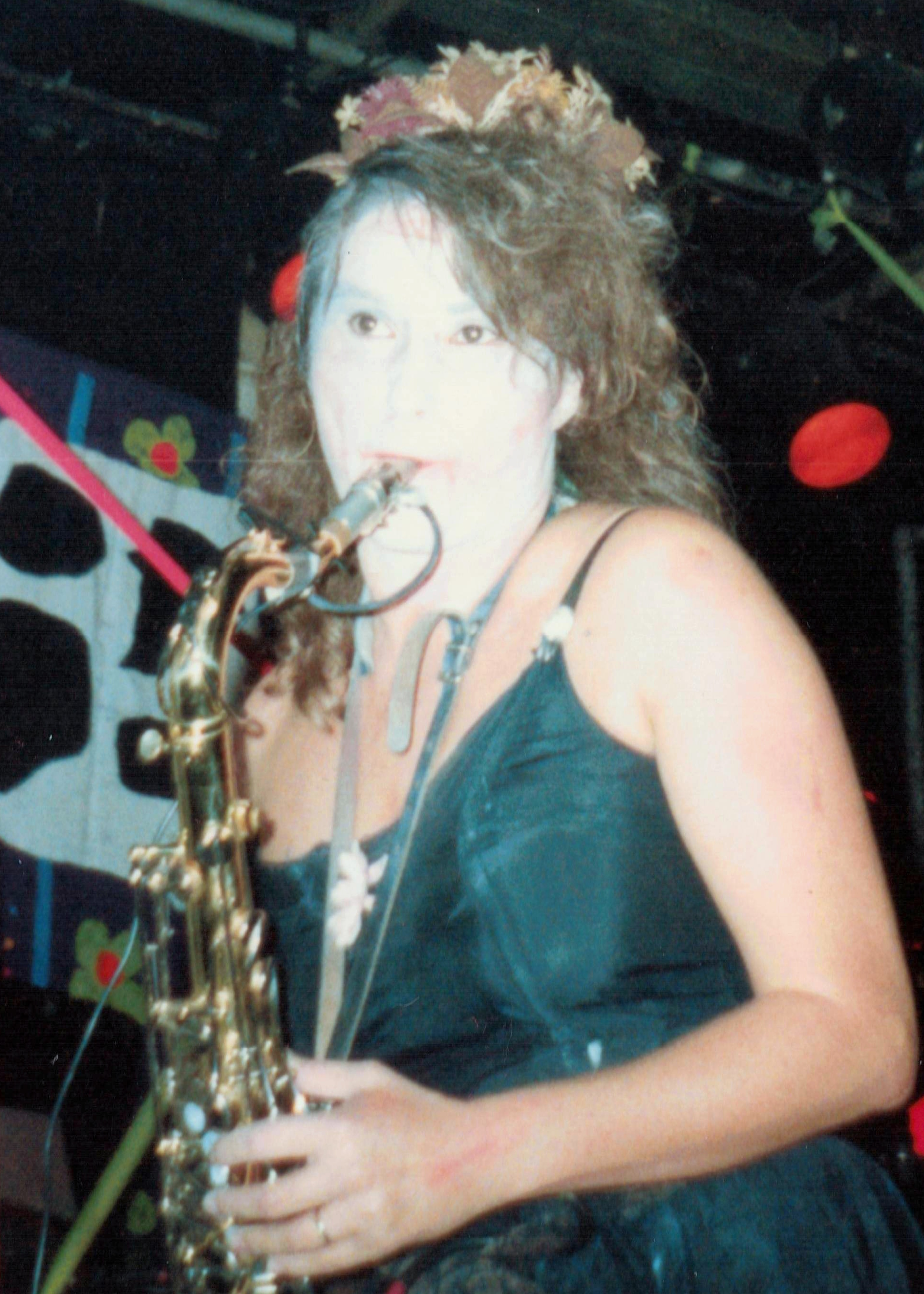
Sarah Smith with Cardiacs in 1987

"Stoneage Dinosaurs" features a saxophone solo by Sarah, which was played note for note on guitar by Jon Poole during concerts in the late 90s. Sarah plays a bluesy saxophone part throughout "All Spectacular", giving the sing-along concert favourite an amiable and open feel. "Loosefish Scapegrace" builds to an artful crescendo which "almost becomes R&B" through Sarah's sax and Tim's guitar. On "All His Geese Are Swans!", Sarah emphasizes different melodies on her saxophone, varying the same melody with the band as one of the standout instrumentalists along with Drake. The 1987 lineup recorded their debut studio album A Little Man and a House and the Whole World Window (1988), with the band working through the night to complete the album. Sarah contributed saxophone, clarinet, recorder and vocals.

"T.V.T.V." from Archive Cardiacs released in 1989 has horn likely played by Sarah. On 1989's On Land and in the Sea, "Arnald" features Sarah's saxophone and many keyboards including harpsichord. On "Horse Head", Sarah comes in for the line "All he wants to do is quietly breathe". "Buds and Spawn" goes into a stop-start rhythm as Sarah and Drake play "fast paced, proggy melodies reminiscent of Van der Graaf Generator or Yes."

"Everything Is Easy!", a concert favourite released on the 1991 album Songs for Ships and Irons, prominently features Sarah, with her saxophone playing the main melody hooks.

=== 1991–2003: The Sea Nymphs and Shrubbies, guesting with Cardiacs, homeopathy ===
The commercial failure of On Land and in the Sea led the band members to reconsider their prospects and started leaving on amicable terms. Soon after, the classic six-piece lineup disspiated. Sarah Smith was the first to announce her departure, and left in April 1989, removing saxophone from their sound with no replacement chosen. Christian "Bic" Hayes joined as the band's second guitarist, brought in by Tim who felt another instrumentalist was needed without Sarah. They separated in the early '90s so Sarah could "be a full-time witch and live in the woods with the snails". She retained the Smith name, even after their divorce, continued to play with the group in the studio and occasionally on stage, and would guest on future albums, preferring to appear on their albums as a guest than as a full-time Cardiac. Sarah was an official member for a day for a concert on 30 August 1990 at the Salisbury Arts Centre, as they recorded for the live album and film All That Glitters Is a Mare's Nest. According to Benac, Quy and Sarah would never play live with the band again after the concert. At one point, Sarah's sax lost its keys and her sound kept cutting out so that she couldn't hear herself. In addition to leaving the band in 1990, her marriage with Tim Smith ended in divorce.

Sarah played saxophones on "England's", a track on Tim Smith's solo album Tim Smith's Extra Special OceanLandWorld (1995) which was recorded in 1989 and 1990. The Sea Nymphs was formed by Tim Smith as a spin-off project involving him, Sarah and Drake. The Mr & Mrs Smith & Mr Drake trio renamed themselves the Sea Nymphs from 1991 for subsequent releases, because by the time the trio changed their name, Tim and Sarah were no longer a married couple and Sarah and Drake had moved on from Cardiacs. Even so, the Sea Nymphs continued to perform live. The project offered a gentler side of Tim Smith's creative output, with Sarah contributing wind instruments, percussion and voice to the group. Drake recalled at their album sessions in Rhosneigr, Anglesey they would get up late and Sarah would cook them "some gulls' eggs that she'd foraged for, and maybe some wild potatoes that she'd dug up from somewhere."

Sarah's saxophone remains prominent on The Sea Nymphs (1992) with textural and melodic aspects, often emphasising Drake's keyboards. "Shaping the River" features a combination of Tim and Sarah's voices, with her sax coming through at times. On "Nil in the Nest", Sarah sings over light piano and later plays a rich saxophone melody over minimal drums. "A Thousand Strokes and a Rolling Suck" has Sarah playing sax lines, with Benac commenting "about three-quarters of the song feels like Tim, Sarah and Drake are riding down whitewater rapids and barely escaping danger." Sarah and Tim duet on the verses of "Christ Alive" as treated voices are used sparingly in the mix. Benac called Sarah's vocal tone on "God's Box" "perfect for the lyrics, which are almost childlike in their approach." On "The Psalm of Life", Sarah makes an instrumental return, playing with sounds like a higher-pitched saxophone or a clarinet, with her melody and Drake's interacting to vary the rhythm. All three members sing on "Tree Tops High" and Drake and Sarah sing the verse of "Dog Eat Spine" in unison, with Sarah's sax coming in to accentuate Tim's melody in a manner similar to many Cardiacs songs. On "Sarah on a Worm", Sarah plays no horns, recorder or other instruments despite the instrumental being named after her. Some lines of "Lilly White's Party" feature Sarah and Drake harmonising with Tim Smith, and her light horn lines are deeply mournful to match the song's mood. On "Abade", Sarah takes the vocal in her softest and gentlest voice. Benac criticised the album for not using Sarah's sax or Tim's guitar as much is it could.

Benac opined that the loss of Sarah and Bill gave Cardiacs' next album, Heaven Born and Ever Bright (1992), a narrower scope. Sarah's saxophone appears during a few melodies of "March" and for extra melodic development on "Goodbye Grace". Benac also credits Sarah for vocals on "Helen and Heaven", and bringing '''For Good and All" together with her saxophone, adding a strong melody above the shoegazing guitars of Tim and Hayes. Benac said tracks like "For Good and All" "remind the listener of the tragedy of losing Sarah as a full-time player." "Fiery Gun Hand" from Sing to God (1996) features Cardiacs' trademark stop-and-start prog with Sarah's sax.

Sarah studied homeopathy at London School of Homeopathy from 1993 to 1997, when she qualified as a homeopath and set up practice in Kingston upon Thames. In 1999, she moved to Malvern as a homoeopath and personal assistant to Jeremy Sherr and the Dynamis postgraduate school of homoeopathy.

Sarah and Drake played with Cardiacs for one more time at a secret Cardiacs gig put on by Organ that the Sea Nymphs supported in January 1999. As of 1999, Sarah still performed on some Cardiacs recordings and played saxophone in Shrubby Veronica. The Shrubbies featured Craig and Sharron Fortnam with Sarah and Luckman. To The Stall Pigeon, Craig recalled having gone round Tim and Sarah's house, pestering them and ending up becoming friends with them. Prior to 8 March 1999, Sarah left the Shrubbies and Dan Maitland signed up on saxophone and keyboards.

Alongside Jo Spratley and Sharron Saddington, Sarah added additional vocals to the 1999 album Guns, which feature on several tracks. On "Wind and Rains Is Cold", Sarah's vocal shifts to the territory of Sea Nymphs with gentler music as she describes hair waving in the wind as being like "meadow grass under the flood", then leading the song's vocal over organ chords. "Sang 'All Away Away!'", a B-side of "Signs" from Guns, has Sarah playing sax lines. After Cardiacs and the Sea Nymphs, Sarah said in 2016 that she hadn't "really done anything musical since" and that she tried playing in other bands but the experience "never actually meant anything" to her, saying "I can't do it any more because it was just an extremely magical thing."

Sarah married Omnia Opera bassist Andy Jones in 2002, becoming Sarah Jones. In 2003, she opened the homoeopathic clinic Platos Tree.

=== 2004–present: Return to art and music ===
Jones returned to art and music in 2004 and started teaching batik workshops in primary schools. Jones's batik works are created using the ancient oriental technique of using hot wax on textiles. In 2005, Jones led an activity week in Colwall with fellow Malvern-based artists Marie-Therese King and Sarah Stanley where children used natural ingredients to create miniature gardens, willow lanterns and salad dressings. In March 2008, she formed the company Eekbatik with King to run school workshops and sell fine art prints and cards of original batik work. Their workshops carried out in local schools helped students create their own batiks through multi-layered printing of wax and dye. Specialising in creating pieces based on children's paintings, Eekbatik decked out the Circle Gallery at Malvern Theatres for an exhibition in August. The company signed a deal to produce designs for a major greetings card company as word of its unique craft spread. Jones started to exhibit own batik paintings at shows by Worcestershire Guild and opened a gallery at The Fold in 2009.

In 2009, King and Jones expanded their creative programs to schools across three countries. To mark the end of the year, they held a promotional sale of their work at Fold in Bransford to their existing customers.

In 2010, Jones recorded her own compositions for piano, sax and vocal which she said she would "dare share" one day. As Sarah Cutts, her track "The Barnacle Tree" was featured as a hidden track on Leader of the Starry Skies: A Loyal Companion, the bonus disc of Leader of the Starry Skies: A Tribute to Tim Smith, Songbook 1.

Jones was a band guest with Omnia Opera on their track "Liquid Underground" from Nothing Is Ordinary (2011), which features Jones's saxophone and opens with tribal drums and bass harmonics from Andy Jones. From 2011 to 2013, Sarah Jones studied astrology with John Wadsworth at Kairos Astrology.

A 2014 article about Mr and Mrs Smith and Mr Drake mentioned Sarah then using the name Sarah Cutts.

In the summer of 2015, Tim Smith returned to the studio to complete an album begun in 1992 by the Sea Nymphs, after the outpouring of fan support on Facebook increased interest in Tim's music and inspired Tim, Sarah and Drake to get together in the studio and wrap up work on the second Sea Nymphs album. Sarah called her ex-husband's re-entry to work "a very emotional experience". She and Drake conntinually looked to Tim throughout the process, who would smile when he liked what he heard. Sarah, in particular, was critical, as she had continually claimed that Sea Nymphs was her favourite band of all time. Craig Fortnam helped with recording, particularly the technical elements that Sarah and Drake could not handle, and skilled communication with Tim. The Sea Nymphs' second album On the Dry Land released in 2016, with Sarah saying "The Sea Nymphs was always my favourite thing, so it's pretty special for this album to finally come out."

Sarah's sax and clarinet were defining sounds of On the Dry Land, and Benac commented that "her saxophone skills remained on-point, and her vocals were as charming as ever." The first voice heard, on "After", is Sarah's distant vocal, which is doubled, giving the sound space, and features what Stuart Benjamin of Echoes and Dust called a "child-like Kate Bush squeal". On "Eating a Heart Out", Sarah sings and adds saxophone to give more harmonic depth, softly intoning "Say you'll die, say you'll leave me". Benjamin described her voice as "again soaring over the obscure lyrics". "Sea Snake Beware" has Drake in a duet with Sarah, who sings verse two and a chorus which reprises, as well as a round joined by Drake at the end. Sarah's saxophone on the instrumental "Mirmaid's Purse" is prominent, playing a complex, multi-layered part. "Cut Yourself Kidding" has Sarah's support on a recorder. She sings over a piano and drum rhythm on "Bye Bye Spirit" with a childlike directness. "On the Dry Land" has Sarah play a "catchy" sax line and horn alongside low-mixed vocals. Drake and Sarah sing together on "The Black Blooded Clam" over a "reasonally formal and classical background", with a brief saxophone part for Sarah. During the instrumentals of "The Sea Ritual", Sarah helps out on saxophone.

Art installations by Jones took place in 2016. The Transplant art installation by Matt Cutts and Jones explored the connectivity between art and nature, bringing together sculpture, images, music, poetry and living plants inside the Salisbury Arts Centre. It included batik paintings by Jones and a soundtrack of music, birdsong and field recordings composed by Jones and Craig Fortnam and/or Drake. Jones was among over 100 artists who took part in the second Worcestershire Open Studios event, exhibiting her batik works. She called the event" a good opportunity to meet art-lovers, tell them about your work and ask them what they think". Worcester Open Studios categorised Jones' work as drawing, multidisciplinary, painting, printmaking, sculpture and woodwork.

From 2020 to 2021, Jones studied at the Herford College of Art, receiving an MA in Fine Art. During lockdown, Jones lost both of her parents and discovered a deep love of working with wooden posts. In 2022, images of Jones' work were included in the Cultivate Mixtape No.2 online exhibition and she answered 13 questions from Organ. Sean Worrall of Organ called Jones's recent piece, Post Climate Stripes, referencing #showyourstripes and the work of Ed Hawkins, a particularly powerful piece. Jones was one of the exhibiting artists for the 2023 Worcester OPEN held at The Arthouse in conjunction with PITT Studio which focused on the issue of climate change. For Organ, Jones give six selections from The Art on a Postcard Auction in 2023.

At the 2024 Sing to Tim tribute live dates from Cardiacs Family, Jones' parts were covered by Chloe Herington. The music of Tim, Sarah and Drake was performed at the Sing to Tim celebration by Richard Larcombe and friends as the Smith and Drake Ensemble.

A Spratleys song, "Koiptics" released in 2026 as a first offering from their album Bloom and features Sarah "singing like a bird upon it".

== Musical style ==
Benac said that Sarah effortlessly served as Tim Smith's most consistent foil over the years, and that she, Drake and Tim had become "virtually telepathic players" by A Little Man and a House and the Whole World Window. The three were dubbed the "core members" of Cardiacs by Kitching and Organ's Sean Worral. Tim Smith would often use his guitar as a support for Sarah or Drake, allowing them to shine on his melodies. Nick Reed of The Quietus called Sarah's voice "equally gorgeous and unsettling" with a pitch that "feels almost unnaturally high and childish" like Kate Bush, noting how it balanced out the singing of Tim Smith. Benac opined that Sarah's voice has more in common with post-punk or shoegaze singers like My Bloody Valentine's Bilinda Butcher, rather than folk singers like Maddy Prior. and noted that, in most cases, Sarah is vocally the Pete Townshend to Tim's Roger Daltrey, though Tim could sound emotional. He called the combination of Sarah and Tim's voices "a pleasant one" that combined well, and its rarity a shame.

== Discography ==
=== Solo ===
- "The Barnacle Tree" (2010, A Tribute to Tim Smith: A Loyal Companion [hidden track])

=== With Cardiacs ===
According to Eric Benac, except where noted:

Albums

- Toy World (1981)
- The Seaside (1983)
- Big Ship (1987)
- A Little Man and a House and the Whole World Window (1988)
- Archive Cardiacs (1989)
- On Land and in the Sea (1989)
- Songs for Ships and Irons (1991)
- Heaven Born and Ever Bright (1992, as guest)
- Sing to God (1996, as guest)
- Guns (1999, as guest)

Singles

- "Seaside Treats" (1985)
- "There's Too Many Irons in the Fire" (1987)
- "Is This the Life" (1988)
- "Susannah's Still Alive" (1988)
- "Night Tracks (The Janice Long Sessions)" (1988)
- "Baby Heart Dirt" (1989)
- "Bellyeye" (1995, as guest)
- "Manhoo" (1996, as guest)
- "Signs" (1999, as guest)

Live albums

- Rude Bootleg (1986)
- Cardiacs Live (1988)
- All That Glitters Is a Mares Nest (1995)

=== Other credits ===
Title	Year	Artist	Notes
Shock of Daylight	1984	The Sound	Brass arranged and played by (with Tim Smith)
"Captain Scarlet" / "Lunar Love Affair"	1986	The Trudy	Tenor saxophone on "Captain Scarlet"
Earth vs the Wildhearts	1993	The Wildhearts	Sax on "Greetings from Shitsville"
Bodies	1995	Sidi Bou Said	Recorders
Tim Smith's Extra Special OceanLandWorld	1995	Tim Smith	Saxs on "England's"
Briny Hooves	2007	William D. Drake	Recorders & voice
The Adventures! The Suspense!!	2009	The Trudy	Tenor saxophone on "Captain Scarlet" and "The Man from MI5"
The Rising of the Lights	2011	William D. Drake	Voice & alto-saxophone on "In an Ideal World" and "Homesweet Homestead Hideaway"
I a Moon	2011	North Sea Radio Orchestra	Backing vocals on "Morpheus Miracle Maker" (with Jo Spratley)
Nothing Is Ordinary	2011	Omnia Opera	Saxophone on "Liquid Underground"
"Koiptics"	2026	Spratleys	Supporting vocals (with Maddy Wright and Jesse Cutts)
Bloom	2026	Spratleys	Extra beautiful singing, The Magical Moon Family Choir on "Bloom" (with Andy Jones and Matthew Cutts)
