= Mr and Mrs Smith and Mr Drake =

Mr & Mrs Smith & Mr Drake
- Artwork of the original 1984 cassette release

Demo album by Mr & Mrs Smith & Mr Drake
- Released: 1984
- Recorded: c. 1983–1984
- Genre: Medieval; folk
- Length: 36:44
- Label: Alphabet

The Sea Nymphs chronology
Mr & Mrs Smith & Mr Drake (1984)	The Sea Nymphs (1992)

Alternative cover
- 2004 CD reissue

Professional ratings
Review scores
Source	Rating
Encyclopedia of Popular Music	3/5 stars

Mr and Mrs Smith and Mr Drake (Note: Also written Mr & Mrs Smith & Mr Drake or Mr & Mrs Smith and Mr Drake, and variations thereof with full stops after honorifics. (Note: The front cover of the original cassette spells the title with two ampersands, although the spine does not. Various CDs spell the title with only one initial ampersand, with the disc label sometimes using full stops.)) is an album by Cardiacs members Tim Smith, Sarah Smith and William D. Drake. Recorded and released in 1984, it was the trio's only recording to be distributed prior to their 1991 reformation as the Sea Nymphs.

The album was initially only available on cassette through the fan club and at concert venues. The first version of the cassette cover is dark with the logo printed in gold; the track list is handwritten. The second version has a purple satin design with a smaller gold logo; the track list is printed in gold. In 2004 it was reissued on CD by All My Eye and Betty Martin Music.

== Background ==
Tim Smith and William D. Drake met in 1983 when Drake was in the band Honour Our Trumpet with musician Little Sue. Smith had taught himself to sight-read music as a teenager and wanted Drake's involvement as he was classically trained. He joined Smith's band Cardiacs as he loved the music he was first provided with.

== Reception ==
In 2017, Sean Worrall of Organ called Mr and Mrs Smith and Mr Drake "a tape album of staggering beauty and oddness and fragility".

== Track listing ==
Adapted from Bandcamp. All songs written by Tim Smith unless otherwise indicated.

No.	Title	Writer(s)	Length
1.	"Little Creations"		1:54
2.	"Camouflage"		3:43
3.	"The Collar"	William D. Drake	4:17
4.	"In a Waiting Room"		1:28
5.	"All the String"		1:21
6.	"Summer Is-a-Coming In"	Drake	4:06
7.	"Too Many Colours"		0:32
8.	"Your Removal of Me"		2:33
9.	"A Treat from Mr Smith"		1:43
10.	"To My Piano from Mr Drake"	Drake	4:40
11.	"Dergo"		8:20
12.	"That's All"		2:07
Total length:			36:44

Notes

- The lyrics of "To My Piano from Mr Drake" are adapted from "The Garden" by English poet Andrew Marvell.
- "Summer Is-a-Coming In" is based on the 13th century English round.

== Personnel ==
Adapted from the Mr and Mrs Smith and Mr Drake liner notes.

- Tim Smith – guitars, flute, trumpets, glockensput, Woolworths organ, vocals
- Sarah Smith – clarinets, saxophones, recorders, forks, melodica, vocals
- William D. Drake – piano, television organ, forks, ballroom string machine, vocals
