= Woodeneye =

Single by Cardiacs

from the album LSD
- Released: 1 August 2025
- Genre: Psychedelic rock
- Length: 3:19
- Label: Alphabet Business Concern
- Songwriter: Tim Smith
- Producers: Tim Smith; Kavus Torabi

Cardiacs singles chronology
"Vermin Mangle" (2020)	"Woodeneye" (2025)	"Downup" (2025)

Music video
- "Woodeneye" on YouTube

"Woodeneye" (Note: Styled in all caps on Bandcamp. Written "Wooden Eye" on BBC Radio 6 Music.) is a song by the British band Cardiacs from their album LSD (2025). It was written and co-produced by the bandleader of Cardiacs, Tim Smith, who died in 2020. Work on LSD continued after Smith's illness and death, and the Alphabet Business Concern released "Woodeneye" on 1 August 2025 as the album's first single in a series of three before the album's release.

A psychedelic rock song, "Woodeneye" features vocals by Mike Vennart, Rose Kemp and the rest of the band in a choral effect, with punk style guitars. Critics praised the song for its energy, complex composition, and familiarity with Cardiacs' discography. The song was first played in the United Kingdom the BBC Radio 6 Music programme Riley & Coe on 31 July and a video for the single was shared by the band.

== Background and release ==
Cardiacs, a cult-beloved British band, released their then-most recent album, Guns, in 1999. In 2008, Cardiacs bandleader Tim Smith almost finished a double album titled LSD and was about to release the first in a series of singles from it when he collapsed in London, suffering a series of strokes that left him with the condition dystonia. Unable to speak and with limited movement, Smith needed constant full time care. Until his death in 2020, a support system made up of creatives and carers enabled him to slowly reemerge by attending concerts arranged for him, visiting his home studio and directing others to work on his unreleased Sea Nymphs album as well as much work on LSD, including bringing in new vocalists to add the voice he had lost. The lead single of LSD was supposed to be "Ditzy Scene", which came out in 2007, before the album's release was delayed. After Smith's illness death, Cardiacs released another LSD song, "Vermin Mangle", and Tim's brother and bandmate Jim Smith later said that Cardiacs kept working on LSD. Along with the determination to finish his work, the Cardiacs fan base had grown exponentially since Tim's death.

"Woodeneye" was written and co-produced by Tim Smith. Following a YouTube broadcast of a Cardiacs concert filmed at London's Town and Country Club in 1988, Cardiacs announced "Woodeneye" as a new single from the forthcoming album LSD, with the announcement appearing on screen at the end. "Woodeneye" was first played in the United Kingdom on BBC Radio 6 Music's programme Riley & Coe on 31 July 2025, and was released by the Alphabet Business Concern on 1 August 2025 as the first of three singles before the release of LSD, their final album, in September. The band also shared a video for the single, a visualiser created by Mike Bourne.

Following the single's release, Kavus Torabi performed a guitar playthrough of "Woodeneye" via YouTube, describing his role in shaping the song with Tim Smith.

== Composition ==
"Woodeneye" is three minutes and 19 seconds long. It features the Empire State Bastard and former Oceansize musician Mike Vennart, who took over as lead singer, and also contains vocal contributions from Rose Kemp (or Rose-Ellen Kemp) and the rest of the band which includes Jim Smith, their longtime bandmate Kavus Torabi, and Bob Leith who plays drums. According to Organ, the single's vocalists are a hint of the work from the 2020s to save Tim's vision for the album. Adam Noble mixed the song, and Frank Arkwright mastered it at Abbey Road Studios.

Musically, "Woodeneye" is a psychedelic rock song, which Stereogum's Tom Breihan described as a "frantic psychedelic rock attack". According to Sean Kitching of The Quietus, "Woodeneye" features "propulsive, punky guitars", a symphonic choral effect, and guitar soloing from Torabi who contributed arrangements to LSD. Organ drew comparison to new wave music, calling it "crisp and new wavey", while Breihan said that it "resists categorization".

== Critical reception ==
Breihan called "Woodeneye" "a wild piece of music", which he said meant "it fits right in with the rest of Cardiacs' discography". Sean Worrall of Organ opined that "Woodeneye" "comes at [the listener] with a freshness and directness that might surprise those who’d only read about how complex and weird and ‘'difficult' and obtuse Cardiacs were," but that the song "doesn’t surprise anyone familiar with them." Worrall also said the song "fizzes with energy, a triumphant, lively blast, a blast of life", calling it "somehow timeless, instantly stimulating to dance, mosh, pogo, whatever until it goes off and things and becomes utterly, unstoppably Cardiacs in nature." Kitching included "Woodeneye" in The Quietus' list of the best albums and tracks of July 2025, calling it a "classic Cardiacs banger" and "an enticing entrée for the main course soon to come, but one that only hints at the diversity of the delights to follow". BrooklynVegan said the song "finds Cardiacs sounding as chaotic as ever".

== Personnel ==
Credits adapted from Bandcamp. Apple Music does not credit Jim and instead credits Tim Smith for bass guitar, electric guitar and vocals.

- Bob Leith – drums, percussion, vocals
- Tim Smith – guitars, keyboards
- Jim Smith – basses, vocals
- Kavus Torabi – guitars, vocals
- Mike Vennart – vocals
- Rose Kemp – vocals
- Nick Howiantz – vocals

Technical

- Jim Smith – executive producer
- Tim Smith – producer
- Kavus Torabi – producer
- Nick Howiantz – engineering
- Adam Noble – mixing engineer
- Frank Arkwight – mastering engineer

== Charts ==
Chart performance for "Woodeneye"
Chart (2025)	Peak position
UK Singles Sales (OCC)	56
UK Singles Downloads (OCC)	54
