= Joanne Joanne =

- Origin: London, England
- Genres: New wave, synthpop
- Years active: 2012–present
- Spinoffs: MX Tyrants
- Members: Charley Stone; Lolo Wood; Jo Gate-Eastley; Mel Woods; Val Gwyther
- Past members: Jo Bevan
- Website: joannejoanne.co.uk

Joanne Joanne is an all-female Duran Duran tribute band based in London, England. They have received media coverage from various sources including The Guardian and the Birmingham Mail.

The band's initial line-up was Jo Bevan (also of Desperate Journalist) on vocals, Charley Stone (from all the bands) on lead guitar, Lolo Wood on keyboard, Jo Gate-Eastley on bass, and Mel Woods (Knifeworld/Sidi Bou Said) on drums. Val Gwyther now sings with the band. They are known for playing only material from the early career of Duran Duran, and "don't do Rio".

Stone, Wood, Gate-Eastley and Woods perform original material, with Wood providing lead vocals, as MX Tyrants; their first single and video was "Mutual Lucid".
