= Melanie Woods (musician) =

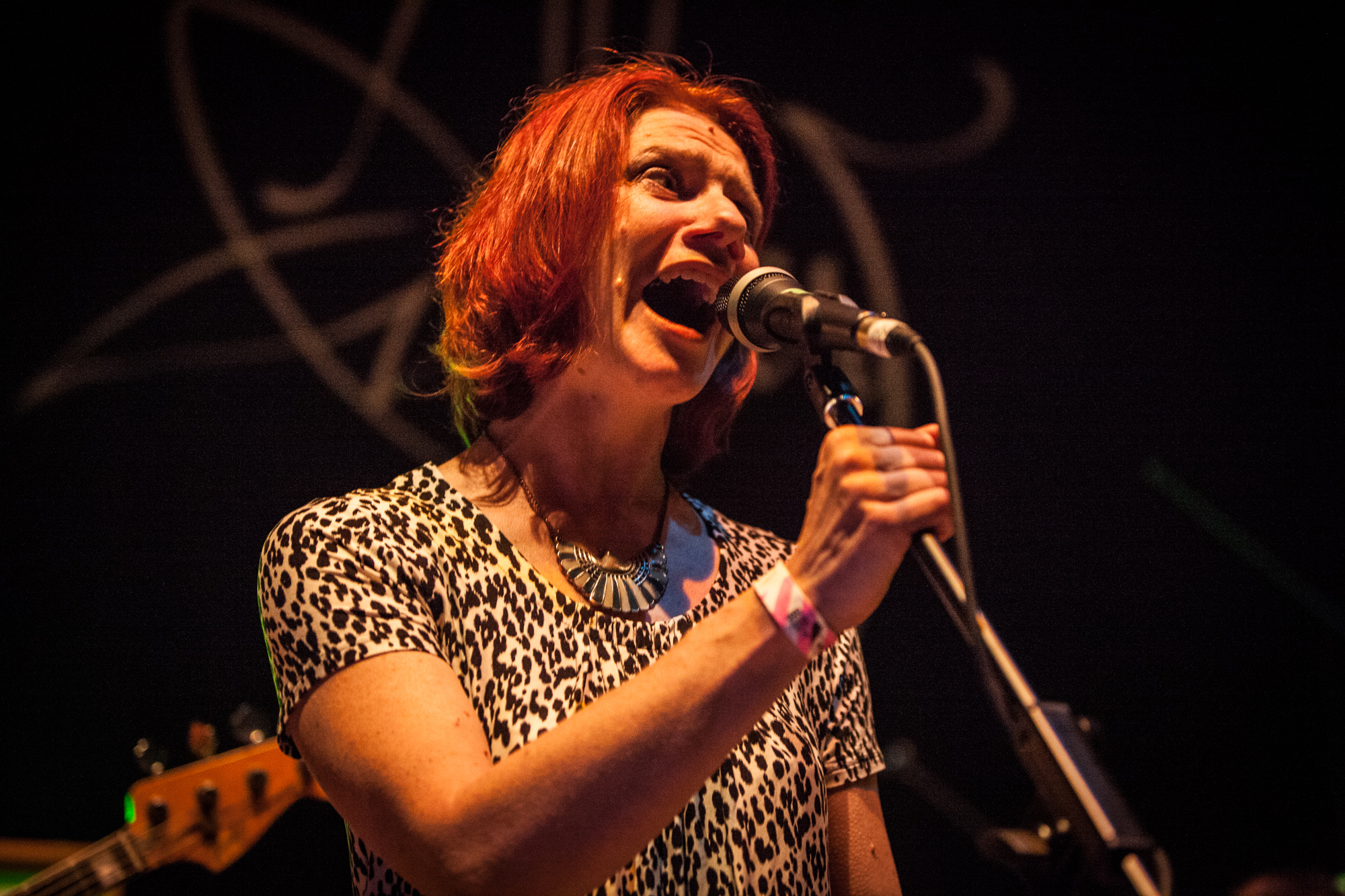
- Woods with Knifeworld at Tramlines 2015

Background information
- Also known as: Mel Woods
- Born: 5 May 1969 (age 57); London, England
- Occupations: Musician; singer; carpenter; joiner; carpentry tutor
- Instruments: Vocals; drums; percussion
- Years active: 1990–present
- Member of: Knifeworld; Joanne Joanne
- Formerly of: Sidi Bou Said; Umbrella Heaven; Ponce; North Sea Radio Orchestra; Cardiacs; MX Tyrants
- Website: melaniewoods.co.uk

Melanie Woods (born 5 May 1969) is an English musician, singer, carpenter, joiner, and carpentry tutor. She was the drummer and a vocalist for the rock band Sidi Bou Said in the 1990s. After their dissolution, she performed vocals on the first two albums of the North Sea Radio Orchestra and joined the cult rock band Cardiacs in 2004, performing on the single "Ditzy Scene" and playing on the subsequent 2007 tour before the band ceased their activities in 2008.

Woods subsequently joined Kavus Torabi's psychedelic rock band Knifeworld on vocals, percussion and glockenspiel, and the Duran Duran tribute act Joanne Joanne as their drummer. She appeared on the 2010 Tim Smith tribute album Leader of the Starry Skies with Knifeworld and Sidi Bou Said, and the Cardiacs single "Vermin Mangle", released in 2020. Woods has also performed on solo albums by Claire Lemmon and Tim Bowness.

== Early life ==
Woods was born on 5 May 1969 in London, England.

== Musician career ==
=== 1990–2001: Sidi Bou Said and Umbrella Heaven ===
Woods formed the rock band Sidi Bou Said in 1990 on drums and vocals alongside guitarist and vocalist Claire Lemmon and bassist Gayl Harrison. They released their debut album Broooch in 1993. The following year, Woods appeared as a member of the band Umbrella Heaven with Lemmon on "Perverted Pleasure", the lead single of the 1995 album Do You Hate Me?. Sidi Bou Said's two succeeding studio albums—Bodies (1995) and Obsessive (1997)—and Umbrella Heaven's second CD Chosen to be Frozen (1997) also featured Woods. Reflecting on a recording experience of Sidi Bou Said in 1995, Woods said "Looking back on it now, we would have done it differently but then we wouldn't have known that." After Sidi Bou Said disbanded in 1998, Woods performed drumming and percussion on Lemmon's solo album Cleaner (1999). In 2000, Woods was featured in the lineup of the band Ponce alongside Jim Smith of Cardiacs. She did not perform on Umbrella Heaven's final album Light Sleeper (2000) before the group split up in 2001.

=== 2002–2008: North Sea Radio Orchestra and Cardiacs ===
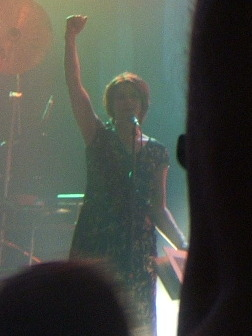
Woods live with Cardiacs at the London Astoria in 2005

Woods performed vocals in the North Sea Radio Orchestra, a contemporary chamber group formed in October 2002 by composer Craig Fortnam and his wife Sharron. She was part of the North Sea Chorus on the band's first two albums—North Sea Radio Orchestra (2006) and Birds (2008)—which drew plaudits from classical publications and indie music magazines. In 2004, Woods joined the lineup of the cult rock band Cardiacs as a vocalist alongside Lemmon and Sharron Fortnam, as well as percussionists Cathy Harabaras (who previously played on Cleaner and with Umbrella Heaven) and Dawn Staple. The band started work on new compositions and recordings for an album provisionally titled LSD, releasing the single "Ditzy Scene" in 2007 and touring until winter of that year. Cardiacs frontman Tim Smith, who produced Sidi Bou Said, had a cardiac arrest in 2008 which left him with the condition dystonia; Cardiacs ceased their activities whilst Woods was in the band's formation.

=== 2009–present: Knifeworld and Joanne Joanne ===
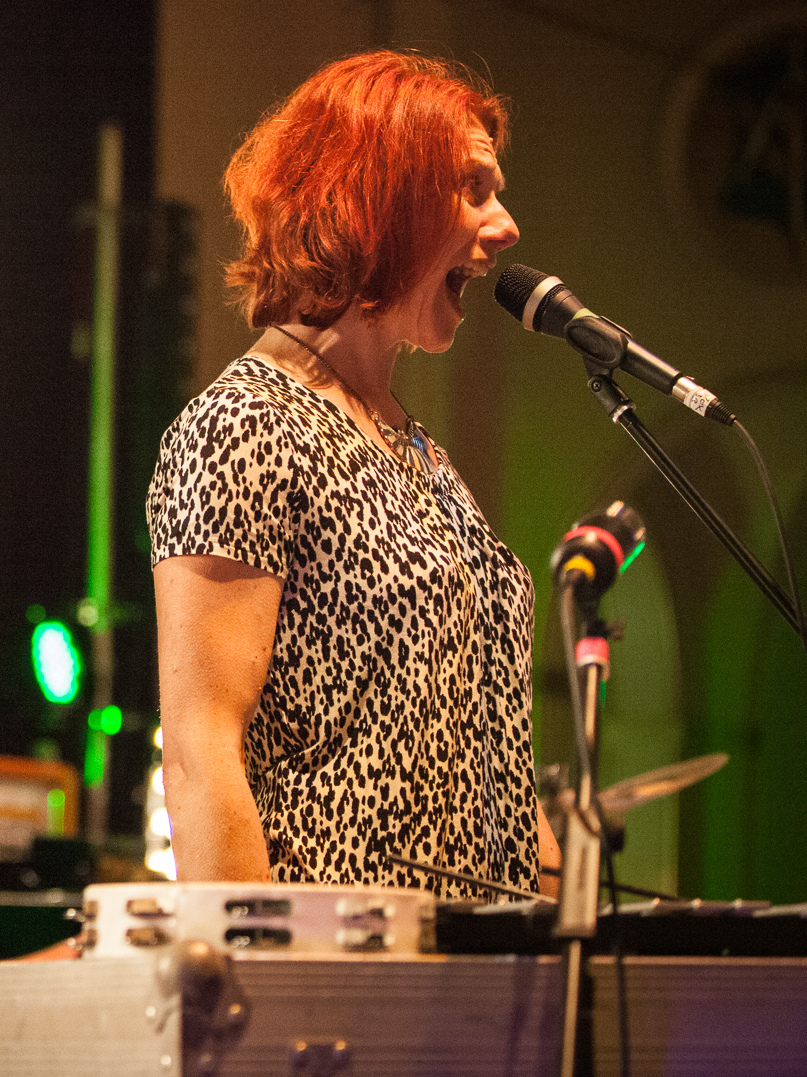
Woods with Knifeworld, 2015

Kavus Torabi of Cardiacs and the North Sea Radio Orchestra enlisted Woods in his psychedelic rock band Knifeworld, initially as a special guest on their debut album Buried Alone: Tales of Crushing Defeat (2009). Knifeworld covered the Cardiacs song "The Stench of Honey" on the album Leader of the Starry Skies: A Tribute to Tim Smith, Songbook 1 (2010), which also features a Sidi Bou Said cover of "Victory Egg" where Woods and Lemmon "cascade across barrages of machine-gun drums with a graceful elegance". The sextet released the four-track EP Clairvoyant Fortnight in 2012. According to Rob Hughes of Prog, the title track finds Torabi and Woods "trading vocals over deliciously knotty rhythms". She continued to provide vocals for their albums The Unravelling (2014) and Bottled Out of Eden (2016), sharing vocal duties with Torabi and brass player Chloe Herington, as well as playing percussion and glockenspiel. Bottled Out of Eden's closer "Feel the Sorcery" features vocals from the former Cardiacs percussionist, which leads to a "sax and harmony- heavy climax." In an interview with Echoes and Dust, Torabi mentioned potentially making Woods the second drummer of the band with Ben Woollacott. Woods is also the drummer of the all-female Duran Duran tribute act Joanne Joanne. She featured on Tim Bowness's solo album Late Night Laments (2020) with Torabi. The same year, the Cardacs song "Vermin Mangle" was released exclusively on Bandcamp as a single from LSD after Smith's death. In the song, Woods plays around the rhythm of drummer Bob Leith.

== Carpentry career ==
Woods has been a qualified carpenter and joiner to NVQ level 3 since 1999 and makes fitted furniture. Before finding her passion in carpentry, she worked in a high street bank and as a musician. She is also a part-time carpentry tutor.

== Discography ==
=== With Umbrella Heaven ===
- Do You Hate Me? (1995)
- Chosen to be Frozen (1997)
- New Friend (EP, 1997)
- The Golden Greats of Umbrella Heaven (compilation, 2020)

=== With Claire Lemmon ===
- Cleaner (1999)

=== With North Sea Radio Orchestra ===
- North Sea Radio Orchestra (2006)
- Birds (2008)

=== With Cardiacs ===
- "Hurricane" (1996, B-side of "Odd Even")
- "Ditzy Scene" (single, 2007)
- "Vermin Mangle" (single, 2020)
- LSD (2025)

=== With Joanne Joanne ===
- "New Religion" (2014)
- "The Chauffeur" (2014)

=== With MX Tyrants ===
- Masters (EP, 2016)

=== With Tim Bowness ===
- Late Night Laments (2020)
