= Bob Leith =

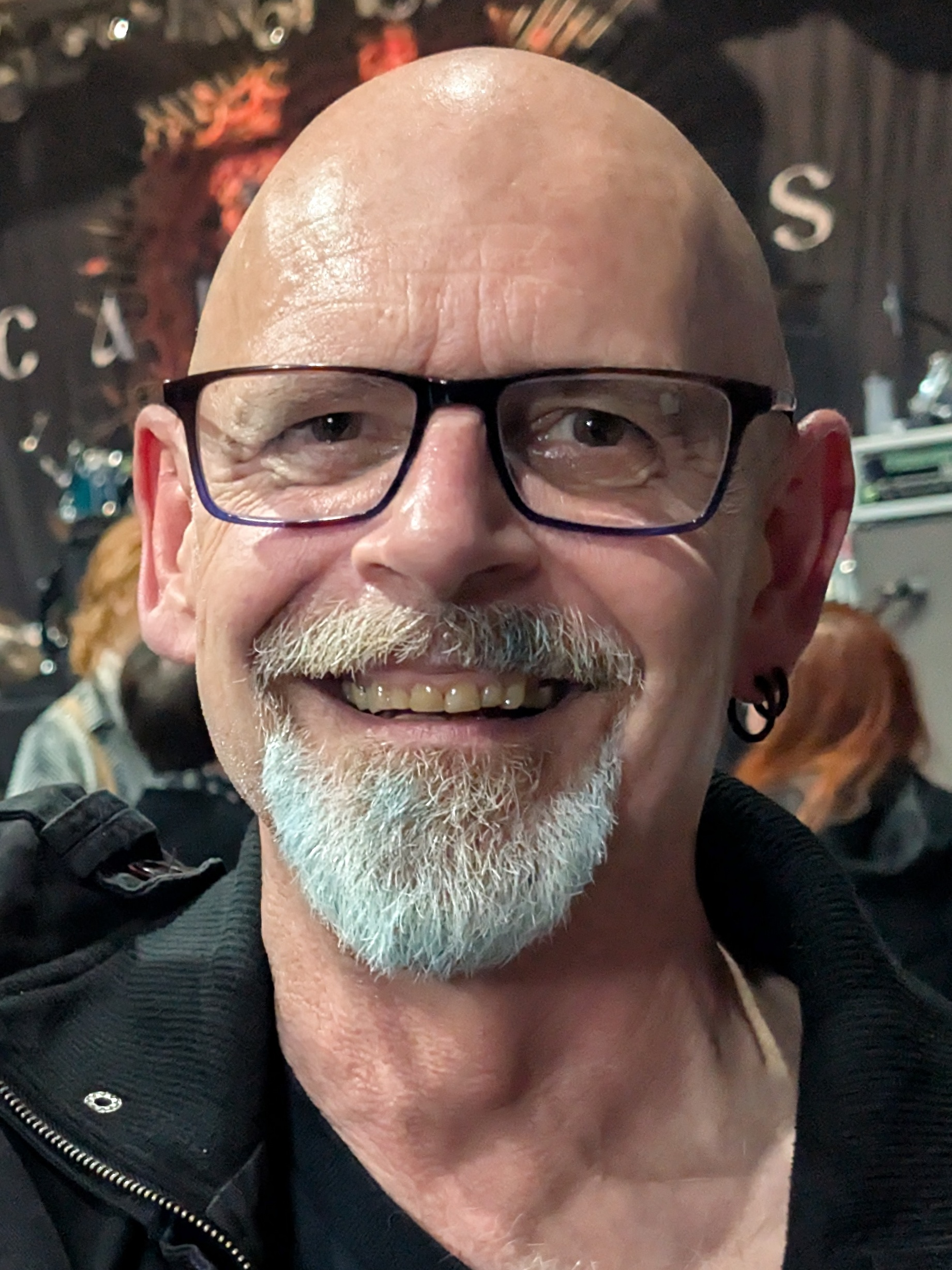
- Leith at Electric Brixton in 2026

Background information
- Also known as: Bob "Babba" Leith
- Born: Robert G. Leith; 17 April 1964 (age 62); Buckinghamshire, England
- Origin: Milton Keynes
- Genre: Rock
- Occupations: Musician; singer; songwriter
- Instruments: Drums; vocals; percussion
- Member of: Cardiacs; Panixphere
- Formerly of: The Bleeding Lips; Matt Vinyl and the Emulsions; Part 1; The Snails; Ad Nauseam; Ablemesh; Dr Brighton; Alternative TV; Katherine in a Cupboard; Leisur Hive; Blurt; Spiritwo

Robert G. Leith (born 17 April 1964) is an English musician, the drummer for the rock band Cardiacs from 1993 and Blurt from 2005 to 2008. Leith played in secondary school bands in Milton Keynes inspired by the punk ethos and co-formed the anarcho-punk band Part 1, which he played with from 1980 to 1983 in the early death rock scene.

Before joining Cardiacs, Leith was the singer and drummer in the progressive pop band Ad Nauseam with guitarist Jon Poole. Both Cardiacs fans, they became friends with the band after following them on tour and Poole took Bic Hayes' place on guitar in 1991, recruiting Leith to replace Cardiacs' long-time drummer Dominic Luckman when Luckman left in July 1993. Leith joined in December, which found Cardiacs their second "classic" lineup on the albums Sing to God (1996) and Guns (1999) which he contributed lyrics to. He played on the 2005 live album The Special Garage Concerts and the 2017 DVD Some Fairytales from the Rotten Shed which comprises rehearsal footage prior to the 2003 concerts. Leith was active with Cardiacs until the band went on an indefinite hiatus in 2008, with the release of their album LSD delayed, due to the frontman Tim Smith having a cardiac arrest. LSD was released in 2025, featuring drums and lead vocals sang by Leith on some tracks.

Leith also played with the reformed Alternative TV in 1995 and 1996 and sang in the band Katherine in a Cupboard which Cardiacs bassist Jim Smith played in. He made his debut with Blurt at the 2004 Glastonbury Festival and recorded three tracks on their album Cut It! released in 2010. Leith played with Ablemesh and Dr Brighton in the 1990s, Hayes' band Panixphere since 2019, Cardiacs Family in the 2024 Sing to Tim gigs commemorating Smith, and has guested with Crayola Lectern all alongside Poole. He has drummed for the bands Leisur Hive, Spiritwo, Mark Cawthra's band Redbus Noface, the Italian pop group Sterbus, and the Stephen Evens Band.

== Life and career ==
Robert G. Leith was born in Buckinghamshire on 17 April 1964. Leith's father managed the local cinema and Leith was into films. He met future guitarist Mark Farrelly when they were about nine years old through Farrelly's interest in horror and death; the pair would swap horror magazines and plastic monster models which they were into around 1975. They both went to the Lord Grey Comprehensive secondary school in Bletchley where Leith started up a band called the Bleeding Lips and brought a tape he had done to Farrelly's house one night, inspiring Farrelly to hook up with future Exit-stance member Sean Finnis in the school band the Urban Guerrillas. By the end of 1978, Leith joined up with Farrelly, Finnis and another person to form a school 'supergroup' named Matt Vinyl and the Emulsions, inspired by the punk ethos. They played their first gig in the school hall. Farrelly and Finnis went on to be in several other bands together before Farrelly formed Part 1 with Leith, Chris Baker and Chris Pascoe. They each had their own influences; Leith liked early Genesis.

Part 1 were with the early death rock scene and mined a similar vein aesthetically to Rudimentary Peni. The band made their live debut in October 1980 at the Compass Club in Bletchley supporting the local band the Flying Ducks. After their second gig at the Peartree Bridge Centre went badly, they decided to look beyond the confines of Milton Keynes and recorded their first demo at The Crypt, an eight-track studio in Stevenage, in January 1981. Another demo, In the Shadow of the Cross, was recorded in spring that year and garnered attention from the thriving underground network of zines and like-minded individuals including Andy Martin of the Apostles. Part 1 released the Funeral Parade EP in October 1982 on their own Paraworm Records and played their final show in April 1983, supporting the Subhumans at Oxford Street's 100 Club, where Leith split his bass drum skin. He left soon afterwards to join the London band the Snails. When Part 1 began to play live again in the 2010s over twenty years later, Chris Low replaced Bob Leith behind the drums.

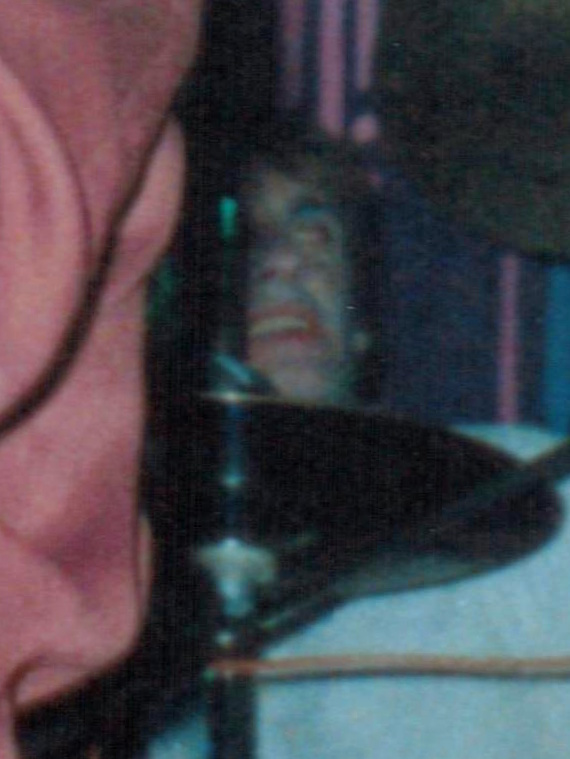
Leith became friends with Dominic Luckman (pictured in 1984) before replacing him after Luckman left Cardiacs.

Leith was the singer and drummer in the progressive pop band Ad Nauseam with guitarist Jon Poole, which had elements of Genesis and '80s rock. He and Poole were Cardiacs fans and followed them around on tour in 1989. Committed followers, Leith remembered "When I saw them for the first time it was like, 'Fucking hell – that's my new favourite band!' Before they'd even played a note, they had this presence. Jon and I hardly missed a gig for the next two or three years. We were obsessed." The band's manager invited them into a venue to watch Cardiacs soundcheck, where they met Cardiacs drummer Dominic Luckman and gave him a cassette tape containing Ad Nauseam songs after realising they shared similar musical interests. Luckman phoned them up to tell them he had enjoyed it and played it to the frontman Tim Smith and the rest of the band who all had loved and appreciated it. Leith and Poole became friends with Luckman and got to know the rest of the band over the next few months, becoming closer and closer friends.

At Leith's first show with Ad Nauseam, Smith came to see them and Luckman guested on drums for one song. Cardiacs guitarist Bic Hayes left the band at the same time Ad Nauseam had started doing live gigs and Poole called Smith asking for an audition a few days later, taking Hayes' place during the sessions of Heaven Born and Ever Bright in 1991. (Note: A 2003 Perfect Sound Forever article indicates that Leith also contributed to Heaven Born and Ever Bright. However, he is not credited and did not join Cardiacs until after its release.) Afterwards Poole tried to keep Ad Nauseam going but the band was torn apart by internal arguments, power struggles and jealousy; he vowed that he would come back for Leith and get him in Cardiacs but the two didn't talk for a year.

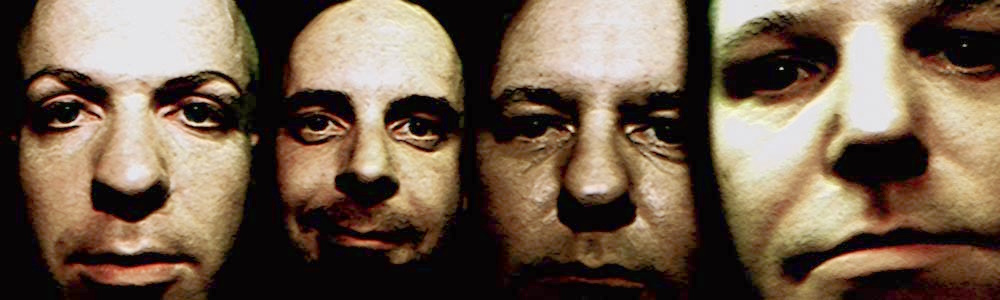
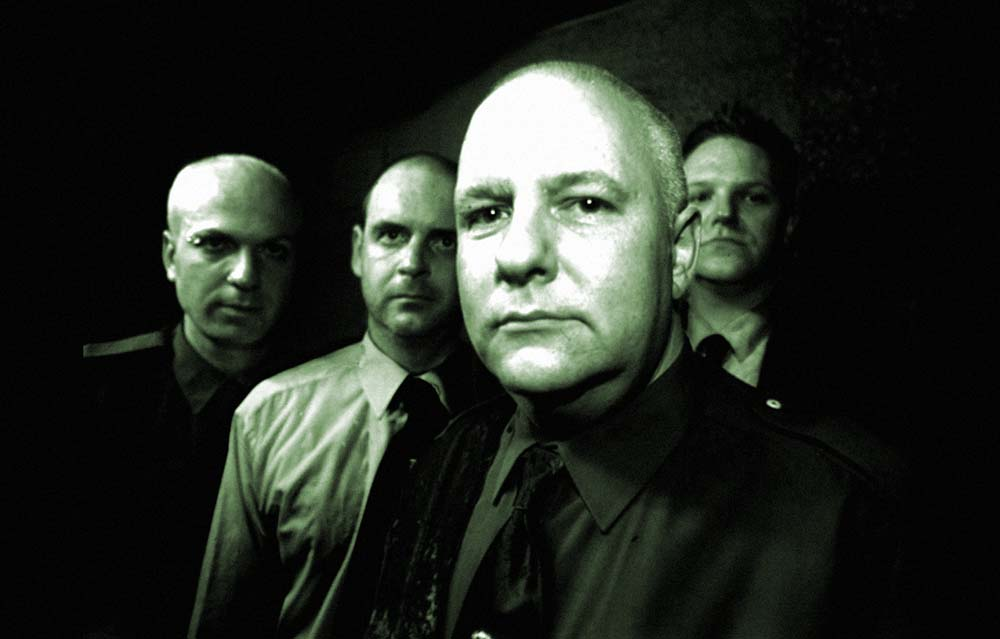
Cardiacs band photos. Left to right: Jon Poole, Leith, Jim Smith, Tim Smith

Luckman, Cardiacs' long-time drummer, was sick of the "deafening" click track required to play with tapes and departed on 20 July 1993. Poole was able to recruit Leith as Luckman's replacement who joined the band in December, with Leith reuniting with his former ally in Ad Nauseam. The lineup settled on the quartet of Tim Smith (guitar, keyboards, vocals), Jim Smith (bass, vocals), Poole (guitar, keyboards, vocals) and Leith (drums, vocals), with Cardiacs becoming a joint venture with Ad Nauseam. According to Sam Shepherd of MusicOMH, Bob "Babba" Leith's addition to the four-piece found Cardiacs their second "classic" lineup, or what many consider to be the "MkII" lineup. The band had little time to get him ready and debt from the collapse of Rough Trade forced the members to stay busy which lead to band downtime. Leith also played with the reformed Alternative TV in its 1995 and 1996 lineups. He collaborated on Cardiacs' 1996 album Sing to God, taking on some of the lyrics to help take the burden from Tim Smith who was growing wary of lyric writing, contributing to the songs "Eat It Up Worms Hero", "Dirty Boy" and "Nurses Whispering Verses".

On "Eat It Up Worms Hero", Smith and Leith lyrically create an uneasy narrative; Leith adds percussion on "Wireless" which gives the song drive to avoid ambient stasis. According to writer Eric Benac, Jim Smith and Leith keep "a perfect pace" on "Dirty Boy", for which Leith wrote "about 90 per cent" of the lyrics according to Poole. "Quiet as a Mouse" is a vocal interlude which allegedly features discovered conversations which were accidentally recorded when Tim and Jim Smith's mother visited while recording the album, discussing humorously whether to murder Leith. "Red Fire Coming Out from His Gills" features "heavy drums" from Leith causing dramatic tension, and a re-recording of "Nurses Whispering Verses" has Leith change the lyrics of the song slightly. The track "Manhoo" was released as a limited-run single with a smilling Bob Leith on the cover. The opening piano of the B-side "What Paradise Is Like" is pushed by Leith's insistent drum thump, before Leith and Jim fall into a fast-paced rhythm groove. Leith pushes the "Odd Even" B-side "Hurricanes" forward and the climax features "stop-and-start Leith-bashing". To learn the new Sing to God tracks, Poole and Leith were given cassette copies of early mixes.

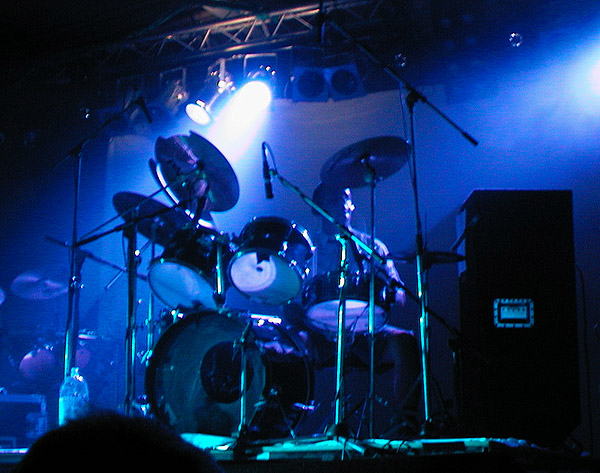
Leith with Cardiacs at Whitchurch Festival 2000

The four-piece stayed in place for Cardiacs' 1999 album Guns, with Leith on drumming duty. On the album, "Spell with a Shell" features a steady drum pound from Leith; the chorus of "There's Good Cud" pushes into pummeling drum rhythms, the drums becoming faster-paced in the second verse, with Benac noting Leith's bass drum skills as particularly important on the track. Leith's rhythm on "Wind and Rain Is Cold" is mixed loud, and Leith gets insistent as the music ups the ante in "Song of a Dead Pest", with tuned percussion providing melody and harmony. Leith and Jim Smith move through the twisting structure of the last track "Will Bleed Amen. Leith contributed vocals to the band Katherine in a Cupboard, which Jim Smith also played in. Their song "Building Cakes" was included on the 2001 compilation Cardiacs and Affectionate Friends, as Catherine in a Cupboard, and an album was in the making that was to be released on the recording label All My Eye and Betty Martin Music.

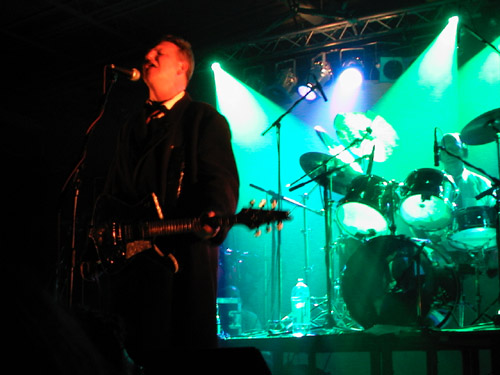
Leith (right) with Cardiacs at Whitchurch Festival 2000

In October 2003, Cardiacs played three consecutive concerts at The Garage in London where they performed more than 33 songs from their early years from 1977 to 1983. With a four-piece lineup up of Tim, Jim, Leith and newly welcomed guitarist Kavus Torabi replacing Poole, the best takes from the three-night stand were released in the two-hour 2005 live album The Special Garage Concerts as two different volumes. The live version of the song "A Game for Bartie's Party" is partially sung by Leith in a "deranged, most-likely drunk and haunting manner" according to Mike Vennart, giving way to other sections sung by Tim. Torabi and Leith were given free rein to do what they wanted with the songs, and Martijn Voorvelt of Perfect Sound Forever noted that learning the songs "must have been particularly hard work" for them as they were not in the original lineup.

The DVD Some Fairytales from the Rotten Shed, released in 2017, comprises Cardiacs' rehearsal footage filmed just prior to the 2003 concerts. A surrealist vein runs through the footage: the band is crammed into a tiny shack and constantly get in each other's way with Jim playing in his underwear fighting for space against one of Leith's cymbals not in use. At one point, Tim berates Leith for neglecting his drumming duties mid-song with a brusque "Twat!".

Leith was the drummer of the trio Blurt from 2005 to 2008, after long-time drummer Paul Wigens left the group. He made his debut with Blurt at the 2004 Glastonbury Festival's Friday JazzWorld Stage and recorded the tracks "Sweet Thames", "Hat" and "Cut It!" with the band which were released on the single "Cut It!" / "Hat" on 15 September 2008 and the album Cut It! in 2010.

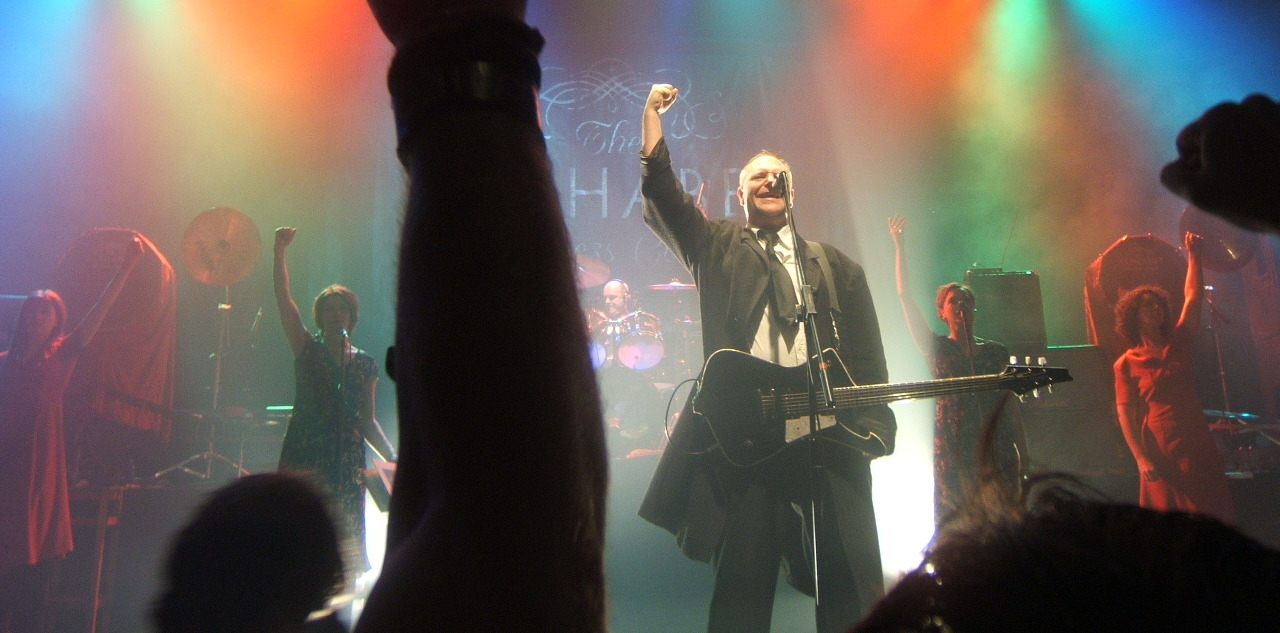
Leith (centre) with Cardiacs at the London Astoria in 2005

In 2005, Cardiacs' shows saw the group add three additional singers and two percussionists: Cathy Harabaras and Dawn Staple, to the lineup, who contributed drums with Leith. The extra percusion is featured on the 2007 single "Ditzy Scene" as Leith pounds a bass drum rhythm accompanied by a steady tambourine. Cardiacs, which had a lineup of Tim and Jim Smith, Torabi, Leith, Melanie Woods and Harabaras, stopped their activities in 2008 when Tim Smith was forced to retire from the scene due to neurological problems that caused him difficulty with speech, movement and muscle spasms which arose following a cardiac arrest. The release of their proposed next album, tentatively known as LSD, was delayed due to Smith's cardiac arrest, having been mostly recorded aside from Smith's vocals, On the single "Vermin Mangle", released digitally exclusively on Bandcamp after Smith's death in 2020, Leith acts the band's ever-present heartbeat for the percussion with Harabaras and Woods playing around his rhythm in fun and musical ways, according to Benac. Blurt drummer David Aylward made his debut with the band in 2008, taking the seat from Leith.

Leith has at times been the drummer of the band Spiritwo. Drummer Matt Riley joined the band when they played a gig with no drummer after Leith left using electronic beats, and Leith joined the band alongside Riley at their November 2015 single launch for the art-rock double A-side "Mesumamim" / "Face to Face". He guests on most tracks of Crayola Lectern's 2013 album The Fall and Rise of... which also includes Poole and Hayes, and featured in Mark Cawthra's psychedelic rock band Redbus Noface at Salisbury Arts Centre in 2016. The 2018 double album Real Estate/Fake Inverno by the Italian pop group Sterbus was made in cahoots with Leith and features his permanent presence in a guest appearance. Leith was the drummer of the Stephen Evens Band, the band of singer-songwriter Stephen Evens also known as Stephen Gilchrist. He was in the band for "a long while" including when they recorded the track "Hello, Salty Salty" which was released on Here Come the Lights in 2024.

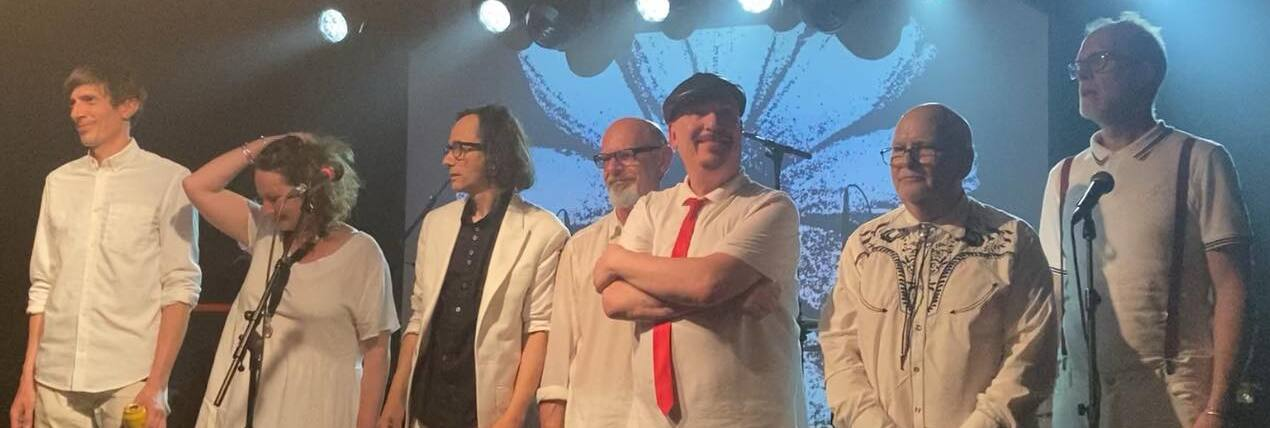
Leith (centre) with Cardiacs Family & Friends at The Garage in 2024

In 2019, Hayes put together Panixphere, a three piece band with Poole and Leith, which was initially Hayes' first band formed in 1983. The band was recording a studio album as of 2020 and mixed a live album recorded in December 2019. Leith returned to his drumstool with Cardiacs Family & Friends for the 2024 Sing to Tim gigs commemorating and celebrating Tim Smith at The Garage on 3 and 4 May, as well as Leeds’ Brudenell Social Club on 5 May in the Cardiacs Family lineup with Jim Smith as the rhythm section, along with Poole and Hayes, and aided by Craig Fortnam on percussion, Chloe Herington on saxophone and Adrien Rodes on keyboards. Following the gigs, four October dates were announced and Cardiacs performed a live session on Marc Riley and Gideon Coe’s BBC Radio 6 Music show, broadcast on 17 June. Leith said that it had become obvious they "all still had that thing" within the first run-through of 'The Duck and Roger the Horse', despite their advancing years.

Jim Smith said that Cardiacs kept working on LSD after Tim Smith's illness and death. The album, featuring Leith and other friends and associates of Cardiacs, was released in September 2025. Leith sang lead vocals on some tracks, which were mixed together with different singers' voices, where Tim Smith half-finished or hadn't started the recording of his own vocals. Former Oceansize and Empire State Bastard musician Mike Vennart (vocals), Rose-Ellen Kemp (vocals), and the late Tim Smith, joined Leith (vocals and drums), Jim Smith, and Torabi on the album. In 2025, the line-up of the band featured Jim Smith, Leith, Torabi, Fortnam, and Herington, with Vennart, Sharron Fortnam and Jayne Kay on vocals. On the back of the release of LSD, Cardiacs announced three live dates for March 2026.

== Musical style ==
In 2012 Mark Ferelli stated that Leith had "cut a legendary niche" for himself in his musical field. Jon Poole described Leith's drumming style as "unorthodox" to ImpattoSonoro, with his brother commenting "if I turned off the volume and only saw Bob playing without hearing him I would think he can't play!" Leith's arm is bent strangely since he broke it as a child, which is seen in his playing when he stretches out on the cymbals. Poole also said that Leith's "approach to the instrument is always at the service of the song", calling him "a great singer and a lover of special chords". Leith also plays keyboard in a "bizarre way" to write songs from instinct as "he has no idea what notes he is playing".

Eric Benac called Leith "a precise drummer possessed of a skilled musical mind" who "had a strong way with words" and "the missing puzzle piece" that Cardiacs needed to move forward as a power quartet. Benac noted how Leith's use of wordplay and "youthful sense of adventure and enthusiasm" in his lyrics made him a good foil for Tim Smith. Leith was a student of drum coach, mentor and musician Francis Seriau.

== Discography ==
With Part 1

- In the Shadow of the Cross (1981)
- Funeral Parade EP (1982)
- Pictures of Pain (1984)

With Ad Nauseam

- 4 Little Boys (1991)

With Ablemesh

- "Cancel Life" (1995) – 91 weekly Physical Singles Chart 2012
- Present Imperfect (2007)

With Cardiacs

Albums:

- Sing to God (1996)
- Guns (1999)
- Greatest Hits (2002) ("Faster Than Snakes with a Ball and a Chain")
- LSD (2025)

Live albums:

- The Special Garage Concerts (2005)
- Some Fairytales from the Rotten Shed (2017 DVD)

Singles:

- "Bellyeye" (1995)
- "Odd Even" (1996)
- "Manhoo" (1996)
- Cardiacs/Camp Blackfoot (1999)
- "Signs" (1999)
- "Ditzy Scene" (2007)
- "Vermin Mangle" (2020)
- Cardiacs E.P. (2025) ("Faster Than Snakes with a Ball and a Chain")
- "Woodeneye" (2025)
- "Downup" (2025)
- "Volob" (2025)

With Katherine in a Cupboard

- If You Break It, It's Yours! (1997)
- "Building Cakes" (2001, Cardiacs and Affectionate Friends)

With Leisur Hive

- 3 Ton Edition (2004)
- On Sectional Pad EP (2005)

With William D. Drake

- Briny Hooves (2007)

With Blurt

- "Cut It!" / "Hat" (single, 2008)
- Cut It! (2010) ("Cut It!", "Hat" and "Sweete Thames")
- My Mother Was a Friend of an Enemy of the People (2024) ("Enemy Ears") (Note: Recorded live at the Stubnitz, 2006; restored/remastered using AI.)

With Crayola Lectern

- The Fall and Rise of... (2013)
- Happy Endings (2018)

With Dr Brighton

- The self titled 1995 album from Dr Brighton. (2016)

With Stephen EvEns

- "Two Bites of Cherry" (2017)
- Here Come the Lights (2024) ("Hello, Salty Salty")

With Sterbus

- Real Estate / Fake Inverno (2018)
- Solar Barbecue (2022) ("Razor Legs", "Ruben, Raja, Lieve, Nike")

With Panixphere

- Confinement/release6 (2020)
- Gods and Zeros (2026)

With Spratleys

- Bloom (2026) ("Jade", "Gold Place")
