= Vermin Mangle =

2020 single by Cardiacs

Single by Cardiacs
- Released: 1 September 2020
- Genre: Circus; progressive rock; psychedelia
- Length: 6:09
- Label: Alphabet Business Concern
- Songwriter: Tim Smith

Cardiacs singles chronology
"Ditzy Scene" (2007)	"Vermin Mangle" (2020)	"Woodeneye" (2025)

"Vermin Mangle" is a song by English rock band Cardiacs. The song was written by Tim Smith, who played it live during solo performances in 2000 and 2006, and was supposed to be the final track of the album LSD which was left unfinished after Smith had a heart attack in 2008. Following Smith's death, it was released as a free download on 1 September 2020 through the band's Bandcamp page as the second single from the album, to mark his funeral that same day. Intended as a thank you to the group's fans, the song features the circus, progressive rock and psychedelic instrumentation that drove much of the band's work.

"Vermin Mangle" received positive reviews from music critics, with some commenting on the lyrics and sombre atmosphere. The full song was heard on bootlegs shared by Smith to keep testament of its progress, and the studio version first shared publicly on 30 July 2020 during Steve Davis' Phoenix FM tribute show.

== History ==
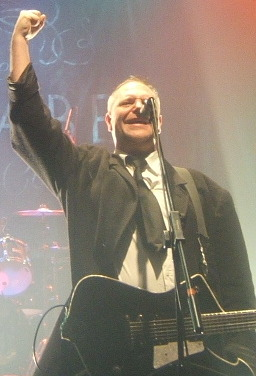
Smith performing at the London Astoria in 2005

Tim Smith only played "Vermin Mangle" live a handful of times during his rare forays into solo performance in 2000 and 2006. Playing Upstairs at the Garage for the Organ in 2000, Smith was nervous. He looked up at the ceiling and grinned, which Sean Worral attributed to an audience of rats "running back and forward above his head on some kind of skanky lattice thing suspended from the rafters", meaning he had premiered the song to actual vermin. Smith shared bootlegs of the full song with Organ to keep testament of its progress.

Cardiacs recorded a version of "Vermin Mangle" for their album LSD in 2008, completing it before Smith recorded vocals for the other tracks. It was supposed to be the final track on the album, which was left unfinished after Smith had a heart attack in 2008. The song was only remembered as "Vermin Mangle" because it was Smith's working title, and was known for years as "Dream Dress" before its release.

== Release and promotion ==
In 2007, Cardiacs released "Ditzy Scene", the lead single from LSD. Whilst performing on Marc Riley's BBC 6 Music radio show, Smith confirmed the upcoming release of two singles from the album, scheduled for August and November 2008. After his heart attack and death in 2020, the album remained unfinished. The studio version of "Vermin Mangle" was first shared publicly on 30 July 2020 during Steve Davis' Tim Smith tribute show on Phoenix FM. The song was officially released on 1 September 2020 to mark Smith's funeral which was held the same day. It was released by the band's record label, the Alphabet Business Concern, as a free download through their Bandcamp page at midnight, intended as a thank you to the group's fans. It was their first single and release of new material since "Ditzy Scene" in 2007.

== Critical reception ==
"Vermin Mangle" was met with positive reviews from music critics. Reviewing an unreleased version of the track on one of Tim's cassettes, Sean Kitching of The Quietus called it "a beautiful piece of music, initially serene and eventually epic", comparing it to "In the Neighbourhood" by Tom Waits and the funeral hymn "Morning Has Broken". Kitching noted that the song's opening lyrics — "Think of a way, then always go your own way / Uncustomary evenings, legendary mornings / Louder than drums and softer than a cloud that's been blown away" — were a good "closing summation on a unique life well-lived". Following its release, He commented that the song was "totally Tim Smith", bringing attention to "the myriad little sonic details that make up the vivid picture it conjures in the listener's mind". According to BrooklynVegan's Andrew Sacher, the song features the circus, progressive rock and psychedelic instrumentation that "drove the band's most classic work". Sacher wrote that the song was "on the more somber, atmospheric side" but "unmistakably the work of Tim Smith". Chloe Ross of Backseat Mafia named the song a "poignant farewell". Dom Lawson in Classic Rock included the song in his Essential Playlist.

== Personnel ==
According to Eric Benac:

- Tim Smith – vocals, keyboards, guitar
- Jim Smith – vocals, bass
- Kavus Torabi – vocals, guitar
- Bob Leith – drums, vocals
- Cathy Harabaras – vocals, percussion
- Melanie Woods – vocals, percussion
- Suzanne Kirby and Claire Lemon [sic] – vocals
