= Amount to Nothing =

Amount To Nothing

Studio album by Yakuza
- Released: October 31, 2000
- Recorded: May 12–14, 2000
- Studio: Ghetto Love Recording
- Genres: Post-hardcore, avant-garde metal
- Length: 38:07
- Label: self-released
- Producer: Dale Meiners

Yakuza chronology
Amount To Nothing (2000)	Way of the Dead (2002)

Amount to Nothing is the debut album from the band Yakuza. It was self-released on October 31, 2000.

== Track listing ==
1. "Vessel (On)" – 1:39
2. "Sweetest Day" – 2:35
3. "Copremisis" – 3:07
4. "Turkish Goggles" – 6:02
5. "Signal" – 2:13
6. "Ender" – 5:23
7. "The Stranger" – 3:14
8. "Angry Dragon" – 3:07
9. "Vessel (Off)" – 7:06
