= Way of the Dead =

Studio album by Yakuza
- Released: 2002
- Genre: Avant-garde metal; progressive metal; alternative metal
- Length: 69:30
- Label: Century Media Records

Yakuza chronology
Amount to Nothing (2000)	Way of the Dead (2002)	Samsara (2006)

Professional ratings
Review scores
Source	Rating
AllMusic	3/5 stars

Way of the Dead is the second studio album by Yakuza, released in 2002. It marks a distinct departure from the post-hardcore sound of their debut, with a more experimental approach, fusing elements of alternative metal, sludge metal, hardcore and jazz. Some refer to this eclectic sound as "jazzcore". The second half of the album is composed entirely of the 43-minute track "01000011110011", an extended electric avant-jazz jam.

== Track listing ==
No.	Title	Length
1.	"Vergasso"	5:09
2.	"Miami Device"	3:55
3.	"Yama"	3:39
4.	"Signal 2.42"	1:51
5.	"T.M.S."	3:37
6.	"Chicago Typewriter"	4:28
7.	"Obscurity"	4:46
8.	"01000011110011"	43:25
Total length:		69:30

== Personnel ==
- Bruce Lamont - vocals, saxophones, clarinet, effects
- Matt McClelland - guitars, vocals
- Jackson - bass
- James Staffel - drums, percussion, keyboards
