= Sidi Bou Said (band) =

English alternative rock band

Background information
- Origin: Lewisham, London, England
- Genres: Alternative rock; riot grrrl; folk-pop; art-punk
- Years active: 1990–1998; 2005; 2010
- Label: Ultimate Recording Company
- Past members: Claire Lemmon; Gayl Harrison; Melanie Woods; Lee Howton
- Website: anyware.co.uk/sbs

Sidi Bou Said (Note: Pronounced "Siddy Boo Sigh", according to The Encyclopedia of Popular Music.) were a British rock band formed in 1990 by Claire Lemmon (guitar and vocals), Lee Howton (guitar and vocals), Gayl Harrison (bass guitar) and Melanie Woods (drums and vocals). Their music combined an indie rock/folk sound with complex arrangements and literate lyrics. They were often compared to Throwing Muses and the Pixies, with whom they shared a taste for sometimes uncomfortable lyrical themes—murder, religion, the workings of the human body and surrealist stories and films. Their name comes from a town in Tunisia.

Sidi Bou Said's debut album was produced by Tim Friese-Greene. Their next two albums were produced by members of Cardiacs, and they were regular contributors to their stage shows and recordings. In 2001, they briefly reformed, with an additional guitarist under the name Tetra, and played a one-off reunion gig as Sidi Bou Said on 15 December 2005 at The Water Rats, London.

== History ==
Sidi Bou Said was formed in 1990 by guitarist and vocalist Claire Lemmon, guitarist and vocalist Lee Howton, bass guitarist Gayl Harrison and drummer and vocalist Melanie Woods. Howton left the band in summer 1994. (Note: "Lee Howton | Discography". Discogs. 17 July 2009. Note: Click "Edit Artist" for source (version of page unarchived).) All four women are from south-east London, England. Their name comes from a town in Tunisia.

In 1993, Sidi Bou Said's first single, "Twilight Eyes" was released with a music video for MTV. On 1 November 1993, Sidi Bou Said released their debut album, Broooch, recorded at Chapel Studios and Ed's Plaice. It was produced by Tim Friese-Greene, described by AllMusic as "among the most innovative — albeit underrecognized — producers of his era". Tim Friese-Greene and Lee Howton later became a couple, marrying in 2004 with Lee becoming Lee Friese-Greene.

Sidi Bou Said were guests on Moonshake's second full length project in 1994.

Sidi Bou Said released their second album Bodies in 1995. According to AllMusic's John Bush, the album "shows the group as staunch environmentalists and concerned with women's issues, while still displaying their own British wit and identity." That year, the band Cardiacs recorded their album Sing to God (1996) after returning from a tour with Sidi Bou Said, which Tim Smith was producing; on the album, the song "Dog Like Sparky" is the first of several to feature backing vocals from Lemmon.

Sidi Bou Said released their third and final studio album, Obsessive, in 1997.

== Post break-up ==
After Sidi Bou Said disbanded in 1998, Lemmon recorded a solo album, Clearner, released in 1999 on BoogleWonderland Records. The album includes Woods on drums and was engineered by Harrison.

In 2001, the final line-up of Sidi Bou Said briefly formed a new band with an additional guitarist under the name Tetra. Woods subsequently joined the North Sea Radio Orchestra, a contemporary chamber group formed in October 2002 by composer Craig Fortnam and his wife Sharron. She performed vocals on the ensemble's first two albums—North Sea Radio Orchestra (2006) and Birds (2008)—as part of the North Sea Chorus, which drew plaudits from classical publications and indie music magazines.

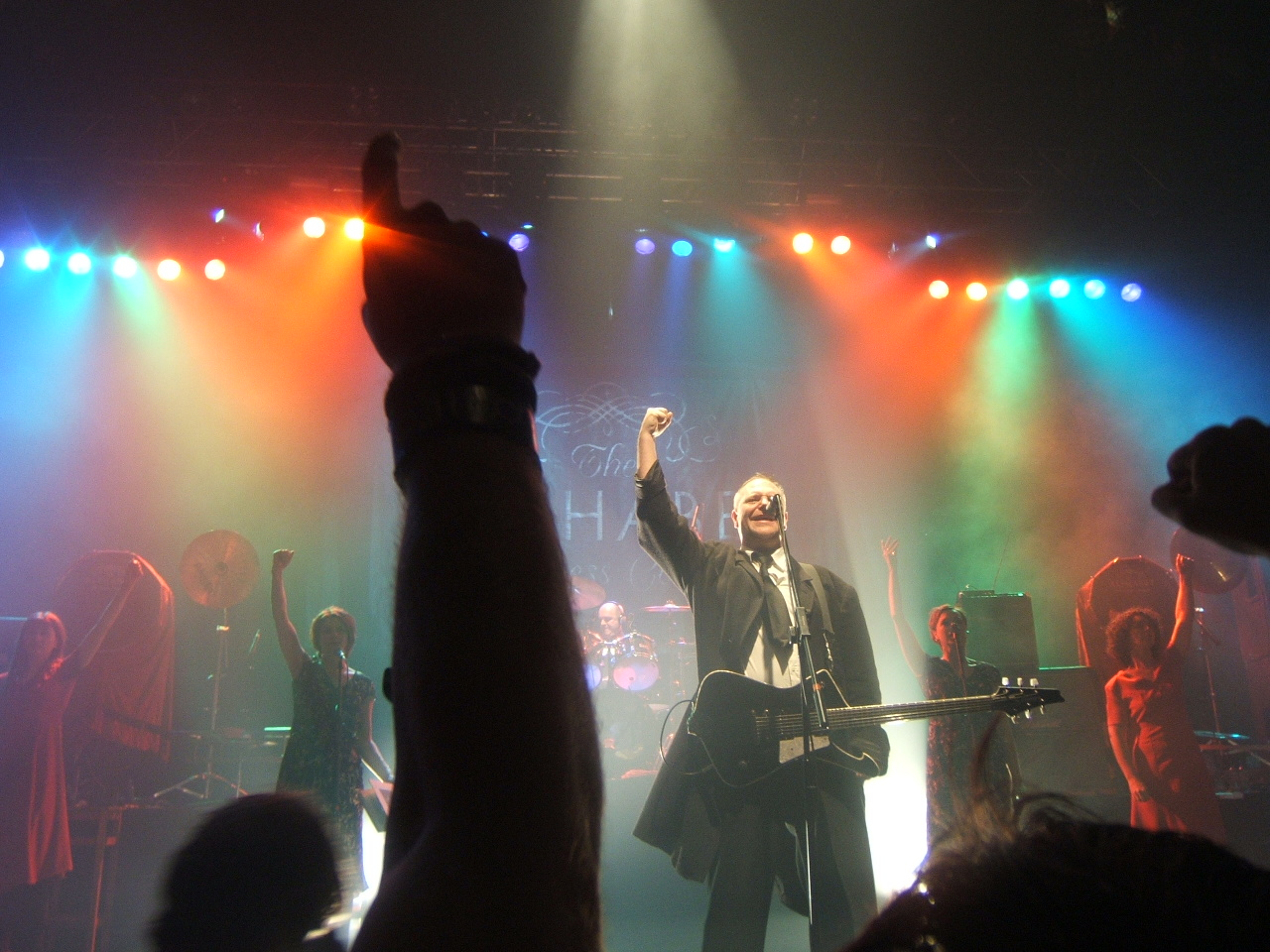
Melanie Woods (second from left) and Claire Lemmon (second from right) performing with Cardiacs at the London Astoria on 11 November 2005

In 2004, Lemmon and Woods joined the expanded Cardiacs line-up as vocalists alongside Sharron Fortnam and percussionists Cathy Harabaras and Dawn Staple. The band started work on new compositions and recordings for an album provisionally titled LSD, releasing the single "Ditzy Scene" in 2007 and touring until winter of that year. Tim Smith, Cardiacs' leader, had a cardiac arrest on 25 June 2008 which left him with the condition dystonia, leaving LSD unfinished. Woods was in the band's formation when they stopped their activities that year.

Sidi Bou Said recorded for the album Leader of the Starry Skies: A Tribute to Tim Smith, Songbook 1 (2010).

In 2020, Tim Friese-Greene and Lee Friese-Greene formed the group Short-Haired Domestic. They released the double A-side single "A Song in Latin... A Song in Hindi" on 5 June, featuring the tracks "A Song in Latin About the Importance of Comfortable Shoes" and "A Song in Hindi for Insomniacs" as preview of the duo's eponymous album. On 30 March 2021, Cleaner was reissued on Bandcamp.

== Members ==
- Claire Lemmon – guitar, vocals (1990–1998, 2005, 2010)
- Gayl Harrison – bass guitar (1990–1998, 2005, 2010)
- Melanie Woods – drums, vocals (1990–1998, 2005, 2010)
- Lee Howton – vocals, guitar (1991–1994)

== Discography ==
=== Albums ===
Title	Album details	Notes
Broooch	Released: 1 November 1993; Label: Ultimate Records TOPPLP005/TOPPCD005; Track listing: 1. "Urge"; 2. "My Cat Is My Bridesmaid"; 3. "Handstand"; 4. "Goblin Market"; 5. "Thing"; 6. "Glassmouth"; 7. "Taste"; 8. "Terrible Secret"; 9. "Mary Mary"; 10. "Dracula"; 11. "Three Sides"; 12. "Fallow"	The first 1000 LPs came with a free 7 inch "Vapona" / "River Man" - TOPPLP005S
Bodies	Released: 1995; Label: Ultimate Records TOPPLP034/TOPPCD034; Track listing: 1. "Hyde"; 2. "Practise Walking"; 3. "Wormee"; 4. "Magnet"; 5. "Bovary"; 6. "Big Yellow Taxidermist"; 7. "Ode to Drink"; 8. "Brittle"; 9. "Lefthanded"; 10. "Slitty Gap"; 11. "Nurse"; 12. "Sicky Vomit"	The first 1000 LPs came in a gatefold sleeve with lyrics - TOPPLP034S
Entertain	Released: 1995; Label: Ultimate Records TOPPMLP040; Track listing: 1. "Buzz"; 2. "Magnet"; 3. "Slitty Gap"; 4. "Goblin Market"; 5. "Ode to Drink"; 6. "Big Yellow Taxidermist"	Limited edition LP recorded live at The Garage, London 31 August 1995
Obsessive	Released: 1997; Label: Ultimate Records TOPPLP053/TOPPCD053; Track listing: 1. "Obsessive"; 2. "Like You"; 3. "Stopper"; 4. "Funnybody"; 5. "Zazie (Dans Le Metro)"; 6. "Minotaur"; 7. "Harold and Maude"; 8. "Bridge Song"; 9. "Bella"; 10. "Rat King"; 11. "Seems Undone"; 12. "20,000 Horses"	The CD was packaged in a jewel case that has a small six-sided die in the spine. The CD booklet folds out so that the lyrics & album information are on one side, and on the back is a game board for "OBSESSIVE: A game of death and paranoia for 2 to 6 players". There is also an insert with 6 rat-shaped playing pieces you can cut out for playing the game.

=== Singles ===
- "Twilight Eyes" (1993 Ultimate Records TOPP014)
- "Buzz" / "Faster" on limited edition 7 inch/CD; c/w Buzz/Faster/Glow-Worm (live) on 12 inch
- "Three Sides" (1993 Ultimate Records TOPP017); c/w Romp on 7 inch; c/w Romp/Wild on 12 inch/CD
- "Thing" (1994 Ultimate Records TOPP023); c/w Lukewarm on 7 inch; c/w Lukewarm/These Things on CD
- "Wormee" (1995 Ultimate Records TOPP031); c/w Throwing Myself Off A Building (acoustic)/On My Tongue (acoustic)/My Secret Garden (acoustic) on 10 inch; c/w Slitty Gap/Throwing Myself Off A Building (acoustic) on CD
- "Ode To Drink" (1995 Ultimate Records TOPP037); c/w Faster (acoustic) on 7 inch; c/w Blood/Faster (plus vite) on CD
- "Funnybody" (radio edit) (1996 Ultimate Records TOPP050); c/w Red Bus Rover on 7 inch picture disc; c/w Fishy/Funnybody on CD
- "Like You" (1997 Ultimate Records TOPP057); c/w Obsessive/New Skin/Long, Long, Long on CD1; c/w Obsessive/Head in Sand/Sylvie on CD2
