= Of Seismic Consequence =

Studio album by Yakuza
- Released: June 22, 2010
- Genre: Avant-garde metal, progressive metal, jazz metal, art metal
- Length: 51:55
- Label: Profound Lore Records
- Producer: Sanford Parker

Yakuza chronology
Transmutations (2007)	Of Seismic Consequence (2010)	Beyul (2012)

Professional ratings
Review scores
Source	Rating
AllMusic	4.5/5 stars
Hellbound.ca	9.5/10
Pitchfork	7.7/10
PopMatters	8/10

Of Seismic Consequence is the fifth full-length studio album by Chicago-based progressive metal band Yakuza. It was released on June 22, 2010 by Profound Lore Records.

== Track listing ==
1. "The Ant People" – 3:48
2. "Thinning the Herd" – 3:37
3. "Stones and Bones" – 5:40
4. "Be That As It May" – 8:10
5. "Farewell to the Flesh" – 11:12
6. "Testing the Waters" – 6:27
7. "Good Riddance (Knuckle Walkers)" – 2:59
8. "The Great War" – 2:44
9. "Deluge" – 7:18

== Personnel ==
- Bruce Lamont – saxophone, vocals
- James Staffel – drums
- Matt McClelland – guitar, vocals
- Ivan Cruz – bass guitar
