= Beyul (album) =

Studio album by Yakuza
- Released: October 22, 2012
- Genre: Avant-garde metal, progressive metal, grindcore, sludge metal, art metal
- Length: 38:46
- Label: Profound Lore Records

Yakuza chronology
Of Seismic Consequence (2010)	Beyul (2012)	Sutra (2023)

Professional ratings
Review scores
Source	Rating
Pitchfork	7.0/10
Consequence	C+

Beyul is the sixth full-length studio album by Chicago-based progressive metal band Yakuza. It was released on October 22, 2012, by Profound Lore Records.

== Track listing ==
1. "Oil and Water" – 4:22
2. "The Last Day" – 5:50
3. "Man is Machine" – 8:28
4. "Fire Temple and Beyond" – 9:55
5. "Mouth of the Lion" – 2:14
6. "Species" – 1:25
7. "Lotus Array" – 6:32

== Personnel ==
- Bruce Lamont – saxophone, vocals
- James Staffel – drums
- Matt McClelland – guitar, vocals
- Ivan Cruz – bass guitar
