= Samsara (Yakuza album) =

Studio album by Yakuza
- Released: March 21, 2006
- Genres: Avant-garde metal; progressive metal; alternative metal
- Length: 50:10
- Label: Prosthetic Records
- Producer: Sanford Parker

Yakuza chronology
Way of the Dead (2002)	Samsara (2006)	Transmutations (2007)

Professional ratings
Review scores
Source	Rating
AllMusic	4/5 stars
Punknews	4/5 stars
Blabbermouth	8/10 stars
PopMatters	7/10
Scene Point Blank	8.8/10
Scream Magazine	5/6 stars

Samsara is the third studio album by Yakuza and their first for Prosthetic Records. Furthering the departure from their debut, which displayed a more stripped-down post-hardcore style, Samsara, like Way of the Dead, is more eclectic and progressive; their experimental metal style assimilating Bruce Lamont's saxophone for a unique sound that some would label "jazzcore." Mastodon's Troy Sanders performs guest vocals on the final track, "Back To The Mountain."

== Track listing ==
1. "Cancer of Industry" – 3:02
2. "Plecostomus" – 3:38
3. "Monkeytail" – 5:24
4. "Transmission Ends... Signal Lost" – 1:27
5. "Dishonor" – 5:20
6. "20 Bucks" – 5:02
7. "Exterminator" – 7:26
8. "Just Say Know" – 2:58
9. "Glory Hole" – 6:57
10. "Back to the Mountain" – 9:02

== Personnel ==
- Bruce Lamont - vocals, saxophones, clarinet, effects
- Matt McClelland - guitars, vocals
- John E. Bohmer - bass
- James Staffel - drums, percussion, keyboards

Guest Musicians

- Sanford Parker - effects (6)
- Jim Baker - piano (9)
- Troy Sanders - vocals (10)
- Fred Lonberg-Holm - cello
