= LSD (Cardiacs album) =

2025 studio album by Cardiacs

Studio album by Cardiacs
- Released: 19 September 2025
- Recorded: 2007–2008; 2021–2024
- Studio: Apollo 8
- Genre: Progressive rock
- Length: 80:11
- Label: Alphabet Business Concern
- Producers: Jim Smith; Tim Smith; Kavus Torabi

Cardiacs chronology
The Special Garage Concerts (2005)	LSD (2025)

Singles from LSD
- 1. "Woodeneye" Released: 1 August 2025; 2. "Downup" Released: 29 August 2025; 3. "Volob" Released: 17 September 2025

LSD is the sixth studio album by the English rock band Cardiacs, (Note: A Little Man and a House and the Whole World Window (1988) is considered to be the band's first proper studio album. LSD is Cardiacs' ninth album if their cassette only releases The Obvious Identity (1980), Toy World (1981) and The Seaside (1984) are taken into account.) released on 19 September 2025. Recording began in 2007 following lineup changes, with the "Ditzy Scene" EP released by Org Records to tease the album. It was originally planned to be released in October 2008, with planned singles in August and November, an autumn tour, a radio session with Marc Riley and a reissue of the concert film All That Glitters Is a Mares Nest (1992).

Production was indefinitely postponed after frontman Tim Smith had a cardiac arrest and stroke on 25 June 2008 resulting in his dystonia, leaving him unable to play or provide vocals. Over the next 12 years, the lyrics and compositions for each of the songs on the album were established by Tim's family and friends communicating with him via the position of his eyes and his left hand, using an alphabet board, with Tim's brother Jim Smith completing the album in his stead. Fundraiser gigs, namely charity concerts entitled "The Alphabet Business Convention", were arranged and tribute albums were recorded to aid Smith in rehabilitation, and to help him to complete work on the album and other musical projects. He died on 21 July 2020 of what was deemed to be another heart attack.

Between 2021 and 2024, Jim resumed recording for the album with a large cast of family and friends based on all of the guidance Tim had created. The album features numerous choral vocals from contributors such as Mike Vennart, Rose-Ellen Kemp and drummer Bob Leith to give the effect of Tim's voice and vocal style.

== Background and recording ==
=== 1999-2007: Post-Guns aborted recordings and lineup changes ===
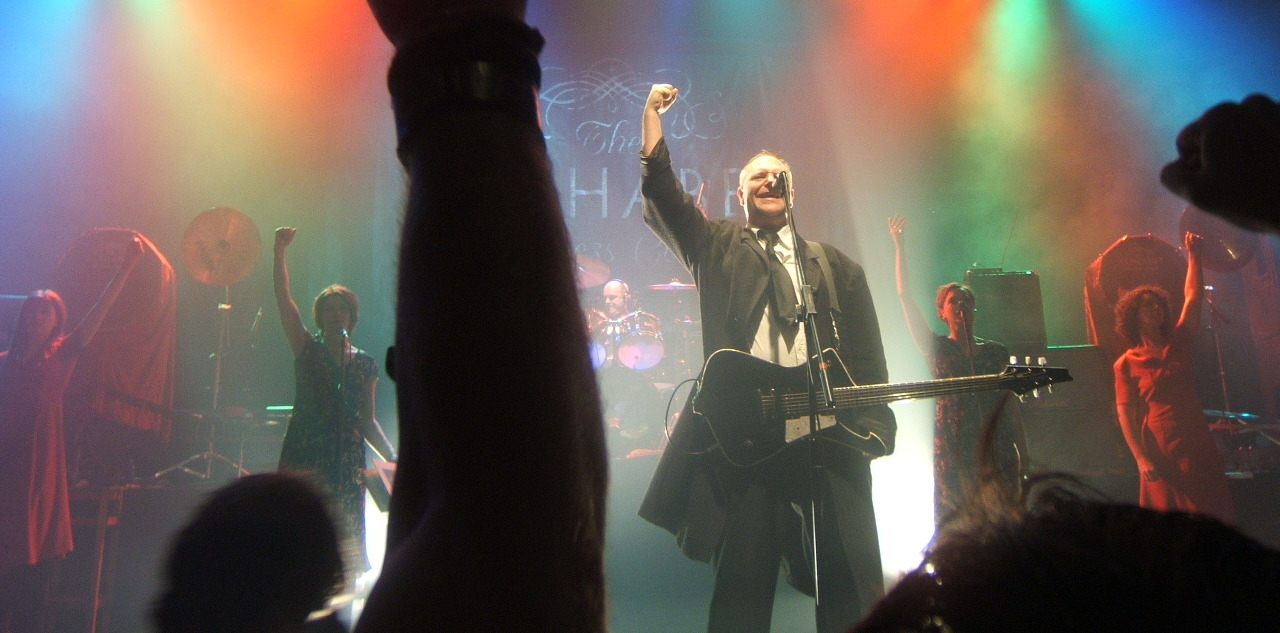
Cardiacs performing in 2005

At some point between 1999 and 2003, Cardiacs began work on a new studio album, which would have included unreleased songs from the Sing to God and Guns sessions like "Faster Than Snakes with a Ball and a Chain", (which would appear on Greatest Hits (2002)), (Note: Torabi recounts "Faster Than Snakes" being made around the time of Sing to God (1996), clarifying that it was never meant to be released on LSD.) live favourite "Silvery", "Shiprot", and others, as well as new songs like "Vermin Mangle" (performed by Tim Smith in solo live shows, with a studio recording released after Smith's passing). Some elements of these sessions remain on or were considered for LSD. In October 2005, Smith told questioner Rob Aird that the band had been working on a follow-up album to Guns (1999) from "about 1999–2000". Smith went on to say that "things got broken and we couldn't finish the album", explaining: "I won't re-record things once they have been started because too much of the atmosphere and god knows what else is lost." Smith hinted that the band "might put it out one day as it was left" but confirmed they had moved on to new tracks. (Note: On the Progressive Ears forum, Kavus Torabi says that the lost follow-up album is apocryphal, though a few songs exist.) Accounts vary on the timeline and substance of these album sessions.

Following the release of Greatest Hits, several changes occurred within the Cardiacs lineup. Guitarist Jon Poole was replaced in 2003 by former guitar technician Kavus Torabi, previously known as a founding member of the Cardiacs-influenced The Monsoon Bassoon. In 2004, the band's lineup expanded further to include vocalists Claire Lemmon and Melanie Woods of Sidi Bou Said, Sharron Fortnam of the North Sea Radio Orchestra, and percussionists Cathy Harabaras and Dawn Staple. Smith, Lemmon and Woods had previously worked together when Smith had produced Sidi Bou Said's Bodies album, with Lemmon subsequently providing backing vocals for the song "Dog Like Sparky" on Cardiacs' album Sing to God (1996). During this period, Cardiacs continued to tour, recorded The Special Garage Concerts live album, and filmed Some Fairytales from the Rotten Shed.

=== 2007-2008: First phase of activity; initial recording and Ditzy Scene EP ===
We were ruminating on the album title in a pub in Salisbury. I said: 'Tim, I've got it - LSD'. We were sat outside, around the end of May. He came back from the bar and he was like 'I've been thinking about it. Absolutely. We've got to do it.' And that was it. My rationale was just the blatancy of it. We are making psychedelic music, we all know we are. Why fuck about? Let's just get on with it.

— Kavus Torabi

Work on the album started proper in 2007 when Tim Smith sent Kavus Torabi three CDs worth of compositional material and asked him to pick his favorites to start recording. The first track Torabi picked was "Ditzy Scene", which became the first song written by the band's new lineup. An EP with two additional songs, "Gen" and "Made All Up", was hastily planned and recorded at Smith's own recording studio Apollo 8 in Autumn 2007, located at Tim and Jim Smith's childhood home in Chessington. Both Torabi and Smith expressed excitement for the material, but were "not mad" on the EP's rushed mix, resulting in Torabi having less involvement for the arrangements. The EP coincided with a tour. On the tour, Torabi recalled that "The crowds were getting bigger and younger and something was definitely happening", adding that Tim's brother and bass player Jim Smith said "something was in the air, that this might be our time."

Cardiacs began further work on LSD following the 2007 tour. Tracks "The May" and "Spelled All Wrong" were finalised and had Tim's vocals fully recorded: these are used in the final album. The composition and lyrics for "Skating", a collaboration with Jo Spratley that was inspired by Mr Bungle's California originated from the early 2000s and was finalised in 2008, with the band preparing to perform it live for their planned tour later that year. Torabi had "never known [Smith] to be as productive as the time [Cardiacs] were making [LSD]." According to Torabi in 2009, the band "came pretty close to completing the recording" and "were so busy on it at the time of Tim's heart attack and subsequent stroke that [Torabi] never bothered to get desk mixes."

In summer 2008, LSD was almost ready and due to be released in October. On 23 June, Cardiacs performed three songs live on Marc Riley's BBC 6 Music radio show. Years later, Riley, who confessed a predilection for the band, opined that it was "probably the last time Cardiacs will ever perform." Lemmon, Staple and Sharron Fortnam were no longer in the Cardiacs lineup by then. There were plans for another session, two new singles and a ten-date November tour. On 6 Music, Tim Smith elaborated that the singles would release in August and November along with a DVD reissue of the concert film All That Glitters Is a Mares Nest (1992) in September.

=== 2008-2015: Tim Smith's paralysis and band hiatus ===
All work on LSD abruptly stopped when Tim Smith was hospitalised on 25 June 2008. Having attended the last night of My Bloody Valentine's comeback residency at the Roundhouse in London, Smith had gone for a drink with former Cardiacs guitarist Bic Hayes before heading off in the early hours to meet friends, subsequently suffering a heart attack and an episode of cerebral anoxia in a north London street, which in turn triggered a major stroke. Smith was treated in intensive care at University College Hospital, but was thought to have had a second stroke in hospital a few days later as he recuperated. He was eventually diagnosed with the rare neurological condition dystonia, which causes muscles to contract uncontrollably, and was left both paralysed down one side of the body and unable to speak. Denied movement and speech, Smith was forced to retire from live performances and LSD remained unfinished.

In a 2009 interview, Torabi said that LSD would eventually release, but it was "the last thing on [their] minds". On 13 December 2010, the tribute album Leader of the Starry Skies: A Tribute to Tim Smith, Songbook 1 was released, compiling covers made by artists close to Smith, members of Cardiacs, and those inspired by the band. (Note: Other tribute albums include The Whole World Window (I and II; 2016 and 2018) produced by Hayes, Singin' to God (2018) by the 180 Gs—a barbershop version of Sing to God, and Casio Cardiacs (2020) by the Gathering Doubt—an EP that reinterprets some of the band's classics in chiptune.) Other fundraising initiatives were formed, including gigs—above all the charity concert "The Alphabet Business Convention" held on three occasions between 2013 and 2017. Proceeds from reprints and special editions went towards Smith's rehabilitation, including the 2015 box set The Seaside: Original Edition.

=== 2016-2020: Second phase of activity and Tim's final tasks ===
I said to Tim 'we should finish LSD, get back in the studio', because I thought it would be a good thing to do. It would cheer him up and use his brain, doing something musical.

A lot of the rough mixes didn't have any melodies on them, they were just bass, drums, guitars and keyboards, no singing, so I'd record the melodies over the top with my Philicorda organ and send them to Tim to check if they were correct. Some of the songs had no lyrics at all. So to start, Tim said 'go into my words folder and stick some words to the melodies', which is what I did for "A Roll from a Dirty Place" and "Volob".

— Craig Fortnam

Due to Smith's illness, it was thought that LSD would remain a famous lost album. However, Smith was able to oversee the completion of another of his musical projects, the Sea Nymphs' second album, On the Dry Land (2016), after significant progress with recovery. Torabi stated in an interview that LSD was "nearly done but needs vocals and eyebrows", adding that there were talks of people who Smith would approve of adding vocals under his direction. In January 2018, a fundraising drive was launched to help fund Smith's medical bills, initially set at £40,000. The effort was supported by Faith No More founder and bassist Billy Gould, Shane Embury of Napalm Death, Voivod guitarist Dan Mongrain, and Ginger Wildheart. Quickly exceeding the original goal, the JustGiving campaign updated to raise £100,000—enough to provide Smith a year of home care and a chance of recuperation. Later that year, Smith was awarded an honorary degree as Doctor of Music from the Royal Conservatoire of Scotland. There was talk of him moving back to his home full-time and being able to oversee the completion of LSD, which was eventually realised.

During this new period of Tim's lucidity, Craig Fortnam suggested to Jim Smith that they try to finish LSD, to which Jim accepted, renovating Tim's home studio which had sat unused for 10 years. In this period, Tim's movements were restricted either to pointing his eyes at letters of the alphabet on a board or (after rehabilitation) writing using the movement of his left hand, making communication incredibly slow, but through this Tim was able to direct further work on LSD, signing off on everything but final mixes, which he was never able to hear, although he regularly would listen to in-progress material. The lyrics for "Volob" were made up of snippets of texts that Tim's partner at the time of his accident, Suzy Kirby, had sent to him. The process of re-organising all of the manuscripts containing the album's compositions was long and arduous for Fortnam, but unearthed many pieces of material that were previously thought lost, such as "Busty Beez" and "Breed". The final addition to the album Tim approved were the lyrics to "Pet Fezant", a few days before his death, which he made adamant he wanted on the album. Fortnam acknowledged in a 2025 interview that the album probably "would have been impossible to finish if Tim hadn't died", since "Tim would have been vehement about what he wanted, but it would have taken so long for him to tell us.”

=== 2020-2025: Death of Tim Smith; third phase of activity and return to recording ===
On 22 July 2020, Jim Smith announced in a statement on Cardiacs' website that Tim had died the previous night. The news was confirmed by Torabi, Mary Wren from the Alphabet Business Concern, and another band representative. His exact cause of death was initially unconfirmed, but was deemed to be another heart attack. Tim Smith's funeral was held on 1 September 2020. The same day, the song "Vermin Mangle", originally planned as the final track on LSD—was released as a free download on the band's Bandcamp page. It was only played live a few times during Smith's solo performances in 2000 and 2006, with the studio version first shared publicly during Steve Davis' tribute show on Phoenix FM on 30 July. It was their first single and release of new material since "Ditzy Scene" in 2007, featuring the circus, prog and psychedelic instrumentation that drove the band's most classic work. Vermin Mangle features Tim Smith on vocals. The booklet for LSD states the song was dropped due to not fitting with the 'vibe' of other tracks and for not being meant as a final statement; "Pet Fezant" was instead used to end the album as it was meant as a true goodbye to Tim from all of his friends.

Following Tim's death, activity on the album continued. With all the lyrics done, and compositions near-finished, Jim would take responsibility of production decisions and album arrangement, working through 2021–2024 to complete it. A series of vocalists were assembled to finish the vocals for the album, with most lead vocals being filled by Mike Vennart and Rose Allen-Kemp. Vennart had been chosen, in part, for the level of "vocal agitation" he could provide to Tim's melodies. Fortnam continued his work that he had started with Tim and was in charge of all of the brass and string arrangements for the album.

== Promotion ==
Shortly after recording had finished, members of the band "past, present, and future" played sold-out shows as part of the tour Sing to Tim in 2024. In a tour interview, Jim Smith confirmed that LSD was in mixing phase and on BBC Radio 6 Music mentioned a tentative release date of April 2025. Smith elaborated that the album had been worked on before and during Tim Smith's illness and after his death, with contributions from many Cardiacs members and associates. Jon Poole explained that Jim Smith had been "the key element" in pushing the album toward completion.

On 26 July 2025, following a series of teaser images, The Alphabet Business Concern streamed a film of a previously unseen Cardiacs concert taking place at the Town and Country Club, London, 25 March 1988. At the end of the broadcast, a teaser for the first new Cardiacs single in 18 years, "Woodeneye" appeared, to be released 1 August 2025 as the first of three singles for LSD. An early broadcast of the song was played on BBC Radio 6 Music's programme Riley & Coe on 31 July 2025, before debuting on streaming services.

By August 2025, Cardiacs consisted of Jim Smith, Bob Leith, Kavus Torabi, Craig Fortnam, Sharron Fortnam, Mike Vennart, Chloe Herington and Jane Kaye (although Kaye was missing from the line-up by the time live concerts were played in March 2026). "Downup", the second single, was released on 28 August 2025. On 14 September 2025, Cardiacs held synchronized listening parties for LSD, where it was played in full. These were held in London, Brighton, Manchester and Liverpool, with different supporting acts. A video message from Jim Smith was screened before the playback, thanking fans for their support and firmly declaring Cardiacs were to continue as a musical act beyond LSD. The third LSD single, "Volob", was released on September 17, 2025.

LSD was released on 19 September 2025, which AllMusic biographer Paul Simpson noted, in an "amusing coincidence", was the same day as the long-planned second album by Cardi B.

== Cover art ==
The album's cover art, featuring a kangaroo, originated from a pub in Hungerford. Tim Smith bought the painting for £25 and originally planned to use it for the cover art of Guns until he learnt of the Hungerford massacre and thought that using a painting from the town would be in bad taste considering the album's name. It ended up on his wall at his home; while working on LSD in Tim's stead, the members of Cardiacs began staring at the painting until it became a mutual decision to use the painting as the album's front cover.

== Reception ==
Professional ratings
Aggregate scores
Source	Rating
Metacritic	90/100
Review scores
Source	Rating
Classic Rock	4.5/5 stars
Mojo	4/5 stars
MusicOMH	5/5 stars
OndaRock	7.5/10
Sputnikmusic	4.5/5
Uncut	9/10

Sean Kitching of The Quietus claimed it was "Bookended by the majestic but bittersweet hymn 'Men in Bed', which recalls Heaven Born and Ever Bright's 'Home Of Fadeless Splendour' and the elegiac and madrigal-like 'Pet Fezant', LSD offers a broad spectrum of delights." concluding, "LSD is a trip, a technicolour experience for the inner eye that only reveals the full richness of its sound and imagery with repeated listening." Joyzine was mixed on their assessment, expressing disappointment due to the absence of "Vermin Mangle" and felt some songs suffered from lacking Tim Smith's vocals, concluding, "this album is a multi tentacled beast, and I suppose it is a fitting tribute in that, although it isn’t perfect and some of it works and some of it doesn’t, it can’t be denied that everyone involved in it has done so with care and love."

In a 2025 buyer's guide to Cardiacs for an article covering LSD, the magazine Uncut called the album "a most fitting culmination to the Cardiacs story, full of songs that feel richer, more robust and more spirited than ever."

== Track listing ==
All music written by Tim Smith; all lyrics written by Smith, except where noted. Strings and brass written and arranged by Craig Fortnam.

No.	Title	Lyrics	Lead vocals	Length
1.	"Men in Bed"		Mike Vennart; Rose Kemp	3:39
2.	"The May"		Vennart	2:57
3.	"Gen"		T. Smith; Bob Leith	3:44
4.	"Woodeneye"		Vennart	3:19
5.	"Spelled All Wrong"		Vennart	5:10
6.	"By Numbers"		Vennart	4:19
7.	"The Blue and Buff"		Vennart	2:52
8.	"Skating"	T. Smith (Note: Only credited in The Story of LSD book); Joanne Spratley	Spratley; Kemp	7:44
9.	"Breed"		Vennart	3:12
10.	"Volob"	T. Smith; Suzy Kirby	Kemp	3:53
11.	"Busty Beez"	instrumental		8:59
12.	"Lovely Eyes"		Vennart	3:40
13.	"Ditzy Scene"	Kavus Torabi	T. Smith; Melanie Woods	6:40
14.	"Downup"	T. Smith; Jim Smith; Torabi	Vennart	4:31
15.	"A Roll from a Dirty Place"		Vennart	3:25
16.	"Made All Up"	Torabi (Note: Not credited in The Story of LSD)	T. Smith	5:14
17.	"Pet Fezant"	Emily Jones	Vennart; Kemp	6:53
Total length:				80:11

== Personnel ==
Credits are adapted from Bandcamp.

- Tim Smith – guitars (all tracks), keyboards (all tracks), vocals (2, 3, 5, 13, 16), bass (some tracks (Note: Jim Smith: "The bass is a mixture of myself and Tim. Tim plays bass in a certain style [...] so I left what Tim had done for those parts, but the stuff that's more in my ballpark, I redid.)), funny stuff (17)
- Jim Smith – basses (all tracks), vocals (1–9, 12, 17)
- Kavus Torabi – guitars (2–17), vocals (1–9, 12, 13, 15, 17), EBow guitars (14)
- Bob Leith – drums (1–16), percussion (1–16), vocals (1–9)
- Mike Vennart – vocals (1, 2, 4–10, 12, 14, 15, 17)
- Rose-Ellen Kemp – vocals (1, 4, 5, 7, 8, 10, 12, 15, 17)
- Craig Fortnam – vocals (1, 2, 7–9, 17), glockenspiel (7), spoken word (8)
- James Larcombe – piano (2, 5–8, 10, 12, 15, 16 (pianos)), keyboards (8, 10–12)
- Stephen Gilchrist – extra drums (8, 15)
- Sharron Fortnam – vocals (2, 5, 15, 17)
- Jane Kaye – vocals (8, 9, 17 (as Jane K))
- Jo Spratley – vocals (8)
- Suzanne Kirby – vocals (3, 13, 15, 16)
- Melanie Woods – vocals (13)
- Claire Lemmon – vocals (13)
- Rob Crow – drumfuckery

Special guest stars with voices

- Steve Morricone (2)
- Yael Claire Shahmoon (2)
- Emily Freya Jones (17)
- Nick Howiantz (4, 15, 17, keyboards on 8)
- Shane Embury (17)
- Duncan 'The Honest Man' Cooper (17)
- Jon 'The Choirboy' Daniel (17)
- Mick Pugh (17)

Strings

- Max Baillie – violin (1, 5, 11, 12, 17)
- Darius Luke Thompson – violin (1, 5, 11, 12, 17)
- Oli Langford – viola (1, 5, 11, 12, 17)
- Harry Escott – cello (1, 5, 7, 11, 12, 15, 17)

Brass

- Sam Barton – trumpet (1, 10, 11, 13, 14, 17)
- Pat White – flugal horn (1, 10, 11, 13, 14, 17)
- Ruth O'Reilly – French horn (1, 10, 11, 13, 14, 17)
- Tim Smart – tenor & bass trombone (1, 10, 11, 13, 14, 15, 17)
- Mickey McMillan – trombone (1, 10, 11, 13, 14, 17)

Technical

- Jim Smith – producer, executive producer
- Tim Smith – producer
- Kavus Torabi – producer
- Nick Howiantz – engineer
- Adam Noble – mixing engineer
- Frank Arkwight – mastering engineer

Visual

- Michael Chapman – art and design
- Dr. Norbert Lange – assistance

== Charts ==
Chart performance for LSD
Chart (2025)	Peak position
Scottish Albums (Official Charts)	81
UK Albums Sales (OCC)	22
UK Independent Albums (Official Charts)	7
