= Transmutations (album) =

Studio album by Yakuza
- Released: August 7, 2007
- Genre: Avant-garde metal; progressive metal
- Length: 60:20
- Label: Prosthetic Records
- Producer: Sanford Parker

Yakuza chronology
Samsara (2006)	Transmutations (2007)	Of Seismic Consequence (2010)

Professional ratings
Review scores
Source	Rating
AllMusic	4/5 stars
Pitchfork	6.9/10 stars
Metal Injection	9/10 stars

Transmutations is the fourth full-length studio album by Chicago-based progressive metal band Yakuza. It was released on August 7, 2007 by Prosthetic Records.

== Track listing ==
1. "Meat Curtains" - 6:50
2. "Egocide" - 7:41
3. "Congestive Art-Failure" - 3:38
4. "Praying For Asteroids" - 2:57
5. "Raus" - 6:48
6. "Steal The Fire" - 2:16
7. "The Blinding" - 6:10
8. "Existence Into Oblivion" - 4:46
9. "Perception Management" - 7:21
10. "Black Market Liver" - 5:05
11. "Zombies" - 6:54

== Personnel ==
- Bruce Lamont - saxophone, vocals
- James Staffel - drums
- Matt McClelland - guitar, vocals
- John E. Bomher - bass guitar

Additional

- Michael Zerang - percussion
- Hamid Drake - percussion
