= Yakuza (band) =

American rock band

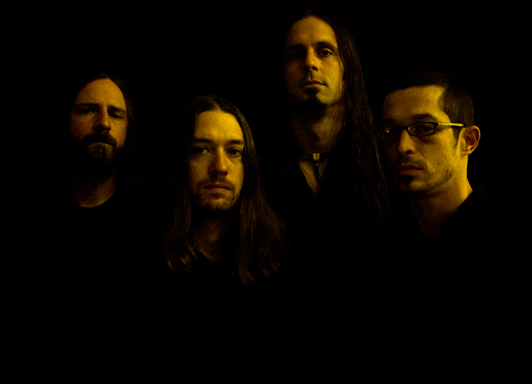

Background information
- Also known as: Chicago Yakuza
- Origin: Chicago, Illinois, U.S.
- Genres: Avant-garde metal; progressive metal; alternative metal; sludge metal; art metal; jazz metal
- Years active: 1999–present
- Labels: Century Media; Prosthetic; Profound Lore
- Members: Bruce Lamont; Matt McClelland; Jim Staffel; Ivan Cruz
- Past members: Eric Plonka; Eric Clark; John E. Bomher Jr.
- Website: yakuzachicago.com

Yakuza is an American rock band formed in Chicago in 1999. They have been acclaimed for their incorporation of jazz and world music elements.

== History ==
Yakuza was formed in 1999. The band debuted with its independently released album Amount to Nothing in 2000. The album was met with acclaim from Terrorizer and the Chicago Sun Times. Yakuza followed its release with a tour alongside Candiria and Burnt by the Sun, eventually leading to a slot on the Vans Warped Tour.

Such exposure led to a record contract and the release of their second album, Way of the Dead, through Century Media Records in 2002. Yakuza then shared the stage with Opeth, The Dillinger Escape Plan, Lacuna Coil and Mastodon. Jazz musician Ken Vandermark guests on the record (a unique live performance from 2002 is on YouTube). While the band received critical acclaim, the record failed to meet sales expectations; as a result, Way of the Dead was the only Century Media release. Eric Plonka parted ways in 2002 to start scientist. In 2005, the band signed with Prosthetic Records; in 2006, Samsara was released.

Samsara was recorded by Matt Bayles (Isis, Botch, Pearl Jam) at Volume Studios in Chicago. Yakuza enlisted a wide variety of musical guests on the album, including pianist Jim Baker, cellist Fred Lonberg-Holm, Sanford Parker, and Mastodon’s Troy Sanders.

Yakuza released Transmutations in 2007. This album incorporates more psychedelic elements alongside stretching, doomy movements and the jazz influences, while also incorporating breakneck grind riffs and grooves. The album features guest performances by world-renowned jazz percussionists Hamid Drake and Michael Zerang. This is unique for the fact that the two rarely play together, except during their annual "Winter Solstice Performances" in Chicago.

In 2010, the band released Of Seismic Consequence, their first album for Profound Lore Records.

In 2012 the band released Beyul, again for Profound Lore Records.

== Musical style and influences ==
The Prosthetic record label describes them this way:

Staying deeply rooted in a genre all its own, YAKUZA’s existence lies on a metal base with progressive flair, while somehow also incorporating elements of jazz, world beat, and post-rock ambience.

—

Influence is also noted from King Crimson, John Coltrane, Tortoise, and Napalm Death. Bruce Lamont has discussed an appreciation for Pink Floyd, Huun Huur Tu, Peter Brötzmann, Battles, Enslaved, Brighter Death Now, George Orwell, Ethiopian music, and Blut Aus Nord.

Their musical style has been described as avant-garde metal, progressive metal, alternative metal, experimental rock, jazz metal, art metal and post-metal.

== Band members ==
=== Current members ===
- Bruce Lamont – saxophone, clarinet, vocals, effects
- James Staffel – drums, percussion, keyboards
- Matt McClelland – guitars, vocals
- Jerome Marshall – bass, vocals

=== Former members ===
- Eric Plonka – guitars, vocals
- Eric Clark – bass, vocals
- John E. Bomher – bass
- Ivan Cruz – bass, vocals

== Discography ==
- Amount to Nothing (2001)
- Way of the Dead (2002), Century Media Records
- Samsara (2006), Prosthetic Records
- Transmutations (2007), Prosthetic Records
- Of Seismic Consequence (2010), Profound Lore Records
- Beyul (2012), Profound Lore Records
- Sutra (2023), Svart Records
