= Ditzy Scene =

2007 EP by Cardiacs

EP by Cardiacs

from the album LSD
- B-side: "Gen"; "Made All Up"
- Released: 5 November 2007 (Note: The release date of the EP is alternatively given as 1 September 2007 on Apple Music and Bandcamp.)
- Recorded: Autumn 2007
- Studio: Apollo 8 (Chessington)
- Length: 6:38
- Label: Org
- Composer: Tim Smith
- Lyricist: Kavus Torabi

Cardiacs chronology
"Signs" (1999)	"Ditzy Scene" (2007)	"Vermin Mangle" (2020)

Alternative cover

"Ditzy Scene" is a song by English rock band Cardiacs. It was released as a limited edition EP on Org Records in 2007, and was the band's last EP/single to be released in frontman Tim Smith's lifetime, as well as their most recent to be composed of entirely new material until 2025. The three tracks on the EP, transformed, feature on the band's sixth album, LSD (2025).

"Ditzy Scene" was included in Prog's list of Knifeworld frontman Kavus Torabi's Guide to Cardiacs. In 2018, the Alphabet Business Concern rereleased the song on Bandcamp.

== Writing and recording ==
"Ditzy Scene" was written by Tim Smith and Kavus Torabi. It was the first of several songs written following a Cardiacs' line-up change in 2004. Torabi wrote the lyrics after beginning to record their sixth album, provisionally titled LSD, in 2005. He said it was planned to be remixed for the album:

I'm not mad on the mix of it, so the plan would've been to remix it for the LSD album that never happened. I love the tune. It was the first thing that we did with that new line-up and it was a new thing.

The band recorded "Ditzy Scene" at Smith's own recording studio Apollo 8 in Autumn 2007, shortly before the last Cardiacs tour. Torabi wrote the lyrics to Smith's arrangement, as well as playing the guitar solo for the intro. The intro, according to Torabi, was extremely hard to play, requiring complete concentration from the band. They recorded the song with tapes. Along with Smith, vocals were provided by Torabi, bass player Jim Smith, Claire Lemmon and "special guest star" Suzanne Kirby.

"Ditzy Scene"
Sample of "Ditzy Scene" (EP version). The sample illustrates the change in dynamics from intro to chorus.

In an interview with Prog, Torabi described his first reaction to the song's structure whilst recording: "When we started recording it was like 'Fucking hell ... here we go!' When those girl vocals came in at the start, going 'Aaah aaah!' it was a real goosebump moment and I thought 'Okay, we've really got something here ...' It's just brilliant."

The entire EP's contents ("Ditzy Scene", "Gen", and "Made All Up") was re-recorded for the band's final album, LSD (2025), using Tim's original recorded vocal takes, as he had been rendered immobile and unable to speak as a result of his dystonia episode in 2008 and died in 2020.

== Release and reception ==
The "Ditzy Scene" EP, backed with two other tracks "Gen" and "Made All Up", was due for release just prior to the start of Cardiacs' first full UK tour since 2000. On November 5, it had a limited edition press release on Org Records, with only 1000 copies made. Cardiacs planned to release their first studio album since Guns (1999) early the following year. The song charted at number 72 on the Spanish iTunes Chart on 11 October 2020.

== Formats and track listings ==
All lyrics are written by Cardiacs (noted); all music is composed by Tim Smith.

CD EP

1. "Ditzy Scene" (Kavus Torabi) – 6:38
2. "Gen" (Smith) – 3:42
3. "Made All Up" (Torabi) – 5:04

CDr promo

1. "Ditzy Scene" – 6:38

== Personnel ==
Original EP

Credits are adapted from the liner notes of "Ditzy Scene".

- Tim Smith – guitar, loud voice
- Cathy Harabaras – tube bell, big drum, percussions
- Jim Smith – bass guitar, voice
- Kavus Torabi – guitar, voice
- Melanie Woods – voice
- Bob Leith – many drums and some cymbals
- Dawn Staple – tube bell, big drum, percussions
- Claire Lemmon – voice

with:

- Suzanne Kirby – voice

LSD credits for "Ditzy Scene" only

Credits from Bandcamp.

- Tim Smith – guitar, keyboards, vocals, music
- Kavus Torabi – guitar, vocals, lyrics
- Bob Leith – drums, percussion
- Jim Smith – bass guitar
- Suzanne Kirby – vocals
- Melanie Woods – vocals
- Claire Lemmon – vocals
- Craig Fortnam - brass arrangement
- Sam Barton - trumpet
- Pat White - flugal horn
- Ruth O'Reilly - french horn
- Tim Smart - tenor & bass trombone
- Mickey McMillan - trombone
