= Rose Kemp =

English singer and guitarist

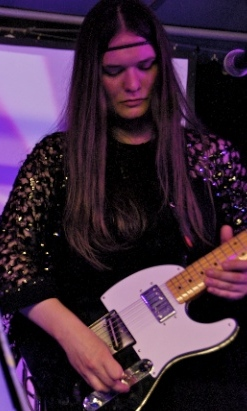
- Kemp performing at Supersonic Festival 2009

Background information
- Born: Rose-Ellen Kemp; December 11, 1984 (age 41); Carlisle, Cumbria, England
- Genres: Rock; hard rock; pop; pop rock; folk rock; doom metal; drone metal; heavy metal
- Occupations: Musician; singer
- Instruments: Vocals; bass; guitars; drums; keyboards
- Website: rosekemp.info/index.htm

Rose-Ellen Kemp (born 11 December 1984) is an English singer and guitarist who performs in a variety of musical genres. She is the daughter of Maddy Prior and Rick Kemp of the folk-rock band Steeleye Span.

== Singing career ==
Kemp began her singing career performing live with Steeleye Span while still in her teenage years. This led to her being invited to contribute vocals to several albums by various folk artists. In 1996 she sang with The Carnival Band on their Carols at Christmas CD. In 2002 Park Records released the a cappella folk album Bib and Tuck by 'Maddy Prior And The Girls', a trio composed of Maddy Prior, Rose Kemp and Abbie Lathe. Kemp wrote, and sang lead vocals on, several of the album's tracks.

Kemp's first solo album Glance, an acoustic pop record, was released on Park Records in 2003. She subsequently toured with The Oyster Band as part of The Big Session, appearing with them across the UK and Europe.

2004 saw a considerable change in the direction of Rose's musical output. She recorded a mini-album, originally entitled The Free To Be Me EP, but later renamed simply Mini-Album, at Warehouse Studios in Oxford with members of The Fourers.

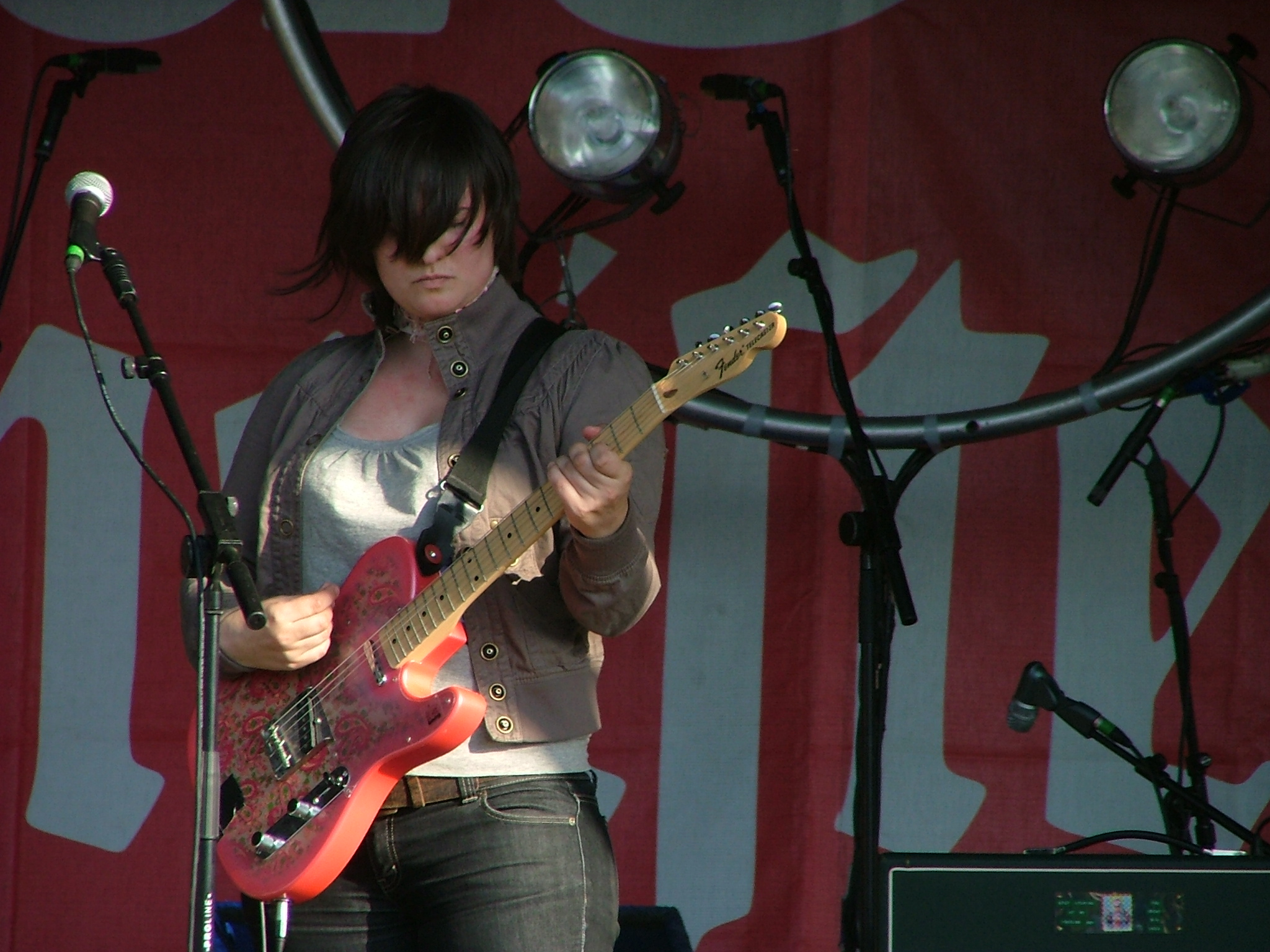
Kemp in 2005

Kemp signed an album deal with One Little Indian Records in July 2005, and recorded her second full-length album, A Hand Full of Hurricanes, at studios in Bristol and Cardiff with producer Charlie Francis. This album was released in February 2007. After a large amount of time spent touring the UK and Europe in support of the record, including the BBC Introducing stage at the Glastonbury Festival, she began recording in summer 2007 at State of Art studios, Bristol. Her third studio album, Unholy Majesty was produced by Chris Sheldon and was released on 1 September 2007. The following two years saw Rose making appearances at the acclaimed Roadburn Festival (Tilburg, Netherlands) and Supersonic Festival (Birmingham, UK), as well as a headline tour and appearances supporting Porcupine Tree. She released a fourth album, Golden Shroud, in 2010, and promoted it on a tour with Mono and Grails.

In December 2010 a Rose Kemp cover version of the song "Wind and Rains is Cold" appeared on Leader Of The Starry Skies: A Tribute To Tim Smith, Songbook 1, a fundraising compilation album to benefit the hospitalised Cardiacs leader Tim Smith.

In 2024, she re-released Unholy Majesty. In 2025, she was credited vocals on Cardiacs album, LSD.

== Other projects ==
=== Jeremy Smoking Jacket ===
From 2006 to 2008 Kemp performed with SJ Esau as part of the experimental trio Jeremy Smoking Jacket. The band released an album in 2006 and performed at Glastonbury Festival 2007.

=== ANTA ===
In 2009 Kemp became a founding member of psychedelic band ANTA.

=== Workshops ===
Kemp, with Maddy Prior, facilitates music workshops in Cumbria.

== Discography ==
Name	ID	Credits	Notes
Carols at Christmas	Album/1996/Park Records PRKCD45	as 'Rosie Kemp' singing with The Carnival Band	
Bib and Tuck	Album/2002/Park Records	as 'Maddy Prior And The Girls' with Maddy Prior and Abbie Lathe	
Glance	Album/2003/Park Records)	as 'Rose Kemp'	
Mini-Album	EP/2004/Self Release	as 'Rose Kemp'	
Now We Are Dead (and Other Stories)	EP/2005/Enormous Corpse-Fact Fans	as 'Jeremy Smoking Jacket' with SJ Esau and Max Milton	
Violence	7"vinyl single/2006/One Little Indian Records	as 'Rose Kemp'	
A Hand Full of Hurricanes	Album/2007/One Little Indian Records	as 'Rose Kemp'	
Ammonia	track on Idolum by Ufomammut (Supernatural Cat Records)	Ufomammut feat. Rose Kemp	
Heavy Black Snow	Brew Records BRW013	collaboration track with Humanfly	
Unholy Majesty	Album/2008/One Little Indian Records; VINYL LP/Aurora Borealis Records	as 'Rose Kemp'	
Golden Shroud	Album/2010	as 'Rose Kemp'	
