= Jim Smith (bassist) =

English musician

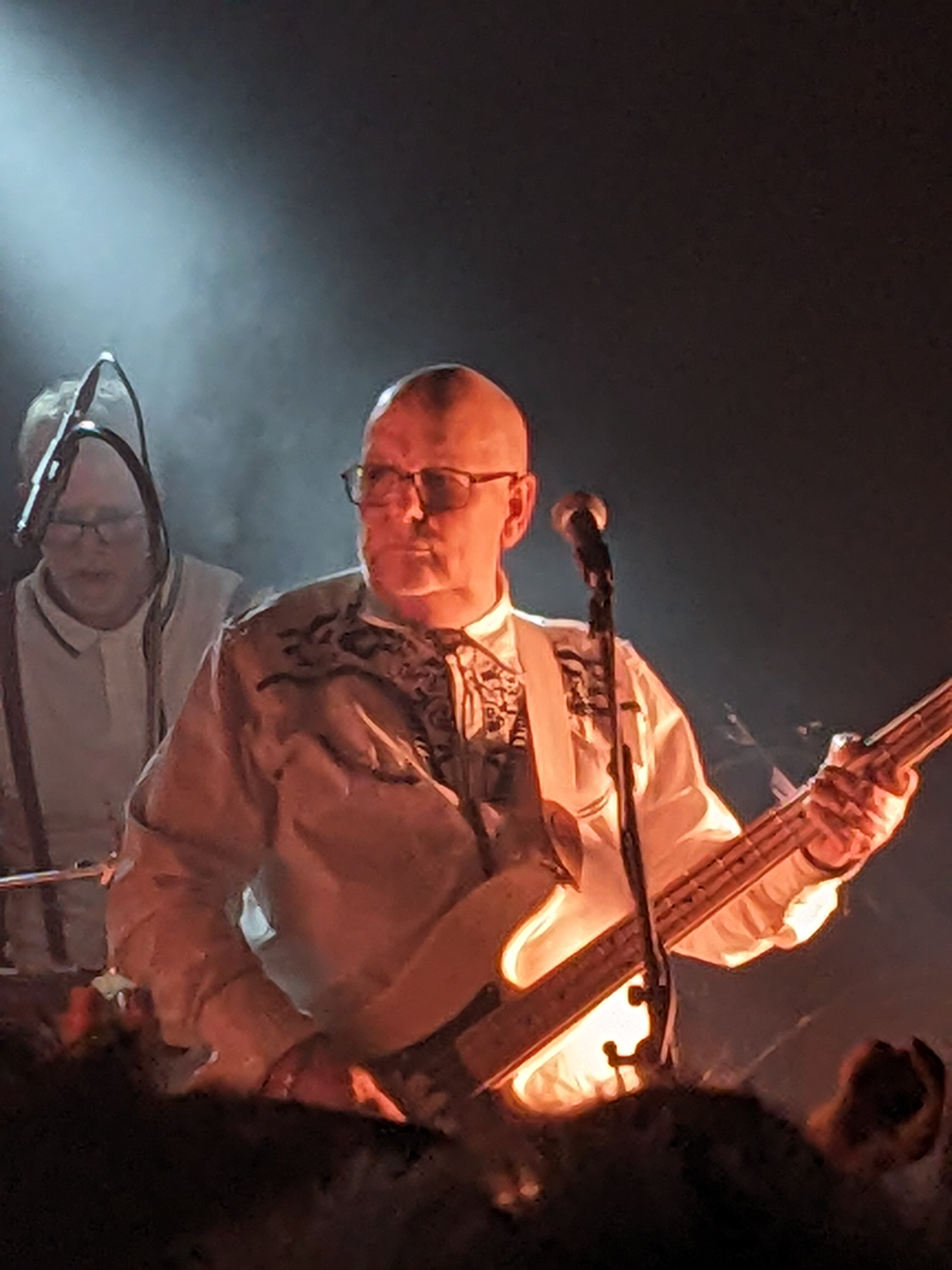
- Smith in 2024

Background information
- Born: James A. Smith; 14 April 1958 (age 68); Carshalton, Surrey, England
- Genre: Rock
- Occupation: Musician
- Instruments: Bass guitar; vocals
- Years active: 1977–present
- Member of: Cardiacs
- Relatives: Tim Smith (brother)

James A. Smith (born 14 April 1958) is an English musician, best known as the bassist for the rock band Cardiacs which he formed with his brother Tim Smith, the band's frontman and leader. Jim is highly regarded for his distinctive bass playing.

Smith grew up in Chessington, Surrey, purchasing a bass in 1972. He co-founded the band that would become Cardiacs, Cardiac Arrest, in 1977 on bass and backing vocals, though he allegedly couldn't play an instrument. Smith played on every Cardiacs release and, along with Tim, was the only constant member in the band's regularly changing lineup. He became popular and was often bullied by his brother on stage during Cardiacs performances, with the band purportedly formed to punish him for the unkind things he would do to Tim as an infant. Jim Smith also penned the majority of Cardiacs "Yousletters", direct communications with fans, until Cardiacs were forced to retire in 2008 due to Tim Smith's illness.

Following Tim's death in 2020, Jim wrote a funeral notice and released the song "Vermin Mangle" with Cardiacs before performing a new version of the song "Tarred and Feathered" with members of Napalm Death, Voivod and Municipal Waste in 2021. Jim has since taken on a central role in Cardiacs; in 2024, Cardiacs including Jim returned with a tour of Sing to Tim live shows, and he worked on completing the previously unfinished album LSD for a release in 2025.

== Life and career ==
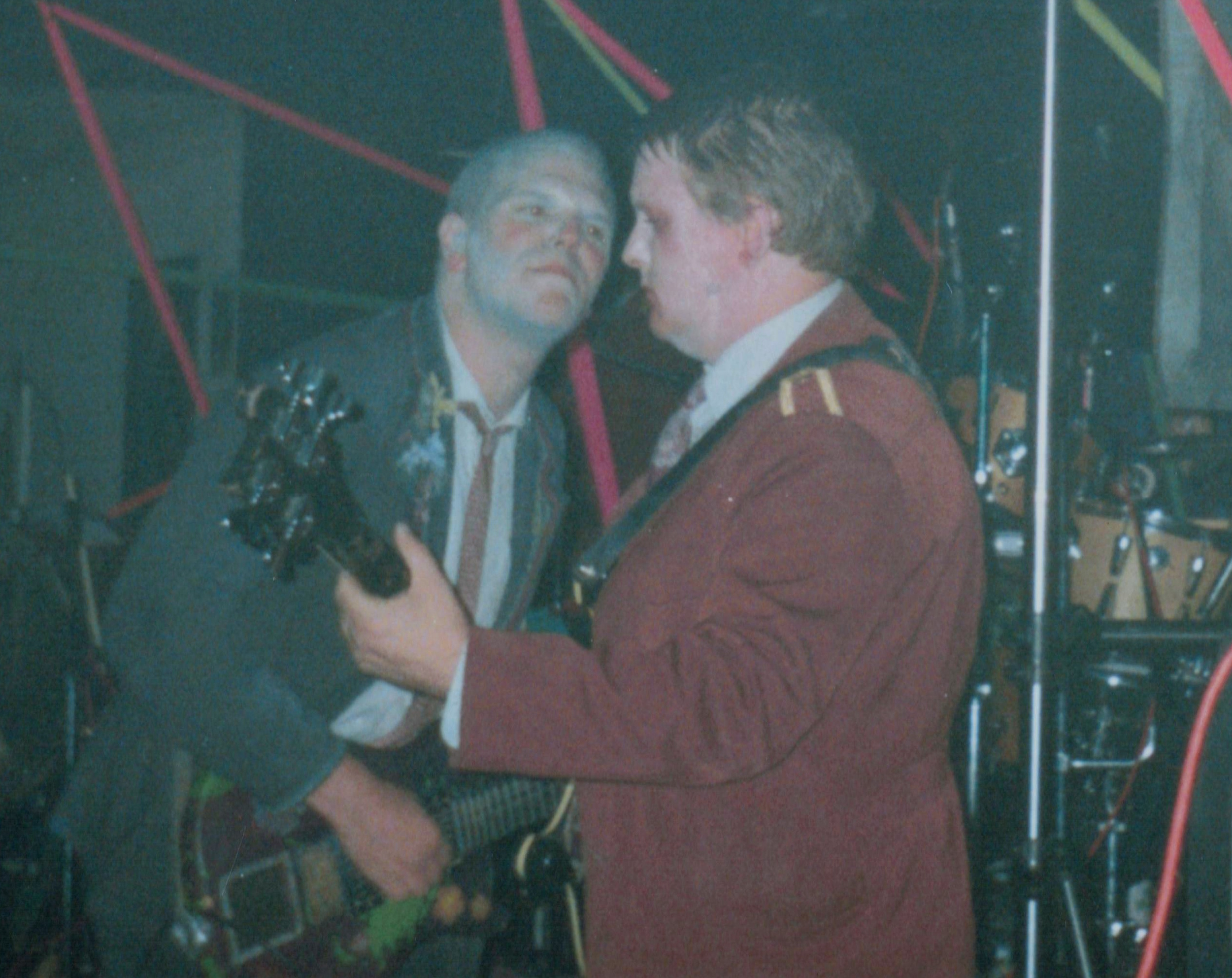
Tim (left) and Jim Smith in 1987

James A. "Jim" Smith was born in Carshalton, Surrey on 14 April 1958. He grew up in a Chessington house with his mother Eileen and his younger brother Tim who was born three years later. Eileen was a dinner lady at the primary school Jim attended with Tim. Their father Ernie, a jazz trumpeter in a swing dance band, died suddenly when Jim was six. Jim purchased an electric bass to play a blues riff in around 1972 and played with Tim on snare drum according to the official Cardiacs history. They attended Fleetwood Secondary School in Chessington, Surrey, with future Cardiacs members Colvin Mayers, Mark Cawthra and Peter Tagg. Tim briefly played bass in his first guitar experiments, before the task was passed to Jim.

Smith realised that music could become his life from the momentum of do it yourself punk. He co-founded the band that would become Cardiacs, Cardiac Arrest, with Tim in 1977, along with Michael Pugh on vocals and Peter Tagg on drums. The Smith brothers were the only constant members in the band's regularly changing lineup. Jim played bass and backing vocals, though he allegedly couldn't play an instrument. Tim—the leader of the band—originally took on guitar and backing vocal duties before a personnel change saw him promoted to frontman. According to Cardiacs' official history, happily unreliable folklore, Tim intended to make Jim "look as foolish as possible on stage" to punish him "for all the unkind things he would do to him as an infant". The idea was to play unpalatable, unpopular music and therefore humiliate Jim, forming the band as revenge. On Cardiac Arrest's first album, the cassette-only release The Obvious Identity (1980), Jim was credited as "Patty Pilf". On the second Cardiacs cassette, Toy World (1981), Jim co-wrote the album's lyrics with Tim and Cawthra.

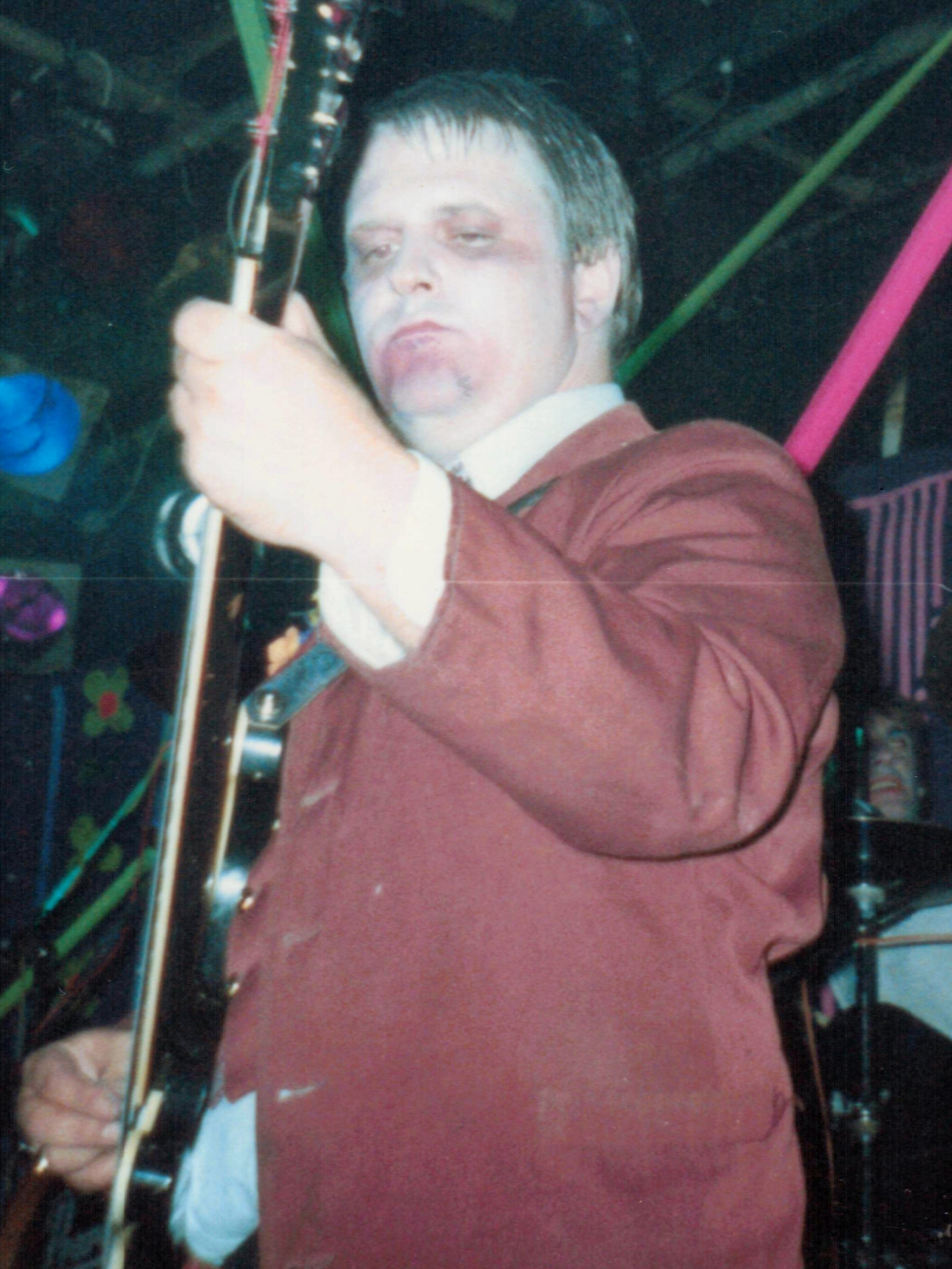
Smith in Amsterdam, 1987

The six-piece "classic" lineup of Tim and Jim Smith with Tim's then-wife Sarah Smith (saxophone and woodwind), William D. Drake (keyboards) Tim Quy (percussion, marimba and synthesiser) and Dominic Luckman (drums) recorded the first official full-length Cardiacs album A Little Man and a House and the Whole World Window (1988) sporadically between 1985 and 1987.

On Cardiacs' 1992 album Heaven Born and Ever Bright, Smith co-wrote the opening track "The Alphabet Business Concern (Home of Fadeless Splendour)" with Tim as an overwrought choral tribute to the band's own record label. The hymn was often used to open shows. In their shows, a taciturn Jim would recurringly be bullied by his brother, berated for smiling at the audience, and hit violently around the head. Tim would goad him over his weight, announcing during gigs that it would be their last because Jim was "too fat" and "going to die". Jim would reportedly get revenge by hiding Tim's hi-fi and TV in the local pond wrapped in bin bags. Jim became popular, with crowds chanting his name during concerts. His girlfriend Jane ran the band's merch stall.

In the spring of 1995, Tim Smith moved the recording equipment he had accumulated to Jim's place in the countryside for the production of Sing to God (1996).

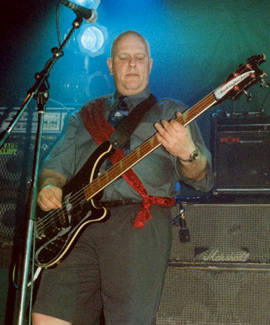
Smith at The Garage, London in 1999

In October 2003, Cardiacs played three consecutive concerts at The Garage in London where they performed more than 33 songs from their early years from 1977 to 1983. Perfect Sound Forever's Martijn Voorvelt mentioned that Tim and Jim must have been "in their fifties by now, looking like bank managers rather than rock stars" but that "their live shows still emit an extraordinary energy". The Cardiacs DVD Some Fairytales from the Rotten Shed, released in 2017, comprises Cardiacs' rehearsal footage filmed just prior to the 2003 concerts. Having first been made to wait outside in the rain, Jim spends the entire session in his underpants, trying to avoid being crushed by a cymbal. In one scene, a stoically deadpan Jim tries to put his lead back into his guitar with fuzzy crackles.

Smith also played in the Cardiacs associated project Katherine in a Cupboard (alternatively spelt "Catherine") with Cardiacs drummer Bob Leith.

Smith penned the majority of Cardiacs "Yousletters", direct communications with fans in the days of photocopied zines before the onset of the internet, until Cardiacs were forced to retire in 2008 due to Tim Smith's collapse in June a day after their final radio session with Marc Riley, and further illness. Jim was subsequently "more busy looking after Tim and going to see him" than anything else, and shifted the band out of his life.

Tim Smith was awarded an Honorary Degree as Doctor of Music from the Royal Conservatoire of Scotland in 2018, which Jim received in his stead, confessing to the head Registrar that he "felt like a fraud, and it was all probably a mistake." Jim announced Tim's death in July 2020 on the Cardiacs website, saying "my dearest brother Tim passed away suddenly last night. Sorry it’s a brief message but I don’t have it in me to speak at length just now". He wrote a funeral notice for Tim, releasing the song "Vermin Mangle" with Cardiacs the same day.

A one-off supergroup comprising members of Napalm Death, Voivod, Municipal Waste, Child Bite and Yakuza joined forces with Jim Smith to record a new version of the Cardiacs song "Tarred and Feathered" from Big Ship (1987) in remembrance of Tim, released in 2021. After bassist Shane Embury of Napalm Death got involved, Shane insisted that Jim Smith be there to oversee his contribution and asked him to play bass too. According to an interview about the cover in Decibel, the pair met up at Headline Music Studios in Cambridge, wherein Embury got to play Smith's bass and wear his old school Cardiacs tie. Smith, who looked sad, bored and unsmiling with Cardiacs, smiled in the video.

Since Tim Smith’s death, Jim Smith has taken on a central role in Cardiacs. He was left with the Alphabet Business Concern imprint, with a team dealing with PayPal and artwork. Tim Smith's last task before his death was the 2020 remaster of A Little Man and a House and the Whole World Window, which warms up Jim's bass parts. In the book that accompanies the four-disc reissue, Jim said "It is probably my favourite album that we did." In 2023, Jim announced the death of Tim Quy on the Cardiacs website.

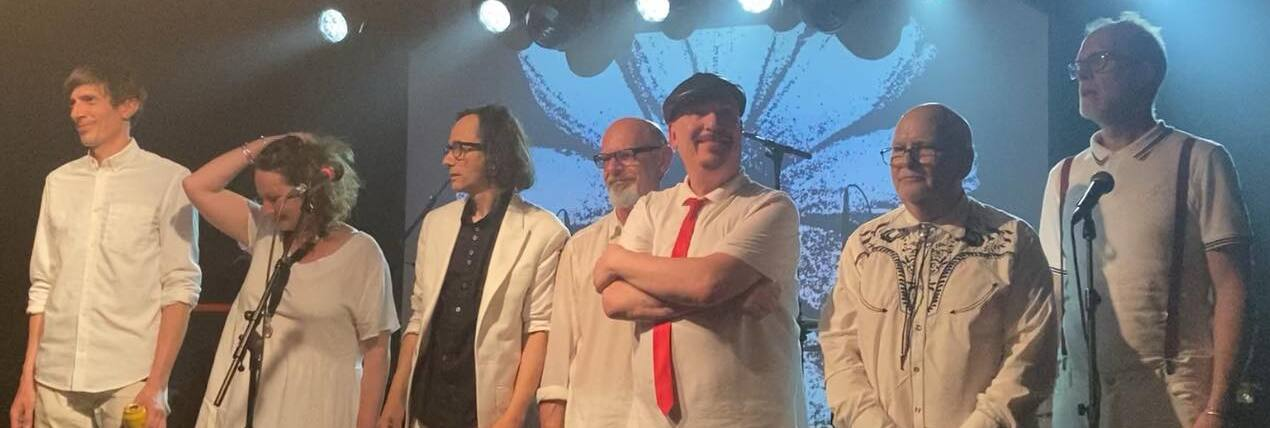
Smith (second from right) with Cardiacs Family & Friends in 2024

In 2024, four years after Tim Smith's death, Cardiacs returned as a live act. The lineup of the 2024 Sing to Tim live shows included Jim as part of Cardiacs Family, or Cardiacs & Friends. Jim "never even considered playing while Tim was ill", but after his death Jim thought the time was ready when Christian "Bic" Hayes and Jo Spratley came up with the idea. Jim was involved in the production of the book Cardiacs: A Big Book and a Band and the Whole World Window as the band curator, providing his perspective along with other former members Sarah Jones, Kavus Torabi and Mark Cawthra, as well as Matthew Cutts; the 300-page coffee table book was assembled with Jim Smith's blessing. Smith told The Quietus that the book came about prior to the pandemic after Rob Crow of Pinback began working on a film about Cardiacs, with Rob coming over with Aaron Tanner of Melodic Virtue when they scanned the band's photographs.

Smith has also worked on completing the previously unfinished Cardiacs album LSD for a posthumous release in 2025. He mentioned that he hoped to have surviving members of Cardiacs tour behind the album as well, but was "not scheduling anything as yet until as and when [he] can speak to everyone." A revived band finally toured in 2025.

== Musical style and equipment ==
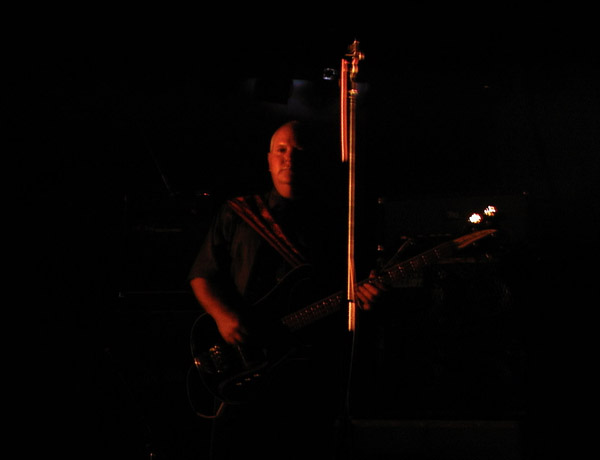
Smith at Whitchurch Festival in 2000

In 2004, Voorvelt called Jim "the silent, stubby bass player who is ritually ridiculed by both Tim and the fans during live shows". Smith's electric bass contributions have been called "effortlessly brilliant", and he is highly regarded for his distinctive bass playing. He played a Rickenbacker bass.

== Discography ==
Writing credits:

- "A Cake for Bertie's Party" from "A Bus for a Bus on the Bus" (co-written with Tim Smith and Colvin Mayers)
- "Leaf Scrapings" from The Obvious Identity (written by Tim Smith and Cardiac Arrest)
- All lyrics on Toy World (with Tim Smith and Mark Cawthra)
- "The Alphabet Business Concern (Home of Fadeless Splendour)" from Heaven Born and Ever Bright (co-written with Tim Smith)

Other appearances:

- Cardiacs Family & Friends Obligatory Choir Duties on "Jade" and "Gold Place" from Bloom by Spratleys
