= Tim Smith discography =

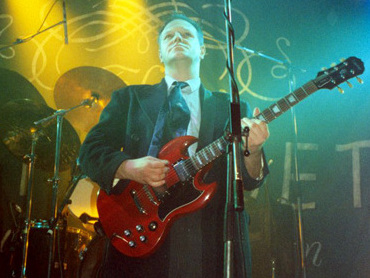
Smith with Cardiacs in 1999

As a lead artist, the discography of English musician, singer, songwriter, record producer and video director Tim Smith comprises one studio album and three appearances on other albums. The music Smith created pushed the standard structures of rock music, while various points in his discography emphasise the pop and chamber music side of his songwriting. He has produced records for his own bands Cardiacs, the Sea Nymphs and Spratleys Japs, as well as for Levitation, Eat, Flinch, Sidi Bou Said, Lake of Puppies, Adrian Borland, Shrubbies, Gertrude, the Monsoon Bassoon, William D. Drake, Oceansize, Stars in Battledress, the Scaramanga Six, Silver Ginger 5/Ginger, and the Trudy. As a session musician, Smith contributed backing vocals, drums and percussion (including body percussion), keyboards, guitar, bass guitar and sound effects, as well as brass and string arrangements. He has directed or edited video releases for Cardiacs, Sepultura, Dark Star and the Wildhearts.

== Studio albums ==
List of studio albums, with release date, label and format
Title	Details	Ref
Tim Smith's Extra Special OceanLandWorld	Released: 1995; Label: Alphabet Business Concern; Format: CD	

== Appearances ==
List of albums on which Tim Smith has appeared as a lead artist
Title	Year	Artist	Track	Note
Sampler	1995	Cardiacs	"Veronica in Ecstacy"	
If You Break It, It's Yours!	1997	Katherine in a Cupboard	"Shiny Things"	Credited as T. Smith
Cardiacs and Affectionate Friends	2001	Cardiacs and various artists	"Swimming with the Snake"	Credited to Oceanland World or OceanLandWorld

== Credits ==
Key
†	Indicates artist including Tim Smith as a member and songwriter

List of credits on released recordings
Title	Artist(s)	Year	Producer	Mixer	Recording engineer	Instruments	Other	Ref
Cardiac Arrest E.P.	Cardiac Arrest †	1979				Guitar, vocals/synth		
The Obvious Identity	Cardiac Arrest †	1980	Cardiac Arrest		Simon (some); Peter (most)	Voice, guitar, synthesiser, organ, claps, glockenspiel		
Toy World	Cardiacs †	1981	Cardiacs	Cardiacs	Mark Cawthra; Peter Kunzler	Guitar, keyboards, voice		
The Seaside	Cardiacs †	1984	Tim Smith; Graham Simmonds			Guitar, voice	Arrangement	
Shock of Daylight	The Sound	1984	Pat Collier		Alan Douglas	Brass	Brass arrangement	
Seaside Treats	Cardiacs †	1984	Tim Smith; Graham Simmonds (Note: EP only)			Guitar, voice	Director	
Mr and Mrs Smith and Mr Drake	Mr & Mrs Smith & Mr Drake †	1984				Guitars, flute, trumpets, glockensput, Woolworths organ, vocals		
"Captain Scarlet" / "Lunar Love Affair"	The Trudy	1986	Graham Simmonds	Yes	Helene Fairfax			
Rude Bootleg	Cardiacs †	1986				Guitar, vocals		
Big Ship	Cardiacs †	1987	Tim Smith; Graham Simmonds	Tim Smith; Graham Simmonds	Nigel Gilroy; Roger Tebbutt	Electric guitar, main voice		
"There's Too Many Irons in the Fire"	Cardiacs †	1987	Yes			Lead voice, guitar		
Radio 1 Sessions / The Evening Show	Cardiacs †	1988	Harry Parker		Simon Clifford	Guitar, lead vocals		
A Little Man and a House and the Whole World Window	Cardiacs †	1988	Yes		Pete Hammond; Stuart Barry; Spencer Henderson; Graham Simmonds; Roger Tebbutt	Lead voice, guitar, flutes, recorders		
"Is This the Life"	Cardiacs †	1988	Yes		Pete Hammond; Stuart Barry; Spencer Henderson; Graham Simmonds	Lead voice, guitar		
"Susannah's Still Alive"	Cardiacs †	1988	Yes		Roger Tebbutt	Guitar, vocals		
Cardiacs Live	Cardiacs †	1988				Lead vocals, guitar		
Archive Cardiacs	Cardiacs †	1989	The Consultant; Miss Swift			Guitar, drums, vocals. flutes, keyboards, percussion	Arrangement	
"Baby Heart Dirt"	Cardiacs †	1989	Yes					
On Land and in the Sea	Cardiacs †	1989	Yes		Roger Tebbutt; Graham Simmonds	Guitar, lead vocals		
Songs for Ships and Irons	Cardiacs †	1991	Yes			Guitar, vocals		
"Day Is Gone"	Cardiacs †	1991	Yes		David Murder	Guitar, voice		
"Appealing to Venus"	The Sea Nymphs †	1991						
All That Glitters Is a Mares Nest	Cardiacs †	1992				Lead vocals, guitar		
"Cutwater"	Levitation	1992	Mike Dignam; Tim Smith					
The Sea Nymphs	The Sea Nymphs †	1992	The Sea Nymphs			Vocals, keyboards, guitars, percussion		
"Shame"	Eat	1992	Tim Smith (Note: "Shame" and "Out of Line"); Eat (Note: "Knock Me Down" and "On the Road Again")		Jeremy Wheatley (Note: "Shame" and "Knock Me Down"); Finn Steele (Note: "On the Road Again" and "Out of Line")			
Under Siege (Live in Barcelona)	Sepultura	1992	Steven Malitsky	Harris Johns	Harris Johns		Editing	
"World Around"	Levitation	1992	Tim Smith; Mike Dignam		Steve Elswood			
Heaven Born and Ever Bright	Cardiacs †	1992	Yes	David Murder; Tim Smith	David Murder	Vocals, guitar, keyboards		
Need for Not	Levitation	1992	Tim Smith; Mike Dignam					
The Golden Egg EP	Eat	1992	Chris Kimsey (Note: "Golden Egg" (edit) and "Belly Town"); Tim Smith (Note: "Streets are Full" and "Double Bubble")	Tim Smith (Note: Remixed "Golden Egg" (edit) and "Belly Town")	Jeremy Wheatley			
"Bleed Me White"	Eat	1993	Eat (Note: "Bleed Me White"); Mark Saunders (Note: "Bleed Me White" and "Haddlyanndan"); Tim Smith (Note: "Ice Pond")	Tim Smith	Mark Saunders; Finn Steele			
"Even When Your Eyes Are Open"	Levitation	1993	Tim Smith; Mike Dignam	Mike 'Spike' Drake (Note: "Even When Your Eyes Are Open" and "Evergreen"); Levitation (Note: "Mantra")	Mike Dignam (Note: "Even When Your Eyes Are Open"); Tim Smith; Huw David Price (Note: "Evergreen" and "Mantra")			
"King of Mice"	Levitation	1994	Tim Smith (Note: "King of Mice" and "Imagine the Sharks"); Mike Dignam; Levitation (Note: "The Heart of the Home")	Mike 'Spike' Drake; Levitation	Mike Dignam		Brass and string arrangements on "King of Mice"	
"Chain By Day"	Levitation	1994	Andy Gill (Note: "Chain By Day"); Tim Smith (Note: "Faultless"); Mike Dignam	Alan Moulder; Mike 'Spike' Drake; Levitation (Note: "Holy Island")	Mike Dignam (Note: "Chain By Day" and "Faultless")			
Meanwhile Gardens	Levitation	1994	Tim Smith; Mike Dignam; Andy Gill; Levitation (Note: "All at Sea" and "Under Stone")	Mike 'Spike' Drake; Alan Moulder; Levitation			Brass and string arrangements on "King of Mice"	
"Shock Giro"	Pinhead Nation	1995	Christian Hayes	Yes	Dave Mercer			
"Skin Deep"	Flinch	1995	Teo Miller (Note: "Skin Deep"); Tim Smith (Note: "Spoonz")					
"Wormee"	Sidi Bou Said	1995	Tim Smith (Note: "Wormee" and "Slitty Gap")	Gayl Harrison (Note: "Throwing Myself off a Building")	Dave Mercer; Gayl Harrison			
"Bellyeye"	Cardiacs †	1995	Yes			Guitar, keyboards, vocals		
Bodies	Sidi Bou Said	1995	Yes	Yes	Dave Mercer	Mandolin, guest vocals		
"Ode to Drink"	Sidi Bou Said	1995	Yes		Dave Mercer			
"Funnybody"	Sidi Bou Said	1996	Jon Poole (Note: "Funnybody"); Sidi Bou Said; Tim Smith (Note: "Red Bus Rover")	Roger Tebbutt; Jon Poole	Roger Tebbutt; Murder			
Sing to God	Cardiacs †	1996	Yes			Guitar, keyboards, vocals, television organ	Riffs and arrangements, String Quartet arrangements	
"Manhoo"	Cardiacs †	1996	Yes			Guitar, keyboard, vocals		
"Odd Even"	Cardiacs †	1996	Yes			Guitar, keyboard, vocals		
5:00 AM	Adrian Borland	1997	Adrian Borland; Tim Smith		Yes	Drum, keyboard & sample programming, backing vocals, harmonium on "I'm Your Freedom"		
The Shrubbies	Shrubbies	1997	Yes			Hand claps on "Perfect Present"		
Dirty Windows	Gertrude	1998	Yes		Yes		Ideas and inspiration	
Memphis in Texas	Shrubbies	1999	Yes			Hand claps on "Perfect Present"		
Pony	Spratleys Japs †	1999	Yes			Voice, bass, piano, organ		
I Dig Your Voodoo	The Monsoon Bassoon	1999	Yes		Tim Smith; David Murder (drums)			
Guns	Cardiacs †	1999	Yes			Guitar, keyboards, lead vocals	Riffs and arrangements	
"Signs"	Cardiacs †	1999				Loudest voice, guitar, keyboards	Riffs and arrangements	
Cardiacs and Affectionate Friends	Cardiacs † and various artists	2001				Performer	Compiler	
William D. Drake	William D. Drake	2001	Yes			Voicebox, electrix guitar solo, snare drum, bass guitar box		
Relapse EP	Oceansize	2002	Yes	Eliot James; Sel Balamir; Oceansize	Eliot James			
Greatest Hits	Cardiacs †	2002	Yes			Guitar, keyboards, vocals		
Secrets and Signals	Stars in Battledress	2003	Yes		Yes			
Cabin Fever	The Scaramanga Six	2004	Yes		Yes			
Black Leather Mojo	Silver Ginger 5	2005	Yes					
The Special Garage Concerts	Cardiacs †	2005			Mike Quayle	Guitar, main vocals		
"Baggage"	The Scaramanga Six	2006			Yes			
Sympathetic Storm	Two Worlds Collide	2006		Mr Murder ("Insomnia")		Keyboards and backing vocals on "We're All Gonna Die"		
In the Heart of the Home	Mikrokosmos	2007	Mikrokosmos	Tim Smith; Mikrokosmos	Mikrokosmos			
Yoni	Ginger	2007	Tim Smith; Jason Edwards					
The Dance of Death	The Scaramanga Six	2007	Yes		Yes	Timpani and bells on "The Towering Inferno"		
"Ditzy Scene"	Cardiacs †	2007				Guitar, loud voice		
"3 Minutes 4U"	The Trudy	2007	The Trudy (Note: "3 Minutes 4U" and "Lost Summer of Love"); Tim Smith (Note: "Lost Summer of Love")	Tim Smith (Note: "3 Minutes 4U)	Tim Smith			
Market Harbour	Ginger	2008	LEGION	LEGION		Guitar, bass, sound effects, steel drums, backing vocals	String arrangements	
"Walking Through Houses"	The Scaramanga Six	2008			Yes			
Live in the Studio: A Film by Tim Smith	The Wildhearts	2008			Neil Darbyshire (Note: live concert sound); Jase Edwards (Note: live studio sound); Tim Smith		Director	
Birds	North Sea Radio Orchestra	2008	Mark Cawthra; Tim Smith (Note: extra bits and bobs)		Marco Migliari; Bob Reich; Darryl Anthony			
Luck Had Nothing to Do with it	Pinhead Nation	2012	Bic Hayes	Tim Smith; Bic Hayes	Dave Murder (Note: initial recording); Tim Smith (Note: final recording)	Backing vocals, handclaps	Editor	
Meanwhile Gardens	Levitation	2015	Tim Smith; Mike Dignam	Mike 'Spike' Drake	Mike Dignam; Damien Corner; Paul Tipler		Brass and string arrangements	
On the Dry Land	The Sea Nymphs †	2016				Vocals, keyboards, guitars		
Some Fairytales From the Rotten Shed	Cardiacs †	2017	Yes			Guitar, lead vocals	Editor	
"Her" / "Hands"	Spratleys Japs	2018		Christian Hayes	Cameron Devlin; Adrien Rodes; Christian Hayes		Executive musical director	
Gap Species	North Sea Radio Orchestra	2019		Tim Smith; Craig Fortnam	Craig Fortnam; Tim Smith (vocals)	Choir on "Move Eastward Happy Earth"		
"Vermin Mangle"	Cardiacs †	2020				Vocals, keyboards, guitar		
Lake of Puppies	Lake of Puppies	2024	Yes	Tim Smith; Lake of Puppies				
Cardiacs E.P.	Cardiacs †	2025				Performer	Cardiacs illlustration	
"Woodeneye"	Cardiacs †	2025	Jim Smith; Tim Smith; Kavus Torabi	Adam Noble	Nick Howiantz	Guitars, keyboards		
"Downup"	Cardiacs †	2025	Jim Smith; Tim Smith; Kavus Torabi	Adam Noble	Nick Howiantz	Guitars, keyboards		
"Volob"	Cardiacs †	2025	Jim Smith; Tim Smith; Kavus Torabi	Adam Noble	Nick Howiantz	Guitars, keyboards		
LSD	Cardiacs †	2025	Jim Smith; Tim Smith; Kavus Torabi	Adam Noble	Nick Howiantz	Voice, guitars, keyboards		
Gods and Zeros	Panixphere	2026	Bic Hayes; Jon Poole	Bic Hayes	Cameron Devlin (drums); Bic Hayes; Jon Poole (guitar, bass and vocals)		Words of "Pandy" and "More Money Than God" (with Bic Hayes), music of "More Money Than God"	
