= Pond Creek =

Pond Creek may refer to:

== Streams in the United States ==
- Pond Creek (Mill Creek), Missouri
- Pond Creek (Sac River), Missouri
- Pond Creek (Salt Fork Arkansas River), Oklahoma and Kansas
- Pond Creek (Little Wapwallopen Creek), Pennsylvania
- Pond Creek (West Virginia)

== Other places in the United States ==
- Pond Creek, Oklahoma, a city
- Pond Creek, West Virginia, an unincorporated community
- Pond Creek National Wildlife Refuge, Arkansas
- Pond Creek Station, a stagecoach station in Wallace, Kansas

== See also ==
- Ponds Creek, a creek in New South Wales, Australia
- Pond (disambiguation)
