= Guns (Cardiacs album) =

Studio album by Cardiacs
- Released: 21 June 1999 (Note: Apple Music and AllMusic indicate later release dates of 24 September and 7 December 1999 respectively. Tidal also supports the 7 December release date.)
- Studio: Apollo 8 (London)
- Genre: Rock
- Length: 45:57
- Label: Alphabet Business Concern
- Producer: Tim Smith

Cardiacs chronology
Sing to God (1996)	Guns (1999)	Cardiacs and Affectionate Friends (2001)

Singles from Guns
- 1. "Sleep All Eyes Open" Released: 5 July 1999; 2. "Signs" Released: 2 August 1999

Guns is the fifth studio album by the English rock band Cardiacs. (Note: A Little Man and a House and the Whole World Window (1988) is considered to be the band's first proper studio album. Guns is Cardiacs' eighth album if their cassette only releases The Obvious Identity (1980), Toy World (1981) and The Seaside (1984) are taken into account.) It was released on 21 June 1999 and features the four piece lineup of Tim Smith, Jim Smith, Jon Poole and Bob Leith, following the double album Sing to God four years earlier, with additional female vocalists, horn and string players added to the album. It is a rock album which forays into and draws influence from glam rock, post-punk, heavy metal, psychedelic music, folk music, electronic music, Baroque music and reggae. Tim Smith, the band's main creative force, lyrically embraced the poetic effect of the cut-up technique, and the lines of several songs draw heavily on the translation book English as She Is Spoke and the 1955 film The Night of the Hunter.

Smith completed Guns largely on his own; its sessions carried over the intimacy of his other 1999 album Pony recorded by the side project Spratley's Japs around the same time. The title of Guns and its kitsch cover of a stormy sky with two mirror image floating, grinning dog heads both play into the Dada-esque love of absurdity from Smith. It was supported by two singles, "Sleep All Eyes Open" and "Signs". Since its release, writers have considered Guns one of the band's more accessible albums, and have compared it with Sing to God regarding the albums' tones, lyrical content, coherence, expectations from fans and their impact. Their last album with Poole, Guns had been Cardiacs' most recent album for 26 years, and was thought to be their final studio album, until the release of the long-planned follow-up album LSD in 2025.

== Background and recording ==
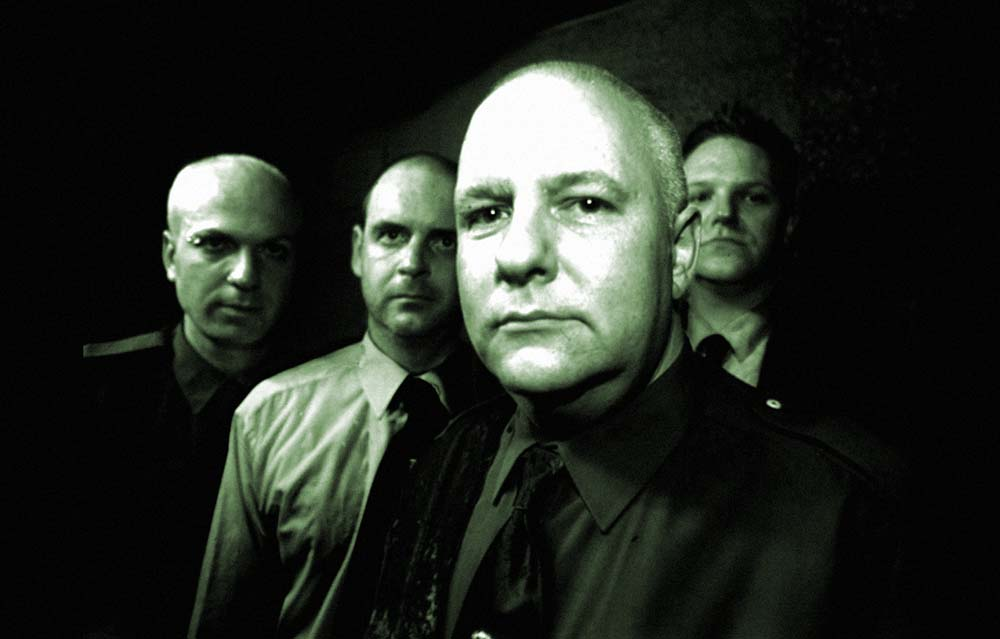
Band photo of Cardiacs circa 1999

From the 1980s through to the mid-1990s, Cardiacs were a six-piece featuring Tim Quy (percussion), Sarah Smith (saxophone), and William Drake (keyboards). The band's lineup drifted apart around the release of their second album On Land and in the Sea (1989), and after a transitional phase, Cardiacs, having always had a revolving door policy on band members, had coalesced into a four piece by the time of Guns which cohered around Cardiacs' main creative force Tim Smith and his brother Jim Smith on bass, alongside "Random" Jon Poole (guitars) and Bob Leith (drums). They had released the double album Sing to God four years earlier, which for many was the strongest entry in the band's canon, quashing doubts that the band could create the same mayhem with fewer people. As the bar had been raised, expectations were high for Guns.

Guns was recorded and mixed at Apollo 8 in London, England, marking a re-establishment of the creative team of Tim Smith and Poole, as well as Leith for some of the album's lyrics. Additional vocals were added to Guns from Tim's ex-wife Sarah Smith, alongside Jo Spratley and Sharron Saddington, later known as Sharron Fortnam. Marco Sgrignoli of the Italian publication Ondarock commented that the female vocalists' "significant and distinct contribution" on several tracks was "quite unheard of". Horns and strings were contributed by Rob Deschamps, Chris Brierly, Catherine Morgan and Mark Pharaoh. Though Tim enjoyed working with a co-pilot, he was driven enough to complete Guns largely on his own. Jim retrospectively remarked, "Tim was a bit secretive sometimes, as he was recording Guns. That just came at us with a 'here you are, it's done' kind of thing. We were like 'what?'". Guns was recorded around the same time as the album Pony, which was recorded in Autumn 1998 by the band Spratley's Japs, a side project between Tim Smith and Spratley, and also released in 1999.

== Music and themes ==
Both Sing to God and Guns display the band's harder edged, metal-leaning sound which they had retained since slimming to a four piece on 1992's Heaven Born and Ever Bright. The reviewer Stuart Benjamin of Echoes and Dust described the album as "Rock 'n' Roll with more than a touch of the baroque". According to The Quietus writer Sean Kitching, Tim Smith moved away from his core 60s British pop influences when recording Guns, due to their increasing Britpop-derived ubiquity when the scene began to emerge, and more glam rock nuances began to come to the fore on tracks such as "Spell with a Shell". Sgrignoli described Guns as a return to the band's post-punk impetuosity, maintainging the Beatlesque flair that dominated Sing to God, and the passion for contortions and stylistic blends. He suggests that the stylistic variety of Guns highlights an aspect of Cardiacs that commentators have emphasized since the first albums: the "overflowing Englishness" of the Cardiacs formula, including the "fundamental" ingredients of late beat pop, the sound of two-tone, 1977 punk and progressive rock, which have an "inescapably British connotation".

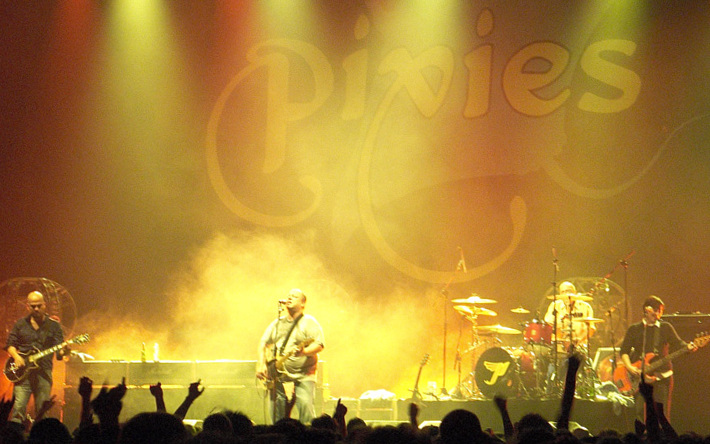
The album's use of dynamics led to the songs "There's Good Cud" and "Signs" being compared to that of the band the Pixies (pictured in 2005), an influence on Tim Smith.

The album's production is layered, featuring keyboards which "loop throughout the mix" and vocals that "come and go". Sgrignoli described the album's keyboards as "tasteless", but "fortunately flanked by some more convincing electronic forays". The writer Eric Benac noted that Tim Smith tried "a few new contemporary tricks, such as the droning sound of shoegaze and the extreme dynamics of the Pixies" and took them "to a new level by utilising his superior songwriting skills to create an ever-shifting collage of sounds that still remain pop songs". Sgrignoli commented that Saddington's balanced timbre on "Wind And Rains Is Cold", "Clean That Evil Mouth Out Your Soul" and "Will Bleed Amen" contrasted with Smith's usual "moan" and resulted in "unexpected and reassuring openness". According to Benac, Cardiacs feel "closer to the psychedelic label Tim approved of" on Guns, with "each song possessing a warmth that the often harsh Sing to God tones did not". According to Sgrignoli, Guns is considered one of the group's most accessible albums, with Benac calling it "fairly straightforward" compared to its predecessor.

Benjamin suggests that the difference between Guns and the other Cardiacs albums is that Guns has the band's musical influences "well to the fore", with the addition of "a large wall-of-sound glam-rock influence which makes the record extremely accessible, musically." He suggested that pointers to the sound of Guns are in Spratley's Japs and their album Pony, which was also released in 1999, "shares much of the DNA of Guns" and "has a very intimate feel" that "seems to have been carried over into the Guns sessions", with Tim having had a large hand in the writing and production of Pony. Uncut commented that Guns became Cardiacs' "most intimate album yet" and called it "one of Cardiacs' most heart-rending collections of songs, with a deep melancholic undertow".

Lyrically, Tim Smith embraces the cut-and-paste approach that he had occasionally toyed with, according to Benac, with all the songs on Guns featuring "strange word combinations and a sense of Burroughs-ian randomness", though retaining "an atmosphere unique to" each one. Guns features several of the lyrical themes typical of Cardiacs, including dogs and dirtiness. Another theme common throughout the album is transformation, such as the snail in "Spell With a Shell" growing wings. Benjamin said that "lyrically, Guns is as dense, wilfully confusing, and obscure as Sing to God or any other Cardiacs recording. As Tim's querulous voice squawks and shrieks through each number, the songs unfold like puzzles, offering no answers or points of navigation for those who journey with them. Perhaps the biggest puzzle is how they shoehorn those ungainly sentences and verses to fit the meter of the music, but somehow they always do."

=== Side one ===
The album opener, "Spell with a Shell", is psychedelic in texture and tone, with Benjamin describing it as "a glam-rock Bolan-esque stomp". The song mainly focuses musically on keyboard loops with a "steady drum pound" from Leith, and centres around a "one-note bass thud", while female singers make an appearance. The chorus has a dynamic shift, with the introduction of guitars and a "tricky chord progression playing out over layered voices". An extended second verse, the female chorus, and "backward keyboard lines" emphasise a feeling of tension, with the song's ending coming "abruptly on a hammered guitar line". The song's implicitly violent lyrics are of a visiting snail named by the uncertain singer and threatened for growing wings, being personally controlled in their relationship, punished and burned when the snail does not do well. In a 2021 buyer's guide to Cardiacs' albums, Dom Lawson of Classic Rock called "Spell with a Shell" "without doubt the finest song about a snail ever written". Benac noted that "Spell with a Shell" sketches out some of the album's musical themes and lyrical concepts, calling it "a somewhat strange way to start the album" but "appropriately odd".

Benac opined that the influence from the Pixies was most obvious on "There's Good Cud", which begins with a loudly-mixed sliding guitar noise that shifts into an acoustic rhythm. A distorted guitar enters between each line of the lyrics, creating a dynamic shifting sound, and the chorus "pushes into electric guitars and pummeling drum rhythms", instrumentation which is maintained as the second verse increases the song's intensity and the drums increase in pace. Another dynamic shift, in a type of mini-climax common throughout the album, contains a sustained guitar solo before "a few moments of stop-and-start", with the third verse following the same structure as the first but only featuring bass and drums in the between-line music. Lyrically, Bennac suggests that the song's perspective causes an uncertain tone similar to that of the unreliable narrator in novels or short stories, and that "good cud" perhaps "exists as a platonic ideal of itself". He questions if the line "I'm a sister's boy" is a reference to incest or a mere play on words on being a "mother's boy". Lawson compared the sound of "There's Good Cud" to "a bomb going off in a clown-shoe factory", and Benjamin called it "an electric, shouty sing-along".

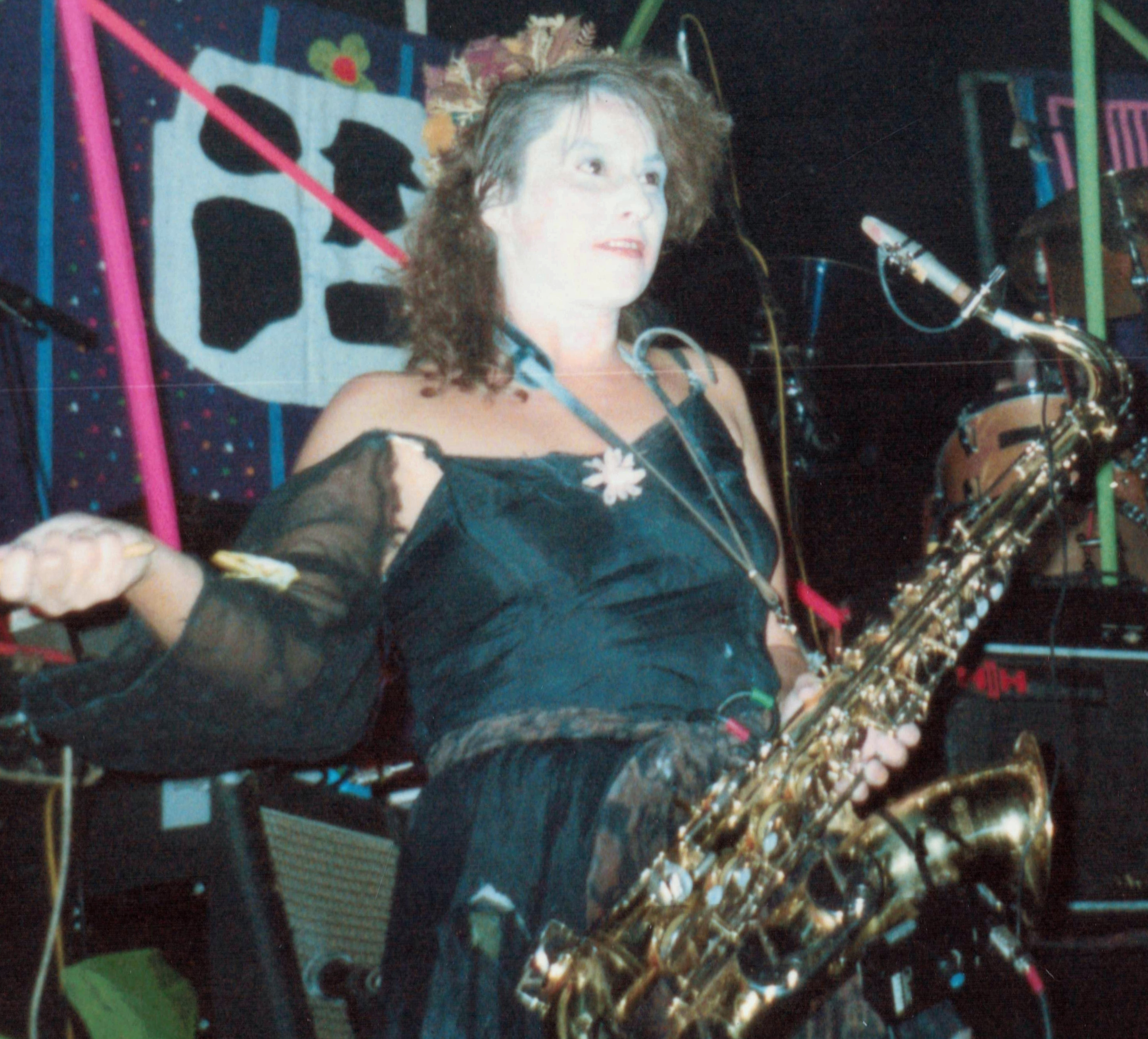
Tim Smith's ex-wife, Sarah Smith (pictured with Cardiacs in 1987), contributes vocals to "Wind and Rains Is Cold".

Lawson said that on "Wind and Rains Is Cold", Tim Smith mastered reggae. Benjamin said that it "manages, against all odds to merge ska with something approaching a medieval plainsong", and Sgrignoli called the track's "ska flourishes" a recurring element associated with Cardiacs. Leith's rhythm is mixed loud and bass is limited to one note per bar. A gentler track, Benac opined that Smith placed "Wind and Rains Is Cold" in a "perfect position to ease the tension" after the first two "frantic" ones. Lyrically, the song contains religious references and violence, with an army dashing and calling out alarms. Benac describes Tim Smith's vocal as "laid back", and Sarah's as shifting to Sea Nymphs territory with gentler music as she "beautifully" describes hair waving in the wind as being like "meadow grass under the flood". Sarah leads the song's vocal over organ chords with a "soaring sound emphasizing the album's spacey feel", with the chorus bringing a morbid "dark and brooding mood" with England-appropriate weather. The shorter verse describes somebody "a quivering" with cleanliness, while Benac suggests that Sarah's pre-chorus could show the cleanly person being turned dirty with hate and fear. Many of the lyric lines of "Wind and Rains Is Cold" and later on side two "Clean That Evil Mud Out Your Soul" come from the 1955 film The Night of the Hunter. In particular, the film inspired the line "Hide your hair, it's waving all lazy and soft like meadow grass under the flood".

Benac called "Cry Wet Smile Dry" a return to the rock sounds of past Cardiacs songs; Benjamin also categorised the song as "Bolan-esque" glam rock. The song features sustained guitar parts, distorted bass and piano, and recalls elements of sea shanties and nursery rhymes. Lawson commented that "Cry Wet Smile Dry" "uses key changes as a weapon of wonder". Benac noted that the changes were more subtle than those of past songs, and that Smith and Poole use overdubbed guitars and careful chord selection to disguise sudden transitions. The song's lyrics draw heavily on English as She Is Spoke, a translation book for teaching English to Portuguese speakers which humorously mangles the English language. Its first verse laments the uselessness of the written letter and suggests frustration in writing, while the second finds the narrator lying in bed until two o'clock in the morning lamenting their old letter.

"Jitterbug (Junior Is A)"
The key moment of the lengthy track "Jitterbug (Junior Is A)" is an instrumentation switch to deep, pulsing synthesizer and hypnotic vocals for the song's complex ending section, which forced Tim Smith to work from a score again.

Positioned towards the album's centre, "Jitterbug (Junior Is A)" is a lengthy track which has keyboards, layered arrangement and instrumental breakdowns which push the song forward. The first three minutes of "Jitterbug (Junior Is A)", which Benjamin describes as "Phil Spector style pop", feature a "warped" melody according to Kitching, "as if heard bubbling through layers of water". A simple trombone line announces new verses, which Benac called a genial piece of writing that lets the listener know the music is about to shift when it sounds. Lyrically, the singer describes feeling uncomfortable in their skin, and later verses bring up the unsettling and violent titular character Junior who is confused, agitated, and fighting against something. Benac called the lines of the third verse "disturbing in a way similar to the Residents' 'Hello Skinny'". The song's key moment comes at 2:53 with an instrumentation switch: the section from then on features pulsing, deep synthesizer, swirling organ and "hypnotic ghostly vocals", which Kitching described as "a one-man sci-fi madrigal" with "some sounds moving backwards and some forwards in time". Benjamin called the section "a choral chant punctuated by some of the squelchiest, proggiest, keyboards this side of Rick Wakeman's front room." According to Benac, the lyrics during the closing have a sense of the unconscious mind examining the world, which is backed up by the music's constant change and mood. At the end of the lyrics for "Jitterbug (Junior Is A)", the author effectively thanks the listener for sticking with the song. Kitching, who was into kosmiche music including Can and Faust when he first met Tim Smith in 1992, recalls telling Smith "the thing about repetition in a piece of music is that it changes your perception of time". Smith told Kitching after finishing "Jitterbug" that he had made the song with their conversion in mind and drawn it out longer than he otherwise would have, and he had become fond of the near twenty-minute Can track "Bel Air" which closes the album Future Days. Benac called the song's "hypnotic and fascinating" ending one of Smith's most astonishing pieces of writing, comparing it with that of "Dirty Boy" while noting that "Jitterbug"'s featured even more musical content. "Jitterbug" forced Smith to once again work from a score since abandoning score writing by Sing to God. He said the ending required "reams and reams of paper" and claimed to have sat writing the music for "36 hours solid". Benac called the track equal in complexity and scope to "Dirty Boy", and opined that it featured some of the best lyrics and most twisted melodies on the album. Mike Vennart called "Jitterbug" an "epic odyssey", while Dawson described the song as "woozy, meandering and just plain weird".

=== Side two ===
"Sleep All Eyes Open" begins with a looped guitar part similar to "Spell With a Shell". The song's glam rock influence comes to the fore as bass and drums make a simple groove whilst the straightforward verse guitar part mostly hammers on a single note. Bizarre chords and riffs appear throughout the verse, whilst the chorus includes phased vocals, organ sounds and noise guitar. The song's lyrics draw again from English as She Is Spoke—a heavy borrowing which Benac says the rich arrangement and dense sonic manipulations make hard to notice—and play on Dada nonsense as well as touching on spiritual and religious concepts at times, tying back to Sing to God. Sgrignoli called "Sleep All Eyes Open" an unprecedented hybrid of alternative dance and glam rock which "seems to directly anticipate Late of the Pier". Benjamin said that the song was "very much cut of the same cloth" as the previous glam rock tracks with its repeated ecstatic yelps of 'Hooray! Yeah!'. Benac noted the song's overall psychedelic feel with "more intense and yet hazy" music, and that Smith created a shorter, simpler track to help the lister gather their thoughts following up "Jitterbug (Junior Is A)".

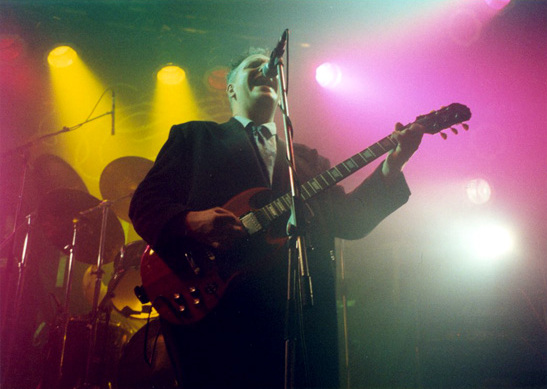
Tim Smith in March 1999

The music of "Come Back Clammy Lammy" stays consistent, with an upbeat tempo and "wild" keyboards which accentuate the guitar chords. Tim Smith "barks out six verses of intense gibberish over heavily processed guitars", which Benac compared to a pirate screaming commands at his crew, the aquatic feel being cemented by references to drowning, fathoms and barnacles. It also uses the cut-up technique of repeating and rearranging imagery in a random way, a poetic effect which Benac called "Hypnotic", and the image of a lamb, which recurs in four of the album's tracks. The third verse shifts to a faster tempo and more expansive lyrics which mention World War I. Benac suggested the possibility of Smith having attempted to tie the pirates of the first few verses to soldiers and war in general, and questioned if it was a subtle commentary of war as profit. The song features an angry staccato guitar solo which Benac said "suggests some emotion" and "is more in line with the one-note sneers of Neil Young or Pete Townshend" rather than being a sprawling solo. Smith sings of death, starving, fathoms, barnacles and tearing off clothes again in verse four, which brings a new melody and "aggression and anger" resounding. During the instrumental, a key change includes more saxophones and a brief introduction of piano. Benac suggested the song's lyrics are impressionistic and concrete, as with many of the album's songs, and commented that they were harder to understand than other songs on the album. He called the music "fairly strong" with a sound reminiscent of Heaven Born and Ever Bright, and noted that it created a "singalong" feel that sits uneasily with the lyrics, with the takeaway that violence of war and pirates should make the listener uncomfortable.

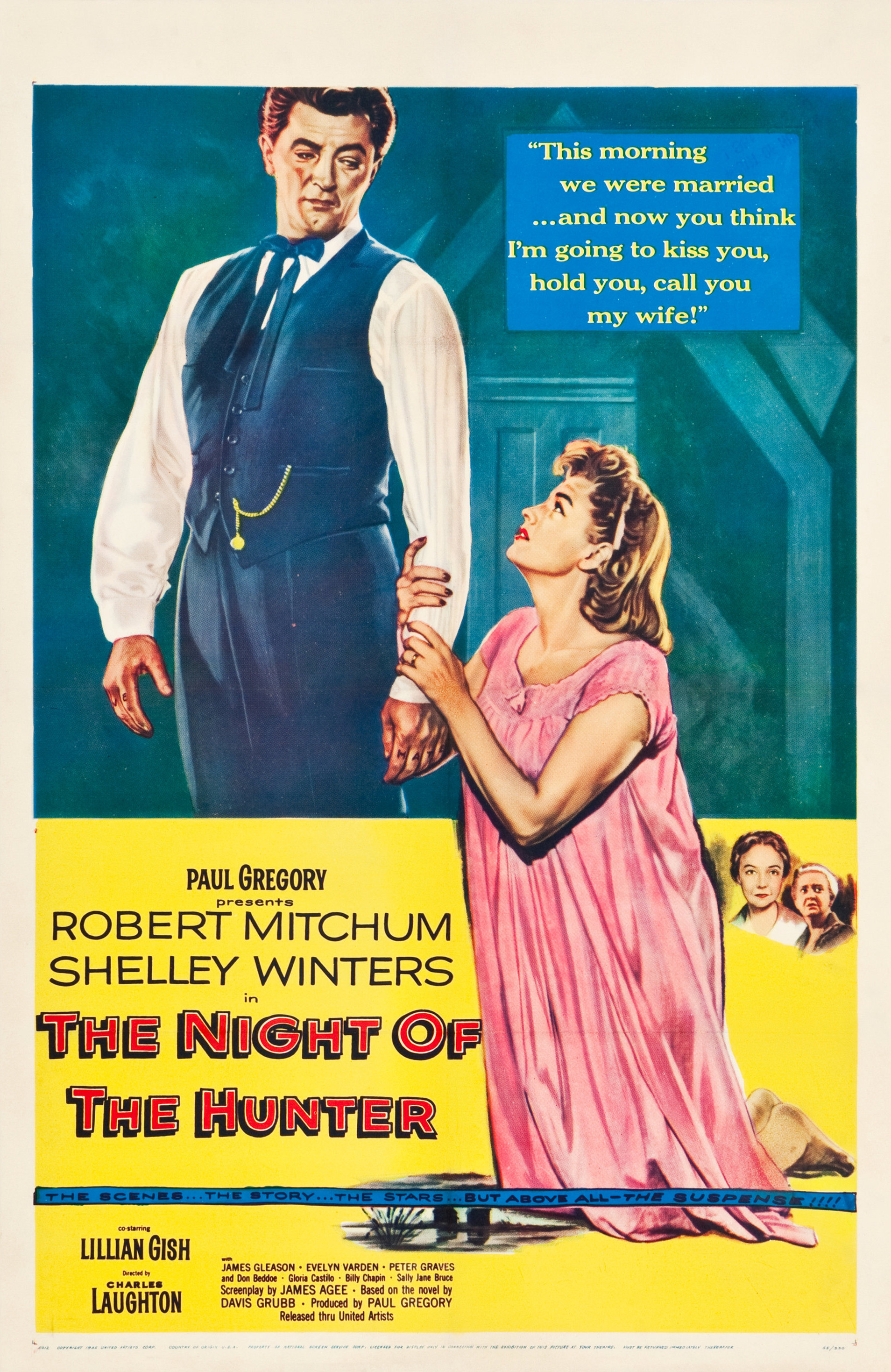
"Clean That Evil Mud Out Your Soul" reproduces the American gothic drama of the movie The Night of the Hunter, pulling its lyrics from its screenplay.

The music of "Clean That Evil Mud Out Your Soul" features guitars playing "a bizarre and almost atonal riff" over a fast bass line, and keyboards which chime like harpsichords providing the main harmonic bed for Smith's verse vocal. Sgrignoli described it as having an atmosphere of old traveling carousels with barrel organs and carillons. According to Benac, the song's lyrics ring out uneasily, in contrast to the music. The chorus features "naked" innocent-sounding vocals from Sharron Saddington which create a childlike atmosphere and increase the unease. She sings a stanza with lyrics pulled directly from The Night of the Hunter that contrast innocence with "unholy sights and sounds", referencing the misleading nature of innocence. According to Benac, Smith admitted to pulling nearly all of the song's lyrics from James Agee and Charles Laughton's screenplay to The Night of the Hunter. In verse two, Smith sings of his "own flesh and blood" and compares them to the "devil's strumpet". The concept of "the sins of the father" passing to their children occurs, reinforcing that they are the spawn of the singer's flesh and blood. Benjamin suggests that the song's title and lyrics make it sound as through "it should be at the root of some Gothic-horror or religious polemic, but wrong foots us with the immediacy of its melody and the innocent sounding backing singing." Keyboard sounds, which Benac compared to an arcade machine "giving its dying breath", transition to a post-chorus section with verse and chorus elements, including female vocals. After the last line, the music calms down and goes into another introduction variation before the chorus. They sing of "afeared little lambs" down in the dark, surrounded by flesh and blood, reproducing the American gothic drama of The Night of the Hunter.

"Ain't He Messy Though" recalls elements burrowed from folk music. Organ, bass and drums drive the music, with horn breaks between verses, and in just over two minutes, Smith integrates four verses with a bridge in the middle that shifts to a different music texture with more acoustic guitar. Verse three is a repetition of verse one lyrically, whereas the fourth changes the words and melody, and both verses have key changes. Benjamin mentioned that "Ain't He Messy Though" has a tender moment where Tim Smith sings forlornly, questioning "What's up with everyone's sad leaky / Wet and wincey eyes?". Emotions don't come easy to the singer, who cannot understand why everyone is crying all the time. Benac suggested the next lines discuss a public execution, with Tim singing that he hopes he will give "no entertainment for the crowd" when hanging, and that the bridge expresses violence, aggression and resentment.

On the song "Signs", the band plays with the concept of extreme dynamics that was common to albums and rock music at the time. The song "explodes through loud/quiet dynamics" that have been compared to that of the Pixies. Its stripped back verses shift into a "Pixies/Nirvana roar", with the dynamic shifts intensified by the arrangement details of string textures, horns and keyboards, creating "a Wagnerian feel that goes beyond grunge". The song is about "dead balloons and rocking boys, perhaps a signifier of all that passes in life". The first dynamic shift, which has the band join in as Smith sings at full volume, occasionally entering falsetto, emphasises the drama of the song's lyrics, which contain imagery of murder by gun and dry bones. The music falls into a brief organ drone before the first full verse with buoying strings and keyboards, which Benac compared to Nirvana's songbook. The "particularly powerful" first line has Tim singing to God, asking to be created in absolute isolation and alienation. The musical shifts reflect the tortured prose, where the singer compares themselves to waste being flushed down the toilet, poison and germs. Smith continually refers to the lamb, a Biblical image of innocence, in a similar usage to the Genesis song "The Lamb Lies Down on Broadway". He discusses how suffering is always temporary, and a brief return to strings brings a false sense of calm before Smith returns to the chorus melody and goes further into the bridge with more saviour, redemption, innocence and guilt imagery. The music of the bridge is lush, with organ and heavy guitar on the repeated singing of the line "No more the horse and the rocking boy". By the end of the song, Smith bleakly and nihilistically admits to being born to die alone, with a sense of satisfaction for everyone suffering the same fate. Benjamin called "Signs" "perhaps the most sublime song on the record" and exceeding the Pixies. He opined, "rarely has Tim's voice been sweeter than on this track". Vennart called "Signs" "one of Cardiacs' straighter, overt rock numbers [...] with the same 'hairdryer to the face' drama and power as the likes of 'Is This the Life?' and 'Dirty Boy'", and "one of the most painful and mortal songs I've ever heard." Benac gave "Signs" as an example of a song Tim Smith selected as a single that "should have been successful in an alternate universe".

The penultimate track, "Song of a Dead Pest", is a shorter song with the structure of three verses and an ending outro, an approach that Smith reused as a songwriter and made work by continually shifting key melody. Sgrignoli assigned "Song of a Dead Pest" the same atmosphere of carousel instruments as he did to "Clean That Evil Mud Out Your Soul". A gentle piano starts with a high-pitched bass ringing out a counterpoint and an on-the-beat snare holding the rhythm. The lyric features one of Smith's approaches: a child performing an impossible and physically grotesque act: Mandy training her head to detach itself and fly away, chasing her detached head in a perverse game of hide and seek. Instrumental colour is added between each verse, with tuned percussion adding texture to the melancholy lyrics, which talk of a death in both solemn and humorous terms as the victim "left her torso" due to being too excited to listen. The head discovers that the body is dead and that she is free, achieving liberation through grotesque to standard understanding, and leaving to explore. The music interlude plays different piano chords over the same basic rhythm, an approach which creates internal consistency, allowing for more melodic material. Verse three continues with divine intervention personified as hawks on the wing. The tuned percussion colours melodu and harmony as the music ups the ante and Leith becomes insistent, a change as the song's final verse. The song was equated by Benjamin to "something of a cautionary nursery rhyme that – in some parallel universe – mothers use to instruct and warn children", and by Benac to that of an absurdist fairy tale, a feeling "not uncommon in British folk songs or the music hall tradition. He compared the song to "a handful of Genesis songs circa Nursery Cryme", calling its theme nearly identical to that of "The Musical Box", which presents the theme more seriously.

"Will Bleed Amen", which closes the album, was described by Benjamin as "frantic, disorienting, compulsive, an ever-twirling multi-coloured maniacal musical spinning top", going "to the core of what Cardiacs are". Benac said that it "may be the album's most complex and challenging song", calling it "a zinger" and "a track that only Tim could play and only Cardiacs could perform." The song has a "heavy metal roar", with keyboards buried in the mix. The band shifts and plays with tempo and mood, and few moments repeat. Breakdowns lead to sudden shifts in chords, new melodies, palm muting and upward attacks on guitar. Benac noted how the "sheer sonic size" and diversity of the elements of the song pound the listener. The lyrics have elements of war and violence, with thousands of people being attacked and killed, black dogs appearing throughout, and references to God, Jesus and Eden. Benac gives the song's overall feeling as of an apocalypse of ultimate destruction and doom. The song fades out over Smith's vocals, leaving a lengthy silence. CD versions of Guns have a secret track, or bonus track, which Benac called "Secret Like Swans" and Benjamin called "As Secret As Swans". Benjamin said "Swans" sounds "as if Tim has suddenly come over all Butthole Surfers"; "a song you could imagine sitting happily in the sessions for Independent Worm Saloon." Benac suggested the line "dressing up like a princess in secret, like swans", as a lyric addendum to "Will Bleed Amen", revealed the hypocrisy of the situation of sending families to their death, as swans are both beautiful and cruel. The track ends with distoted guitar, bass, drums and Tim singing "lalala" over the top.

== Title and cover ==
The album's cover, which Sgrignoli calls "very kitsch", uses a stormy sky of black clouds in a "sepia greeny-grey" background, with Cardiacs in large letters sprawled across the front. In contrast to the dark and gothic elements, the mirror image of the face of a "big friendly dog" creates two floating, grinning dog heads which occupy the top left and right corners. Dogs are a recurring element associated with Cardiacs, big dogs being one of their "lyrical obsessions". According to the author Eric Benic, the cover matches the album's lyrical confusion, and the album title Guns also plays into Tim Smith's Dada-esque love of absurdity. He commented "What do 'guns' and those grinning dog heads have to do with anything on the album? Nothing, and yet everything." Benac suggested that the album's "somewhat muted response" could be explained by its randomised elements.

According to Jim Smith, Tim's original plan for the cover was to use a painting of a kangaroo that he saw on the wall of a pub in Hungerford, which he bought from the landlady. Due to a mass shooting having happened in Hungerford, Tim decided when he arrived home that to use the painting on an album called Guns would be in bad taste, and the plan was shelved. The kangaroo was used as the cover of the follow-up album LSD (2025) after it ended up on Tim's wall at home.

== Release and promotion ==
Guns, released by the Alphabet Business Concern, was announced to be available in record shops from 21 June 1999, a release date which the album's page on the streaming service Deezer supports. Its release came just after Cardiacs finished their UK tour.

The first single from Guns, "Sleep All Eyes Open", released as a split CD single, or EP, with Camp Blackfoot on 5 July 1999 by Org Records, after being delayed several times from mid-April and 24 May. The second single, "Signs", released on 2 August 1999 as the first on Alphabet after being delayed slightly from its initial date 28 July, with the song accompanied by two unreleased tracks (one being the instrumental version of “Dog Like Sparky,” from Sing to God). The single was the last by the band's power quartet lineup and features the B-side "Sang 'All Away Away!'", with production similar to that of Guns.

== Reception ==
Professional ratings
Review scores
Source	Rating
Encyclopedia of Popular Music	3/5 stars
Uncut	8/10

In a review of Guns before its release, the Organ zine called it "everything we needed it to be and a little bit more" and opined that it was "far more coherent that [sic] Sing to God, far more focused and concentrated, no messing about, straight in there", dubbing the album "Cardiacs' big statement". Benac suggested that "maybe fans expecting another Sing to God were let down" from Guns being "fairly straightforward" in comparison, and opined that "Will Bleed Amen" lived up to Sing to God's expectations more than any other song. Reviewing Cardiacs live at The Garage in 2004, Martijn Voorvelt of the magazine Perfect Sound Forever thought that Guns was the band's least rewarding album. In 2014, Joseph Stannard of The Wire called Guns "similarly arresting" to Sing to God, another album made by the Smith-Poole partnership. Benjamin said in 2015 "perhaps it was inevitable that some were underwhelmed with Guns when it finally reached their sweaty, shaking, hands. Where were the explosions? The fire? The burning crucible of sound and surrealist imagery that made Sing to God exceptional?", calling the latter album a tough act to follow, but that time had "been kind to Guns and listening to it today, it just seems to go from strength to strength." On the debate whether Guns was a weaker entry in the Cardiacs discography, he defended the album as "an evolution of sorts", saying the band "could never be accused of standing still – even when the gaps between records became longer" and that "each track on Guns is a treat and has more ideas in each of the songs than many bands pack into an entire lifetime". He called the album "as good a place as any to start" for those who were not yet fans of Cardiacs and remarked that both Guns and Pony "seem to talk to you directly – if such a thing is possible in the usual amalgam of oblique images and sounds that mark Tim's oeuvre."

In a 2015 article about Cardiacs by Mike Vennart for Prog, he called Guns "surprisingly mild-mannered", "more muted, soulful and sombre than all other Cardiacs albums, perhaps leaning more into the sci-fi folksy lullabies of Tim's side-project, the Sea Nymphs", "darker and more human" than Sing to God, and "immensely rich in timbre and ideas." In 2025, Vennart reflected that Guns had "a certain sadness" and commented that he felt Guns was Tim Smith's "most human album". In a 2021 buyer's guide to Cardiacs' albums, Dom Lawson of Classic Rock said "From 1989's still startling On Land and in the Sea to the twinkling squall of Guns a decade later, Smith matched his band's on-stage prowess with records to cherish" and that, although Smith was reportedly not happy with the sound of Guns, it "sparkles and delights with tons of their customary cracked charm". Benac called Guns "a great collection" when "listened to free of context and expectations", "a fantastic, cleanly recorded, dynamic, exciting, diverse and fun rock album", and praised the album's layered production as "among the finest" of Tim Smith's career.

In 2022, Sgrignoli said that the album has "no shortage of noteworthy moments", but that its sound and songwriting were less overall impactful than on Sing to God. In a 2025 Cardiacs buyer's guide for an article covering the album LSD, the magazine Uncut called Guns "a reflective set, by Cardiacs standards, where Tim Smith seems to be taking stock of the complexities of life", saying "some of his most affecting songs are here, though it still pedals through genres like nobody's business."

== Aftermath ==
According to The Rough Guide to Rock, the release of Guns sparked a "rather green patch for Cardiacs fans" as it was followed in quick succession by the compilations Songs by Cardiacs and Affectionate Friends (2001) and Greatest Hits (2002); the latter package included the song "Faster than Snakes with a Ball and a Chain", which was originally intended for Guns and later released in January 2025 on a vinyl 7" single with Aaron Tanner and Melodic Virtue's book Cardiacs: A Big Book and a Band and the Whole World Window. Following Guns, Cardiacs started working on a new album which did not take shape and was eventually shelved, according to Sgrignoli. The band's concert schedule thinned out, and a tradition of large-scale annual dates around November at the London Astoria began, joined by previous bandmembers and groups who have named Cardiacs as a significant influence.

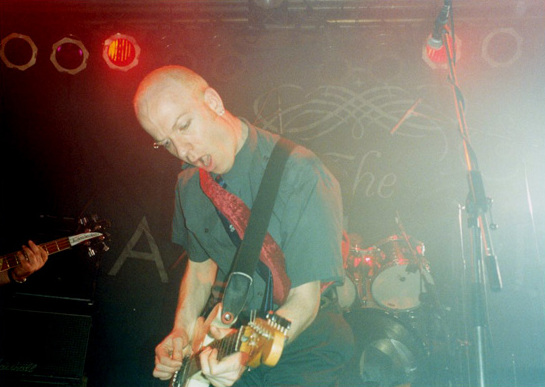
Guns was the band's last album with Jon Poole (pictured in 1999), who retrospectively criticised the album for its track order, mixing and lack of collaboration.

Guns was Cardiacs' last album with multi-instrumentalist Jon Poole, who went to play bass with the Wildhearts. Poole called the album his least favourite by Cardiacs and said that he felt disconnected from it because it didn't seem to capture the collaboration he had had with Sing to God. Poole was also displeased with the track ordering and some of the mixes of the songs, particularly "Cry Wet Smile Dry", but thought the album still had "really good moments".

The band had the appearance of a hiatus, but returned in the mid-2000s with a change of personnel and recorded the double live set Garage Concerts, which revamps nearly all their material prior to their first CD, 1988's A Little Man and a House and the Whole World Window, including that which had never been widely released or was otherwise unavailable. However, new material was sparse. In October 2007, Cardiacs were preparing their first studio album of new material since Guns, which was due for release in early 2008, and their first full UK tour since 2000. In November 2007, the 3-song EP "Ditzy Scene" appeared, teasing the upcoming double album LSD, but Tim Smith had a series of strokes which put the band indefinitely on hold in 2008.

Guns was reissued on vinyl in 2015, and appeared on streaming services to be accessed online witth the band's back-catalogue in January 2021. Guns was the final full-length of eight albums released by the group during their three-decade run, beginning with 1980's The Obvious Identity as Cardiac Arrest. It remained Cardiacs' most recent album for 26 years, and was thought to be their final studio album, as the follow-up LP LSD was unreleased. Several tales, some apocryphal, surrounded the legend of LSD, and Benjamin remarked that "it is that by default Guns remains effectively the last word on Cardiacs", as Smith would not be well enough to complete its follow-up. On Guns' position as Cardiacs' last album, Benac commented that Cardiacs avoided the fate of most bands, "simply ending their career a sub-par record that's not up to their usual standard", which he named It's Hard (1982) by the Who an example of (discarding the two post-John Entwistle albums), and that Guns "seems to move forwards and promise new directions that were never entirely undertaken when LSD was not finished." However, he opined that Guns was "imperfect" and "not a career-defining work" like the previous album Sing to God could be argued to have been, and that LSD may have served as "an even bigger triumph" than Sing to God had Tim Smith's stroke or earlier struggles not ended the band's progress. Because of this, Benac said that "history and fan opinion is often divided on it's [sic] qualities" and that Guns had the same fate as Heaven Born and Ever Bright since both have a significant fan base but "came after high points in the band's career and may not seem to live up to them". He said it was clear that, like Heaven Born and Ever Bright, Guns was "likely a setup for something grander: like the single or bunt that leads to a grand slam" and thought it a shame that the "more psychedelic side" of Guns "wasn't explored to its logical conclusion with a follow-up album".

Cardiacs kept working on LSD after Tim's illness and death, and LSD released in 2025. Jim Smith described LSD before it had been mastered as "kind of floating somewhere between Sing to God and Guns, with lots of call backs to Little Man and a House in there as well." In a review for LSD, Kitching said the album was identifiable as a logical development from Guns, with the production by Adam Noble having "a greater clarity and warmth than Smith's own on Sing To God or Guns".

== Track listing ==
All tracks are written by Tim Smith. Riffs and arrangements by Jon Poole and Tim Smith; additional lyrics by Bob Leith.

No.	Title	Guest vocalist(s)	Length
1.	"Spell with a Shell"	Sarah Smith; Sharron Saddington	3:17
2.	"There's Good Cud"		2:17
3.	"Wind and Rains Is Cold"	S. Smith; Saddington^{[a]}	3:20
4.	"Cry Wet Smile Dry"		3:27
5.	"Jitterbug (Junior Is A)"		7:31
6.	"Sleep All Eyes Open"	Joanne Spratley	2:58
7.	"Come Back Clammy Lammy"	Spratley	4:07
8.	"Clean That Evil Mud Out Your Soul"	Saddington	2:25
9.	"Ain't He Messy Though"		2:03
10.	"Signs"		4:25
11.	"Song of a Dead Pest"		2:37
12.	"Will Bleed Amen"	Saddington	7:31
Total length:			45:57

Notes

- ^{^[a]} Saddington is not credited on "Wind and Rains Is Cold" on streaming services.
- "Will Bleed Amen" contains a hidden track titled "Secret Like Swans" which begins after 50 seconds of silence.

== Personnel ==
Adapted from liner notes of Guns and AllMusic.

- Bob Leith – drums
- Jon Poole – guitar, keyboards, vocals
- Tim Smith – guitar, keyboards, lead vocals
- Jim Smith – bass, vocals

With:

- Sarah Smith – saxophones, vocals on "Spell with a Shell" and "Wind and Rains Is Cold"
- Joanne Spratley – vocals on "Sleep All Eyes Open" and "Come Back Clammy Lammy"
- Sharron Saddington – vocals on "Spell with a Shell", "Wind and Rains Is Cold", "Clean That Evil Mud..." and "Will Bleed Amen"
- Chris Brierly, Catherine Morgan, Mark Pharaoh, Robert Woolard – string quartet
- Rob Deschamps – trombone, French horn

Technical

- Captin John Hooks – art direction, supervisor
- Kavus Torabi – guitar technician, stage technician
