= Pond (disambiguation) =

A pond is a small body of standing water.

Pond may also refer to:

== Places ==
- Pond, California, United States, an unincorporated community
- Pond, Missouri, United States, a former unincorporated community
- Pond River, Kentucky, United States
- Pond Creek (disambiguation)
- The pond, an informal term for the Atlantic Ocean
- Sand Pits Lake, Ottawa, Ontario, Canada, an artificial lake also known as The Pond

== Music ==
- Pond (American band), a rock band
- Pond (Australian band), a psychedelic rock band
- The Pond (album), a 2012 Kathryn Williams album
- "Pond", a song from the album Pony by Spratleys Japs

== Other uses ==
- Pond (surname), including a list of people with the surname
- Honda Center, an indoor arena in Anaheim, California, nicknamed "The Pond" when it was formerly known as Arrowhead Pond
- Slang for ice rink
- The Pond (intelligence organization), a small, secret espionage organization operated by the US government from 1942 to 1955
- Pond (book), a 2015 collection of short stories
- An obsolete metric unit of force - see kilopond

== See also ==
- Pond's, an American health and beauty care brand
- Ponds (disambiguation)
- Nowy Staw (New Pond), a village in Pomeranian Voivodeship, Poland
