= Cardiacs and Affectionate Friends =

Compilation album by Cardiacs and various artists
- Released: 6 August 2001 (Note: AllMusic gives a release date of 16 July.)
- Length: 73:03
- Label: Org; All My Eye and Betty Martin
- Compiler: Tim Smith

Cardiacs chronology
| Guns (1999) | Cardiacs and Affectionate Friends (2001) | Greatest Hits (2002) |

Professional ratings
Review scores
| Source | Rating |
|---|---|
| Encyclopedia of Popular Music | 3/5 stars |

Cardiacs and Affectionate Friends (Note: The spine and CD includes the text "Cardiacs and Affectionate Friends", although the title is written as "A Remorseless and Insouciant Compendium of Songs by Cardiacs and Affectionate Friends" on the cover.) is a compilation album published by Org Records, the record label associated with the Organ fanzine, and All My Eye and Betty Martin Music. It collects recent songs by Cardiacs and associated projects featuring Tim Smith, including Spratleys Japs, the Sea Nymphs and OceanLandWorld (1995). Other acts include Mikrokosmos (Bic Hayes), Catherine in a Cupboard (Bob Leith and Jim Smith), Lake of Puppies (William D. Drake) and solo tracks by Drake, Mark Cawthra and Jon Poole.

== Track listing ==
All tracks are written by Tim Smith, except where noted.

| No. | Title | Writer(s) | Artist | Length |
|---|---|---|---|---|
| 1. | "Cabinet" | | Spratleys Japs | 10:59 |
| 2. | "No Gold" | | Cardiacs | 3:32 |
| 3. | "Hold Like Mother's Hand" | Bic Hayes | mikrokosmos | 3:47 |
| 4. | "Jitterbug (Junior Is A)" | | Cardiacs | 7:31 |
| 5. | "Fiery Pyre" | William D. Drake | Drake | 2:47 |
| 6. | "Wireless" | | Cardiacs | 8:14 |
| 7. | "Hazel" | | Spratleys Japs | 3:01 |
| 8. | "Appealing to Venus" | | The Sea Nymphs | 2:33 |
| 9. | "Eden on the Air" | | Cardiacs | 2:21 |
| 10. | "Swimming with the Snake" | | Oceanland World | 6:27 |
| 11. | "Building Cakes" | Bob Leith; Gary McGuinness; arr. Dave Murder | Catherine in a Cupboard | 4:09 |
| 12. | "Truth Be Told" | Mark Cawthra | Cawthra | 4:49 |
| 13. | "Swim My Own Blood" | Jon Poole | Poole | 4:42 |
| 14. | "Foundling" | | Cardiacs | 4:43 |
| 15. | "Largelife" | Drake; Sharron Saddington | The Lake of Puppies | 3:28 |
| Total length: | | | | 73:03 |

== Personnel ==
Adapted from the Cardiacs and Affectionate Friends liner notes.

- Tim Smith – compilation
- Marina Anthony – artwork
