= Ponds (disambiguation) =

Ponds or The Ponds may refer to:

== Places ==
- The Ponds, New South Wales, a suburb of Sydney, Australia
- The Ponds, New Jersey, United States, a census-designated place
- Ponds Creek, New South Wales, Australia

== People ==
- Antwaune Ponds (born 1975), American former football player
- D'Angelo Ponds, American college football player
- Fernandez Ponds (born 1959), retired United States Navy rear admiral
- Shamorie Ponds (born 1998), American basketball player

== See also ==
- Island of Ponds, Labrador, Canada
- Pond's, an American brand of beauty and health care products
- Pond (disambiguation)
