= Pond Creek (Mill Creek tributary) =

Stream in the American state of Missouri

Coordinates: 37.979773°N 90.666518°W

Pond Creek is a stream in Washington County in the U.S. state of Missouri. It is a tributary of Mill Creek.

Pond Creek was so named on account of ponds near its headwaters.

== See also ==
- List of rivers of Missouri
