= Pond Creek (Sac River tributary) =

Stream in the US state of Missouri

Pond Creek is a stream in Greene County in the U.S. state of Missouri. It is a tributary of the Sac River.

The headwaters are just north of U.S. Route 60 and Republic at 37°08′34″N 93°26′28″W and the confluence with the Sac is north of I-44 and just south of Missouri Route 266 two mile east of Plano at 37°12′10″N 93°30′46″W.

Pond Creek flows near ponds, hence the name.

== See also ==
- List of rivers of Missouri
