= Guided selling =

Guided selling is a process that helps potential buyers of products or services to choose the product best fulfilling their needs and hopefully guides the buyer to buy. It also helps vendors of products (e.g. brands, retailer) to actively guide their customers to a buying decision and thus increases their conversion rate.

Guided selling simplifies and automates the maintenance and deployment of all knowledge that is required to analyze customer needs, define the solution, and generate a proposal to fulfill those needs. A functional definition of the solution is provided to the customer, complete with commercial aspects of the proposal, such as prices, margins, texts, illustrations, and lay-outs. In addition, the technical specification of the solution (such as bills of materials and routings) is generated for manufacturing and distribution.

== Process and Practice ==
Guided selling is put in practice with an information system that supports the central management and maintenance of knowledge; furthermore, the system supports the use of this knowledge by web services such as online product advisors, customers, dealers and sales representatives. Such knowledge is stored in semantic knowledge models; these models are interacted with by means of questionnaires and explanations to / feedback options to product recommendations. The knowledge stored is related to functional, commercial and technical aspects of the customer needs and the possible solutions. The proposal-specific functions of guided selling are recommender systems, product advisors, product configuration, technical calculations, commercial calculations and document generation.

Guided selling solutions are applied in the following use cases:

- Websites of online shops, product manufacturer websites and service providers. Guided selling solutions are used to analyse user requirements and generate buying recommendations to make sure online shoppers find the product best fitting to their needs
- Kiosk applications, call center solutions and in-store devices in specialized trade stores. The goal is to help the potential buyer and / or the sales representative or service agent to efficiently guide through the product selection and purchasing process.

Guided selling does not address the internal, private, offline, or behind-the-scenes decision issues that buyers must address before they are ready to make a solution choice.

== Goal and Approach ==
The goal of guided selling solutions is to bring together potential buyer's needs and products or services that fulfill his needs in order to facilitate buying decisions. The guided selling system asks questions and offers answer options that help the online shopper to learn about and define his needs, even for complex and technical solutions. At the same time, the vendor understands step by step the refined customer needs. Guided selling systems increase the shopping experience and the usability of the website since they typically offer a better access to the product assortment than done by filtering systems or free text search.

== Guided Selling Process ==
Guided selling systems put in practice the following guided selling process to advice, convince and sell (based on the need/solution-placement dynamic):

- Understand the customer's needs: The potential customer is asked for his buying needs. The product characteristics that are relevant to a buying decision are explained. Since the guided selling system explains product attributes and use cases, buyers are enabled to express their needs, refine existing needs and discover new needs. Helping the customer to understand his needs and then really understand the attributes important to him is key to calculate product recommendations that fit the customer's requirements.
- Analyse customer's needs: Consumers typically can express buying desires, but not technical specs - a consumer knows how he wants to use the product, but not which exact technical requirements are needed. A Guided selling system must thus be able to translate buying desires expressed in consumer language (e.g. "I need a business notebook") or concrete, but non-technical product attributes ("a fast processor") in technical product specifications (e.g. a certain processor type, hard disk size, operating system, RAM-size).
- Recommend products: The technical product specifications inferred from the customer's needs need to be matched on the fact sheets of the available products. In order to calculate valuable product recommendations, it is not enough to filter out products that just fulfill the requirements expressed by the user. However, all relevant product attributes need to be evaluated and matched against the user requirements. Product attributes that are always beneficial (e.g. longer battery lifetime) need to be treated accordingly. If no product fulfills all requirements, the guided selling system needs to calculate alternatives that come close to the actual requirements.
- Provide buying arguments and convince the customer: The goal of the guided selling system is to objectively advise the potential buyer, create trust in the product recommendations and the products offered and thus turn prospects into buyers. Thus, each product recommendation needs to be explained using a reasoning engine and the advantages / disadvantages of each recommendation need to be shown.

== Guided Selling in B2B Sales ==
Traditionally, the guided selling concept is used in an e-commerce context. In a classic B2C or e-commerce, no-touch sales model, the role of guided selling revolves around helping customers choose the product/service best fitting their needs. In 2020, guided selling principles were applied to the B2B sales process. The shift was predicted and analyzed by many research agencies, including Gartner, Forrester, and TOPO.

Multiple research reports conclude that guided selling is expanding to B2B sales practices to address the drastic changes that the COVID-19 pandemic has brought to the sales process.

In a sales model that involves salespeople working with customers, dynamic guided selling is used as a seller-centric solution providing next step suggestions for sellers to take at any given moment. Reports also outline the new realities of the marketplace that have changed buyers’ behavior and forced sales teams to deploy algorithmic-guided selling.

Since early 2020, the term guided selling also refers to technology applied in B2B sales, with several key capabilities:

- Providing step-by-step guidance to sales representatives using contextualized notifications and alerts. These alerts give specific suggestions on what steps sales representatives need to take in order to follow an established process, playbook, or strategy in each sales deal or customer communication.
- Bringing visibility to the sales pipeline, sales deals, and sales team activity by automatically collecting data and analyzing it with AI.
- Giving sales operations instruments to control sales cycles, implement and automate playbooks, and make changes to the sales process.
- Showing which sales deals are at risk of not being won and prioritizing tasks that will have an impact on the closure of the deal based on AI analysis.

Guided selling software is based on AI that captures business and sales-related data from multiple channels of communication and uses machine learning to analyze it and find correlations between actions and success. It then creates contextualized suggestions based on the patterns and correlations found. Because every buyer-seller interaction is different, guided selling is dynamic and adaptable to unique use cases, industries, markets, etc.

== Technology Required ==
Guided selling solutions are software systems. The Guided selling software allows to simulate a dialog to find out the buyer's needs. A matching technology then maps the needs on technical product details and matches the buyer's profile with the available products. Guided selling systems are a kind of Recommender systems. Other than Collaborative filtering that calculates recommendations based on historical data (e.g. website usage data such as "users who watched this product also watched these other products"), Guided selling systems rather analyse the individual user's input to calculate recommendations that best fulfill his personal needs. Guided selling systems thus require product information (fact sheets). Goal of this approach is to calculate objective recommendations that are based on the individual user's needs.

== Boundaries ==
Guided selling systems are different from static Recommender systems in the way that statistical recommenders calculate recommendations based on usage data instead of the actual user input to a questionnaire. The advantage of guided selling to recommender systems is an objectively calculated product proposal and a needs-based product advice that usually has a higher quality than products suggested by recommender systems. The drawback is that guided selling systems need domain-specific knowledge about the product category whereas recommender systems (at least Collaborative filtering) can work across all product categories of e.g. a website.

== See also ==
- Product finder
- Customer engagement
- Preference elicitation
- Recommendation system
- Similarity search
- The Long Tail
- Online lead generation

== Sources ==
- J. Lester, K. Branting, B. Mott: Conversational agents, Practical handbook of Internet computing, 2004, S. 3ff
- Sridhar Seshadri, Dana Popescu: Inventory and Ecommerce, Department of Information, Operations and Management Science, Leonard Stern School of Business, New York University, New York, NY 10012
