= Tim Smith's Extra Special OceanLandWorld =

Studio album by Tim Smith (Note: Tim Smith is credited as the lead artist on Apple Music, although Cardiacs are credited on the Bandcamp release of the album. The appearance of "Swimming With the Snake" on Cardiacs and Affectionate Friends is credited to OceanLandWorld or Oceanland World.)
- Released: 1995
- Recorded: 1989–1990
- Genre: Britpop
- Length: 45:26
- Label: Alphabet Business Concern
- Producer: Tim Smith

Tim Smith's Extra Special OceanLandWorld (Note: Also written Tim Smith's Extra Special Oceanland World) is the only solo album by Tim Smith of the English rock band Cardiacs, released in 1995 and recorded between 1989 and 1990. The song "Veronica in Ecstasy" also appeared on the Cardiacs compilation album Sampler (1995).

== Track listing ==
All tracks are written by Tim Smith.

No.	Title	Length
1.	"Exploded"	2:49
2.	"Rat Mice Lice Time"	4:07
3.	"This Grounds Town"	5:17
4.	"Savour"	2:59
5.	"Swimming with the Snake"	6:30
6.	"England’s"	2:59
7.	"Ocean Shipwreck"	7:17
8.	"Bug from Heaven"	2:48
9.	"Veronica in Ecstasy"	4:22
10.	"Ocean Heaven"	6:18
Total length:		45:26

== Personnel ==
Tim Smith - All instruments and vocals, except saxophones on "England's" which are by Sarah Smith
