= Tim Smith (Cardiacs) =

British musician and frontman of Cardiacs

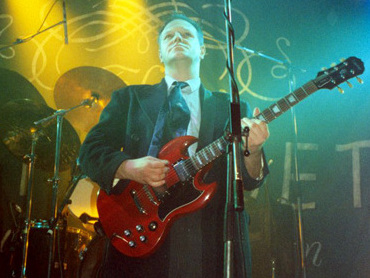
- Smith with Cardiacs at The Garage in 1999
- Born: Timothy Charles Smith; 3 July 1961; Carshalton, Surrey, England
- Died: 21 July 2020 (aged 59)
- Occupations: Musician; singer; songwriter; producer; video director
- Works: Discography
- Spouse: Sarah Cutts (m. 1983, divorced) (Note: Separated in the early 1990s)
- Relatives: Jim Smith (brother)
- Musical career
- Origin: Chessington, Surrey
- Genres: Rock; psychedelic pop; chamber music
- Instruments: Vocals; guitar; keyboards; bass
- Years active: 1975–2008
- Label: Alphabet Business Concern
- Formerly of: Gazunder; Cardiacs; Mr & Mrs Smith & Mr Drake; Sea Nymphs; Panixphere; Spratleys Japs

Timothy Charles Smith (3 July 1961 – 21 July 2020) was an English musician, record producer and music video director. A singer, songwriter and multi-instrumentalist, Smith rose to prominence as the frontman of the rock band Cardiacs, which he co-founded with his brother Jim. In addition to Cardiacs, Smith led, co-led or contributed to the Sea Nymphs, Panixphere, Tim Smith's Extra Special OceanLandWorld and Spratleys Japs. Recognised for the particular complexity, skill and idiosyncrasies of his songs and music, Smith was honoured with the Doctor of Music degree from the Royal Conservatoire of Scotland in 2018, two years before his death in 2020.

Smith was also a producer of records or promotional videos for acts including Oceansize, Sepultura, Dark Star, The Frank and Walters, Sidi Bou Said, Eat, the Scaramanga Six and Wildhearts frontman Ginger.

== Early life ==
Timothy Charles Smith was born on 3 July 1961 in Carshalton, Surrey, England. He grew up in Chessington where he was primarily raised by his mother Eileen, a dinner lady at the primary school he attended with his older brother Jim. His father Ernie, a big band jazz trumpeter, died suddenly when Smith was 3. He and Jim acquired an interest in music around 1972 from their neighbourhood friend Geoff Shelton buying an electric guitar. Jim Smith bought a bass guitar so that he and Geoff could play a blues riff together, while Smith owned a snare drum and would drum with them. The next year, Shelton lent Smith an LP on how to play the guitar, teaching him to play the G chord during a visit. Smith learnt the song "Frankie and Johnny", and played it whilst his mum sang. Around the same time, he heard a section on a record that "[made] his stomach go funny and [gave] him goosebumps". It changed his perception of music, and may have inspired the sound of his compositions. After that, Jim stopped playing bass until 1977. Smith grew up on music like Gong and Peter Gabriel's Genesis.

Some songs written by Smith at around age 13, notably "Interlude" from their debut album and "Billion" from Sing to God, would later be made into Cardiacs tracks. In an interview, Smith commented about his songs written at a young age:

It depends on what year they were done, but we were really only youngsters then. A few songs have popped up on the later albums that I wrote when I was about thirteen. The one on Sing to God called "Billion", I did it when I was thirteen. Sometimes I put an old one on that I made when I was little, just for luck. "Interlude" on A Little Man and a House ... is another one. I just found it laying around on a bit of paper and thought "Ah, let's stick that one on it!" It's all for superstitious reasons, really.

Smith attended Fleetwood Secondary School in Chessington with his friend Colvin Mayers. There, he met Mark Cawthra and Peter Tagg, who would later play in Cardiacs. In 1975, Smith and Cawthra formed an unnamed group with organist David Philpot. They played instrumentals inspired by Egg. The band never played live and Dave Philpot died a few years later. His miniKORG synthesiser was later inherited by Cardiacs.

Cawthra was suspended from school and, after staying at the Kaleidoscope hostel in Kingston, moved to York. During that time, he and Smith would send each other tapes of unkind songs they had written for each other.

== Career ==
=== Cardiacs formation, demos and line-up changes: 1977–1984 ===
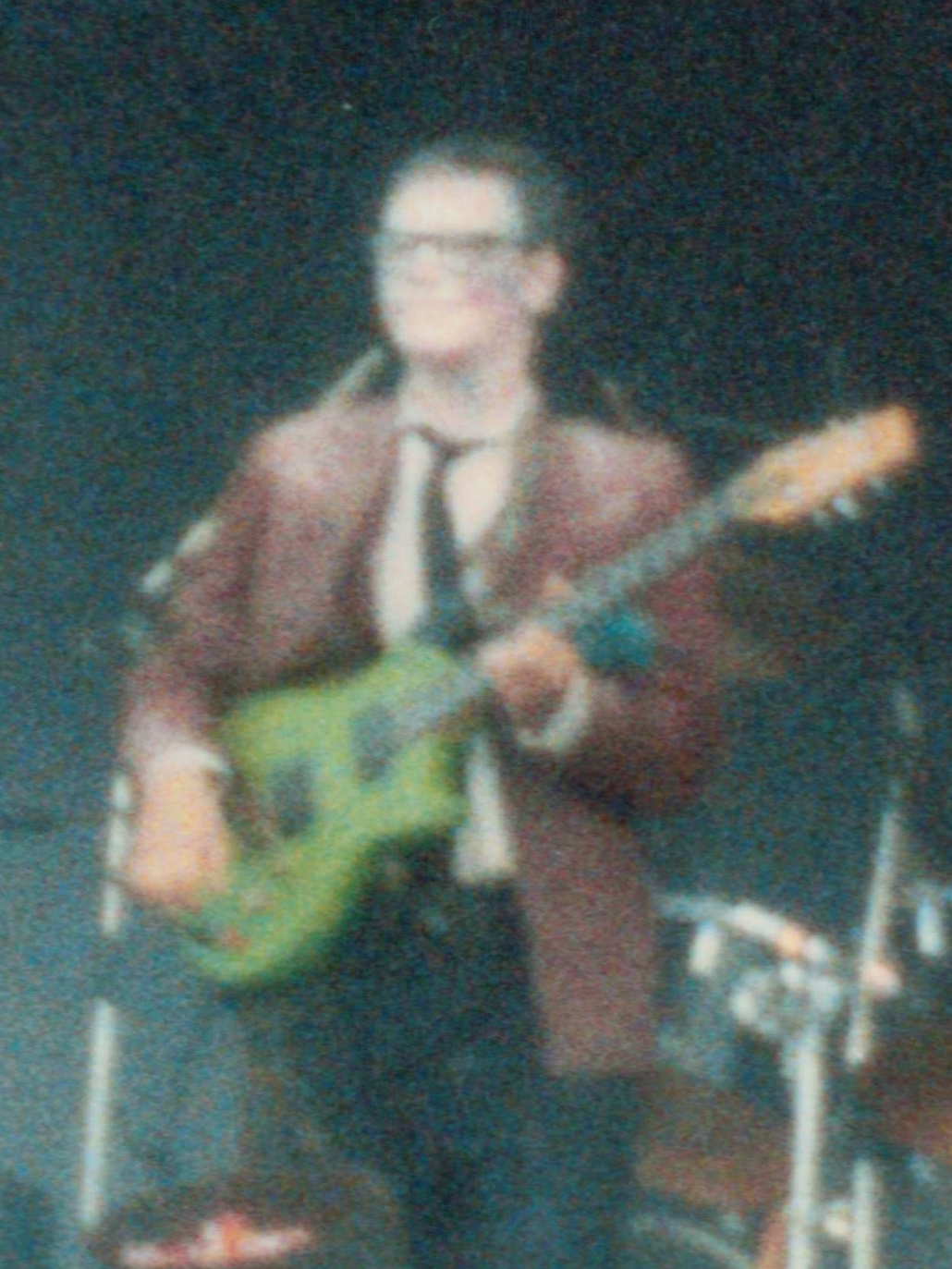
Smith with Cardiacs in 1986

In 1975, Smith began his musical career after forming a nameless band at school in which he played guitar. He played his first gig at the age of 16 as Gazunder alongside the Outsiders frontman Adrian Borland and rock drummer Bruce Bizland at Surbiton Assembly Rooms, which sounded like the rock instrumentals on David Bowie's The Man Who Sold the World (1970), and drew inspiration for his first guitar experiments after having briefly played bass before passing the task to Jim. Through Tim's membership of the early Borland group, Cardiacs would be connected to Borland and his later band the Sound. Smith formed the band that would become Cardiacs in 1977 as the Filth, sometimes misremembered as "Philip Pilf and the Filth". The same year, the Filth wrote the song "Icky Qualms" and played their first gig at the Kaleidoscope hostel, "a hostel for misfits and that". Smith formed the group with Peter Tagg on drums, Jim on bass, Michael Pugh on lead vocals and originally took on guitar and backing vocal duties.

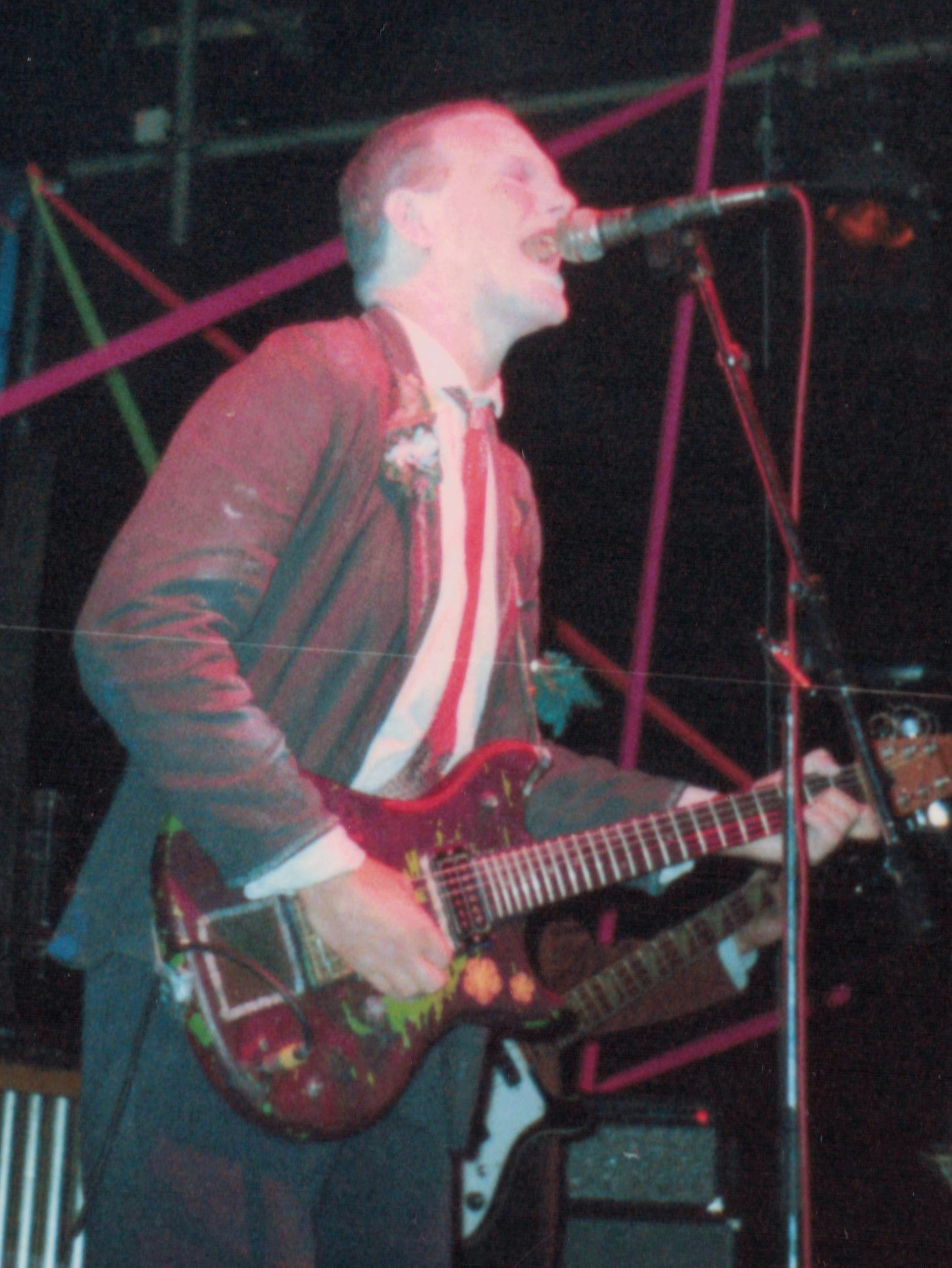
Smith with Cardiacs in 1987

In 1979, Smith helped record a 7", "A Bus for a Bus on the Bus", at Elephant Studios in London. 1980 saw Smith recording the first and only Cardiac Arrest album, The Obvious Identity. Eventually, 1000 cassettes were recorded, but only sold at concerts to save on expenditure. Smith also played keyboards with the band. Smith became the frontman after Pugh and Tagg left the project, and would contribute keyboards in addition to vocals and guitar.

Smith decided to change the name of the band to Cardiacs in 1981. He helped record the band's first album, Toy World, in the same manner as the Cardiac Arrest album – on cassette tape – at a small basement studio known as Crow Studios. After another line up change, Smith recruited Tim Quy (percussion), Sarah Cutts (saxophone) and Dominic Luckman (drums).

=== Studio years, side projects and solo work: 1984–2008 ===
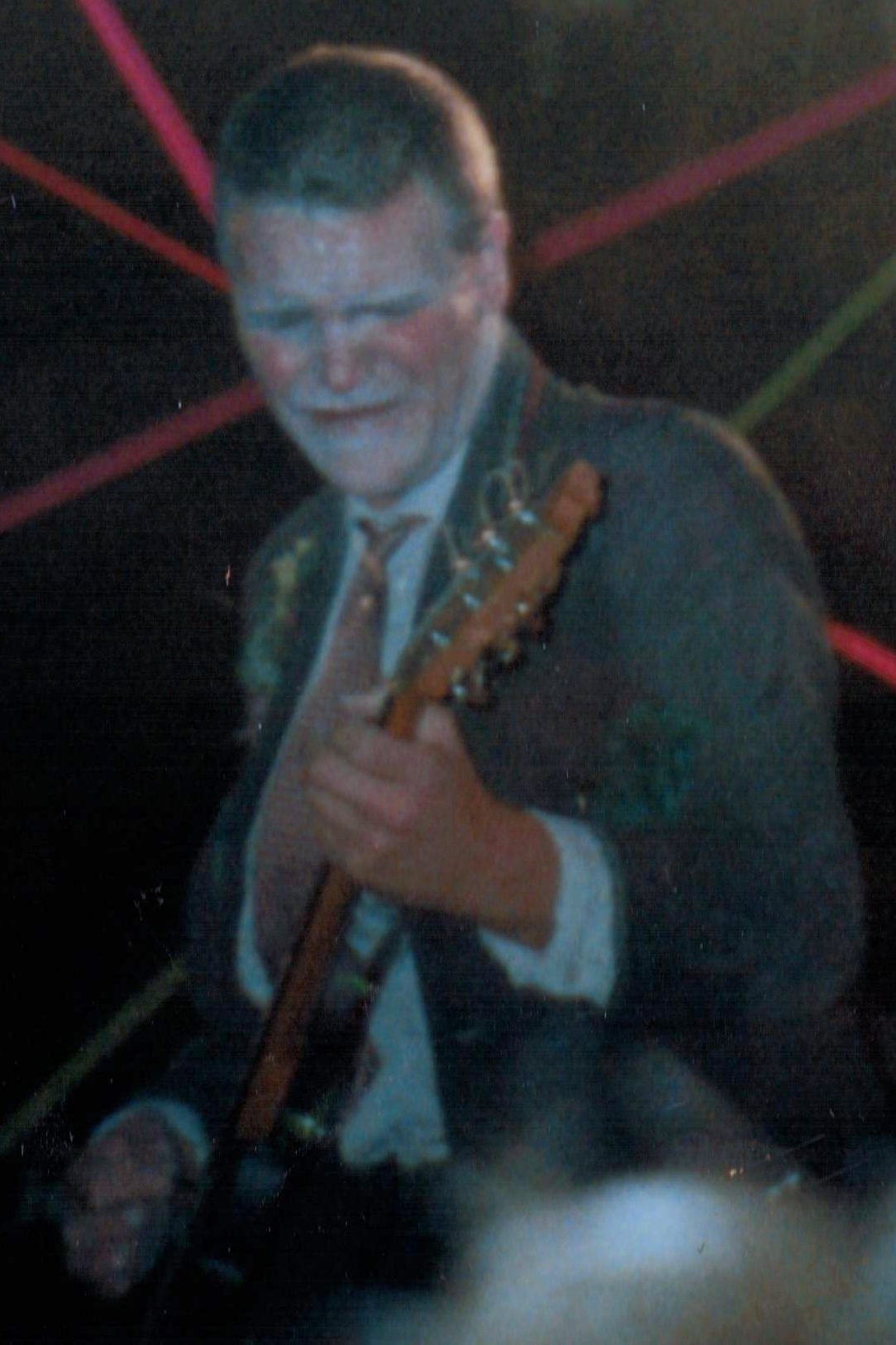
Smith with Cardiacs in 1987

The label Alphabet Business Concern was created in 1984. Smith was asked by vocalist Fish to support his band Marillion on their forthcoming tour near the end of the year. Smith agreed but was not prepared for the hostile audience that awaited them on all legs of the tour (forcing them off the final three days of the tour). From then until 1999, Cardiacs released six studio albums, as well as a number of singles, EPs and live albums. Smith came to the first gig guitarist and multi-instrumentalist Jon Poole did with his band Ad Nauseam, and had Poole join Cardiacs in 1991 shortly after. The pair became very close, contributing to each other's songs and arranging them together, and Smith let Poole have a large input into the band.

During the 1990s, Smith took a break from Cardiacs to work on various other projects. During 1989 and 1991, he wrote songs for a solo album, Tim Smith's Extra Special OceanLandWorld, eventually released in 1995. Smith, his ex-wife Sarah Smith, and William D. Drake were reunited as the Sea Nymphs, a "gentler" version of Cardiacs; they had recorded before in 1984 and released a cassette album, Mr and Mrs Smith and Mr Drake. Smith also performed with Jo Spratley in Spratleys Japs, who released their album Pony in 1999.

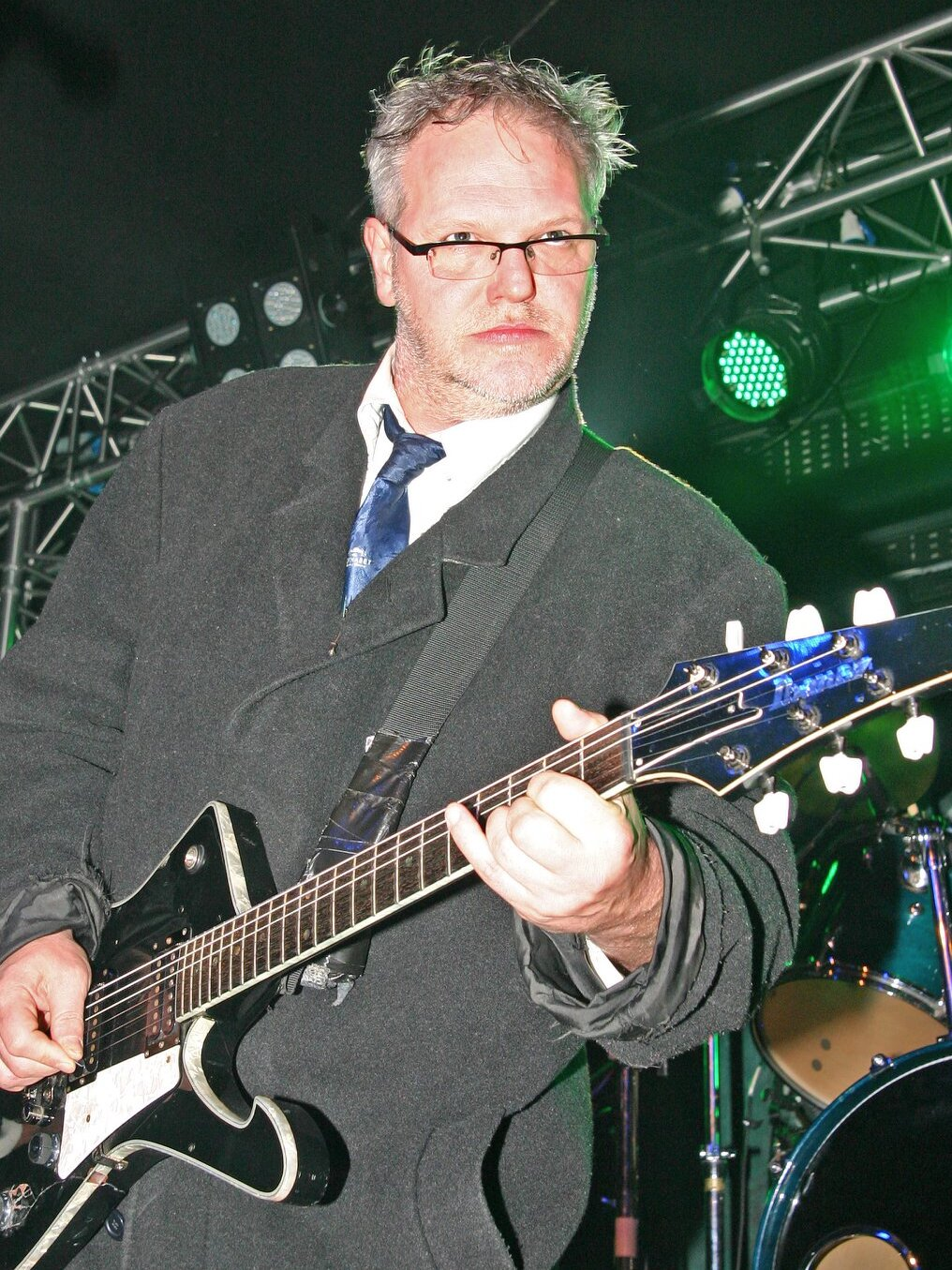
Smith with Cardiacs in 2007

In March 2006, Smith toured with Ginger & The Sonic Circus as their support act, performing acoustic versions of Cardiacs' songs, along with his own material. Cardiacs released their only single of the 2000s, "Ditzy Scene", in 2007. Smith's last musical performance was with Cardiacs in session for Marc Riley's Radio 6 Music programme on 23 June 2008.

== Illness ==
On 25 June 2008, Smith had a heart attack after attending a gig by My Bloody Valentine. Bandmate Kavus Torabi remembers "making up the spare room and going to bed, expecting [Smith] to arrive in a taxi, but he never came."

Smith's heart attack had triggered a major stroke and an episode of cerebral anoxia which was treated in intensive care at University College Hospital. Although there was some initial optimism - according to Craig Fortnam, "he was sat up in bed and smiling", - Smith was thought to have had a second stroke in hospital a few days later while he recuperated. This in turn caused brain damage through hypoxia, which left him paralysed down one side of the body and unable to speak. He was eventually diagnosed with the rare neurological condition dystonia, which causes muscles to contract uncontrollably. In 2011, he remained chronically disabled in a neurological rehabilitation centre in Wiltshire. It became apparent later on that the neurological care centre he was first placed in wasn’t providing all of the treatment it should have been, and was later closed down after a "damning" independent report deemed the home "inadequate".

As an outcome of his injuries and subsequent condition, Smith was denied movement and speech, prompting him to retire from live performances. He had to communicate by picking letters out on a board. Cardiacs went on an indefinite hiatus following his hospitalisation, leaving the LSD album unfinished until 2025.

In 2013, 2015 and 2017, events dubbed The Alphabet Business Convention were held in celebration of and with all proceeds funding Smith (who attended) and his ongoing recovery. Among other things, they featured live music from bands within the Cardiacs' circle.

Knifeworld's 2014 album The Unravelling was Kavus Torabi's love letter to Smith, and an attempt to come to terms with Smith's situation.

In July 2016, a special one-day concert took place in Preston, called The Whole World Window with all the funds going towards helping Smith get better. A cassette and CD album of the same name were also released via Hyena Inc containing performances by the same bands.

In January 2018 an appeal was launched on the crowdfunding website JustGiving with the aim of raising £40,000 to fund Smith's ongoing care. The target amount was exceeded in the first day and a new target of £100,000 was set to provide for a year's care.

On 25 October 2018, Smith received the honorary degree of Doctor of Music from the Royal Conservatoire of Scotland. His brother Jim accepted the honour on his behalf. Notable musicians including JG Thirwell, Craig Fortnam, Mike Vennart, Shane Embury, and Cardiacs' own Kavus Torabi paid tribute following this event.

Further fundraising events were held in 2018 and 2019, featuring live music from Cardiacs members and related bands, film screenings and interviews, with Tim Smith sporadically in attendance.

During his illness, Tim nevertheless was able to supervise production and recording of some of his unfinished musical projects. He made several interviews during this period, and gave messages to fans. The 2020 remaster of A Little Man and a House and the Whole World Window, released in 2023, was Tim Smith's last task before his death.

== Death ==
Smith died on the evening of 21 July 2020 at the age of 59, following another heart attack. His death was announced by his brother and bandmate Jim Smith and bandmate Kavus Torabi. Mike Patton sent "tons of love" to Smith, noting that his musical ethos was conducted "independently and with no apologies", whilst Devin Townsend called him "one of the finest ever". Napalm Death bassist Shane Embury, known for his fast, frantic playing, cited Cardiacs as causing him to write speedier riffs. Other tributes were paid by the Magic Numbers, Chris Catalyst, Dutch Uncles, Steven Wilson, Graham Coxon, Daniel Mongrain, Rob Crow, JG Thirlwell, Mike Vennart, Max Tundra, Pitchshifter, Silvery, Rhodri Marsden, Ginger Wildheart, and Matthew Wright.

== Work as producer and video director ==
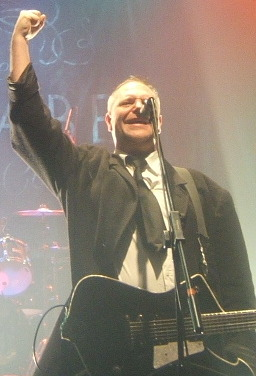
Smith with Cardiacs in 2005

Smith owned and operated his own recording studio Apollo 8 (at various locations, with the final one being near Salisbury, Wiltshire) and had a long list of production credits to his name. Since the early 1990s, Smith produced recordings for a variety of musicians and musical groups, many of whom belong to the so-called "Cardiacs family". These include Levitation, Sidi Bou Said, Eat, The Monsoon Bassoon, Wildhearts frontman Ginger (including his Silver Ginger 5 and Howling Willie Cunt projects), Stars in Battledress, Oceansize, William D. Drake, the Shrubbies, the Scaramanga Six and the Trudy.

Smith created and/or edited pop videos for various bands including Sepultura, Dark Star, Zu and the Frank and Walters, as well as Cardiacs. In 2008, Smith created a film called The Wildhearts Live in the Studio: A Film By Tim Smith, featuring the Wildhearts playing their self-titled album along with surreal interludes.

== Influences and interests ==
Smith was influenced by the corporate image of Devo, the Residents' self-invented record label the Cryptic Corporation, the bizarre theatricality of early Split Enz, and the early short films of David Lynch, particularly The Grandmother. He has declared a fondness for musical acts such as Gentle Giant, Split Enz, Devo, Sparks, Magazine, Queen, Mr. Bungle, Naked City, My Bloody Valentine, Foetus, Pixies, Tom Waits, Blur, Supergrass, Can, the Incredible String Band, the White Noise, Everything Everything as well as the orchestral work of Charles Ives and Ralph Vaughan Williams, and composers like Philip Glass and Steve Reich. He was a "big supporter" of former Ash guitarist Charlotte Hatherley. Smith was also reportedly fascinated with the music of Tom and Jerry cartoons.

"I don’t know what influences [Cardiacs] really, I wouldn’t say that we are influenced by any actual bands in particular, I’ve got no bones about musically ripping someone else’s band off though…. I’ve definitely nicked bits and pieces here and there, I don’t mind if they don’t mind…. I remember working on one song we did a little while ago which was based just on the memory of a song I heard by someone else way back when I was about 14 years old, trouble was that it ended up quite similar to the original, I didn’t care, but the audacity of it raised a few wiggly eyebrows, the actual tune I wrote was totally different and all that… but the atmosphere was very similar, which pleased me as it was that which I was trying to rekindle…. I thought my memory of it had twisted the atmosphere into this new creature, but as it turned out my memory wasn’t that bad… but so what, tunes are for borrowing, you give them all back in the end.

‘Influences’ come more from random or abstract things… like I might walk past a radio playing something nice in somebodies window…. or I’ll hear a ghost in the bushes, or whatever, and I’ll think ‘oooh I’ll do a song like that’ but it’ll twist into something totally different in the end….but I do like DEVO and I think Jim Feotus [sic] and Zappa are genius and Gentle Giant have there moments of total unique brilliance (and moments of embarrassing grimness as well, like anyone unfortunately) but I can’t say that they influence us any more than a crow on a stump does." -Margen Magazine (Spain) April 2001, Tim Smith Interview

== Artistry ==
=== Stage persona ===
Martijn Voorvelt of Perfect Sound Forever noted how Smith's stage persona combined cruelty and cuddliness, being "both bully and cry-baby, dictator and clown"; he called Smith "the Tommy Cooper of rock". Reviewing Some Fairytales from the Rotten Shed, Record Collector's Alun Hamnett noted how Smith's "impish" stage persona didn't seem discouraged by him commanding a shed rather than a stage, and how he berated Bob Leith for neglecting his drumming duties mid-song at one point with a brusque "Twat!"

=== Vocals ===
Andrew Sacher of BrooklynVegan called Smith's voice "genuinely great", noting that it offered a "soaring, tuneful take on the classic British punk sneer". Gil Kaufman of Billboard described Smith's vocals as being anarchic, and his lyrics hard to decipher.

== Personal life ==
Smith married Sarah Cutts on 23 July 1983, who had joined Cardiacs as a multi-instrumentalist in 1980. The pair separated in the early 1990s and the marriage ended in divorce, with Sarah leaving Cardiacs in 1990 to "be a full-time witch and live in the woods with the snails" whilst remaining in the Sea Nymphs. Smith's later partners included Joanne Spratley, Suzy Kirby (at the time of his 2008 cardiac arrest), Sarah Maher and Emily Jones.

== Legacy ==
The word "genius" is used frequently when Smith's admirers speak about his music, with loyal fans also declaring him a 'Mozart' or 'Beethoven' of the rock world. Writer Graham Bendel called Smith a rare talent. Smith and Drake were described by Louder Than War as "arguably the most creative songwriting team of a generation", and the legacy of their music has been compared to the partnership of Lennon and McCartney from the Beatles. A day after the announcement of Smith's death, Sacher noted the ease of drawing parallels between Smith and Brian Wilson of the Beach Boys, another "pop madman" who was likewise the primary songwriter, frontman and producer of his band. Sacher opined, however, that Smith "wasn't just a studio wiz", but also made sure that Cardiacs made masterful, epic albums and put on energetic, cathartic live shows.

== Discography ==
Solo albums

- Tim Smith's Extra Special OceanLandWorld (Alphabet Business Concern, 1995)

== Filmography ==
Year	Title	Role	Notes
1985	Pirates of the Panasoniks	Himself	Music video compilation, segment Little Man and A House
1985	Seaside Treats	Himself	Short film, producer, director
1992	All That Glitters Is a Mare's Nest	Himself	
2015	I Can See A Murder	Himself	Music video for The Scaramanga Six, studio footage
2017	Some Fairytales From the Rotten Shed	Himself	Editor, director
