= Pony (Spratleys Japs album) =

Studio album by Spratleys Japs
- Released: 1999 (Note: Some sources indicate a release year of 1998.)
- Recorded: Autumn–Winter 1998
- Studios: Sparrow Wars (New Forest, England)
- Genres: Psychedelic rock; experimental
- Length: 50:04
- Label: All My Eye and Betty Martin
- Producer: Tim Smith

Singles from Pony
- 1. "Hazel" Released: 1999

Pony is the debut studio album by the English psychedelic rock band Spratleys Japs. Released in 1999 on All My Eye and Betty Martin Music, the album was a side-project of Cardiacs frontman Tim Smith and his then-partner Joanne Spratley.

Although other musicians are credited as playing on the album, it is believed that this was part of an elaborate fictional conceit, and that in fact Smith and Spratley were the only musicians to have been involved with the recording.

== Recording ==
According to the history of the album presented on the All My Eye and Betty Martin website, Pony was conceived as the result of an encounter between Spratley and a displaced American bar band called The Rev-Ups (Heidi Murphy, Mark Donovan and Viv Sheriff), in a dilapidated recording studio in the New Forest. Spratley subsequently introduced Smith to the band, and work began on recording an album in the autumn of 1998.

However, as there is no apparent evidence that the band nor the studio have ever existed, the veracity of this story is in doubt. A further reference was made to the alleged New Forest studio ("Sparrow Wars") on the 2007 album Yoni by Ginger Wildheart which was produced by Tim Smith, where Smith allegedly recorded a church organ for the track "Smile in Denial".

The sound of Pony was apparently inspired by a malfunctioning Mellotron that had been lent to Smith by Mellotron enthusiast Andy Thompson, and the instrument in question features on nearly every track of the album. Sean Kitching of The Quietus has also claimed that "according to Tim, the note for the project that became Spratleys Japs read: 'Record something really quickly, make the drums sound shit.'", while The Organ would claim in 2024 that "Tim once said he was trying to write pop songs [for Spratleys Japs] and to his frustration 'they always came out sounding like all the other shit I do.'..."

== Lyrical references ==
Pony shares a number of reference points with the contemporaneous Cardiacs album Guns, including many lyrics sourced from the famously mis-translated 19th century Portuguese-English phrasebook English as She Is Spoke. For example, the lyric of the song "Oh" is based entirely around text from the "Familiar Dialogues" chapter of the book, incorporating phrases such as "It seems me that the corn does push already", and "The field has by me a thousand charms".

== Label ==
Pony was the first release through Smith's own label All My Eye and Betty Martin Music, and is catalogued as AME CD001. As the album was only distributed by direct mail order it was never sold in any retail outlets, and was historically exceedingly difficult to acquire due to Tim Smith's ill health. However, two tracks, "Cabinet" and "Hazel", were included on the Org Records compilation album, Songs By Cardiacs And Affectionate Friends, released in 2002.

Pony is now once again available to order via the Cardiacs webstore.

== Reviews ==
In a retrospective summary of Tim Smith tracks across various projects, Quietus writer Sean Kitching selected two tracks from Pony. The first, "Vine", was described as "fuzzed up guitars and high, precise vocals arriv[ing] abruptly at a different sonic juncture — the sound of whirring, jangling gears, wheels and tiny spinning rotor blades. It's as if a door has been opened and a room full of automated player pianos burst forth in chorus, belting out the tune's joyous final minute and a half. This bit is like Gentle Giant by way of Philip Glass, performed as ecstatic pagan dance music."

The second, "Hazel" was described as "a stunner, one of only two truly unique takes on ambient music (the other being The Sea Nymphs' 'Lilly White’s Party') in Smith's catalogue... Admittedly, ambient is a little misleading. The piece has ambience alright, but it's an atmosphere that is powerfully sprung upon the listener, fading in swiftly and effortlessly filling what feels like an enormous space with light. Celestial strings twinkle and you can almost hear an implied sound of singing birds and running water, flowers might be ready to spring up at any moment. Yet a touch of something sinister, in the treated vocal that sounds as if it's beaming in from somewhere very far away, prevents the mood from becoming too sickly sweet. A gorgeous and very psychedelic piece of music that manages to imply space on an almost cosmic scale, defining that vastness by emphasising next to it, the fragility of the human voice singing into the void."

== Track listing ==
All tracks are written by Tim Smith.

No.	Title	Length
1.	"Burnt"	0:53
2.	"Vessel"	2:33
3.	"Fanny"	6:23
4.	"Pony"	3:50
5.	"Sparrows"	1:54
6.	"Vine"	2:57
7.	"Oh"	8:09
8.	"Fear"	2:49
9.	"Hazel"	3:00
10.	"Cabinet"	10:59
11.	"Pond"	2:49
12.	"Don't You Ail, Flash the Sea to Steam"	3:48

Notes

- Track 9 is not listed on the back of the CD due to a typographical error.

== Personnel ==
- Joanne Spratley – high voice, lead voice on "Fanny" and "Don't You Ail...", frugal horn [sic]
- Tim Smith – voice, bass, piano, organ
- Heidi Murphy – synthesizers, Mellotron, electronics
- Viv Sheriff – drums, organ on "Fear"
- Mark Donovan – guitars

Orchestra

- Nevergreen Symphonia – orchestral bits
- Wendy Barry – conductor
- Tim Smith – orchestration

Technical

- Tim Smith – producer
- Richard Kilner – mastering
- Andrew Dack – builder (synthesisers)
- Juliette Randall – designer (electronics)
