= Spratleys =

English psychedelic rock band

- Spratleys Japs 1999; From left to right: Joanne Spratley, Tim Smith, Mark Donovan, Heidi Murphy, Viv Sherrif

Background information
- Also known as: Spratleys Japs (Note: Alternative spellings: Spratley's Japs; Spratleys' Japs; Spratley Japs) (1998–2021); Tim Smith's Spratleys Japs (2016–2021); Tim Smith's Spratleys Rats (2021); Tim Smith's Spratleys (Note: stylised Tim Smith's SPRATLEYS since 2023) (since 2021)
- Origin: Hampshire, England
- Genres: Psychedelic rock; experimental
- Years active: 1998–1999; 2016–present
- Labels: All My Eye and Betty Martin; ATE Music
- Spinoff of: Cardiacs; Rev-Ups
- Members: Joanne Spratley; Jesse Cutts; Adrien Rodes; Étienne Rodes; Benjamin Reed
- Past members: Tim Smith; Heidi Murphy; Mark Donovan; Viv Sherriff; Damo Waters; Stephen Gilchrist

Spratleys (also known as Tim Smith's Spratleys) are an English psychedelic rock band originally formed by Cardiacs leader Tim Smith and Joanne Spratley in 1998 as Spratleys Japs.

== History ==
=== Original line-up and Pony album (1998–1999) ===
Spratleys Japs emerged during a lull in Cardiacs activities during which Tim Smith wanted to try something new. The band's original line-up was Smith (vocals, bass guitar, Mellotron) and Joanne Spratley (vocals, flugelhorn, Theremin), plus Heidi Murphy (electronic devices and synthesisers), Mark Donovan (guitar) and Viv Sherriff (drums). Murphy, Donovan and Sherriff had allegedly been members of an American rock band called the Rev-Ups, which had initially formed near Mexico but had subsequently moved to the New Forest area of England. (Since neither the original Spratleys Japs band nor the Rev-Ups have ever been recorded as having played live, it has been suggested that the Rev-Ups personnel were fictional and that all sounds were in fact created by Smith and Spratley.)

The band project was known to have been inspired by the sound of a malfunctioning Mellotron loaned to Tim Smith by Planet Mellotron coordinator Andy Thompson. The Mellotron was used extensively on the original Spratleys Japs recordings. (It has since been repaired). Sean Kitching of The Quietus has also claimed that "according to Tim, the note for the project that became Spratleys Japs read: 'Record something really quickly, make the drums sound shit.'", while The Organ would claim in 2024 that "Tim once said he was trying to write pop songs [for Spratleys Japs] and to his frustration 'they always came out sounding like all the other shit I do.'..."

In 1999, Spratleys Japs released one album — Pony — and one single, "Hazel". Both of these recordings were released on Smith's own short-lived All My Eye and Betty Martin Music label, with Pony selling several hundred copies. This version of the band never performed its material live, and soon lapsed into inactivity.

Although the band never formally split up, there was no further Spratley's Japs work for the next seventeen years. Joanne Spratley went on to work with Christian Hayes' project Mikrokosmos, while Smith returned to Cardiacs activity. Meanwhile, the Spratleys Japs recordings became popular with Cardiacs fans, despite being unavailable for many years. In 2008, Smith suffered a debilitating heart attack and stroke which left him unable to work and perform, causing all of his current and paused projects (including Spratleys Japs) to come to a halt.

=== Revival, live concerts and new material (2016–2019) ===
In 2016 Joanne Spratley's son Jesse Cutts suggested they should form a band together. In autumn that year she organized a Spratleys Japs concert in Brighton. It took place on 19 November and was billed as "Spratleys Japs Performed Live". Although Tim Smith was still physically incapacitated and could not perform as a live band member, he attended as an audience member. The performing band featured Spratley and Cutts plus musicians drawn from various Brighton bands including Clowwns, Crayola Lectern, Muddy Suzuki and Heavy Lamb.

The concert led in turn to a full revival of Spratleys Japs featuring the new lineup, which included — alongside Spratley on vocals/percussion and Cutts on bass guitar — Adrien Rodes (keyboards), Étienne Rodes (guitars), and Damo Waters (drums). They did assorted concerts in England during 2017, including a small tour. Billing themselves as "Tim Smith's Spratleys Japs", they made their live London debut at the Lexington music pub in a double-header with Guapo: Kavus Torabi made a cameo appearance for their encore, joining the band for a cover of Cardiacs' "Flap off You Beak".

Attending the Lexington gig, Paul Lester of Prog hailed the band's "maverick spirit" and "curious thrashy vignettes [which] locate the weirdness at the centre of post-war English genteel society and culture... File under barmy but affecting." Lester also noted the band's multiple musical ingredients ("prog punk... classical, psych and prog... galumphing strangeness") and the way in which the song "Burnt" "violently transitions from hippie to rhythmic post-punk, goes back to psych, fits in a Mothers of Invention snark chorale, then repeats", as well as commenting that "[Joanne] Spratley sings like a Victorian girl trapped in an attic – her distracted, plummy English tones are a signature component of this mad miscellany."

On 18 December 2018, the single "Her/Hands" was released, featuring two tracks written collectively by the current band and with Tim Smith credited as "executive musical producer". This was followed by a Christmas gig at the Garage club in London to celebrate an Honorary Degree as Doctor of Music from the Royal Conservatoire of Scotland which Smith had received in October. Reviewing the concert, Roger Trenwith of The Progressive Aspect commented that it "gave my quirk button a gentle nudge", drawing attention to the "fabulously angular but direct" songs "Klog" and "Cabinet" and observing that "Jo Spratley has a beguiling stage presence, moving around like a marionette set free, messing up her hair and casting cryptic glances at the thronging melee in front of her."

In January 2019, Tim Smith's Spratleys Japs performed an almost full performance of Pony, although Spratley was suffering from a throat infection. On 4 February 2019, the band had a session with Marc Riley. On 17 May 2019, they supported Gong at Oslo (Hackney) and revealed plans to release a new album by the end of the year. A further concert was played at The Green Door Store in Brighton on 21 December 2019.

Three live tracks from the 2019 Brighton concert ("Hands", the as-yet-unreleased-on-record "Pandy" and a cover of Cardiacs' "Is This the Life") were released via Bandcamp on the CONFINEMENT/release6 EP on 3 July 2020, as part of a series of Covid lockdown releases featuring bands connected to Joanne Spratley and Christian Hayes. During the same month, Tim Smith died following a second heart attack.

=== Further activity and name changes (2021–2025) ===
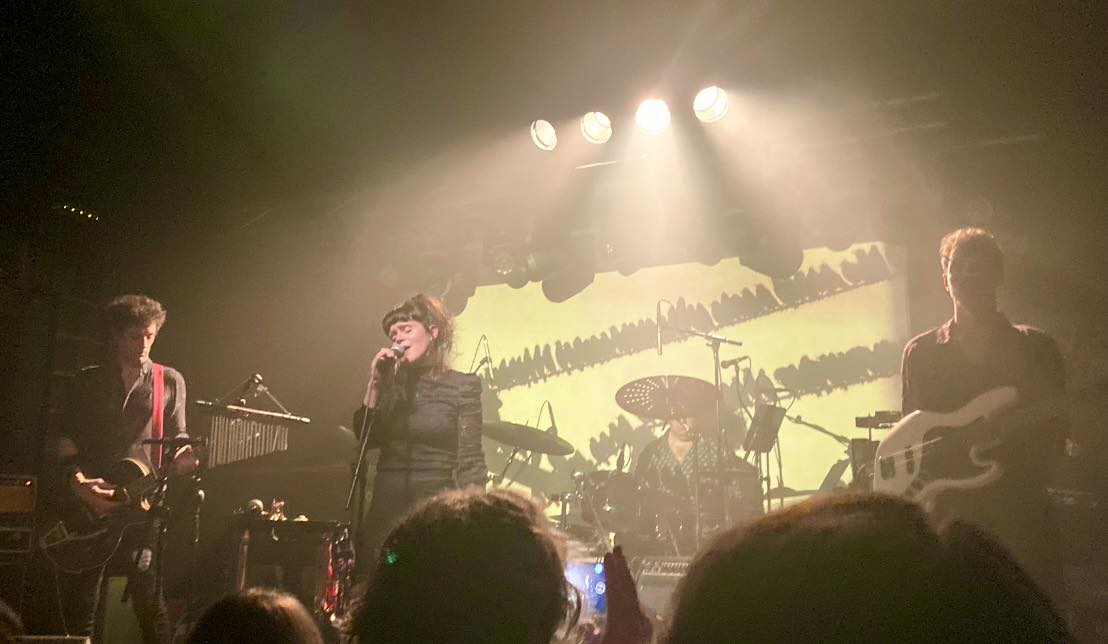
Spratleys perform at Cardiacs & Friends: Sing to Tim, an event at The Garage, London, 4 May 2024

Despite their previous plans, Spratleys Japs' second album was delayed, and there was no further public activity for a couple of years.

On 5 June 2021 Joanne Spratley announced on Facebook that the band would be changing its name to Tim Smith's Spratleys Rats after confronting the potentially offensive nature of the term "Japs". In fact, the name had innocent origins and had been taken from antique British confectionery (cube-shaped fruit and cocoa flavour coconut sweets), with Joanne Spratley explaining, "when we named the band we thought [japs] sounded like some sweets that you got in a paper bag when you was a kid weighed out by the man behind the counter from one of them big dusty jars." "Spratleys Rats" was a suggestion from Marina Organ. Tim Smith's name was appended to the group name as a posthumous commemoration and as an acknowledgement of his vital contributions as original instigator, composer and performer.

With Stephen Gilchrist replacing Damo Waters on drums, the band resurfaced in May 2024 to play a series of "Sing for Tim" gigs in London and Leeds in honour of Tim Smith, alongside The Smith & Drake Ensemble, Crayola Lectern and Cardiacs & Friends (the last being a line-up of various ex-Cardiacs and related musicians playing a headlining set of Cardiacs songs). For these gigs (and going forward), the band changed their name to Spratleys.

Reviewing Spratleys at the first London gig, The Organ stated "there's a lot of emotion up there, there's joy, there's tears, there's drums, tambourines and ribbons and a beautiful sway, these songs always had a beautiful sway, a flow, a majestic rhythm, a kind of pushing throb, they are different, still with that same wonderful essence though and they are being performed rather well to a very very attentive joyous crowd tonight, of course they are. I wasn't going to start picking out songs this evening but the performance of "Oh" does deserve particular mention, that really was quietly beautiful, it was a rather brave performance, fragile, raw, extra special on a special night."

Further shows were planned for autumn 2024, which were then delayed to 2025 and then again September 2026 in the wake of Cardiacs' resumption in activity and touring around their album LSD.

=== Second album, Bloom (2026) ===
The first single, "Koiptics", from Spratleys' second album Bloom was revealed March 10, 2026, with Bloom announced to be releasing in April 2026. Organ reviewed "Koipics" and praised both the song and its connection to Cardiacs, describing it as "a first almost fragile taste of something blooming and splendid, a first taste and a sparkling new offering... this is where the spirit is now, this is where the magic can be found, this is where hearts swell... I do so like the way Spratleys are evolving in such a fine fine way, in just the right way." In May 2026, it was announced that future Spratleys material would be released on the independent ATE Music label alongside the related Hayes-and/or-Spratley projects M U M M Y, Panixphere, ZOFFF, Mikrokosmos, Dark Star and Levitation.

Following some delays, Bloom was released on June 21, 2026. It featured contributions from several Cardiacs members and re-recordings of "Her" and "Hands". Concerts were scheduled for September 2026.

Reviewing Bloom in Organ, Sean Worrall praised it as being "a very (very) beautiful very deep album. Every moment of Bloom is wonderful, every note beautiful, everything so beautifully rich, songs and tunes alive with hope and the glorious stench of everything that is life. Songs that sound like they’ve come from a musical box, songs that are sometimes plant-like and delicate (never fragile though, this is delicately strong), songs that sometimes lash like a vicious horse's tail (or maybe a tale, tales, tails..), musical tales that gallop with insect hooves and as their bright colours reach for the sky, it a thing that glitters so so radiantly. Sometimes art deco flavoured, songs sometimes plays in the shadows, tunes and words that twirl and dance, songs that dances with such elegance... it does indeed bloom, it bursts with growth, with leaves and lights and things that shine and pull you in... Bloom is all we had hoped for and more.. and I don’t really want to have to stand here finding words and try to writing about it. I just want to bask in the glow of it all, the essence of it all, I just want to play it. And I do keep hearing my favourite bit and then I hear another bit and that’s my new favourite bit, not that this is in bits, these are deliciously full bodied songs and all of them glorious devils (the devil in the detail?)...Tim Smith always insisted that this was something very special, that it was about far more than just him, I’m pretty sure that wherever he is, he is very proud of what has bloomed and blossomed here."

== Members ==
Original line-up

- Joanne Spratley – vocals, flugelhorn, theremin
- Tim Smith – bass guitar, vocals, keyboards
- Heidy Murphy – electronic devices, keyboards, synthesizers
- Mark Donovan – guitar
- Viv Sherriff – drums

Current band

- Joanne Spratley – vocals, percussion
- Jesse Cutts – bass guitar
- Adrien Rodes – keyboards
- Étienne Rodes – guitars
- Benjamin Reed – drums

Former:

- Damo Waters – drums (2016–2019)
- Stephen Gilchrist – drums (2024)

== Discography ==
=== Albums ===
- Pony (1999)
- Bloom (2026)

=== Singles and EPs ===
- Hazel EP (1999), AME CD002
- "Odd Even" (2017)
- Her/Hands 7" (2018)
- Confinement/release6 (2020)
- "Koiptics" (2026)
