= The People's Choice (album) =

Greatest hits album by NoMeansNo
- Released: April 20, 2004
- Recorded: 1985–98
- Genre: Punk rock, punk jazz
- Length: 73:56
- Label: AntAcidAudio
- Producer: Nomeansno

Nomeansno compilation chronology
Mr. Right & Mr. Wrong: One Down & Two to Go (1994)	The People's Choice (2004)	0 + 2 = 1 ½ (2010)

Professional ratings
Review scores
Source	Rating
AllMusic	4.5/5 stars

The People's Choice is a greatest hits album by Nomeansno. It collects tracks from 1985 to 1998.

== Track listing ==
1. "Now" (from 0 + 2 = 1, 1991) – 5:09
2. "Sex Mad" (from Sex Mad, 1986) – 4:13
3. "Theresa, Give Me That Knife" (from Small Parts Isolated and Destroyed, 1988) – 2:13
4. "Body Bag" (from You Kill Me, 1985) – 4:38
5. "Angel or Devil" (from The Worldhood of the World (As Such), 1995) – 3:42
6. "Rags 'n Bones" (from Wrong, 1989) – 5:07
7. "I Need You" (from Why Do They Call Me Mr. Happy?, 1993) – 7:01
8. "It's Catching Up" (from Wrong) – 3:29
9. "Humans" (from The Worldhood of the World (As Such)) – 4:11
10. "I Can't Stop Talking" (from Dance of the Headless Bourgeoisie, 1998) – 5:29
11. "The Day Everything Became Nothing (Live)" (from Live + Cuddly, 1991) – 4:47
12. "Dad" (from Sex Mad) – 3:00
13. "The River" (Live) (from In the Fishtank 1, 1996) – 6:19
14. "Victory" (from Small Parts Isolated and Destroyed) – 7:55
15. "Give Me the Push" (from Dance of the Headless Bourgeoisie) – 6:37

== Personnel ==
Nomeansno

- John Wright – vocals, drums, keyboards (all tracks)
- Rob Wright – vocals, bass, guitar (all tracks)
- Andy Kerr – vocals, guitar, bass (tracks 1–4, 6, 8, 11–12, 14)
- Tom Holliston – vocals, guitar (tracks 5, 9–10, 13, 15)
- Ken Kempster – drums (tracks 5, 9, 13)

Production

- Marc L'Esperance – mastering
