= Would We Be Alive? =

EP by Nomeansno
- Released: 1996
- Recorded: 1995
- Genre: Post-hardcore, punk rock
- Length: 20:47
- Label: Alternative Tentacles
- Producer: Nomeansno

Nomeansno singles and EPs chronology
Oh Canaduh (1992)	Would We Be Alive? (1996)	In the Fishtank 1 (1996)

Would We Be Alive? is an EP by Vancouver punk rock band Nomeansno. Its title track is a cover of a song by the avant-garde group The Residents, from their Intermission: Extraneous Music from the Residents' Mole Show record. The EP also features a new version of the song "Big Dick" from the Nomeansno album Wrong, as well as two new tracks.

== Background and recording ==
Nomeansno became a four-piece band in 1993, when founding members Rob and John Wright were joined by guitarist Tom Holliston and second drummer Ken Kempster. Their first recording with this lineup was the 1995 album The Worldhood of the World (As Such), and the Would We Be Alive? EP their second.

Nomeansno had frequently cited The Residents as one of their favorite bands, and recorded a cover version of a song from the Residents' arcane Intermission: Extraneous Music from the Residents' Mole Show five-song EP from 1982. They also recorded two new songs and a reworked version of the song "Big Dick" from their 1989 album Wrong. The sessions were recorded at Sea of Shit Studios in Victoria and were mixed in Greehouse Studios by Nomeansno and Brian Else.

== Release ==
Would We Be Alive? was initially released in 1996 as a two-song 12" single on Alternative Tentacles for the band's European tour. Its title track was on side A and the new song "Rise" on side B. The record's cover featured drummer John Wright holding his newborn son. These tracks were also issued later that year as Chaotic Soup, a Japanese split release with the Alternative Tentacles band Ultra Bidé.

In November 1997, the EP was issued in four-track form on CD and 12" vinyl by Alternative Tentacles. It is out of print and has not been reissued by the band's own label Wrong Records, unlike much of their back catalogue.

== Reception ==
Professional ratings
Review scores
Source	Rating
AllMusic	2/5 stars

The EP received only lukewarm reviews. AllMusic critic Steve Huey awarded the EP two out of five stars and described it as relevant to established fans only. A critic writing for The A.V. Club praised the title track as a "tooth-rattling march into self-destruction," but assessed the other tracks as "fine filler" which "would not stand on their own."

== Track listing ==
All tracks by Nomeansno, except track 1 by The Residents.

1. Would We Be Alive? – 6:00
2. You Are Not One – 3:53
3. Rise – 5:40
4. Big Dick (alternate version) – 5:13

Note

- The original 1996 12" vinyl tour edition included tracks 1 and 3 only. The 1997 12" and CD issue included all four tracks.

== Personnel ==
Nomeansno

- John Wright – drums, vocals, keyboards
- Rob Wright – bass, vocals
- Tom Holliston – guitar, vocals
- Ken Kempster – drums

Production and design

- Brian Else – mixing
- Randy Iwata – layout
- Marlise McKee – photo
- Zygote – artwork
