= 0 + 2 = 1 =

Studio album by Nomeansno
- Released: November 4, 1991
- Recorded: July 1991
- Studios: Profile Sound, Vancouver, British Columbia, Canada
- Genre: Post-hardcore
- Length: 47:01
- Label: Alternative Tentacles
- Producers: Cecil English, Nomeansno

Nomeansno chronology
The Sky Is Falling and I Want My Mommy (1991)	0 + 2 = 1 (1991)	Why Do They Call Me Mr. Happy? (1993)

0 + 2 = 1 is the fifth full-length album by Canadian punk band Nomeansno. Released in 1991, it was the fourth and final studio album to feature Nomeansno's longtime guitarist Andy Kerr. The proper follow-up to their most popular album, Wrong, the record was somewhat polarizing but generally well received by critics.

== Background and recording ==
By 1991, the members of Nomeansno had quit their day jobs and focused on their band, which was developing an increasingly large audience in Europe and North America. They had finished supporting their most widely acclaimed record, Wrong, the promotional tour for which yielded the live album Live + Cuddly. They recorded The Sky Is Falling and I Want My Mommy collaboratively with former Dead Kennedys vocalist Jello Biafra earlier in the year before beginning work on the proper follow-up to Wrong.

In July, the band returned to Profile Sound Studios to record with Cecil English. They tracked 19 songs during the sessions, 11 of which appeared on the final record. The songs included a mix of hardcore punk, progressive rock, and experimentation, as well as "straightforward swinging grooves" as in the opening song "Now."

All eight of the outtakes were eventually released. Two tracks, covers of The Subhumans's "Oh Canaduh" and D.O.A.'s "New Age," were issued as a 7-inch record on Allied Recordings later that year. Another, a cover of the track "Forward to Death," was included on the Dead Kennedys tribute album Virus 100. The remaining five outtakes were packaged with four demos and released as the 0 + 2 = 1 ½ compilation in 2010. Each of these five outtakes appeared on subsequent Nomeansno releases: "Cats, Sex, and Nazis" and "I Need You" on Why Do They Call Me Mr. Happy? (1993), "Blinding Light" and "This Wound Will Never Heal" on Mr. Right & Mr. Wrong: One Down & Two to Go (1994), and "Lost" on The Worldhood of the World (As Such) (1995).

== Release ==
The album was issued on CD, LP, and cassette by Alternative Tentacles in 1991. To support it, the band toured extensively in North America and Europe. Guitarist Andy Kerr left the band after the tour to emigrate to the Netherlands, and the band returned to its original two-piece formation of brothers Rob and John Wright.

Nomeansno bought the rights to their back catalogue from Alternative Tentacles in 2002, and reissued 0 + 2 = 1 on CD and double LP in 2007.

== Reception ==
Professional ratings
Review scores
Source	Rating
AllMusic	3/5 stars
Ox-Fanzine	9/10

The album was received fairly well by critics. Writing for Ox-Fanzine, Joachim Hiller argued that the record helped to solidify the band's "godlike status" through "complex rhythms, harrowing chants, and unorthodox guitar work." In a retrospective review, AllMusic critic Adam Bregman assessed the album as "among their most far-out records" and worried that "[t]he songs here are incredibly long and somewhat repetitive." Nonetheless, Bregman concluded that the album "has a lot of great moments stretched out over a record that's way too long" and awarded it three out of five stars.

== Track listing ==
All tracks are written by Nomeansno.

No.	Title	Length
1.	"Now"	5:08
2.	"The Fall"	5:28
3.	"0 + 2 = 1"	4:46
4.	"The Valley of the Blind"	2:52
5.	"Mary"	6:04
6.	"Everyday I Start to Ooze"	4:32
7.	"When Putting It All in Order Ain't Enough"	2:51
8.	"The Night Nothing Became Everything"	1:25
9.	"I Think You Know"	1:58
10.	"Ghosts"	7:55
11.	"Joyful Reunion"	3:56

== Personnel ==
=== Nomeansno ===
- Andy Kerr (" ") – guitar, bass, vocals
- John Wright (Mr. Right) – vocals, drums, keyboards, percussion, engineering, horns (track 2)
- Rob Wright (Mr. Wrong) – vocals, bass, guitar

=== Additional musicians ===
- Mark Critchley – horns (track 2)
- Lissa Beurge – backup vocals (track 6)

=== Production and artwork ===
- David Bruce – artwork
- Brian (Who) Else – engineering
- Cecil English – producer, engineering
- George Horn – mastering
