= Why Do They Call Me Mr. Happy? =

Studio album by Nomeansno
- Released: May 21, 1993
- Recorded: 1993
- Genre: Punk rock
- Length: 58:56
- Label: Alternative Tentacles
- Producer: Nomeansno

Nomeansno chronology
| 0 + 2 = 1 (1991) | Why Do They Call Me Mr. Happy? (1993) | The Worldhood of the World (As Such) (1995) |

Why Do They Call Me Mr. Happy? is the sixth full-length album by Vancouver punk rock group Nomeansno. Released in 1993, it is their second album recorded by the original two-piece lineup of brothers Rob and John Wright following Mama (1982), and first after the departure of longtime guitarist Andy Kerr. Here the band mostly replaced its hardcore punk sound with slower songs influenced by heavy metal and progressive rock. The album was well received by critics and praised for its balance of heaviness and subtlety, showcasing the dynamics of the band in its original incarnation.

== Background and recording ==
Brothers Rob and John Wright formed Nomeansno in 1979 as a two-piece, first making home recordings and then rehearsing as a bass-and-drums duo. Their self-released 1982 debut album, Mama, features material written and performed in this incarnation. In 1983, guitarist Andy Kerr joined, and the band proceeded to sign to Alternative Tentacles records and issue four albums and several EPs. Kerr departed the band after touring late in 1991 and emigrated to the Netherlands. The Wright brothers then turned their focus towards The Hanson Brothers, their Ramones-influenced side project, while Rob also began working on solo material under the name Mr. Wrong.

In February 1993, the brothers began working on material for a sixth Nomeansno album. Rob Wright, the band's bass player, also played the guitar parts during the recording sessions. Demo tracks for the album were recorded at Dollhouse Studio. The final versions were recorded at Cecil English's Profile Sound Studios. The record was engineered by Brian Else, produced by Nomeansno, and mixed by Else, Nomeansno, and longtime roadie Craig Bougie. The band experimented in the studio; the final track, "Cats, Sex, and Nazis", features audio samples of Faith No More's "We Care a Lot", songs by The Residents and Deep Purple, and a previously released Nomeansno song, "I Am Wrong".

Three of the ten songs included on the final album were originally written during Kerr's tenure: "I Need You," "Cats, Sex, and Nazis," and "Happy Bridge." The former two of these songs had originally been recorded with Kerr as outtakes from the sessions for their previous album, 0 + 2 = 1, while the latter was initially recorded as a demo. The versions with Kerr were later released on the 0 + 2 = 1 ½ retrospective compilation. Of the seven other tracks on Why Do They Call Me Mr. Happy?, four ("The Land of the Living," "The River," "Machine," and "Lullaby") were taken from the Mr. Wrong set and the remainder were new compositions. Four outtakes from these recording sessions were later issued on the compilation album Mr. Right & Mr. Wrong: One Down & Two to Go.

== Release ==
Alternative Tentacles issued the album in 1993 as a ten-track CD and seven-track LP. For the supporting tour, the Wright brothers expanded Nomeansno to include guitarist Tom Holliston and second drummer Ken Kempster, both members of the Hanson Brothers. Holliston would remain with the band until their 2016 breakup. He later called Why Do They Call Me Mr. Happy? his favorite Nomeansno record.

The album fell out of print when Nomeansno bought the rights to their back catalogue from Alternative Tentacles. Although they have reissued many of their records on their own Wrong Records imprint, Why Do They Call Me Mr. Happy? has not been reissued.

== Reception ==
Professional ratings
Review scores
| Source | Rating |
|---|---|
| AllMusic | 4.5/5 stars |
| Rock Hard | 7.5/10 |

Why Do They Call Me Mr. Happy? was well received by critics and became a fan favorite. Writing for The Guardian, critic John Doran called it "the high watermark of western civilization" in a 2016 retrospective review. AllMusic critic Ned Raggett praised the album for hitting "amazing rock epic heights" having "sheer lift and charge." Raggett furthermore praised the album's simultaneous power and subtlety and awarded the record 4.5 out of 5 stars. Writing for Rock Hard magazine, critic Jan Jaedike called the album a challenging listen due to its heaviness and repetition, but ultimately assessed it as rewarding. Jaedike gave the album 7.5 out of 10 stars.

== Track listing ==
All songs written by Nomeansno, except 5, 7, and 10 written by Nomeansno and Andy Kerr.

1. "The Land of the Living" – 5:09
2. "The River" – 6:19
3. "Machine" – 7:48
4. "Madness and Death" – 4:46
5. "Happy Bridge" – 1:23
6. "Kill Everyone Now" – 8:06
7. "I Need You" – 7:03
8. "Slowly Melting" – 6:46
9. "Lullaby" – 3:39
10. "Cats, Sex and Nazis" – 7:51

Note: the above track listing is that of the CD issue (1993, Alternative Tentacles). The LP issue (1993, Alternative Tentacles) includes tracks 1 through 6 and 10 only.

== Personnel ==
Nomeansno

- John Wright (Mr. Right) – vocals, drums, keyboards, horns (track 10)
- Rob Wright (Mr. Wrong) – vocals, bass, guitar

Additional musicians

- Mark Critchley – horns (track 10)

Production and artwork

- Craig Bougie – mixing
- Brian (Who) Else – engineering, mixing
- George Horn – mastering
- Prod Nattrass – sequencing
- John Yates – artwork
