= In the Fishtank 1 =

EP by Nomeansno
- Released: 1996
- Recorded: 1996
- Genres: Post-hardcore, punk rock
- Length: 25:32
- Labels: Atomic Recordings, Konkurrent
- Producer: Nomeansno

Nomeansno singles and EPs chronology
Would We Be Alive? (1996)	In the Fishtank 1 (1996)	Generic Shame (2001)

In the Fishtank chronology
In the Fishtank 1 (1996)	In the Fishtank 2 (1997)

In the Fishtank 1 is an EP by Vancouver punk rock band Nomeansno. Recording during the band's 1996 European tour, it was the first release in the In the Fishtank series, in which the Netherlands-based De Konkurrent label provided bands with two days of studio recording time and released the final results.

In the Fishtank 1 has been issued with five different covers and contains new versions of previously released songs recorded live in the studio with the band's short-lived four-piece incarnation, including second drummer Ken Kempster.

== Background and recording ==
Nomeansno became a four-piece band in 1993, when founding members Rob and John Wright were joined by guitarist Tom Holliston and second drummer Ken Kempster. Their first recording with this lineup was the 1995 album The Worldhood of the World (As Such). In 1996, they embarked on a European tour, supported by the tour-only 12" single release Would We Be Alive? (which was later released worldwide as an EP).

In the Netherlands, the De Konkurrent label asked Nomeansno to record the first volume of the In the Fishtank recording series. Over the next decade, the series would ultimately yield 15 volumes. Pitchfork critic Joe Tangari later described De Konkurrent's intention in issuing the releases: "The idea is simple. Grab one or two bands as they tour through the Netherlands, put them in the studio for a couple of days together, give them the run of the place, and release the results on an EP."

Given two days in the recording studio, Nomeansno recorded five songs, all previously released. "Would We Be Alive?", their cover of a song by The Residents, was the first. They also re-recorded "Big Dick" from Wrong (1989), "The River" from Why Do They Call Me Mr. Happy? (1993), "Joy" from The Worldhood of the World (As Such) (1995), and the then-unreleased outtake "You Are Not One." An earlier studio version of the latter track was included on the four-song version of the Would We Be Alive? EP released the following year.

== Release ==
In the Fishtank 1 was first released on 12" vinyl by Atomic Recordings in 1996, and was issued by De Konkurrent on vinyl and CD later that year. A CD version was released in the United States in 1999. De Konkurrent also reissued the record in 2014. Five editions of In the Fishtank 1 have been released in total, each with different cover art. The EP version of "The River" was later included on Nomeansno's retrospective album The People's Choice.

== Reception ==
Professional ratings
Review scores
Source	Rating
The Georgia Straight	(positive)

Reviewing the 2014 reissue of the EP for The Georgia Straight, critic Allan MacInnis called the record "an inspired and welcome departure" from the band's reissue series. He further praised the version of "The River" as the definitive recording of the band's best song, but assessed the songs on side two as "lesser material."

== Track listing ==
All songs by Nomeansno, except track 1 by The Residents.

1. "Would We Be Alive?" – 5:55
2. "The River" – 5:35
3. "Joy" – 5:18
4. "You Are Not One" – 4:05
5. "Big Dick" – 4:39

== Personnel ==
Nomeansno

- John Wright – drums, vocals, keyboards
- Rob Wright – bass, vocals
- Tom Holliston – guitar, vocals
- Ken Kempster – drums
- Craig Bougie – live sound, studio effects

Production and design

- Isabelle Vigier – design
- Maarten de Boer – mastering
- Dolf – mixing
