= Sex Mad/You Kill Me =

Compilation album by Nomeansno
- Released: 1986
- Recorded: 1984, 1985
- Genre: Punk rock
- Length: 68:47 (CD)
- Label: Alternative Tentacles, Cargo Records

Nomeansno compilation chronology
The Day Everything Became Isolated and Destroyed (1988)	Sex Mad/You Kill Me (1986)	Mr. Right & Mr. Wrong: One Down & Two to Go (1994)

Sex Mad/You Kill Me is a compilation of two records by Canadian punk rock band Nomeansno. Released in 1991 on the Alternative Tentacles imprint domestically and Cargo Records internationally, the album compiles the You Kill Me EP from 1985 and the Sex Mad album from 1986. These two records were the band's first recordings with longtime guitarist Andy Kerr.

== Background and release ==
Brothers Rob and John Wright formed Nomeansno as a two-piece band in 1979, initially making home recordings and then performing live as a duo. Guitarist Andy Kerr joined in 1983, and the band became a fixture of the British Columbia punk scene before embarking on extensive North American touring.

Their first release as a three-piece band was the You Kill Me EP on Undergrowth Records. This was followed thereafter by the Sex Mad album, issued initially on Psyche Industry Records. The band attracted the attention of Alternative Tentacles, who signed them and issued Sex Mad on LP in the United States and Europe. In 1991, Alternative Tentacles released both records on compact disc together as the Sex Mad/You Kill Me compilation album, with international distribution from Cargo Records. The new edition was remixed by long-time Nomeansno producer Cecil English in Profile Studios in Vancouver.

In 2002, Nomeansno bought the rights to their back catalogue, reissuing their albums on their own Wrong Records imprint with distribution from Southern Records. Neither Sex Mad nor You Kill Me, however, has been reissued during this process.

== Reception ==
Professional ratings
Review scores
Source	Rating
AllMusic	4/5 stars

As a single disc showcasing the musical prowess of the burgeoning trio, the compilation was received well by critics. Writing for AllMusic, Ned Raggett writes that "Sex Mad/You Kill Me makes for an edgy, thrashing release that shows the Canadians fully in charge of a frenetic post-punk style seemingly left for dead by many in the late '80s." Raggett awards the disc four out of five stars.

== Track listing ==
All tracks written by Nomeansno, except 16 written by Jimi Hendrix

1. "Sex Mad" – 4:15
2. "Dad" – 3:01
3. "Obsessed" – 3:36
4. "No Fgnuikc" – 0:31
5. "Love Thang" – 4:12
6. "Dead Bob" – 6:02
7. "Self Pity" – 7:31
8. "Long Days" – 4:58
9. "Metronome" – 6:19
10. "Revenge" – 5:21
11. "No Fkuicgn" – 0:31
12. "Hunt The She Beast" – 5:33
13. "Body Bag" – 4:39
14. "Stop It" – 4:36
15. "Some Bodies" – 4:04
16. "Manic Depression" – 2:32
17. "Paradise" – 3:50
- Tracks 1–10 from original United States edition of Sex Mad (including 4 and 5, omitted from Canadian and European pressing)
- Tracks 11–12 from original Canadian and European editions of Sex Mad
- Tracks 13–17 from You Kill Me EP

== Personnel ==
Nomeansno

- Rob Wright – vocals, bass, guitar
- Andy Kerr – vocals, guitar, bass
- John Wright – vocals, drums, keyboards, engineer (tracks 1 to 12)

Production

- Craig Bougie – engineer (tracks 1 to 12)
- Greg Reely – producer, engineer (tracks 13 to 17)
- Cecil English – remix
