= The Day Everything Became Isolated and Destroyed =

Compilation album by NoMeansNo
- Released: 1988
- Recorded: December 1987
- Studio: Profile Sound, Vancouver, British Columbia, Canada
- Genre: Punk rock
- Length: 70:34
- Label: Alternative Tentacles
- Producer: Cec English; Nomeansno

Nomeansno compilation chronology
The Day Everything Became Isolated and Destroyed (1988)	Sex Mad/You Kill Me (1991)

The Day Everything Became Isolated and Destroyed is a compilation album of two records by Vancouver punk band Nomeansno. The compilation album comprises the EP The Day Everything Became Nothing and the full-length album Small Parts Isolated and Destroyed, both recorded during the same December 1987 recording session.

Small Parts Isolated and Destroyed was Nomeansno's second album with longtime guitarist Andy Kerr and first recorded after signing with the prominent punk rock label Alternative Tentacles. The songs on the two records are highly experimental both sonically and compositionally, and ranks among the band's most challenging works.

== Background and recording ==
Nomeansno was founded as a two-piece band by brothers Rob and John Wright in 1979, but expanded with the 1983 addition of guitarist Andy Kerr. The band toured North America extensively, recorded the Sex Mad album in 1985, and signed to the prominent punk label Alternative Tentacles shortly thereafter.

In December 1987, the band entered producer Cecil English's Profile Sound Studios to record a follow-up to Sex Mad. Their new material was increasingly complex musically, drawing as much on progressive rock as the punk rock with which the band was associated. The band utilized the studio effects available to them in Profile Sound, further adding to the complexity of the material.

== Release ==
Alternative Tentacles issued the two vinyl records separately, but collected the material on a single CD. In 2002, Nomeansno bought the rights to their back catalogue from Alternative Tentacles and issued The Day Everything Became Isolated and Destroyed on CD and LP in 2007 and 2013, preserving the track listing of the first CD issue.

== Reception ==
Professional ratings
Review scores
Source	Rating
Allmusic	4/5 stars
Alltime Records	4.5/7 stars

Due to its challenging nature, the material on the compilation album has been received cautiously but positively by critics. Writing for Alltime Records, critic Guy Peters called the material the band's "least accessible," but nonetheless praised the record within the band's legacy and awarded it four-and-a-half out of seven stars. AllMusic critic Sean Carruthers wrote more reverently of the material on the Day Everything Became Nothing EP and awarded the overall package four out of five stars, as opposed to the two-and-a-half stars he had given Small Parts Isolated and Destroyed alone.

== Track listing ==
1. "The Day Everything Became Nothing" – 3:59
2. "Dead Souls" – 1:37
3. "Forget Your Life" – 5:09
4. "Beauty And The Beast" – 3:47
5. "Brother Rat/What Slayde Says" – 9:06
6. "Dark Ages" – 5:21
7. "Junk" – 3:37
8. "And That's Sad" – 6:46
9. "Small Parts Isolated And Destroyed" – 7:22
10. "Victory" – 7:55
11. "Teresa, Give Me That Knife" – 2:12
12. "Real Love" – 9:56
13. "Lonely" – 3:39
- Tracks 1–5 released on The Day Everything Became Nothing EP.
- Tracks 6–13 released on Small Parts Isolated and Destroyed.

== Personnel ==
Nomeansno

- Andy Kerr – vocals, guitar, bass
- John Wright – vocals, drums, keyboards, percussion
- Rob Wright – vocals, guitar, bass, artwork

Additional musician

- Jon Card – percussion (track 4)

Production and artwork

- Cec English – producer
- John Yates – artwork
