= 0 + 2 = 1 ½ =

0 + 2 = 1 1/2

Compilation album by Nomeansno
- Released: 2010
- Recorded: July 1991
- Studio: Profile Sound Studios, Vancouver, British Columbia, Canada
- Genre: Post-hardcore
- Length: 56:04
- Label: Wrong Records
- Producer: Cecil English, Nomeansno

Nomeansno compilation chronology
| The People's Choice (2004) | 0 + 2 = 1 1/2 (2010) |

0 + 2 = 1 1/2 is a compilation album by Vancouver punk band Nomeansno recorded in 1991 and released digitally in 2010. It includes five outtakes and four demos recorded for 0 + 2 = 1, Nomeansno's fifth album and final to feature longtime guitarist Andy Kerr.

== Background and release ==
In July 1991, Nomeansno returned to Profile Sound Studios to record their follow-up to the album Wrong with producer Cecil English. They recorded 19 songs during the sessions. Of these, 11 appeared on the final record, 0 + 2 = 1 on Alternative Tentacles, two on the "Oh Canaduh" 7-inch EP on Allied Recordings, and one on the Dead Kennedys tribute album Virus 100. The remaining five outtakes were ultimately re-recorded for subsequent Nomeansno albums, but went unreleased in these earlier forms for 19 years.

Andy Kerr, who departed the band after the touring in support of the album's release, later rediscovered the outtakes and demos. Ultimately, the band released these as 0 + 2 = 1 1/2, a digitally released compilation through Wrong Records. It was initially issued as a free download.

== Track listing ==
All songs written by Nomeansno.

1. "Cats, Sex and Nazis" – 8:04
2. "I Need You" – 7:31
3. "Lost" – 6:16
4. "Blinding Light" – 2:53
5. "This Wound Will Never Heal" – 6:59
6. "John Instrumental" (Demo) – 3:49
7. "Victim's Choice" / "Happy Bridge" / "Intro Ghosts" (Demo) – 6:54
8. "Now It's Dark" (Demo) – 5:06
9. "Cats, Sex and Nazis" (Demo) – 8:32

== Personnel ==
Nomeansno

- Andy Kerr – guitar, bass, vocals
- John Wright (Mr. Right) – vocals, drums, keyboards, percussion, engineering
- Rob Wright (Mr. Wrong) – vocals, bass, guitar

Production and design

- David Bruce – artwork
- Brian (Who) Else – engineering
- Cecil English – producer, engineering
