= Dad/Revenge =

Single by Nomeansno
- Released: 1987
- Recorded: 1985
- Studio: Keye Studios
- Genre: Punk rock
- Length: 8:22
- Label: Alternative Tentacles
- Producer: Nomeansno

Nomeansno EPs and singles chronology
"You Kill Me" (1985)	"Dad/Revenge" (1987)	"The Day Everything Became Nothing" (1987)

"Dad/Revenge" is a single by Canadian punk rock band Nomeansno. Recorded in 1985, it features two tracks from Nomeansno's 1986 album Sex Mad. "Dad" was a minor college radio hit.

== Background and release ==
Nomeansno entered Keye Studios late in 1985 to record Sex Mad, their first album after becoming a three-piece with the addition of guitarist Andy Kerr joining founding members Rob and John Wright. Initially released on the Canadian label Psyche Industry Records, the album was picked up by Alternative Tentacles in 1986 and reissued in the United States and Europe.

Alternative Tentacles released the "Dad/Revenge" 7" vinyl single in 1987 to support the album. Additionally, the royalties from the sale of the single were donated to the No More Censorship Defense Fund.

== Reception ==
AllMusic critic Ned Raggett retrospectively praised both songs on the single. He called "Dad" "...a bit chilling, even though it's spit out at slam-pit's pace". He further noted the classic rock influence which contrasts with the band's punk rock influences, stating that "the chorus of 'Revenge' is perfectly anthemic stadium rock, and works on that level without a problem." Writing for Trouser Press, critic Ira Robbins praised the band for "pour[ing] out punky collegiate weirdness and slash'n'burn egghead energy."

== Track listing ==
All songs written by Nomeansno

Side A

1. "Dad" – 3:01

Side B

1. "Revenge" – 5:21

== Personnel ==
Nomeansno

- Andy Kerr – guitar, vocals, bass
- Rob Wright – bass, vocals, guitar
- John Wright – drums, keyboards, vocals

Production and artwork

- Craig Bougie and John Wright – engineering, mixing
- Nomeansno – production
