= The Day Everything Became Nothing =

EP by Nomeansno
- Released: 1988
- Recorded: December 1987
- Studio: Profile Sound, Vancouver, British Columbia, Canada
- Genre: Punk rock
- Length: 23:16
- Label: Alternative Tentacles
- Producer: Cec English, Nomeansno

Nomeansno singles and EPs chronology
Dad/Revenge (1987)	The Day Everything Became Nothing (1988)	The Power of Positive Thinking (1990)

The Day Everything Became Nothing is an EP by Vancouver punk rock band Nomeansno. It was recorded during the same December 1987 recording sessions that yielded the Small Parts Isolated and Destroyed album. These two records were packaged together on the compilation album The Day Everything Became Isolated and Destroyed. The material on the EP is highly experimental both sonically and compositionally, and ranks among the band's most challenging works.

== Background, recording, release ==
Nomeansno entered the Profile Sound recording studio in December 1987 to record the follow-up to their second album, Sex Mad. The resultant sessions yielded both the EP The Day Everything Became Nothing and the album Small Parts Isolated and Destroyed, which were later packaged together on compact disc as The Day Everything Became Isolated and Destroyed.

Included on the EP was the track "Forget Your Life," a new version of a song from Nomeansno's 1981 EP Betrayal, Fear, Anger, Hatred. Drummer Jon Card of Personality Crisis, D.O.A., and later SNFU and The Subhumans, played percussion on "Beauty and the Beast".

== Reception ==
Professional ratings
Review scores
Source	Rating
Allmusic	4/5 stars

Critic Guy Peters wrote that the material from the December 1987 session ranks among the band's most challenging and uninviting. The EP, however, has generally fared better critically than Small Parts Isolated and Destroyed. Writing for AllMusic, Sean Carruthers likened the EP to a mix of "Led Zeppelin, Frank Zappa and Johnny Rotten" and awarded the EP four out of five stars.

== Track listing ==
All songs written by Nomeansno

1. "The Day Everything Became Nothing" – 4:00
2. "Dead Souls" – 1:39
3. "Forget Your Life" – 5:00
4. "Beauty and the Beast" – 3:46
5. "Brother Rat/What Slayde Says" – 8:51

== Personnel ==
Nomeansno

- Andy Kerr – vocals, guitar
- John Wright – vocals, drums, keyboards, percussion
- Rob Wright – vocals, bass, guitar, artwork

Additional musician

- Jon Card – percussion (track 4)

Production and artwork

- Craig Bougie – technician
- Cec English – producer, engineering
- John Yates – artwork
