= Mr. Right & Mr. Wrong: One Down & Two to Go =

Mr. Right & Mr. Wrong: One Down & Two To Go

Compilation album by Nomeansno
- Released: 1994
- Genre: Punk rock
- Label: Wrong Records

Nomeansno compilation chronology
Sex Mad/You Kill Me (1991)	Mr. Right & Mr. Wrong: One Down & Two To Go (1994)	The People's Choice (2004)

Mr. Right & Mr. Wrong: One Down & Two To Go is a compilation album by Nomeansno. After the departure of long-time guitarist Andy Kerr, the group's lineup stood simply as a two-piece (brothers Rob and John Wright) at the time of the album's recording.

The tracks on the album are culled from three sources – five songs (tracks 4, 6, 12, 15 and 16) from home demos dating from 1979-1980, four outtakes (3, 5, 7 and 9) from the 1993 Why Do They Call Me Mr. Happy? album, and several new songs (1, 2, 8, 10, 11, 13 and 14) from a 1994 session. Of this latter group, two (8, 14) are performed by Mr. Wrong, Rob Wright's solo project, one (13) attributed to the Nomeansno side-project The Hanson Brothers, (12,15) are performed by John Wright/Andy Kerr project, Infamous Scientist, one is a cover of a Nomeansno song (10) by the Vancouver, British Columbia-based band Swell Prod.

== Track listing ==
1. "Intro" – 2:23
2. "Red on Red" – 3:37
3. "Who Fucked Who?" – 6:26
4. "Pigs and Dogs" – 5:25
5. "Widget" – 3:40
6. "More ICBMs" – 3:09
7. "Blinding Light" – 2:45
8. "I'm Doing Well" – 4:04
9. "This Wound Will Never Heal" – 6:23
10. "Real Love" – 3:40
11. "Remember" – 3:30
12. "Baldwang Must Die" – 2:01
13. "Victoria" – 2:31
14. "Sitting on Top of the World" – 5:05
15. "Canada is Pissed" – 3:11
16. "Burn" – 5:37

== Personnel ==
- John Wright (Mr. Right) – Vocals, Drums, Keyboards
- Rob Wright (Mr. Wrong) – Vocals, Bass, Guitar
- Tom Holliston – Guitar (track 13)
- Ken Kempster – Drums (track 10)
- Ken Jensen – Drums (track 13)
- Swell Prod. – track 10
- The Hanson Brothers – track 13
