= The Power of Positive Thinking (EP) =

EP by Nomeansno
- Released: 1990
- Recorded: January 1985 at Mushroom Studios/ Summer 1989 at Profile Studios, Vancouver B.C., Canada
- Genre: Post-hardcore
- Label: Alternative Tentacles
- Producers: Nomeansno, Greg Reely, Cec English

Nomeansno singles and EPs chronology
The Day Everything Became Nothing (1988)	The Power of Positive Thinking (1990)	O Canaduh (1992)

The Power of Positive Thinking is an EP by Canadian punk rock band Nomeansno. "I Am Wrong" and "Life in Hell" were both new tracks while "Manic Depression" was a Jimi Hendrix cover recorded in 1985 and remixed for release on the EP.

== Track listing ==
1. "I Am Wrong"
2. "Manic Depression" (Jimi Hendrix cover)
3. "Life in Hell"

== Personnel ==
- Craig Bougie – Live Sound
- Cec English – Producer (Tracks 1 & 3)
- Andy Kerr – Guitar, Vocals
- Greg Reely – Producer (Track 2)
- John Wright – Drums, Vocals
- Rob Wright – Bass, Vocals
- John Yates – Artwork
