= Generic Shame =

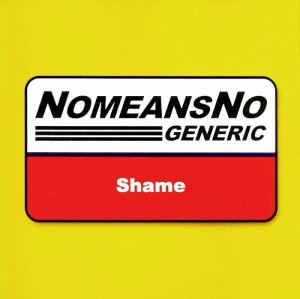

EP by Nomeansno
- Released: 2001
- Recorded: 2000
- Genre: Punk rock
- Length: 22:28
- Label: Wrong Records
- Producer: Nomeansno

Nomeansno singles and EPs chronology
In the Fishtank 1 (1996)	Generic Shame (2001)	Tour EP 1 (2010)

Generic Shame is an EP from Vancouver punk rock band Nomeansno. Released in 2001 on Wrong Records, the three-song EP was recorded during the same sessions which produced the album One.

== Background and release ==
In 1999, Nomeansno members and brothers Rob and John Wright rehearsed a batch of long and ponderous songs originally intended for their side project Mr. Right and Mr. Wrong. The Wrights ultimately decided, however, to release the material as the ninth Nomeansno album. The band recorded the album at Lemon Loaf Studios in Vancouver with Marc L'Esperance, and eight songs from the session became the One album on Alternative Tentacles. Three remaining tracks were issued the following year as Generic Shame on the band's own Wrong Records. Rob Wright later explained that the songs did not fit the intended mood of One.

== Track listing ==
All songs written by Nomeansno.

1. Sex Is Philosophy – 6:35
2. No Big Surprise – 11:19
3. I Get Up In The Morning – 4:34

== Personnel ==
Nomeansno

- Tom Holliston – guitar, vocals
- John Wright – vocals, drums, keyboards
- Rob Wright – vocals, bass

Production

- Marc L'Esperance – mixing, mastering
