= You Kill Me (EP) =

EP by Nomeansno
- Released: 1985
- Recorded: 1985
- Studio: Mushroom Studios, Vancouver, British Columbia
- Genre: Punk rock
- Length: 17:41
- Label: Undergrowth, Alternative Tentacles
- Producer: Nomeansno, Greg Reely

Nomeansno singles and EPs chronology
Betrayal, Fear, Anger, Hatred (1981)	You Kill Me (1985)	Dad/Revenge (1987)

You Kill Me is an EP by Canadian punk rock band Nomeansno. Recorded in 1985, it is the first Nomeansno record to feature the band's three-piece lineup, with guitarist Andy Kerr joining founding members Rob Wright and John Wright. Originally issued on the Undergrowth label, it was later re-released on CD with the Sex Mad album on the Sex Mad/You Kill Me compilation CD and cassette released by Alternative Tentacles.

== Background and recording ==
Brothers Rob and John Wright formed Nomeansno in 1979, initially as a home-recording project and later as a two-piece live group. The two released several records, including their debut LP, Mama. John Wright also began playing drums with the Victoria punk band The Infamous Scientists, led by vocalist and guitarist Andy Kerr. When The Infamous Scientists disbanded in 1983, and after several months of coercion, Kerr joined Nomeansno.

After performing locally and touring, adapting older material for the three-piece lineup, and composing new material, the group entered Mushroom Studio in Vancouver in 1985 to record a new EP. The band recorded four original songs and a cover of "Manic Depression" by Jimi Hendrix. The sessions were co-produced by Greg Reely, who later produced albums for Sarah McLachlan, Front Line Assembly, Fear Factory, Machine Head, Coldplay, and Skinny Puppy.

== Release ==
You Kill Me was initially issued on 12" vinyl by Undergrowth Records. Nomeansno embarked on extensive touring throughout North America in support of it. They signed with Alternative Tentacles in 1986, who issued a remixed version of the EP on 12" vinyl in 1991, and later repackaged it with Nomeansno's second LP, Sex Mad, as the Sex Mad/You Kill Me compilation CD and cassette.

Nomeansno left Alternative Tentacles and began reissuing their back catalogue on their own Wrong Records imprint, with distribution by Southern Records. Neither Sex Mad nor You Kill Me, however, has been reissued by Wrong.

== Reception ==
You Kill Me was praised retrospectively by critics, typically in the context of its situation beside Sex Mad. AllMusic critic Ned Raggett noted the classic rock influence which contrasts with the band's punk rock influences, praising the cover of "Manic Depression." Writing for Trouser Press, critic Ira Robbins praised the EP's dark humor and musical prowess.

== Track listing ==
All songs written by Nomeansno except track 4, written by Jimi Hendrix.

1. "Body Bag" – 4:39
2. "Stop It" – 4:36
3. "Some Bodies" – 4:04
4. "Manic Depression" – 2:32
5. "Paradise" – 3:50

== Personnel ==
Nomeansno

- Andy Kerr – vocals, guitar
- John Wright – vocals, drums, keyboards, percussion
- Rob Wright – vocals, bass, guitar, artwork

Production and artwork

- Greg Reely – producer, engineer
- FBN – layout, graphics
- Ric Arboit – technician, co-production
