= The Sky Is Falling and I Want My Mommy =

Studio album by Jello Biafra & Nomeansno
- Released: July 1, 1991
- Recorded: 1991
- Genre: Hardcore punk
- Length: 35:50
- Label: Alternative Tentacles
- Producer: Jello Biafra, Mr. Right, Buttercup

Jello Biafra chronology
I Blow Minds for a Living (1991)	The Sky Is Falling and I Want My Mommy (1991)	Tumor Circus (1991)

NoMeansNo chronology
Live + Cuddly (1991)	The Sky Is Falling and I Want My Mommy (1991)	0 + 2 = 1 (1991)

Professional ratings
Review scores
Source	Rating
AllMusic	4/5 stars
Punknews.org	4/5 stars

The Sky Is Falling and I Want My Mommy is an album recorded by Jello Biafra with the Canadian punk band Nomeansno. The project came about after Nomeansno and Biafra had collaborated (on the song "Falling Space Junk (Hold the Anchovies)") for the soundtrack to the underground film Terminal City Ricochet. The title track is a new recording of "Falling Space Junk" with amended lyrics. Jello wrote the lyrics to "Bruce's Diary" from the perspective of his Ricochet character Bruce Coddle, but did so after the movie was released, so the song is only featured on this album.

== Track listing ==
1. "The Sky Is Falling, and I Want My Mommy (Falling Space Junk)" – 3:15
2. "Jesus Was a Terrorist" – 2:34
3. "Bruce's Diary" – 5:19
4. "Bad" – 2:18
5. "Ride the Flume" – 2:38
6. "Chew" – 8:47
7. "Sharks in the Gene Pool" – 6:34
8. "The Myth Is Real – Let's Eat" – 5:45

== Personnel ==
Performance Credits

- Jello Biafra – vocals
- John Wright – drums, backing vocals on "Sharks In The Gene Pool" and "Chew", horn arrangement on "Bruce's Diary"
- Rob Wright – bass, guitar, backing vocals on "Sharks In The Gene Pool"
- Andy Kerr – guitar, bass
- Cecil English – backing vocals on "Chew"
- Craig Bougie – backing vocals on "Sharks In The Gene Pool"
- Mark Critchley – backing vocals on "Chew"
- Blair Dobson – backing vocals on "Chew"
- Lissa Beurge – backing vocals on "Sharks In The Gene Pool" and "Chew"
- Pam Ireland – backing vocals on "Sharks In The Gene Pool"
- The Totaliterrortones – horns on "Bruce's Diary"

Technical Credits

- Jello Biafra – Producer
- Cecil English – Engineer
- George Horn – Mastering, Master Clearance
- Mister Right – Producer
- John Wright – Engineer
- John Yates – Liner Design
- Mark Critchley – Programming
