= Mama (Nomeansno album) =

Studio album by Nomeansno
- Released: 1982
- Recorded: 1982
- Studio: Key Studios, Victoria, British Columbia
- Genre: Punk jazz
- Length: 39:50
- Label: Wrong
- Producer: Nomeansno

Nomeansno chronology
| Mama (1982) | Sex Mad (1986) |

Mama is the debut album by Victoria, British Columbia punk rock band Nomeansno. Featuring the band's original incarnation comprising brothers John and Rob Wright, the album was released independently on LP in 1982. Nomeansno reissued a remastered version the album in 1992 on their own Wrong Records imprint, coupled with the tracks from their Betrayal, Fear, Anger, Hatred EP of 1981.

Recorded after a period of gigging as a two-piece lineup with bass, drums, and vocals, the album reflects the band's early live sound, with minimal guitar overdubs. Nomeansno later expanded their sound with the addition of guitarist Andy Kerr and developed a following after signing with the Alternative Tentacles imprint, but Mama remained popular with fans and critics. Writing for Trouser Press, critic Ira Robbins described Mama and the band's early 7-inches as "Devo on a jazz trip, Motörhead after art school, or Wire on psychotic steroids."

== Background and recording ==
Brothers Rob and John Wright began recording music in their parents' basement in 1979. They adopted the moniker Nomeansno and recorded songs with traditional rock arrangements, including guitar, bass, drums, keyboards, and vocals. Some of these recordings were issued as the "Look, Here Come the Wormies / SS Social Service" split 7-inch (1980) and the Betrayal, Fear, Anger, Hatred EP (1981), while others appeared on various compilations throughout the next few decades.

In 1981, the brothers began performing as a live duo comprising bass and drums, played by Rob and John respectively, while both sang. The songs from this incarnation featured hardcore punk influence, but their sound remained experimental. John Wright later reflected on their early sound and its development without a guitar:

You don’t have guitar solos, you don’t have the wash of high end. And the things you do on the drums are different, if you just did a straight four beat on the drums it would get kinda dull after awhile. It isn’t as though bass guitar hasn’t been a prominent instrument at times in other bands but it made us approach things differently, our song structure couldn’t just be verse-chorus-verse. It had everything to do with how our sound got off to a unique start.

The band recorded some of these songs at Key Studios in Victoria in 1982 with engineer Sandra Lange. Rob Wright added very minimal guitar overdubs, and John Wright additional keyboards. Tracks 1 through 8 on Mama were taken from the Key Studios session, while the final track, "Living in Détente," was taken from the brothers' home recordings. The Key Studios session also yielded the outtake "No Means No." This song was later reissued on compilations, including Over a Century of Vivisection and Anti-Vivisection (How Much Longer?) in 1992 and All Your Ears Can Hear in 2007.

== Release ==
The album was originally self-released by the band in a limited run of 500 copies. The cover featured a Rorschach test and lettering by future Nomeansno member Andy Kerr. The band distributed the copies themselves, and the album quickly went out of print.

With the original reels from the recording session thought to be lost, Nomeansno later issued a cassette version made from a vinyl copy of the album to be sold through mail order. As the band gained an international audience through touring and further albums, original copies of the Mama LP became highly sought collector's items.

The original reels were ultimately rediscovered, and the tracks were remastered in 1992 at Whipping Post Studio in Vancouver. The band issued a CD version of the album, packaged with the four tracks from the Betrayal, Fear, Anger, Hatred EP, on their own Wrong Records that year.

An additional CD re-release was issued in 2004, which included bonus video footage of the Wrights performing "Rich Guns" and "Forget Your Life" on public broadcast television in 1981. Wrong Records reissued further LP versions in 2012 and 2013.

== Reception ==
Professional ratings
Review scores
| Source | Rating |
|---|---|
| AllMusic | 3/5 stars |

Mama was largely ignored by the music press upon its initial release. Critics generally received the album well retrospectively, while hedging that it anticipated, but did not fulfill, the band's potential. Trouser Press critic Ira Robbins retrospectively praised the album as "an accomplished and impressive display of taut and direct lock-formation bass/drums/etc. simplicity" with "pointedly warped lyrics." AllMusic critic and former manager of the band, Laurie Mercer called the album "an intriguing embryonic work for the band" but assessed the record as "underwhelming compared to later work." Mercer awarded the album three out of five possible stars. Upon its 2013 vinyl re-release, Exclaim! critic Gregory Adams wrote that the album is "full of dark yet inspiring lyrics and signature dynamics and hints at the emotional menace and musical fury that was to come."

== Track listing ==
=== Original LP ===
Side one

1. "Living is Free" – 4:19
2. "My Roommate is Turning into a Monster" – 3:59
3. "Red Devil" – 5:37
4. "Mama's Little Boy" – 5:46

Side two

1. "We Are the Chopped" – 5:14
2. "No Sex" – 2:43
3. "Rich Guns" – 3:48
4. "No Rest for the Wicked" – 4:59
5. "Living in Détente" – 3:19

=== CD version ===
1. "Living Is Free" – 4:28
2. "My Roommate Is Turning into a Monster" – 4:07
3. "Red Devil" – 5:48
4. "Mama's Little Boy" – 6:01
5. "We Are the Chopped" – 5:25
6. "No Sex" – 2:48
7. "Rich Guns" – 3:55
8. "No Rest for the Wicked" – 5:11
9. "Living in Détente" – 3:19
10. "Try Not to Stutter" – 2:47
11. "I'm All Wet" – 2:46
12. "Approaching Zero" – 2:20
13. "Forget Your Life" – 5:50
- Bonus videos included in 2004 reissue: "Rich Guns" and "Forget Your Life" live in 1981

== Personnel ==
- Rob Wright – bass, vocals, guitars
- John Wright – drums, vocals, keyboard, bells, percussion
- Eric Sinclair – saxophone ("Approaching Zero")
- Sandra Lange – engineer
- Marc L'Esperance – re-mastering
- Marcus Rodgers – video files
