= Hissanol =

Indie rock band

- Origin: Amsterdam, Netherlands; Victoria, British Columbia, Canada
- Genres: Indie rock, experimental rock
- Years active: 1994–1998
- Label: Alternative Tentacles
- Past members: Andy Kerr; Scott Henderson

Hissanol were a two-piece experimental indie rock band based in both Amsterdam, the Netherlands and Victoria, British Columbia, Canada. Active between 1994 and 1998, the band was a studio-only project from former NoMeansNo guitarist Andy Kerr and Scott Henderson of Shovlhed, Swell Prod., the Showbusiness Giants, and other groups.

Since its two members lived on separate continents, the band collaborated via air mail, building upon each other's songs on multi-track recording equipment. Each member played a number of instruments and sang. The group released two full-length albums on Alternative Tentacles. In a review of their debut album 4th and Back (1995), AllMusic drew comparisons to Gang of Four, The Fall and OMD.

Both musicians remain active; Kerr is currently playing in Two Pin Din.

== Discography ==
- 4th and Back CD/LP (1995, Alternative Tentacles)
- The Making of Him CD/LP (1998, Alternative Tentacles)
