= Small Parts Isolated and Destroyed =

Studio album by Nomeansno
- Released: May 1988
- Recorded: December 1987
- Studio: Profile Sound, Vancouver, British Columbia, Canada
- Genre: Punk rock
- Length: 46:31
- Label: Alternative Tentacles
- Producer: Cecil English, Nomeansno

Nomeansno chronology
Sex Mad (1986)	Small Parts Isolated and Destroyed (1988)	Wrong (1989)

Small Parts Isolated and Destroyed is the third full-length album by Vancouver punk rock band Nomeansno. It was their second album with longtime guitarist Andy Kerr and first recorded after signing with the prominent punk rock label Alternative Tentacles. The album is highly experimental both sonically and compositionally, and ranks among the band's most challenging works. It was released on LP in 1988, and issued on the CD compilation album The Day Everything Became Isolated and Destroyed with the EP The Day Everything Became Nothing, recorded during the same sessions.

== Background, recording, release ==
Nomeansno entered the Profile Sound recording studio in December 1987 to record the follow-up to their second album, Sex Mad. The resultant sessions yielded both the EP The Day Everything Became Nothing and the album Small Parts Isolated and Destroyed, which were later packaged together on compact disc as The Day Everything Became Isolated and Destroyed.

== Reception ==
Professional ratings
Review scores
Source	Rating
Allmusic	2.5/5 stars

AllMusic critic Sean Carruthers awarded the album two-and-a-half out of five stars. He praised the album's "tight instrumentation which is informed both by punk and by jazz," but argued that the material ultimately "lacked zip."

== Track listing ==
All songs written by Nomeansno

Side one

1. "Dark Ages" – 5:17
2. "Junk" – 3:38
3. "And That's Sad" – 6:33
4. "Small Parts Isolated and Destroyed" – 7:20

Side two

1. "Victory" – 7:57
2. "Teresa, Give Me That Knife" – 2:14
3. "Real Love" – 9:59
4. "Lonely" – 3:38

== Personnel ==
Nomeansno

- Rob Wright – vocals, guitar, bass, artwork
- John Wright – vocals, drums, keyboards, percussion
- Andy Kerr (credited as "Someone (but we're not sure whom)") – vocals, guitar, bass

Additional musicians

- Craig Bougie – technician, vocals (track 4)
- Ingrid the Hun – toys (track 2)

Production and artwork

- Cec English – producer
- John Yates – artwork
