= Intermission: Extraneous Music from the Residents' Mole Show =

EP by The Residents
- Released: October 1982
- Recorded: June 1981–August 1982
- Genre: Avant-garde
- Label: Ralph

The Residents chronology
The Tunes of Two Cities (1982)	Intermission: Extraneous Music from the Residents' Mole Show (1982)	Title in Limbo (1983)

Professional ratings
Review scores
Source	Rating
AllMusic	4/5 stars

Intermission: Extraneous Music from the Residents' Mole Show is an EP by The Residents, released in 1982. It features music from the opening, closing, and intermission portions of the Mole Show. It was the first in a line of albums that would bear the warning that it was not part three of the Mole Trilogy.

The infant on the cover is Jana Flynn, daughter of The Residents' spokesperson and manager Homer Flynn.

All the EP's songs were issued as bonus tracks on the original 1987 CD release of Mark of the Mole.

Punk band NoMeansNo covered "Would We Be Alive?" twice: once on an EP of the same name, then again on their In the Fishtank 1 EP.

== Track listing ==
1. "Lights Out" (Prelude)
2. "Shorty's Lament" (Intermission)
3. "The Moles Are Coming" (Intermission)
4. "Would We Be Alive?" (Intermission)
5. "The New Hymn" (Recessional)
