= One Down, Two to Go (disambiguation) =

One Down, Two to Go may refer to:

== Film ==
- One Down, Two to Go, a 1982 American film directed by and starring Fred Williamson

== Television ==
- "One Down, Two to Go" (Married... with Children), an episode of the American TV series Married... with Children

== Music ==
- "Enuff Is Enuff (Theme From The Movie "One Down, Two To Go")", the B-side of the 1982 single "Enuff Is Enuff" by the American composer Rodney Franklin
- Mr. Right & Mr. Wrong: One Down & Two to Go, a 1994 compilation album by the Canadian band Nomeansno
- "One Down Two to Go", a song by the Danish band King Diamond from their 1998 album Voodoo

== See also ==
- Monty Python Live (Mostly): One Down, Five to Go, a 2014 live special by Monty Python
