= Live + Cuddly =

Live album by Nomeansno
- Released: May 1991
- Recorded: Live in Vera, Groningen and Effenaar, Eindhoven, Holland, Spring 1990
- Genre: Punk rock
- Length: 72:56
- Label: Alternative Tentacles
- Producer: Nomeansno

Nomeansno chronology
Wrong (1989)	Live + Cuddly (1991)	The Sky Is Falling and I Want My Mommy (1991)

Professional ratings
Review scores
Source	Rating
Allmusic	4/5 stars

Live + Cuddly is a live album by Canadian punk rock band Nomeansno. Released in 1991, it featured live recordings from European performances in support of the band's album Wrong (1989). Live + Cuddly has been praised as one of the best punk rock live albums ever recorded. The cover photo features drummer John Wright on the left as a child, his cousin Tom, and an unknown wedding band drummer.

== Track listing ==
1. "It's Catching Up" – 4:09
2. "Two Lips, Two Lungs And One Tongue" – 3:07
3. "Rags and Bones" – 5:18
4. "Body Bag" – 6:40
5. "Brother Rat" – 2:11
6. "What Slayde Says" – 8:44
7. "Some Bodies" – 4:39
8. "Teresa, Give Me That Knife" – 2:19
9. "Victory" – 7:45
10. "Dark Ages" – 5:30
11. "The End Of All Things" – 5:50
12. "The Day Everything Became Nothing" – 5:28
13. "Dead Souls" – 1:50
14. "Metronome" – 7:34
15. "No Fucking" – 1:42

== Personnel ==
- Andy Kerr – Guitar, Bass, Vocals
- John Wright – Vocals, Drums, Keyboards, Percussion
- Rob Wright – Vocals, Guitar, Bass, Artwork
- Craig Bougie – Live Sound
- Dolf Planteydt – Mixing, Engineering
- John Yates – Artwork
