= Compressorhead =

Rock band made up of robot musicians

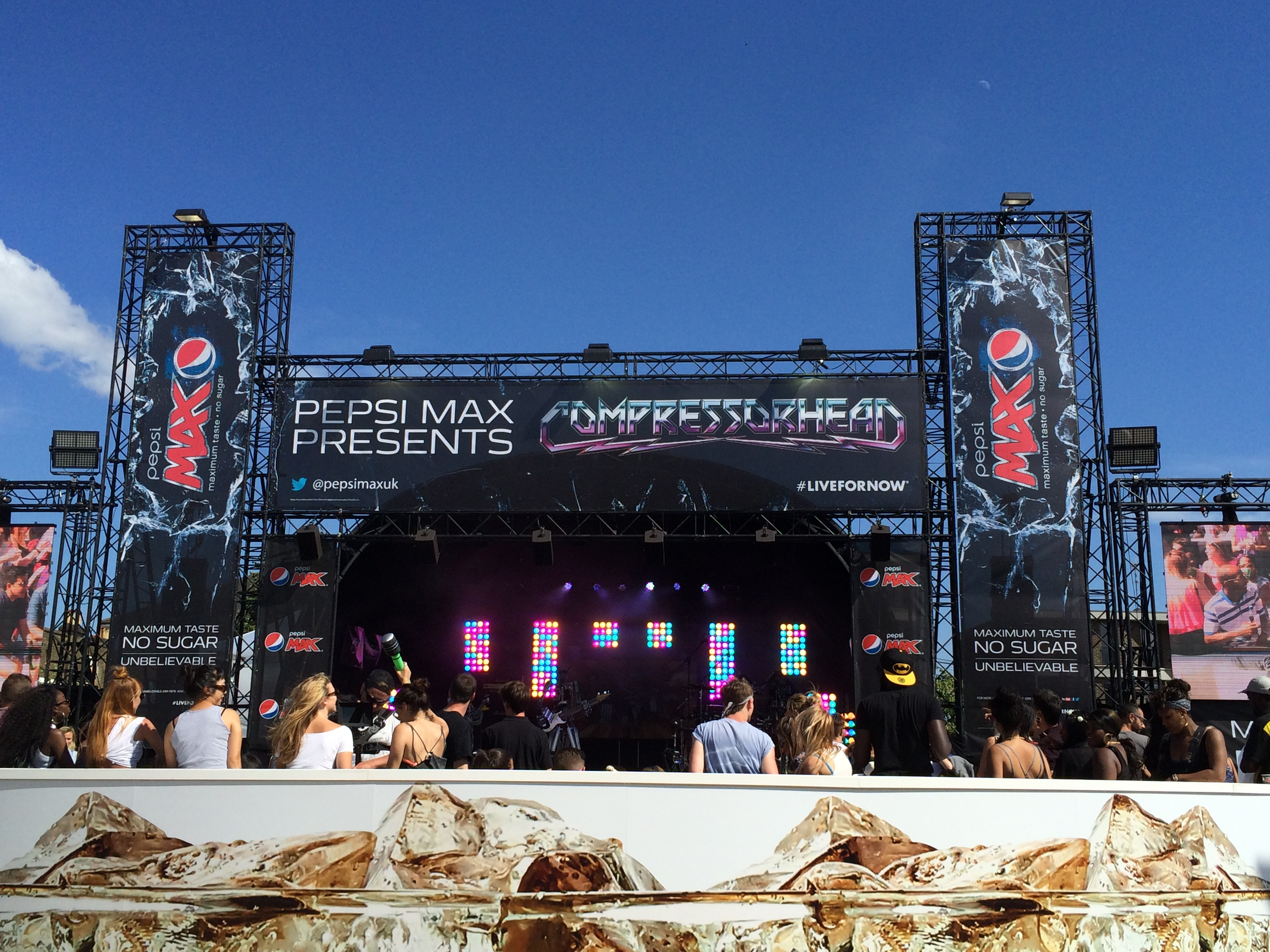
- Compressorhead performing in 2014 at the Wireless Festival, London

Background information
- Origin: Berlin, Germany
- Genres: Heavy metal, Punk rock
- Years active: 2013–present
- Members: Bones, Stickboy, Schmidi, Marsha, Mega-Wattson
- Past members: Fingers, Hellgå Tarr
- Website: robocross-machines.com

Compressorhead is an animatronic robot band created by Berlin-based artist Frank Barnes and collaborators Markus Kolb, Miles van Dorssen, Stock Plum, and John formerly of NoMeansNo, as musical director, songwriter and vocalist.

The six "performers" in the band are all robots made from recycled parts, playing real electric and acoustic instruments and controlled via a MIDI sequencer. The project initially debuted in 2013 with four robots (a guitarist, bassist, drummer and a small drummer's "assistant"), performing covers of famous rock songs. Two more robots (a vocalist and rhythm guitarist) were added to the group in 2017. In 2023, the entire band was seen in the movie Circus Maximus by rapper and producer Travis Scott.

== History ==
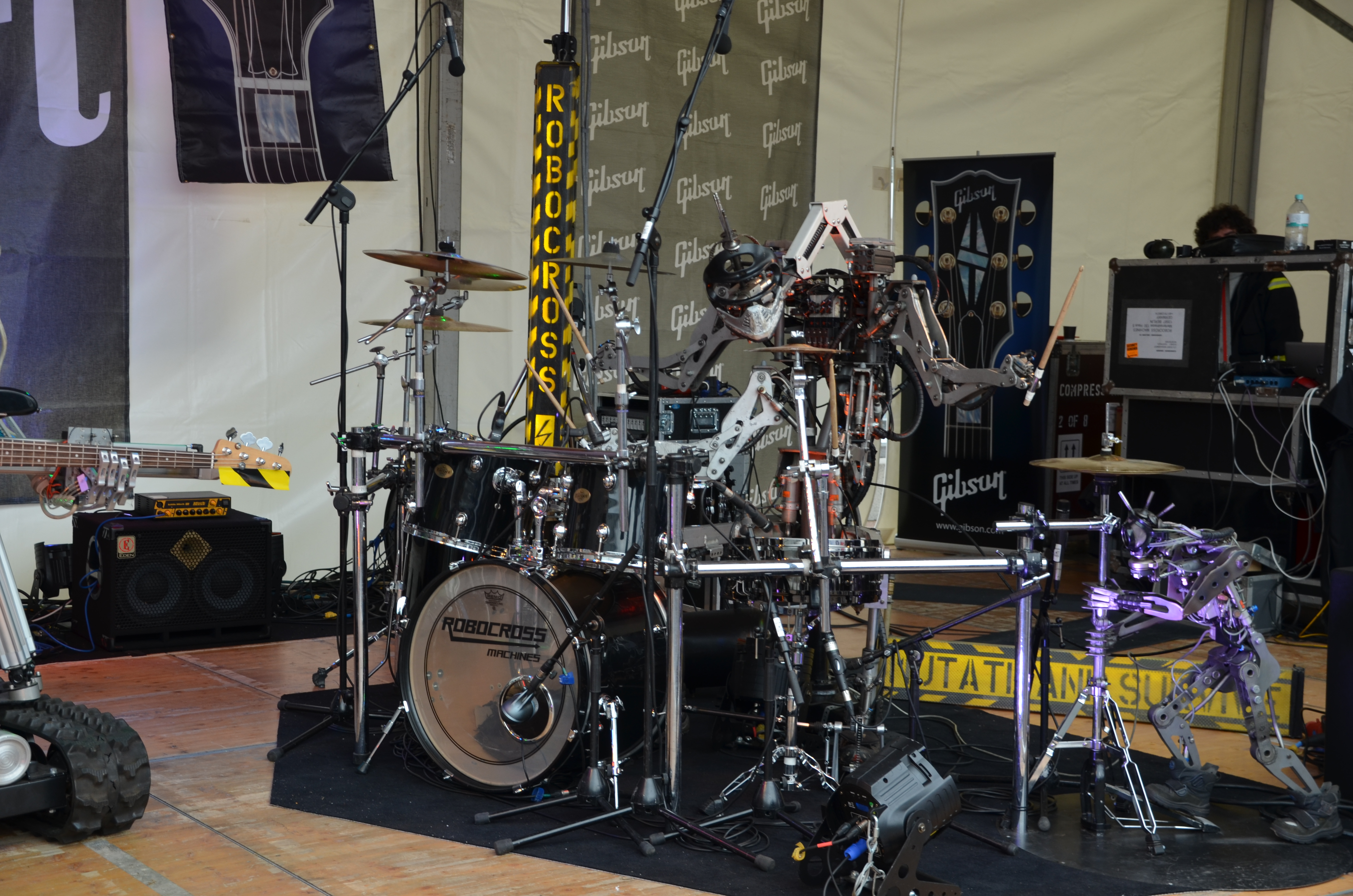
Stickboy (drummer), and Junior, operating the hi-hat

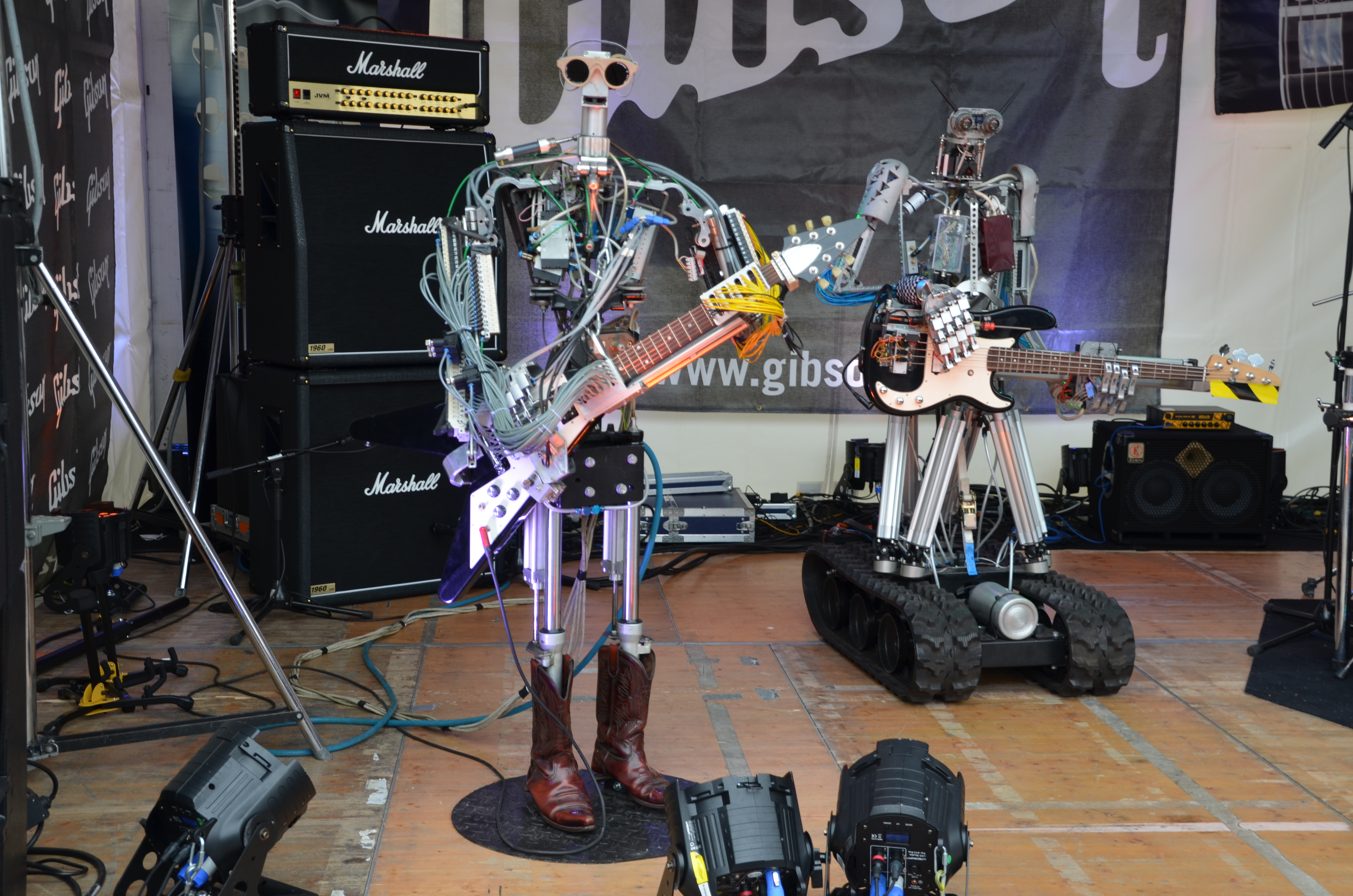
Fingers (lead guitarist) and Bones (bassist) performing in 2013

The first four robots (Stickboy, Junior, Fingers and Bones) were built between 2007 and 2012 and their first recorded performance was held at the Bülent Ceylan Show on the German RTL television channel in March 2012. Their first performance in front of a live audience was at the 2013 Big Day Out festival in Australia. The band gained initial notoriety on YouTube throughout 2013, uploading videos of classic rock covers from bands such as Motörhead, AC/DC, Pantera and the Ramones.

In early 2013, Barnes recruited John Wright of the Canadian punk band NoMeansNo and The Hanson Brothers as a songwriter and "musical director" for the group. Three songs from this collaboration were released via the band's YouTube page: the original songs "Compressorhead", "Speed Walking Lady" and an instrumental cover of the Hanson Brothers' song "My Girlfriend is a Robot".

In November 2015, the team behind the band started a crowdfunding campaign on the platform Kickstarter to raise US$290,000 to build a robotic "singer".

In 2017, the band added a vocalist robot, Mega-Wattson (voiced by John Wright), and Hellgå Tarr, a second guitarist, to the band. NoMeansNo members also perform as multi-instrumentalists on Compressorhead's debut album, Party Machine.

== Albums ==
- 2017 - Party Machine

== Band Members ==
Current

- Mega-Wattson - Lead singer; voiced by John Wright. It was built in 2017.
- Bones - Bassist; it has two hands, each with four individual fingers, and is mounted on a platform equipped with caterpillar tracks that allows it to move around onstage. It was built in 2012.
- Stickboy - Drummer; it has four arms to which the sticks are secured, and two legs that play the kick drum. Its head has several metal protrusions that resemble a Mohawk hairstyle. It was built in 2007.
  - Schmidi - An assistant to the drummer that operates the hi-hat cymbal and sings backing vocals. It was built in 2007.
- Marsha - Guitarist; it plays guitar with ten fingers and its body is a working stack guitar amplifier. It was built in 2026.

Former

- Fingers - Lead guitarist; it is equipped with two hands, with a total of 78 fingers. It was built in 2009.
- Hellgå Tarr - Rhythm guitarist and backup singer; it was built in 2017.
