= Sex Mad =

Studio album by Nomeansno
- Released: 1986
- Recorded: 1985
- Studio: Keye Studios
- Genre: Punk rock, noise rock, hardcore punk
- Length: 47:07 (Canada/UK); 45:46 (U.S.)
- Label: Psyche Industry (Canada) Alternative Tentacles (U.S.A., UK)
- Producer: Nomeansno

Nomeansno chronology
Mama (1982)	Sex Mad (1986)	Small Parts Isolated and Destroyed (1988)

Sex Mad is the second full-length album by Canadian punk rock band NoMeansNo. Released in 1986, it is the first Nomeansno LP to feature long-time guitarist Andy Kerr in addition to founding members Rob Wright and John Wright and the first Nomeansno album issued through Alternative Tentacles.

The album has been likened to "a psychiatrist's notebook detailing the growing hostility lying just below the shiny surface of mid-'80s North American society."

== Background and recording ==
Andy Kerr joined brothers Rob and John Wright in Nomeansno in 1983 after the demise of his and John Wright's previous band, The Infamous Scientists. Kerr's buzz-saw guitar tone and energetic stage presence brought a new dimension to the band. The three-piece lineup debuted in 1985 with the You Kill Me EP on Undergrowth Records.

Later in 1985, the band recorded the tracks that would comprise Sex Mad at Keye Studios. Craig Bougie, their future live sound engineer for nearly two decades, worked with the band in the studio for the first time. 12 of the songs recorded in the session would wind up on final versions of the record. "Dad" was released as a single with "Revenge" on Side B, and received airplay on college radio. The track "Dead Bob" contains a citation of Cream's hit "Sunshine of Your Love".

== Release ==
The LP was initially issued on Psyche Industry Records based in Montreal. Kerr provided the cover art. The band toured extensively in support of it, and caught the attention of Jello Biafra of the Dead Kennedys and the Alternative Tentacles record label in 1986. Alternative Tentacles ultimately issued Sex Mad in the United States and Europe, the former of which featured a reworked track listing. Nomeansno ultimately signed with the label and remained there until 2002, issuing nine studio albums, one collaborative LP, one live album, and numerous singles and EPs through the label. In 1992, Alternative Tentacles issued the Sex Mad/You Kill Me compilation CD and cassette, packaging Sex Mad with the preceding You Kill Me EP.

Nomeansno left Alternative Tentacles in 2002, and began reissuing their back catalogue through their own Wrong Records imprint, with distribution through Southern Records. Though Alternative Tentacles re-released Sex Mad in 2026, You Kill Me has yet to be reissued.

== Reception ==
Professional ratings
Review scores
Source	Rating
AllMusic	3/5 stars

Canadian music journalists Barclay, Jack, and Schnieder wrote that Sex Mad "roared out of the speakers like few [previous] Canadian albums had before" and called the record Nomeansno's "finest work to date". AllMusic critic Adam Bregman praised Sex Mad as one of Nomeansno's most "hard rocking" albums and ranked it among their most accessible work, despite several long and ponderous songs on the album's second side.

== Track listing ==
Canada and UK LP release:

Side Bob

1. "Sex Mad" – 4:15
2. "Dad" – 3:01
3. "Obsessed" – 3:36
4. "No Fgcnuik" (full band version) – 0:31
5. "Hunt the She Beast" – 5:33
6. "Dead Bob" – 6:02

Side Slayde

1. "Long Days" – 4:58
2. "Metronome" – 6:19
3. "Revenge" – 5:21
4. "Self Pity" – 7:31

U.S. LP release:

Side A ("This Side")

1. "Sex Mad" – 4:15
2. "Dad" – 3:01
3. "Obsessed" – 3:36
4. "No Fgcnuik" (a cappella version) – 0:31
5. "Love Thang" – 4:12
6. "Dead Bob" – 6:02

Side B ("Bat Side")

1. "Self Pity" – 7:31
2. "Long Days" – 4:58
3. "Metronome" – 6:19
4. "Revenge" – 5:21
- See also Sex Mad/You Kill Me compilation for CD and cassette reissue information

== Credits ==
Nomeansno

- Andy Kerr (credited as "No one particular") – guitar, vocals, bass
- Rob Wright – bass, vocals, guitar
- John Wright – drums, keyboards, vocals

Production and artwork

- Andy Kerr – artwork
- Craig Bougie and John Wright – engineering, mixing
- Nomeansno – production
