= Witch Hunt (band) =

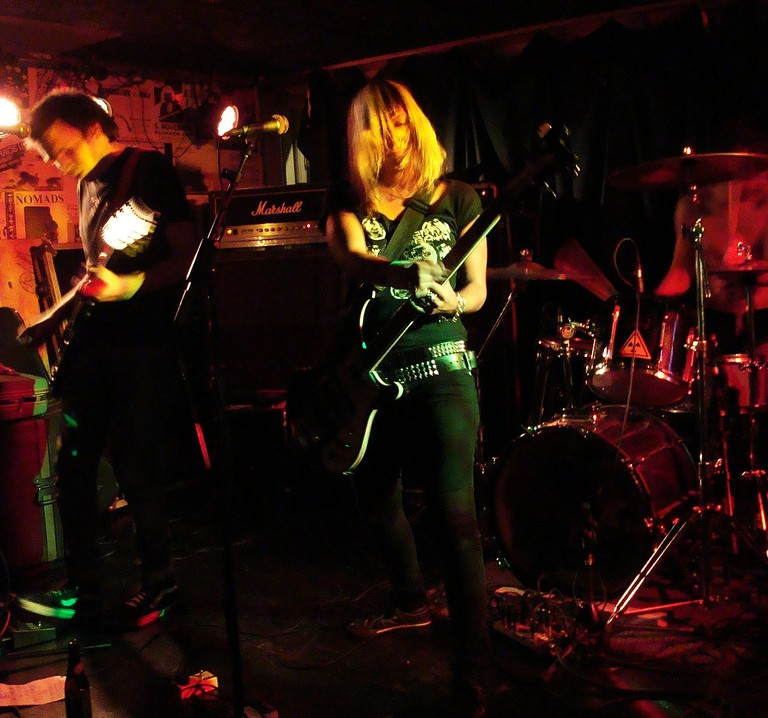

Background information
- Origin: Philadelphia, Pennsylvania, United States
- Genres: Hardcore punk, post-hardcore, D-beat
- Years active: 2001-present
- Labels: Witch Hunt, Profane Existence, Fistolo, Final Attempt, Fight For Your Mind, Alternative Tentacles
- Members: Janine Enriquez; Rob Fitzpatrick; Nicole Enriquez; Vince Klopfenstein
- Website: http://www.myspace.com/witchhunt

Witch Hunt are an American four-piece hardcore punk band currently located in Philadelphia, Pennsylvania, United States, who formed in 2001 in northern New Jersey. The band started out as a 3-piece with Janine on bass, Rob on drums, Nicole on guitar and all members sharing vocal duties. In 2005, Vince joined as the drummer and Rob switched to guitar. Members also play or have played in Lost Cause, End Me, Lusts, Clockcleaner, Sickoids, and Snowstorm. Their lyrics mainly speak of social-political themes such as imperialism, sexual abuse, the state, and the environment.

== Discography ==
- 2002: S/T 7" (Get The Axe/Reissued on This is Only the Beginning CD)
- 2003: Witch Hunt/Deathbag Split 7" (Hemorrhaging Loudness/Reissued on This is Only the Beginning CD)
- 2004: As Priorities Decay LP/CD (Profane Existence/Reissued on This is Only the Beginning CD)
- 2006: Blood-Red States LP/CD (Profane Existence/Reissued on Witch Hunt/Fistolo Records/Fight For Your Mind (France))
- 2007: This is Only the Beginning... CD (Fistolo Records)
- 2008: Witch Hunt/To What End? Split 7" (Witch Hunt/Final Attempt Records/Fight For Your Mind (France))
- 2009: Burning Bridges to Nowhere (Alternative Tentacles)
