= The Mentally Ill =

American punk band

The Mentally Ill was a punk band originating from Deerfield, Illinois in the late 1970s. Their 1979 7" single Gacy's Place named after notorious serial killer John Wayne Gacy, is considered by many to be one of the most unusual and legendary records of the early Chicago punk rock scene. They released another 7" record in 1982 entitled Sex Cells, before fading into obscurity.

The Mentally Ill reappeared in 1999 to record a full-length album with Steve Albini, entitled Strike the Bottom Red. In 2004, Jello Biafra released the Gacy's Place sessions in their entirety with a collection of old demo tapes on his well-known record label Alternative Tentacles.

On November 24, 2007, 28 years after the release of the Gacy's Place 7", The Mentally Ill played the You Weren't There afterparty at The Beat Kitchen, located at 2100 W. Belmont Ave. Chicago, IL. It was the first time The Mentally Ill played live, and the reviews of their performance were almost all positive. The band opened the set with "Tumor Boy" and closed with an encore of "Gacy's Place". On May 23, 2008 Mentally Ill performed at the three-day Totally Wired Festival Chicago – this was their second performance. The Mentally Ill have played a few shows each year since their reunion gigs.

== Members ==
- Sado Marquis (Larry Gutkin) – Lead Vocals & Lyricist
- Skitz Phrenic (Rob Herman) – Bass, Saxophone
- Hans Dolittle (Richard Shleicher) – Guitar
- Klaus Trofobic (Jon Ledwith) – Guitar
- Special Ed (Richard Blatt) – Drums
- Art MacQuilkin – Vocals on Sex Cells
- Reggie Mars – Various instruments on Sex Cells

== Releases ==
- Gacy's Place 7" (Autistic Records, 1979) – 300 pressed
- Sex Cells 7" (Autistic Records & Snat 5 Records (1982)
- Strike the Bottom Red (1999)
  - Recorded by Steve Albini
  - Not officially distributed
- Gacy's Place: The Undiscovered Corpses CD (Alternative Tentacles, 2004)
- Strike the Bottom Red (Reissue, First pressing on vinyl Almost Ready Records, 2015)
  - Recorded by Steve Albini
- Gacy's Place 7" (Almost Ready Records Reissue, 2017)
- Gacy's Place (Starbeat Session) (Almost Ready Records, 2020)
- Gacy's Place (Limited Edition Cassette) (Almost Ready Records, 2021)

== Sources ==
- Alternative Tentacles Bio
- Gacy's Place: The Undiscovered Corpses page on AT
- KBD Records entry on Sex Cells with mp3s
- The Beat Kitchen
