= The Worldhood of the World (As Such) =

Studio album by Nomeansno
- Released: October 10, 1995
- Recorded: 1995
- Genre: Punk rock
- Length: 51:19
- Label: Alternative Tentacles
- Producer: Nomeansno

Nomeansno chronology
Why Do They Call Me Mr. Happy? (1993)	The Worldhood of the World (As Such) (1995)	Dance of the Headless Bourgeoisie (1998)

The Worldhood of the World (As Such) is the seventh studio album by Canadian punk rock band Nomeansno, released in 1995. It is the first record of the group's to feature guitarist Tom Holliston and the band's only record as a quartet rather than a duo or trio. "State of Grace" was originally a song from Rob Wright's solo project, Mr. Wrong.

The title is a reference to the existential philosophy of Martin Heidegger (see Heidegger's 1927 book Being and Time, part 1 division 1 chapter 3).

== Critical reception ==
Professional ratings
Review scores
Source	Rating
AllMusic	4/5 stars
The Austin Chronicle	3.5/5 stars
The Encyclopedia of Popular Music	3/5 stars

Trouser Press wrote: "Sounding thuggishly comfortable in their sonic element, the Wrights turn outward again, addressing violence ('I’ve Got a Gun'), social Darwinism ('Predators') and life’s castoffs ('Victim’s Choice,' 'He Learned How to Bleed') with surprising compassion and concerted musicianship cranked up high and hard." The Quietus called the album "comparatively straight (yet still entirely righteous) punk." SF Weekly wrote that "the music is less technically ambitious than it's been on previous efforts, but that only serves to make the hooks and lyrical barbs that accompanies it that much sharper."

== Track listing ==
1. "Joy" – 1:40
2. "Humans" – 4:11
3. "Angel or Devil" – 3:43
4. "He Learned How to Bleed" – 3:42
5. "I've Got a Gun" – 2:26
6. "My Politics" – 5:57
7. "Lost" – 5:10
8. "Predators" – 5:09
9. "Wiggly Worm" – 2:14
10. "Tuck It Away" – 2:10
11. "Victim's Choice" – 3:25
12. "State of Grace" – 5:56
13. "The Jungle" – 6:39

Note: the original LP edition, LP reissue (Wrong 39), and iTunes release omit the track "Lost."

== Personnel ==
- Bill Baker – artwork
- Brian (Who) Else – engineering
- Tom Holliston – guitar, vocals
- John Wright – vocals, drums, keyboards
- Rob Wright – vocals, bass
- Ken Kempster – drums
