= Two Pin Din =

Two-piece indie rock band

- Origin: Amsterdam, Netherlands
- Genres: Indie rock
- Years active: 2005–present
- Members: Andy Kerr; Wilf Plum
- Website: www.twopindin.com

Two Pin Din are a two-piece indie rock band based in the Netherlands and Belgium, formed in 2005 by musicians Andy Kerr and Wilf Plum, formerly of the bands Nomeansno and Dog Faced Hermans, respectively.

The group features both musicians singing and playing guitar, lacking a traditional rock band rhythm section of bass guitar and drums.

They released their debut album, In Case of Fire Break Glass, in 2008. In 2014, Two Pin Din put out a four song extended play featuring the words and vocals of G.W. Sok.

== Discography ==
- In Case of Fire Break Glass CD (2008)
- Gifts, Milk and Things EP Double 7" vinyl with G.W. Sok (2014)
