= Nomeansno =

Canadian rock band

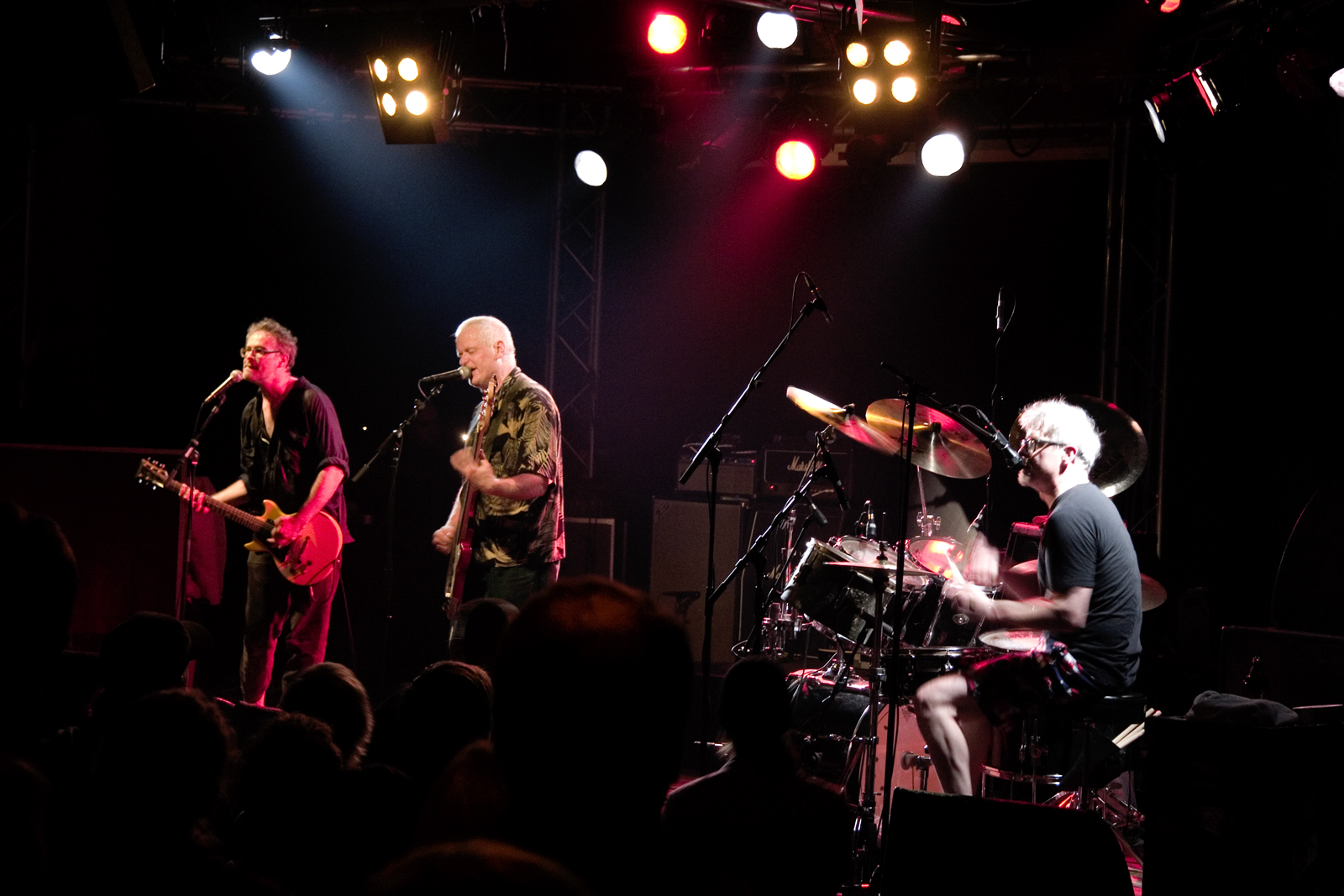
- Nomeansno live in Tampere, Finland, in 2007

Background information
- Origin: Victoria, British Columbia, Canada
- Genres: Punk rock; punk jazz; post-hardcore; hardcore punk; noise rock
- Years active: 1979–2016
- Labels: Wrong, Alternative Tentacles, AntAcidAudio, Southern, Psyche Industry Records, Cargo Records
- Past members: Rob Wright; John Wright; Andy Kerr; Tom Holliston; Ken Kempster

Nomeansno (sometimes stylized as NoMeansNo or spelled No Means No) was a Canadian punk rock band formed in Victoria, British Columbia, and later relocated to Vancouver. They released 11 albums, including a collaborative album with Jello Biafra, and numerous EPs and singles. Critic Martin Popoff described their music as "the mightiest merger between the hateful aggression of punk and the discipline of heavy metal." Nomeansno's distinct hardcore punk sound, complex instrumentation, and dark, "savagely intelligent" lyrics inspired subsequent musicians. They were a formative influence on punk jazz, post-hardcore, math rock, and emo.

Formed in 1979 by brothers Rob and John Wright, they began as a two-piece punk band influenced by jazz and progressive rock. They self-released their debut Mama LP in 1982, added guitarist Andy Kerr the following year, and signed with Alternative Tentacles. Kerr departed in late 1991 after five LPs with the band, and the group returned to its two-piece formation for the Why Do They Call Me Mr. Happy? album.

Guitarist Tom Holliston, and briefly second drummer Ken Kempster, joined in 1993. After three further LPs, they left Alternative Tentacles and issued their final album, All Roads Lead to Ausfahrt, in 2006. The Western Canadian Music Hall of Fame inducted them in 2015, and they retired the following year.

== History ==
=== Early years as two-piece and Mama (1979–1982) ===
In 1979 at age 25, Rob Wright returned to his family's home in Victoria after studying in Calgary. John, Rob's younger brother by eight years, played drums in the school jazz band, and the two were inspired to play punk rock after seeing D.O.A. perform at the University of Victoria. They began rehearsing in their parents' basement, and took the name Nomeansno from an anti-date rape slogan on a graffitied wall. They also briefly gigged as the rhythm section for local cover band Castle.

Nomeansno recorded its earliest material in the months that followed on a TASCAM four-track recorder, with Rob playing electric guitar and bass, John playing keyboards and drums, and both brothers singing. Some of these recordings were issued as their first two self-released 7"s, the "Look, Here Come the Wormies / SS Social Service" single (a 1980 split with Mass Appeal, whose recording lineup featured both Wright Brothers), and the Betrayal, Fear, Anger, Hatred EP of 1981.

The brothers began performing live as a bass-and-drums duo in 1981. John later reflected on their sound's development:

...without a guitar player you can't rely on the standard hooks that punk rock and rock n' roll in general relies on. The guitar player – the guitar god quote unquote – was such a focus for so long that by the nature of not having a guitar player, the bass and the drums have to do a lot more. It also makes the vocals more important, or at least it makes a lot more room for the vocals. You don't have guitar solos, you don't have the wash of high end. And the things you do on the drums are different, if you just did a straight four beat on the drums it would get kinda dull after a while. It isn't as though bass guitar hasn't been a prominent instrument at times in other bands but it made us approach things differently, our song structure couldn't just be verse-chorus-verse. It had everything to do with how our sound got off to a unique start.

They self-released the Mama LP in a limited pressing in 1982. Writing for Trouser Press, critic Ira Robbins described Mama and the early 7"s as "Devo on a jazz trip, Motörhead after art school, or Wire on psychotic steroids." John also joined the Victoria punk band the Infamous Scientists.

=== You Kill Me and Small Parts Isolated and Destroyed (1983–1989) ===
The Infamous Scientists disbanded in 1983, and their guitarist and vocalist Andy Kerr joined Nomeansno several months later. Initially a guest and later full member, Kerr played with a buzz-saw guitar tone via a Fender Bassman amplifier and P.A. speaker. Nomeansno became a fixture in the British Columbia punk scene despite not conforming to the punk sound. The You Kill Me EP in 1985 on Undergrowth Records contained experimental songs like "Body Bag" and a cover of "Manic Depression" by Jimi Hendrix. The three also began performing Ramones covers and more traditional punk music as the Hanson Brothers, a side project that would later receive more attention.

Issued initially by Montreal's Psyche Industry label, the band released Sex Mad, their second LP and first with Kerr. The album further expanded the band's experimental and progressive punk sound, yielding the single "Dad". The song was a minor college radio hit, which AllMusic reviewer Adam Bregman called "a bit chilling, even though it's spit out at slam-pit's pace". Kerr, the song's lead vocalist, increasingly became responsible for lead vocals as Rob Wright suffered from nodules on his vocal cords.

They signed with seminal punk label Alternative Tentacles, run by Jello Biafra of the Dead Kennedys. This, along with frequent touring in North America and Europe, helped the band gain a larger audience. In 1988, the group issued two releases recorded with producer Cecil English: The Day Everything Became Nothing EP and the Small Parts Isolated and Destroyed album. Alternative Tentacles compiled the two together on a single CD, The Day Everything Became Isolated and Destroyed. AllMusic reviewer Sean Carruthers called the experimental recordings "less aggressive" than, but nonetheless worthy of, the band's previous efforts.

=== Wrong, 0 + 2 = 1, and Why Do They Call Me Mr. Happy? (1989–1993) ===
The band's logo from Wrong

Rob Wright's vocal cords began to heal, and he resumed acting as lead vocalist. In 1989, they issued their fourth album, Wrong, to wide critical acclaim. For AllMusic, Carruthers wrote that "[t]he playing is incredibly skilled;" critic Martin Popoff in writing for The Collector's Guide to Heavy Metal called Wrong the band's best album and rated the album 10 out of 10 points. The band's extensive touring in support of the record is documented on the Live + Cuddly album, recorded in Holland in 1990. John later reported that, circa 1990, the band became profitable enough that "we didn't have to have day jobs."

The band released a collaborative LP with Biafra, The Sky Is Falling and I Want My Mommy, in 1991. Shortly thereafter, they issued 0 + 2 = 1, their fifth album and final release with Kerr. In a mixed review, AllMusic critic Adam Bregman praised 0 + 2 = 1 for its finer moments, but was concerned about its length and ponderousness.

Kerr departed after touring in support of the record and emigrated to the Netherlands. He went on to release two LPs with Hissanol, a collaboration with Scott Henderson of Shovlhed. He subsequently released a solo album in 1997 before forming the duo Two Pin Din with Wilf Plum of Dog Faced Hermans in 2005.

The Wright brothers focused on their side project, the Hanson Brothers. Dressing as a group of Canadian ice hockey players and fans, they derived the band's name and personae from characters in the 1977 George Roy Hill film Slap Shot starring Paul Newman. John acted as lead vocalist, and guitarist Tom Holliston of the Showbusiness Giants joined. With encouragement from Alternative Tentacles, the Hanson Brothers issued Gross Misconduct in 1992. Drummer Ken Jensen of D.O.A. completed the live lineup.

Rob began performing solo as Mr. Wrong, appearing as a character dressed as an authoritarian priest. John became a member of D.O.A. for several years. The brothers also continued to expand Wrong Records, their own imprint.

In 1993, the brothers assembled material for a sixth Nomeansno LP and recorded Why Do They Call Me Mr. Happy? as a duo. AllMusic critic Ned Raggett later praised the album's balance, arguing that it reached dark and sinister depths while also exhibiting subtler and more introspective moments. The Wrights also released the collection Mr. Right & Mr. Wrong: One Down & Two to Go, comprising early demos, studio outtakes, and additional material.

=== Worldhood of the World (As Such) and Dance of the Headless Bourgeoisie (1993–1999) ===
Holliston joined Nomeansno for touring in support of Why Do They Call Me Mr. Happy?, and second drummer Ken Kempster joined later in 1993 to complete their first four-piece lineup. Kempster went on to tour sporadically with Nomeansno over the next four years.

Holliston and Kempster debuted on The Worldhood of the World (As Such), released in 1995. With a title from philosopher Martin Heidegger's Being and Time, the album featured simpler and more melodic songs than its predecessors while nonetheless retaining the band's "taste for blood and gristle." After focusing briefly on the Hanson Brothers and releasing the LP Sudden Death, Nomeansno followed with the EPs Would We Be Alive? and In the Fishtank 1, each featuring a cover of "Would We Be Alive?" by the Residents.

They issued their eighth studio album, the double LP Dance of the Headless Bourgeoisie, in 1998. The album featured some of their longest songs and received mixed but generally positive reviews. In a retrospective review, AllMusic critic Tom Schulte praised the album in its experimental tone as "dark and unforgettable, poignant and cutting." A critic writing for The A.V. Club, however, dismissed the album as "dull, meandering punk" and likened the band pejoratively to Rush.

=== One and All Roads Lead to Ausfahrt (2000–2006) ===
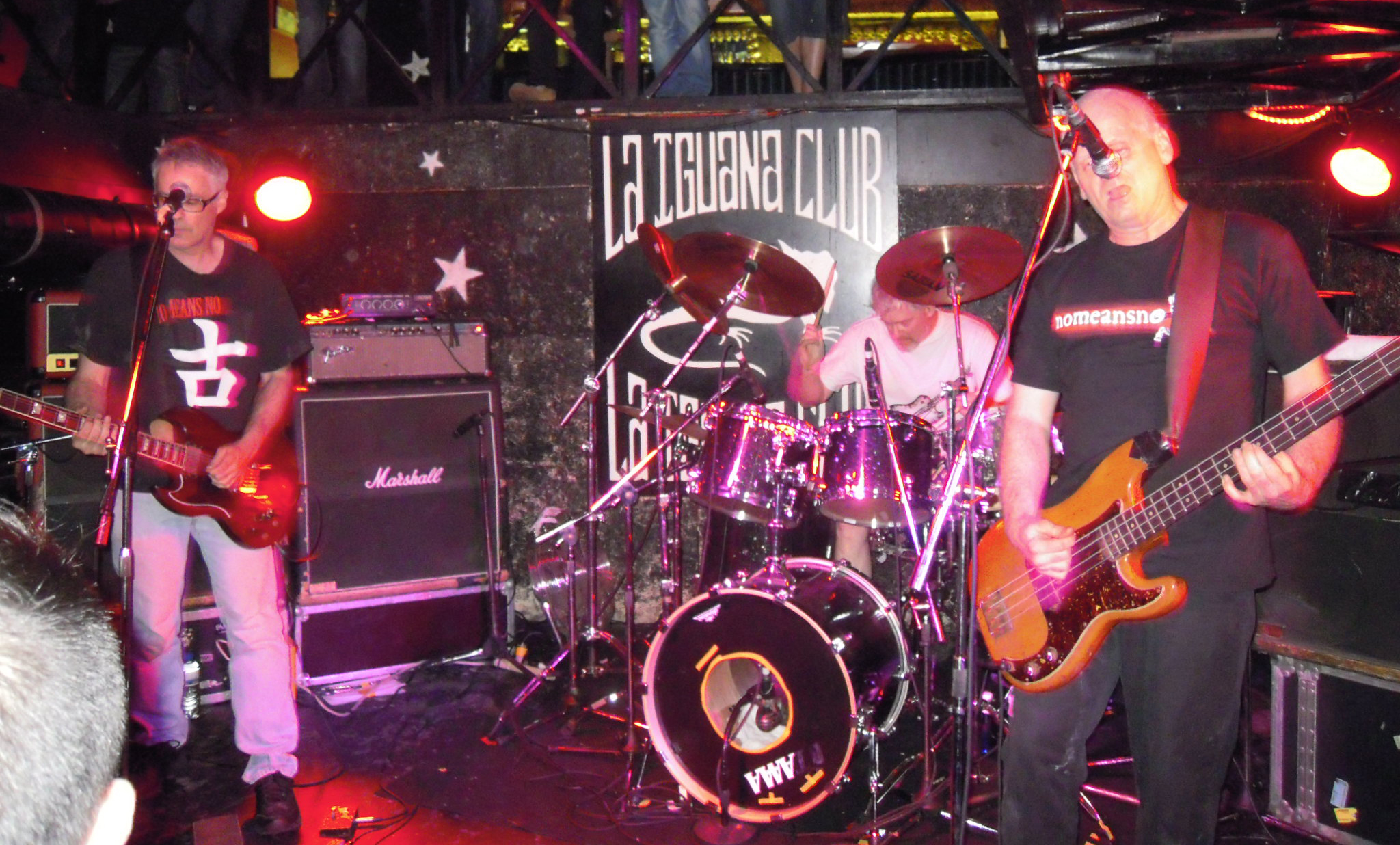
The band was a three-piece featuring (from left to right) Tom Holliston, John Wright, and Rob Wright in its final two decades.

The band issued its final Alternative Tentacles album, One, in 2000. Featuring a slow stoner rock cover of the Ramones's "Beat on the Brat" and a fifteen-minute version of Miles Davis's "Bitches Brew" with electric piano and congas, the album was well received. AllMusic's Schulte assessed the album as "intense and heavy collegiate punk" as praised it as the band's finest effort since Wrong. Three outtakes from the album were also issued as the Generic Shame EP on Wrong.

The band left Alternative Tentacles in 2002, mainly due to concerns about record distribution in Europe where their most devoted fan base lived. They began slowly reissuing their back catalogue through Wrong and distributors Southern Records. With new drummer Ernie Hawkins, the Hanson Brothers released their third album, My Game, later that year. Nomeansno continued touring extensively, but ultimately took six years to release their next album. In the meantime, they issued the best-of compilation The People's Choice.

Their tenth studio album, All Roads Lead to Ausfahrt, was released on August 22, 2006 by AntAcidAudio in the United States and Southern Records in Europe. AllMusic critic Jo-Ann Greene praised the album's exhausting diversity as befitting of the band's legacy and career-spanning accomplishments. Greene wrote that with the record, Nomeansno travel "yet again through the undergrowth and underbelly of the rock realm, and with all the piss and vinegar that they started out with a quarter century ago."

=== Later years and retirement (2007–2016) ===
The band toured frequently in the years that followed, but ceased recording albums. Fang drummer Mike Branum joined the Hanson Brothers in 2008. In 2010, Nomeansno digitally released outtakes and demos from the 0 + 2 = 1 sessions as 0 + 2 = 1 ½. They next released two four-track EPs, Tour EP 1 (alternatively known as Old) and Tour EP 2 (alternatively Jubilation). They continued performing live through 2013, and toured as the Hanson Brothers in the following year with Byron Slack on drums going on hiatus.

Holliston continued to perform with the Showbusiness Giants and release solo albums, while John Wright began working as musical director for the all-robot rock band Compressorhead. In 2015, Nomeansno was inducted into the Western Canadian Music Hall of Fame. They played an acoustic set at the awards ceremony, and a Ramones cover set (with Slack on drums) on New Year's Eve, which became their final public appearances. Holliston announced his departure from the band in August 2016. On September 24, John Wright announced the band's official retirement.

=== Post-retirement ===
Wrong was named the public vote winner of the Polaris Heritage Prize at the 2021 Polaris Music Prize. In December 2023, PM Press released the band's authorized biography, NoMeansNo: From Obscurity to Oblivion: An Oral History, written by radio host Jason Lamb. The book features interviews with all five band members, as well as friends, family, fellow musicians, and fans.

In 2023 John Wright's solo project Dead Bob issued the album Life Like and toured in its support with a live band featuring Ford Pier and other musicians.

In 2024, Nomeansno returned to Alternative Tentacles for distribution of their recording, along with remastered editions of Wrong and the 1987 single "Dad/Revenge".

== Band members ==
- Rob Wright – bass, vocals, guitar (1979–2016)
- John Wright – drums, vocals, keyboards (1979–2016)
- Andy Kerr – guitar, vocals, bass (1982–1991)
- Tom Holliston – guitar, vocals (1993–2016)
- Ken Kempster – drums (1993–1997)

== Discography ==
=== Studio albums ===
- Mama (1982)
- Sex Mad (1986)
- Small Parts Isolated and Destroyed (1988)
- Wrong (1989)
- 0 + 2 = 1 (1991)
- Why Do They Call Me Mr. Happy? (1993)
- The Worldhood of the World (As Such) (1995)
- Dance of the Headless Bourgeoisie (1998)
- One (2000)
- All Roads Lead to Ausfahrt (2006)

=== Collaborative albums ===
- The Sky Is Falling and I Want My Mommy (with Jello Biafra) (1991)

=== Live albums ===
- Live + Cuddly (1991)

=== EPs ===
- Betrayal, Fear, Anger, Hatred (1981)
- You Kill Me (1985)
- The Day Everything Became Nothing (1988)
- The Power of Positive Thinking (1990)
- Would We Be Alive? (1996)
- In the Fishtank 1 (1996)
- Generic Shame (2001)
- Tour EP 1 (2010)
- Tour EP 2 (2010)
- Butchering The Sacred Cows (2012)

=== Singles ===
- "Look, Here Come the Wormies / SS Social Service" (split with Mass Appeal) (1980)
- "Dad/Revenge" (1987)
- "Oh, Canaduh" (1991)

=== Compilations ===
- The Day Everything Became Isolated and Destroyed (1988)
- Sex Mad/You Kill Me (1991)
- Mr. Right & Mr. Wrong: One Down & Two to Go (1994)
- The People's Choice (2004)
- 0 + 2 = 1 ½ (2010)

=== Bootlegs ===
- Live at the Paradiso Amsterdam – bootleg – VPRO Radio station recording (1988)
- Live in Warsaw – bootleg cassette (1990)
- Sasquatch – The Man, The Myth, The Compilation – includes cover tracks "I Don't Care" and "Glad All Over" (1991)
- Where are they now file - live compilation, includes "I Want it All" (1991)
- The Infamous Scientist 45" – bootleg 7" (1993)
- Leave the Seaside – live bootleg 7" (1994)

=== Compilation appearances ===
- It Came from the Pit (1986)
- Random Thought: A Victoria Sampler (Volumes 1 & 2) – includes, "Getting Colder", "Burn" and "Love Thang" (1986)
- Oops! Wrong Stereotype (Alternative Tentacles compilation) (1988)
- Terminal City Ricochet (soundtrack Terminal City Ricochet movie) (1990)
- Clam Chowder & Ice Vs. Big Macs and Bombers (1992)
- Virus 100 (a cappella version of Dead Kennedys song, "Forward to Death") (1992)
- Over a Century of Vivisection and Anti-Vivisection (How Much Longer?) – Includes the 1981 Mama outtake, "No Means No" (1992)
- The Making of Allied One Two Three (1995)
- Basement Tapes: A KSPC Compilation of Live Recordings – includes "I Don't Want To Go Down To The Basement" (1995)
- Short Music for Short People (1999)
- Sex With Nothing (2002)
- Fubar: The Album (2002)
- All Your Ears Can Hear (2007)

== Videography ==
- Would We Be...Live? (Live footage of Nomeansno and the Hanson Brothers, filmed in London, on DVD) (2004)
- We Played At Squats (Portrait about Nomeansno and the Hanson Brothers, produced in Austria, on DVD) (2014)

== See also ==
- List of bands from Canada
