= Manic Depression (song) =

1967 song by Jimi Hendrix

Song by the Jimi Hendrix Experience

from the album Are You Experienced
- Released: May 12, 1967 (UK); August 23, 1967 (US)
- Recorded: March 29, 1967
- Studio: De Lane Lea, London
- Genre: Jazz rock
- Length: 3:30
- Label: Track (UK); Reprise (US)
- Songwriter: Jimi Hendrix
- Producer: Chas Chandler

"Manic Depression" is a song written by Jimi Hendrix and recorded by the Jimi Hendrix Experience in 1967.

== Background ==
Music critic William Ruhlmann describes the lyrics as "more an expression of romantic frustration than the clinical definition of manic depression."

The song is performed in an uptempo compound triple metre. It also features Mitch Mitchell's jazz-influenced drumming and a parallel guitar and bass line.

== Release and covers ==
"Manic Depression" is included on the Experience's debut album, Are You Experienced (1967). Recordings of live performances have been released on BBC Sessions (1998) and Winterland (2011). Ruhlmann notes renditions by Seal with Jeff Beck on Stone Free: A Tribute to Jimi Hendrix (1993) and King's X on Dogman (1994).

It has been covered many times:

- The Canadian band Nomeansno included a cover of the song on their EP You Kill Me. A live version is also featured on the bootleg Live in Warsaw.
- D.C. hardcore band Beefeater included the song, credited as "Manic D.", on their 1985 debut album, Plays for Lovers.
- Ace Frehley covered the song on his album Origins Vol. 2.
- Brooklyn-based crossover thrash band Carnivore covered the song on their 1987 album Retaliation.
- Hollywood Vampires covered the song on their eponymous debut album.
- Yngwie Malmsteen covered the song on his tribute album Inspiration.
