= The Hanson Brothers (band) =

Canadian band

- Origin: Victoria, British Columbia, Canada
- Genres: Punk rock, pop punk
- Years active: 1984–2016
- Labels: Alternative Tentacles, Wrong Records, Southern, Konkurrent, Mint, Virgin
- Past members: John Wright; Rob Wright; Andy Kerr; Tom Holliston; Ken Jensen; Ken Kempster; Ernie Hawkins; Mike Branum; Byron Slack
- Website: nomeanswhatever.com

The Hanson Brothers were a Canadian punk rock band formed in 1984 in Victoria, British Columbia, and later based in Vancouver, British Columbia. The group included John and Rob Wright and Tom Holliston, all members of the punk rock band Nomeansno. The Hanson Brothers' band name references characters in the cult ice hockey film Slap Shot.

== History ==
From 1984 to 1989, the Wright brothers (John on drums and Rob on bass guitar) and original NoMeansNo guitarist Andy Kerr performed Ramones cover sets sporadically under the name The Hanson Brothers. The Hanson Brothers later began to write "their own Ramones songs" i.e., original songs in the fast, melodic style of the Ramones. At this time John Wright played drums and the three members shared lead vocal duties. Examples of songs from this era are "Ya Little Creep" and "Bad," two Kerr-era NoMeansNo songs with songwriting credited to the Hanson Brothers; the former appears on the 1991 compilation Clam Chowder and Ice Vs. Big Macs and Bombers, and the latter on The Sky Is Falling and I Want My Mommy, a collaborative LP with Jello Biafra.

The Wrights began working with guitarist Tom Holliston as the Hanson Brothers in 1989. The earliest sessions from this time still featured John Wright on drums; however, Ken Jensen of D.O.A. soon joined as the drummer and John Wright devoted himself to the lead vocals. After releasing a debut 7-inch, the band recorded their first album, Gross Misconduct, in 1992. The album featured art spoofing the cover of the Ramones' Road to Ruin.

Jensen died in a house fire in 1995. Ken Kempster (member of, among many other groups, the Showbusiness Giants) became the group's next drummer, referred to as "Kenny Jr" Hanson. This lineup released the group's second record, Sudden Death, through a subsidiary of Virgin Records. The cover spoofed D.O.A.'s "The Prisoner" single cover.

In 2000, the songs "Rink Rat", "Third Man In", "Stick Boy", and "Danielle", were featured in the NHL Rock The Rink game for the Sony PlayStation. Also in 2000, John Wright, in his Johnny Hanson character, recorded an instructional video regarding homebrewing beer. Wright also compiled and released two compilations of hockey-themed songs called Puck Rock Volumes I and II.

Kempster left the group in 2001, and Ernie Hawkins joined for touring behind the group's third record, My Game. The cover parodied Black Flag's My War. In April 2006, the band went on a tour of Canada. Hawkins appears on the group's 2008 live album It's a Living, whose cover parodies the Ramones' It's Alive. Mike Branum, from The Freak Accident, debuted as the group's drummer for their 2008 tour. Byron Slack replaced Branum in 2014.

Nomeansno broke up in 2016, also putting an end to the Hanson Brothers.

== Members ==
- Johnny Hanson (John Wright) – lead vocals (1984–2016), drums (1984–1991)
- Robbie Hanson (Rob Wright) – bass guitar (1984–2016)
- Andy Kerr – guitar, vocals (1984–1989)
- Tommy Hanson (Tom Holliston) – guitar, vocals (1989–2016)
- Kenny Hanson (Ken Jensen) – drums (1991–1995)
- Kenny Hanson II (Ken Kempster) – drums (1995–2001)
- Ernie Hanson (Ernie Hawkins) – drums (2001–2006)
- Mikey Hanson (Mike Branum) – drums (2008–2013)
- Ronnie Hanson (Byron Slack) – drums (2014–2016)

== Discography ==
=== Full-length albums ===
- Gross Misconduct – 1992
- Sudden Death – 1996
- My Game – 2002
- It's a Living (live) – 2008

=== EPs and singles ===
- Brad (7-inch single) – 1992
- The Hockey Song (split 7-inch single with D.O.A.) – 1996
- Brad (EP re-release of Brad single with bonus tracks) – 2003

Additionally, there are numerous compilation albums featuring Hanson Brothers tracks.
