= Tom Holliston =

Canadian punk rock musician (born 1960)

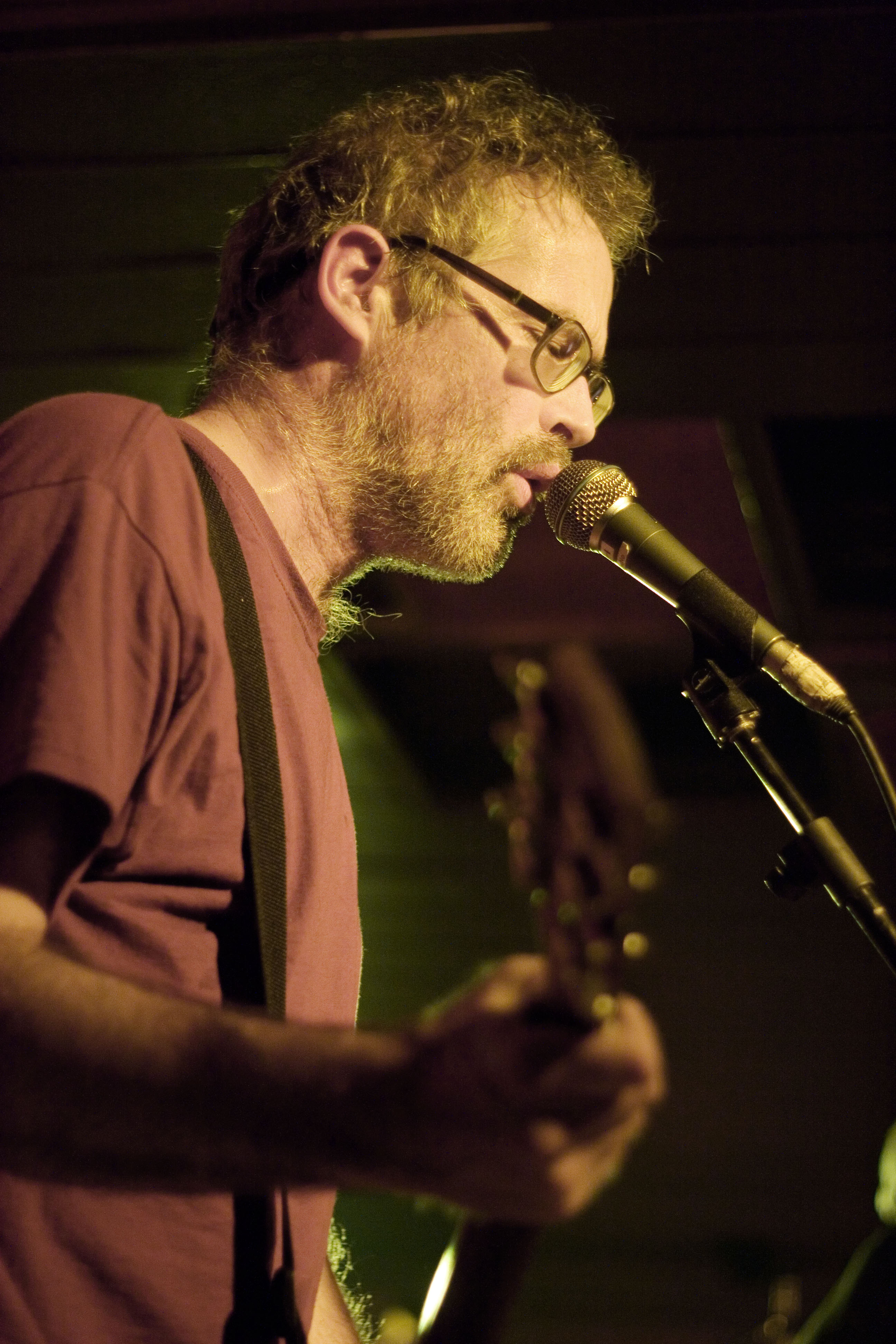

Background information
- Born: April 21, 1960 (age 66); Victoria, British Columbia, Canada
- Genres: Punk, progressive rock, punk jazz
- Occupations: Musician, songwriter, producer
- Instruments: Vocals, guitar, bass guitar
- Years active: 1978–present
- Labels: Alternative Tentacles, Wrong Records, Southern Records

Tom Holliston (born April 21, 1960) is a Canadian punk rock musician. Primarily associated with the bands Nomeansno and The Hanson Brothers, he also leads the side project Showbusiness Giants, and has released four solo records since 2002.

Showbusiness Giants, a rotating collective of musicians which included Scott Henderson, John Wright, Andy Kerr, Carolyn Mark, Ken Kempster, Keith Rose, and Ford Pier, became best known for the single "I've Got a Crush on Wendy Mesley", from the album Let's Have a Talk With the Dead, which was a hit on Canada's campus radio charts in 1995.

For touring in support of Why Do They Call Me Mr. Happy?, Nomeansno hired Holliston to replace Andy Kerr. Holliston went on to become their full-time guitarist. The first Nomeansno album to feature Holliston was The Worldhood of the World (As Such), released in 1995. Holliston announced his departure from the band in August 2016. One month later, on September 24, John Wright announced the band's official retirement.

== Discography ==
=== Solo ===
- Tom Holliston and His Opportunists (2002)
- I Want You To Twist With Me (2003)
- Boy in Tub; Rabbit (2005)
- Rotherhithe (2011)

=== with Showbusiness Giants ===
- Gold Love (1988)
- The Benevolent Horn (1989)
- I Thought It Was a Fig (1991)
- Maybe It's Just Me (1991)
- Let's Have a Talk With the Dead (1995)
- Will There Be Corn? (1997)
- Self-Aggrandizement Keeps Us Going (2000)

=== with Nomeansno ===
- The Worldhood of the World (As Such) (1995)
- Would We Be Alive? (1996)
- In the Fishtank 1 (1996)
- Dance of the Headless Bourgeoisie (1998)
- One (2000)
- Generic Shame (2001)
- All Roads Lead to Ausfahrt (2006)
- Tour EP 1 (2010)
- Tour EP 2 (2010)
