= Wrong (album) =

Studio album by Nomeansno
- Released: Autumn 1989
- Recorded: Summer 1989
- Studios: Profile Sound Studios, Vancouver, British Columbia, Canada
- Genres: Post-hardcore; jazzcore
- Length: 39:54
- Label: Alternative Tentacles

Nomeansno chronology
Small Parts Isolated and Destroyed (1988)	Wrong (1989)	Live + Cuddly (1991)

Professional ratings
Review scores
Source	Rating
Allmusic	4.5/5 stars
Rolling Stone	(NR)

Wrong is the fourth full-length album by Canadian punk rock band Nomeansno. It was released in 1989 through Alternative Tentacles.

== Overview ==
Wrong was described by drummer John Wright as the band's "most popular album by a country mile". When asked to speculate as to the reasons why Wrong enjoyed such relative success, John Wright attributed it to the mainstream success of Nirvana and the rising popularity of alternative music:

The kind of music we were playing, and then Nirvana before they got popular, and that kind of alternative...Punk rock was getting to that point where a lot of bands were just starting to get into that commercial breakthrough, and when Nirvana did, well of course that spelled the end of it all. But it sort of simmered to that point, and then people wanted to hear bands like Nirvana, which weren't hardcore, not pop or rock, it was sort of more heartfelt music, and we were sort of caught up in that...In Europe especially, the music scene was just exploding. We completely attribute all of our success to going and playing in Europe. That's where all the buzz about us came from. We were touring throughout the States in the mid-80s, and we'd get a little bit of audience here and there, but after a couple of years in Europe, we started doing some big shows there, and all of a sudden, people in the States were coming out to our shows. And we went from getting paid $200 to getting paid $1000. It was just like that. You had to have the buzz, and then it all just kind of blew up. Every major label tried to sign every band, and then it became no longer an alternative, it sort of became co-opted by the mainstream and people moved on to hip hop and dub step and then everyone got sick of rock and roll and went to raves.

== Reception ==
The Collector's Guide to Heavy Metal called it the band's best album, and rated the album as a 10 out of 10, stating, "Wrong was the mightiest merger between the hateful aggression of punk and the discipline of heavy metal." Sean Carruthers, critic for Allmusic, declared that the album was the band's masterpiece, and features "some of the most complex instrumentation you're ever likely to find in good ol' punk rawk."

In 2021, the album was named the public vote winner of the Polaris Heritage Prize at the 2021 Polaris Music Prize.

== Track listing ==
Side one

1. "It's Catching Up" – 3:29
2. "The Tower" – 5:11
3. "Brainless Wonder" – 1:34
4. "Tired of Waiting" – 1:47
5. "Stocktaking" – 3:05
6. "The End of All Things" – 5:10

Side two

1. "Big Dick" – 3:15
2. "Two Lips, Two Lungs and One Tongue" – 1:46
3. "Rags and Bones" – 5:05
4. "Oh No! Bruno!" – 3:06
5. "All Lies" – 6:27

=== CD reissue bonus tracks ===
12. "Life in Hell" – 3:54
13. "I Am Wrong" – 7:01

=== 2005 CD reissue bonus tracks ===
14. "State of Grace" – 5:29
15. "End of the World" – 3:28

== Personnel ==
- Rob Wright – bass, guitar, and vocals
- John Wright – drums, percussion, and vocals
- Andy Kerr (credited as "None of your fucking business") – guitar, bass, and vocals
- Guests on "The End of All Things" – Mark Critchley (orchestra bells), Danielle Gagnier (vocals)
- Produced by Nomeansno, Cecil English and Craig Bougie. Recorded at Profile Studios, Vancouver, British Columbia, Canada, summer 1989
