= Ken Kempster =

Canadian musician (born 1975)

- Born: September 18, 1975 (age 50); Halifax, Nova Scotia, Canada
- Genres: Punk rock, pop punk
- Occupation: Musician
- Instrument: drums
- Years active: 199?–present
- Labels: Alternative Tentacles, Wrong Records

Ken Kempster (born September 18, 1975) is a Canadian musician.

Kempster has played drums in the Canadian punk rock bands wedontdomuch, Shovlhead, Swell Prod., The Showbusiness Giants (1993–1997), The Hanson Brothers (1993–1997), and NoMeansNo (1993–1997, serving as second drummer for live performances and their seventh full-length album The Worldhood of the World (As Such).)
