= Andy Kerr (musician) =

- Origin: Victoria, British Columbia, Canada
- Genres: Punk rock, progressive punk, punk jazz, pop punk, post-punk
- Occupations: Musician, songwriter
- Instruments: Vocals, guitar, bass guitar
- Years active: 1979 – present
- Labels: Alternative Tentacles, Wrong Records, Southern Records

Andy Kerr is a Canadian-born musician, originally from British Columbia and currently residing in Amsterdam, the Netherlands. Kerr is best known as the guitarist, frequent vocalist, and co-songwriter in the progressive punk rock/punk jazz band NoMeansNo between 1983 and 1992. He has also recorded and performed as a solo artist, and his current group is Two Pin Din.

== History ==
Kerr initially appeared on the Victoria, British Columbia punk rock scene in the late 1970s as the singer and guitarist in the punk rock groups Dioxyn and The Infamous Scientists. Founded in 1979, the latter group released two EPs prior to disbanding in 1982. The final lineup of this group included NoMeansNo drummer John Wright.

Kerr went on to join NoMeansNo as guitarist and vocalist in 1983 after founding members Wright and his brother Rob conducted the group as a sporadically active two-piece for four years. His unique sound and playing style added a strong complementary quality to the group. Running a Fender Bassman amplifier through a P.A. speaker, he attained a relentlessly jagged guitar tone quite suited to heavy dynamics of the Wright brothers' rhythm section. Rob Wright, the group's primary vocalist through much of its career, suffered from nodules on his vocal cords during much of the late 1980s, leaving Kerr temporarily responsible for the bulk of the vocal duties, notably on the Small Parts Isolated and Destroyed record. By the time of the Wrong album of 1989, Wright had undergone successful throat surgery and reclaimed the slight majority of the band's lead vocal parts. Kerr used pseudonyms and nameless references to himself in album liner notes. NoMeansNo enjoyed modest international success among critics and fans during this time. During a nine-year stint in the band, he played on four studio LPs, three EPs, a live record, and a collaborative LP with singer Jello Biafra, prior to emigrating to the Netherlands in 1992 and leaving the group.

Kerr's first project after leaving Canada found him collaborating with Canadian musician Scott Henderson (of Shovlhed and the Showbusiness Giants, among other groups) in an unorthodox manner – via airmail. The pair would individually experiment with home recordings and mail each other cassette tapes of their efforts for the other to elaborate upon. Calling themselves Hissanol, the experimental group released two full-length albums on the Alternative Tentacles label, with whom NoMeansNo had previously worked.

In 1997, Kerr released a solo record called Once Bitten, Twice Removed. This album, initially on cassette only prior to being re-released on CD-R in 2000, found him experimenting with a number of more traditional musical styles, including country, folk, pop, and rockabilly, as well as more familiar turns towards punk rock and pop punk.

Currently, Kerr is working with former Dog Faced Hermans drummer Wilf Plum in a two-piece guitar rock project called Two Pin Din. The group released their debut record, In Case of Fire Break Glass in 2008.

Kerr was, at different times, also briefly involved with NoMeansNo-related projects the Hanson Brothers and the Showbusiness Giants in the 1980s and early 1990s. In the latter group, he performed on bass guitar. Via his pseudonyms, he is credited as playing "some bass" on several NoMeansNo records as well.

== Discography ==
=== Full-length albums ===
- NoMeansNo – Sex Mad (1986)
- NoMeansNo – Small Parts Isolated and Destroyed (1988)
- NoMeansNo – Wrong (1989)
- Jello Biafra and NoMeansNo – The Sky is Falling and I Want My Mommy (1991)
- NoMeansNo – Live + Cuddly (1991)
- Showbusiness Giants – I Thought It Was a Fig (1991)
- Showbusiness Giants – Maybe It's Just Me (1991)
- NoMeansNo – 0 + 2 = 1 (1991)
- Hissanol – 4th & Back (1995)
- Andy Kerr – Once Bitten, Twice Removed (1997)
- Hissanol – The Making of Him (1998)
- Two Pin Din – In Case of Fire Break Glass (2008)

=== EPs and singles ===
- Infamous Scientists – Noise 'n' Rhythm 7" (1981)
- Infamous Scientists – Trouble 12" EP (1982)
- NoMeansNo – You Kill Me 12" EP (1985)
- NoMeansNo – The Day Everything Became Nothing 12" EP (1988)
- NoMeansNo – The Power of Positive Thinking 12" EP (1990)
- NoMeansNo – Oh Canaduh 7" (1991)
