= Rob Wright (musician) =

Canadian musician and songwriter (born 1954)

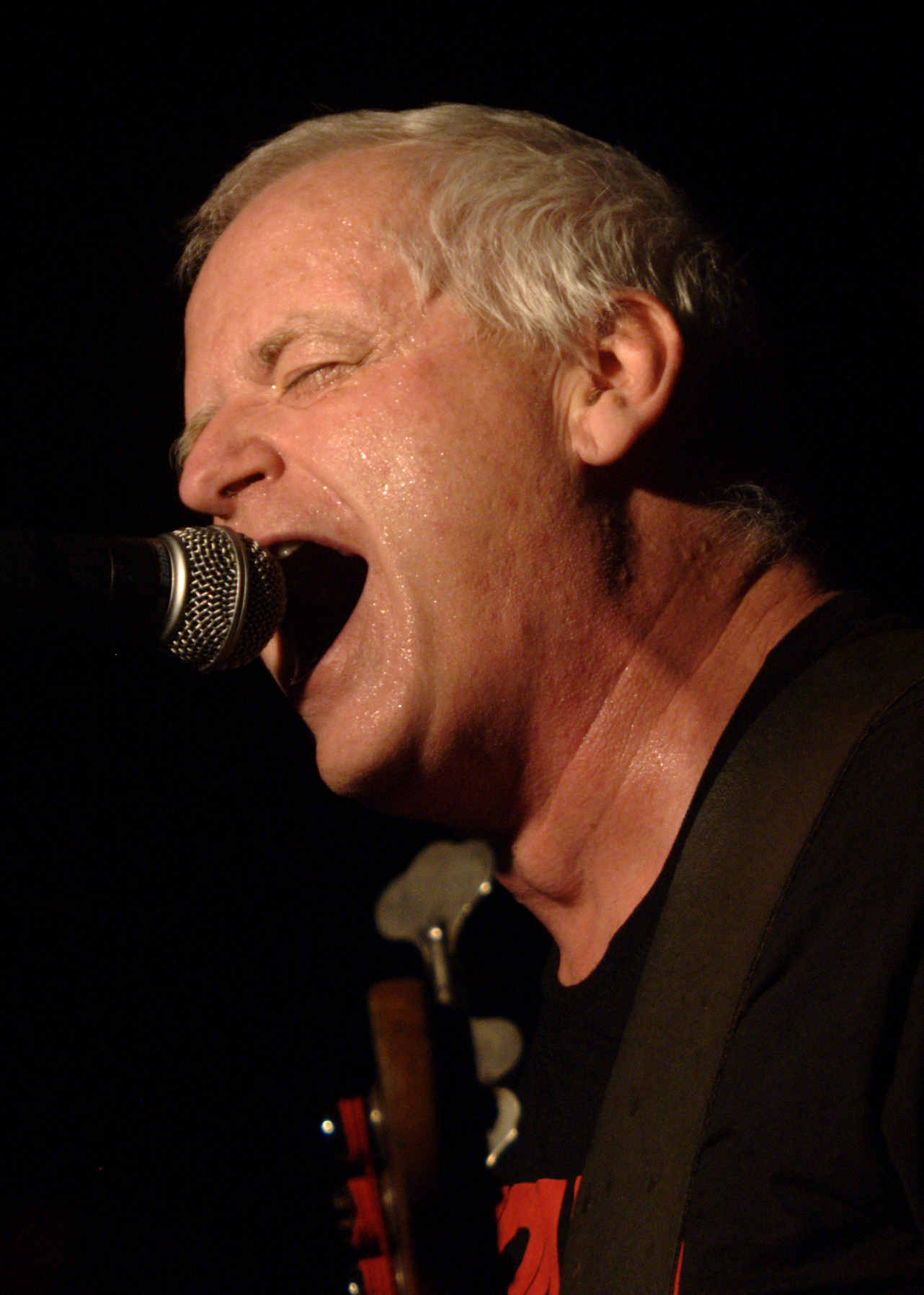
- Rob Wright in Trento, Italy (2010)

Background information
- Born: 12 March 1954 (age 72); Montreal, Quebec
- Genres: Punk rock, progressive rock, punk jazz
- Occupations: Musician, songwriter, multi-instrumentalist, producer
- Instruments: Vocals, bass guitar, guitar
- Years active: 1979–2016
- Labels: Alternative Tentacles, Wrong, Southern

Rob Wright (sometimes known as Mr. Wrong; born 12 March 1954) is a Canadian musician and songwriter best known as the bassist, lead vocalist and occasional guitarist of the progressive punk rock band Nomeansno, as well as the bassist of the pop punk band The Hanson Brothers. Wright was born in Montreal, Quebec, and currently resides in Vancouver, British Columbia.

In addition to NoMeansno and The Hanson Brothers, both of which feature his brother John and guitarist Tom Holliston, Wright has composed and recorded an occasional solo act called Mr. Wrong where he sings and plays bass while performing in an authoritarian priest outfit. He has also recorded with Ford Pier, Itch and the instrumental progressive power-trio Removal (as the Mr. Wrong character in the latter.) In the late 1970s and early 1980s, Wright dabbled in record production, recording and/or producing many noted underground British Columbia punk groups, most notably the Neos.

As a bassist, Wright utilizes a distinct technique to create a sound that relies on frequencies traditionally associated with a guitar. He took the inspiration for his amplification (involving a Marshall solid state head through a Marshall guitar 4x12 cabinet) from Lemmy Kilmister of Motörhead, and has cited jazz bassists such as Jimmy Blanton and Paul Chambers as influential players. His hard-picked, fast-fretted playing is highly respected among bassists, and has been praised by Mike Watt of The Minutemen, among other musicians.

Rob Wright co-operates the record label Wrong Records. He has two children.
