= John Wright (musician) =

Canadian musician and songwriter

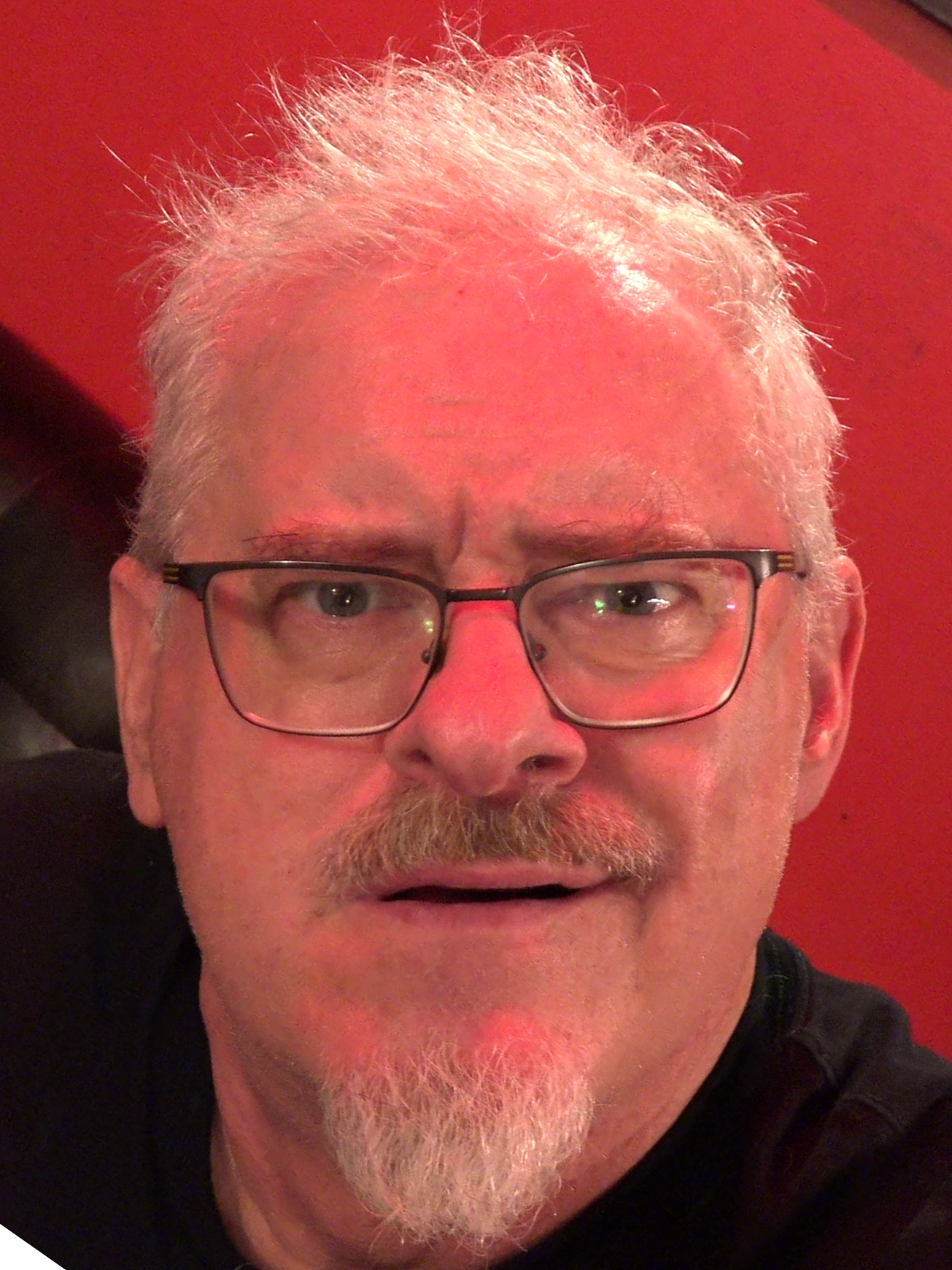
- John Wright in New York City (2024)

Background information
- Born: February 23, 1962 (age 64); Victoria, British Columbia, Canada
- Origin: Vancouver, British Columbia, Canada
- Genres: Punk rock, progressive rock
- Occupations: Musician, songwriter, multi-instrumentalist, producer
- Instruments: Vocals, drums, keyboards
- Years active: 1979–present
- Labels: Alternative Tentacles, Wrong Records, Southern Records
- Formerly of: NoMeansNo, The Hanson Brothers, DOA, The Showbusiness Giants, The Infamous Scientists

John Wright (sometimes known as Mr. Right) (born February 23, 1962) is a Canadian musician and songwriter.

== Biography ==
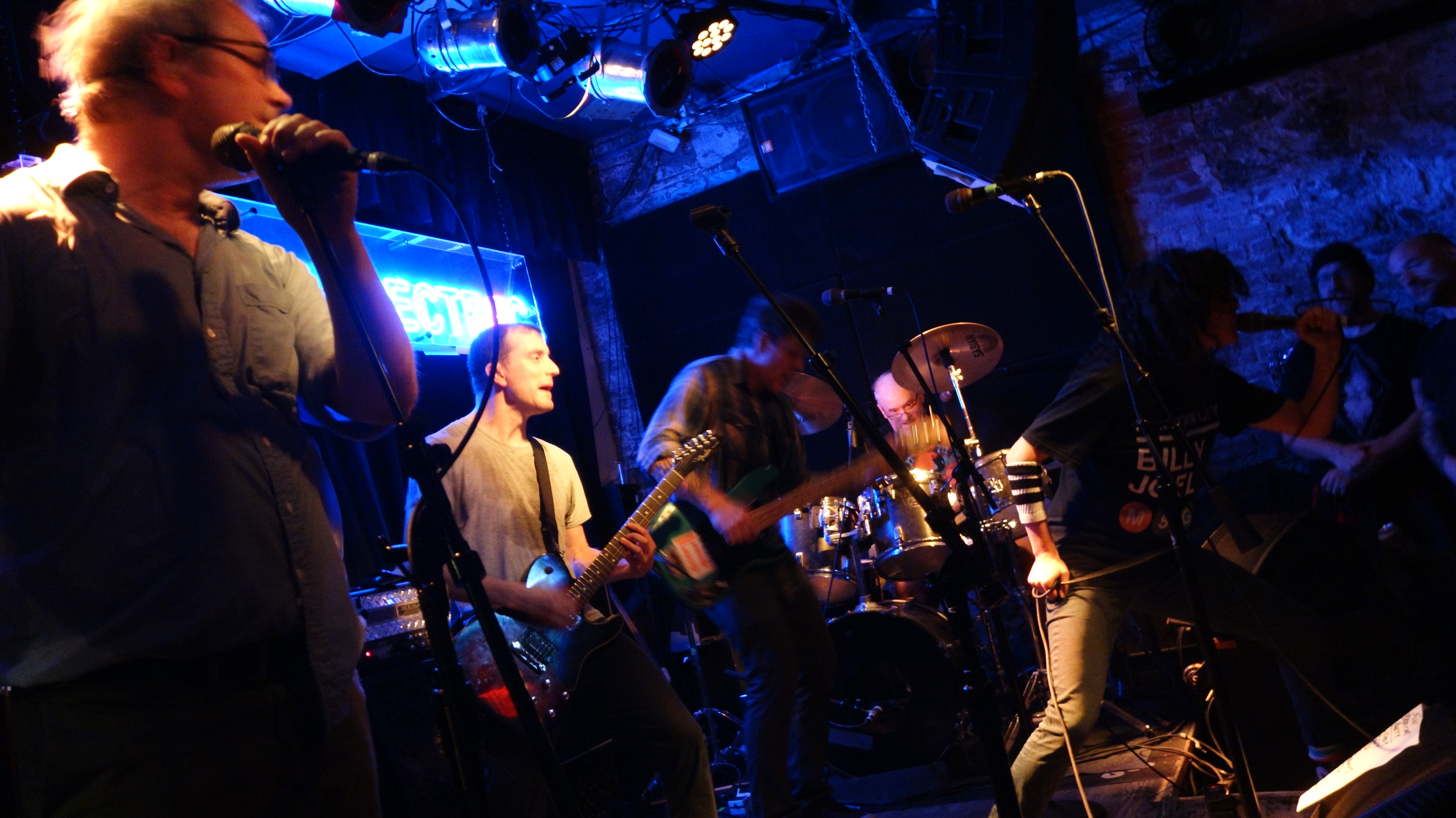
dead bob at the Bowery Electric in NYC while on tour

Wright is best known as the drummer, keyboardist, occasional vocalist and co-songwriter in the progressive punk rock/punk jazz band NoMeansNo, as well as the lead singer and co-songwriter of the pop-punk group The Hanson Brothers. Both groups also feature Wright's older brother Rob and guitarist Tom Holliston.

He has also performed in noted Canadian punk groups DOA, the Showbusiness Giants, and the Infamous Scientists. He was the songwriter and "musical director" for Compressorhead, a collaboration with Berlin-based artist Frank Barnes consisting of a "band" of robots that play real instruments. In 2023, Wright formed the band Dead Bob who released their debut album, Life Like, in November of that year.

Wright's distinct style of drumming utilizes traditional grip, an uncommon method for hard rock drummers, and fuses jazz, rock and punk techniques. His playing has been cited as an influence by several noted drummers, including Dave Grohl of Nirvana and the Foo Fighters, Tre Cool of Green Day, and Tim Solyan of Victims Family. Nomeansno further emphasized the drumming in the live environment by positioning the drum kit not near the back of the stage as is more common, but rather near the front of the stage so that the audience may see a side view of the drummer. Wright confirmed that this arrangement was intentional:

There's no doubt that it's more exciting for audience to see what the drummer's doing and you feel more connected to the rhythm section that way. I mean that was standard set up in the old days – rock n' roll was the oddball that put the drummer in the back.

An avid homebrewer of beer, he has filmed and released an instructional video detailing his recommended brewing process. This video is currently available on DVD packaged with the live Hanson Brothers record It's A Living. In 2019, Wright and his brother Rob teamed with Isaac Tremblay to open the Wildwood Public House, a craft beer pub in Powell River, British Columbia. The pub closed for re-organization in December 2022, with the intent to re-open the following March, but the business remained closed.

== Personal life ==
Wright is the father of two sons.
