= Alternative Tentacles =

American independent record label

- Founded: 1979
- Founder: Jello Biafra; East Bay Ray
- Distributor: Revolver USA
- Genre: Punk rock; alternative rock; spoken word; hardcore punk; cowpunk; heavy metal
- Country of origin: United States
- Location: Emeryville, California (current); San Francisco, California (historic)
- Official website: www.alternativetentacles.com

Alternative Tentacles is an independent record label established in 1979 by Dead Kennedys vocalist Jello Biafra and guitarist East Bay Ray in San Francisco, California, with the intention to release the Dead Kennedys' self-produced single "California Über Alles". After realizing the potential for an independent label, they began releasing records for other bands as well. They would go on to release albums by artists such as Dead Kennedys, NoMeansNo, D.O.A., Alice Donut, Lard, the Dicks, Butthole Surfers, 7 Seconds, Neurosis, Wesley Willis, Half Japanese, Blowfly, Subhumans (Canada), the Crucifucks, Victims Family, Pansy Division, Zolar X, Culture Shock, World/Inferno Friendship Society, Itchy-O, ArnoCorps, the Darts (US), Tsunami Bomb, and many more. In the mid-1980s, Jello Biafra became the sole owner of Alternative Tentacles.

== History ==
The origins of Alternative Tentacles trace back to June 1979. The name Alternative Tentacles was used as the label name on Dead Kennedys' self-produced debut single, "California Über Alles". In true independent spirit, the band had saved their gig money for a year to produce their own record instead of waiting for an established label to sign them. The single would do better than anyone expected, garnering considerable attention throughout the U.S. and Europe. At the same time, lead singer Jello Biafra's 1979 mayoral campaign in San Francisco helped kick-start interest from the British music press that culminated in a very successful British and European tour in the fall of 1980, upon the release of their full-length debut, Fresh Fruit For Rotting Vegetables.

The original idea was for Alternative Tentacles to be based in Europe only, and concentrate on European releases and exposure for then-unknown American bands after Biafra found many Dead Kennedys fans were far more interested in the American underground than the overseas labels and press were.

The result was the Let Them Eat Jellybeans! compilation album. This was quickly followed with singles by D.O.A., Bad Brains, Black Flag, Flipper, TSOL, Voice Farm, Hüsker Dü, and more. But the impact of Jellybeans and Alternative Tentacles turned out to be even greater outside Great Britain. Jellybeans and Dead Kennedys' follow-up '81 European tour is credited with breaking open the still strong underground scenes in Finland, Italy, Germany, and even behind the Iron Curtain.

Meanwhile, Jellybeans was also gaining steam in America. Many Americans were picking up import copies as a way of tuning in to the ongoing underground explosion in the States. Alternative Tentacles U.S. was off and running with domestic releases of new albums by D.O.A., TSOL, Dead Kennedys, Butthole Surfers, the Dicks, the Crucifucks and many more.

At the same time a friend in San Francisco, Ruth Schwartz, was starting Mordam Records label and distribution. They partnered with Alternative Tentacles Records to handle global distribution in 1983.

As the label progressed, an increasing divide between Biafra and Ray developed, stemming from a combination of personal, financial, and philosophical differences over the direction of the label. Biafra had a strong vision for the label's direction, focusing on politically charged and experimental acts prioritizing a more avant-garde and activist-focused roster and Ray was feeling that was increasingly too narrow of a direction. Also feeling that there was an increasing conflict of interest between the interest of Dead Kennedys and the label, Ray sold his stake in the mid-1980s, allowing Jello Biafra to maintain full creative control over Alternative Tentacles, while Ray focused on the running of the band’s partnership.

In addition to musical acts, Alternative Tentacles has also published spoken word albums, many by Jello Biafra himself. Another common theme of Alternative Tentacles records over the years has been the artwork of Winston Smith, which has appeared on many of their records, catalogs, posters and shirts. Smith also designed the original Alternative Tentacles logo in 1981.

"From the very beginning, everyone agreed that the label should treat the bands fairly and decently," says Greg Werckman, who managed AT from 1989-1997. "It was never hip to be on Alternative Tentacles the way it was to be on Sub Pop. That was its appeal to me. We stayed true to our vision."

Alternative Tentacles has had a number of locations around San Francisco over the years. The first office was in Dead Kennedys tour manager Mike Bonnano’s bedroom at the A-Hole, a punk rock household at Third and Bryant in San Francisco. They then went on to share offices with Mordam Records on Rodgers Street South of Market, then on Shipley Street still in the South of Market neighborhood shared with Mordam, then moved to the Mission District with Mordam Records on Folsom Street.

In 1995, Alternative Tentacles moved to their own office in the Noe Valley neighborhood in San Francisco, before relocating to Emeryville, California, across the Bay in October 2002 and the label has continued its operation there to present day.

In 2009, following the closure of Lumberjack Mordam Music Group, Alternative Tentacles Records switched global distribution to San Francisco based Revolver/Mid-Heaven.

In 2006, they re-released some classic early-1980s recordings in its "Re-issues Of Necessity" series by the likes of JFA, the Dicks, BGK, the Fartz, Los Olvidados, Drunk Injuns, Free Beer, False Prophets, Amebix, M.I.A., Nausea, Mentally Ill, and the classic compilation Not So Quiet on the Western Front.

In April 2019, Kerrang! ran a long form feature called "An Oral History of Alternative Tentacles".

In March 2020, Bandcamp ran a feature on their site entitled "The Lesser-Known Classics of Alternative Tentacles Records" as part of their label profile series.

In 2023, Alternative Tentacles announced that they would be once again releasing the entire Nomeansno catalog on the label after the band had left the label in 2002, starting with the 7" "Dad/Revenge". This was followed by the release of their 1989 full length, Wrong, in 2024.

Through 2024, the label has released over 500 recordings and has made a push to reissue some of the most popular releases on vinyl, releasing limited edition color versions both as pre-orders through their website and through a Patreon program they launched in October 2023.

== United Kingdom branch ==
In the early 1980s, Alternative Tentacles opened an office in the UK (eventually settling at 64 Mountgrove Road in London) to release special editions of American punk records that were unavailable in Europe, many of which were licensed from other independent U.S. labels. Among these were releases by SST Records' groups Black Flag and Hüsker Dü, the Dischord Records compilation Flex Your Head, and an EP of tracks from the Bad Brains eponymous 1982 album, as well as U.K. pressings of all American Dead Kennedys releases. It was also a distribution hub for Elemental Records until closed in 1994.

== Controversies ==
In 1985, Los Angeles prosecutors charged Biafra with "distributing harmful matter to minors" for artwork contained in the Dead Kennedys album Frankenchrist. The artwork was a poster reproduction of the painting "Work 219: Landscape XX", also known as "Penis Landscape" by H.R. Giger. The case ended in a hung jury and charges were not re-filed. Biafra presented a detailed account of the trial on his second spoken word album, High Priest of Harmful Matter − Tales from the Trial.

In 1994 in the wake of the punk zine Maximum Rocknroll taking Alternative Tentacles to task over Alternative Tentacles and Dead Kennedys working with EMI-owned distributor Caroline through Mordam, and banning ads and reviews from the label, Jello Biafra was assaulted at the Gilman St. music club in Berkeley, California, by a group of people chanting “Rich Rock Star”.

"Of course, it was easy to label me as a sell-out because I was part of the neighborhood," says Biafra of the MRR row. "It was one crab trying to pull another crab back in the bucket. For me, using a major distributor is more like the martial arts principle of using the enemy's strength against them. I want my work to be available in remote small towns and cultural ghettos. People have to have that opportunity."

In early 2000, the label and Biafra were named in a lawsuit brought by his former Dead Kennedys bandmates. The suit claimed that Biafra had failed to pay the band's members a decade's worth of royalties on the band's albums, totaling some $76,000.

All sides agreed the initial underpayment of royalties was due to an accounting error and Biafra himself had also not been paid from those royalties. However, the jury ultimately ruled that Alternative Tentacles and Biafra were "guilty of malice, oppression and fraud" by not promptly informing his former bandmates of the matter and instead withholding the information during subsequent discussions and contractual negotiations. The other Dead Kennedys members only learned of the royalty underpayment from a whistleblower at the record label.

A 2003 appeal upheld the verdict and judgment against Biafra and the record label of $200,000 in compensation and punitive damages. The result of the case saw the rights to the Dead Kennedys albums turned over to Decay Music, a partnership of all four members of the band (including Biafra himself), the majority of which voted to pull the records from Alternative Tentacles and license them to Manifesto Records in the United States (and to other labels in the rest of the world). This was a blow to Alternative Tentacles, leading to financial uncertainty for the label.

In 2009 while speaking to The Guardian, Biafra described losing the Kennedys from Alternative Tentacles as "like getting some of your limbs blown off".

"I've used my own money to keep the label afloat. Now many of our label peers are down to one or two employees or pulling the plug altogether. That scares the living shit out of me in some ways, but I think we're better equipped because we already know how to survive hard times. It got awfully tempting to just crack up once and for all and turn into Syd Barrett after what they did to me," he admits. "But I have so many unrecorded songs and ideas that I can't not continue to make new work."

== Artists ==
The following artists have either been signed to the Alternative Tentacles record label or had material released through them:

- 7 Seconds
- Akimbo
- Alice Donut
- Ani Kyd
- ArnoCorps
- Amebix
- Bad Brains
- Beatnigs
- The Bellrays
- Black Flag
- Black Kali Ma
- BlöödHag
- Blowfly
- BGK
- Brujeria
- Brutal Juice
- Burning Image
- Buzzkill
- Butthole Surfers
- The Causey Way
- Chill Eb
- Christian
- Christian Lunch
- Citizen Fish
- Comets on Fire
- Creeps On Candy
- Cross Stitched Eyes
- Crucifucks
- The Darts
- Dash Rip Rock
- Dead Ending
- Dead Kennedys
- Dead Pioneers
- Death Hymn Number 9
- DFMK
- The Dicks
- Disaster Strikes
- D.O.A.
- Doc Corbin Dart
- Dog Faced Hermans
- The Dot Wiggin Band
- Duh
- East Bay Ray
- Eat
- Eugene Chadbourne
- Evan Johns and The H-Bombs
- The Evaporators
- eX-Girl
- F-Minus
- Facepuller
- False Prophets
- The Fartz
- Feral Ohms
- Fish Karma
- Patrik Fitzgerald
- The Flaming Stars
- Fleshies
- Flipper
- Free Beer
- Galloping Coroners (Vágtázó Halottkémek)
- Geza X
- Git Some
- God Bullies
- Grong Grong
- Grotus
- Half Japanese
- Howard Zinn
- Hack
- The Hanson Brothers
- Hissanol
- Husker Du
- itchy-O
- Jarboe
- Jello Biafra
- Jello Biafra and the Guantanamo School of Medicine
- Jucifer
- Jungle Studs
- Kepone
- Klaus Flouride
- Kultur Shock
- L.A. Machina
- Lard
- Les Thugs
- Leftöver Crack
- Legendary Shack Shakers
- Life After Life
- Logical Nonsense
- The Looters
- Los Gusanos
- Ludicra
- Mat Callahan
- MDC
- Melvins
- M.I.A.
- Michael Gira
- Mischief Brew
- Mojo Nixon
- Molotov Cocktail
- Motorpyscho
- Moms With Bangs
- Nardwuar the Human Serviette
- Nausea
- Neurosis
- Noam Chomsky
- No WTO Combo
- Nomeansno
- The November 3
- Pachinko
- Pansy Division
- Part Time Christians
- Peligro
- Pins of Light
- Pitchshifter
- The Phantom Limbs
- Porch
- Ratos de Porão
- Really Red
- Radiopuhelimet
- Redshift
- Ratos De Poråo
- Sandrider
- Saturn's Flea Collar
- Sibling Rivalry
- The Silver Machine
- The Skatenigs
- Skarp
- Skrapyard
- Slim Cessna's Auto Club
- Tony Slug
- SNFU
- Spindrift
- Star Fucking Hipsters
- Stickdog
- Subhumans
- Teddy & the Frat Girls
- Thrall
- Toxic Reasons
- Tragic Mulatto
- TARANTELLA
- Triclops!
- Tribe 8
- Tsunami Bomb
- Tumor Circus
- Turn Me on Dead Man
- T.S.O.L.
- Ultra Bide
- Unsane
- VHK
- Victim's Family
- Voice Farm
- Ward Churchill
- Wesley Willis
- Wheelchair Sports Camp
- White Trash Debutants
- Witch Hunt
- The Witch Trials
- The Woodbox Gang
- The World/Inferno Friendship Society
- The Yuppie Pricks
- Zen Guerrilla
- Zeni Geva
- Zolar X

== Discography ==
- Alternative Tentacles discography

== See also ==
- List of record labels
- Virus 100
