= Alternative Tentacles discography =

Alternative Tentacles
- Founded: 1979
- Founder: Jello Biafra; East Bay Ray
- Distributor: Revolver USA
- Genre: Punk rock Alternative rock
- Country of origin: United States
- Location: Emeryville, California (current); San Francisco, California (historic)
- Official website: www.alternativetentacles.com

Alternative Tentacles is an American independent record label founded in 1979 by Jello Biafra and East Bay Ray. In 1998, Biafra's former bandmates sued him for unpaid royalties and severed their ties with the label.

== Key ==
No.	The release's unique catalog number. These are formatted as VIRUS 000.
7"	7 inch single
10"	10 inch single
12"	12 inch single
CS	Cassette tape
CD	Compact disc
DI	Music download
DVD	Compact disc
EP	Extended play
LP	Long play
VHS	Compact disc

== List of releases ==
=== United States discography ===
No.	Year	Artist	Title	Format
95-41	1979	Dead Kennedys	"California über alles"/"The Man with the Dogs"	7"
1	1980	Dead Kennedys	Fresh Fruit for Rotting Vegetables	LP
2	1981	Dead Kennedys	Too Drunk to Fuck	7"
3	1981	The Witch Trials	The Witch Trials	LP
4	1981	Various artists	Let Them Eat Jellybeans!	LP
5	1981	Dead Kennedys	In God We Trust, Inc.	EP
6	1981	Dead Kennedys	Nazi Punks Fuck Off	7"
7	1981	D.O.A.	"Positively D.O.A."	7"
08	1981	Flipper	"Ha Ha Ha"	7"
9	1981	Black Flag	Six Pack	7"
10	1982	T.S.O.L.	Weathered Statues	7"
11	1982	Christian Lunch	"Bites From Bait"	7"
12	1982	Klaus Flouride	"Shortnin Bread"	12"
13	1982	Bad Brains	Bad Brains	EP
14	1982	Various artists	Not So Quiet on the Western Front	LP
15	1982	7 Seconds	"Skins, Brains and Guts"	7"
16	1982	Voice Farm	"Double Garage"	7"
17	1982	The Fartz	World Full of Hate...	EP
18				
19	1984	Teddy & the Frat Girls	I Wanna Be A Man	EP
20	1981	Geza X	We Need More Power !!	EP
21	1982	The Fartz	Because This Fuckin' World Stinks...	EP
22	1983	Various artists	Flex Your Head	LP
23	1982	Dead Kennedys	"Bleed for Me	7", 12"
24	1982	D.O.A.	War on 45	EP
25	1982	Hüsker Dü	Land Speed Record	LP
26	1982	MDC	Millions of Dead Cops	LP
27	1982	Dead Kennedys	Plastic Surgery Disasters	CS, LP
28	1982	Dead Kennedys	"Halloween"	7", 12"
29	1982	T.S.O.L.	Beneath the Shadows	CS, LP
30	1982	David Lynch & Alan Splet	Eraserhead Original Soundtrack	LP
31	1982	D.O.A.	Bloodied But Unbowed	LP
32	1982	Butthole Surfers	Butthole Surfers	EP
33	1982	Tragic Mulatto	Tragic Mulatto	7"
34	1982	East Bay Ray	"Trouble in Town"/"Poison Heart"	7"
35	1982	M.I.A.	Murder in a Foreign Place	LP
36	1985	Klaus Flouride	Cha Cha Cha With Mr. Flouride	LP
37	1984	Tragic Mulatto	Judo for the Blind	LP
38	1984	The Crucifucks	The Crucifucks	LP
39	1984	Butthole Surfers	Live PCPPEP	EP
40	1984	Part Time Christians	Rock And Roll Is Disco	EP
41	1984	Toxic Reasons	Kill By Remote Control	LP
42	1984	D.O.A.	Don't Turn Yer Back (On Desperate Times)	EP
43	1985	The Dicks	These People	LP
44	1985	D.O.A.	Let's Wreck the Party	LP
45	1985	Dead Kennedys	Frankenchrist	CD, CS, LP
46	1985	Amebix	Arise!	LP
47	1986	Evan Johns & The H-Bombs	Rollin' Through the Night	LP
48	1986	False Prophets	False Prophets	LP
49	1986	Grong Grong	Grong Grong	LP
50	1986	Dead Kennedys	Bedtime for Democracy	CD, LP
51	1986	Jungle Studs	Jungle Studs	LP
52	1986	B.G.K.	Nothing Can Go Wrogn!	LP
53	1987	The Crucifucks	Wisconsin	LP
54	1986	Looters	Looters	EP
55	1986	Toxic Reasons	Bullets for You	LP
56	1987	Nomeansno	Sex Mad	CD, CS, LP
57	1987	Dead Kennedys	Give Me Convenience or Give Me Death	CD, LP
58	1987	False Prophets	Implosion	LP
59	1987	Jello Biafra	No More Cocoons	CS, LP
60	1987	Nomeansno	"Dad"/"Revenge"	7"
61	1988	Alice Donut	Donut Comes Alive	CD, CS, LP
62	1988	Nomeansno	The Day Everything Became Nothing	EP
63	1988	Nomeansno	The Day Everything Became Isolated and Destroyed	CD, CS
64	1988	Stickdog	Human	LP
65	1988	The Beatnigs	The Beatnigs	CD, CS, LP
66	1989	Jello Biafra	High Priest of Harmful Matter: Tales from the Trial	CS, LP
67	1988	Klaus Flouride	Because I Say So	CS, LP
68	1988	Various artists	Oops! Wrong Stereotype	CS, LP
69	1987	Tragic Mulatto	Locos por el Sexo	LP
70	1990	Christian Lunch	Unreliable Sources	CS, LP
71	1988	The Beatnigs	"Television"	LP
72	1989	Lard	The Power of Lard	CD, CS, LP
73	1989	Alice Donut	Bucketfulls of Sickness and Horror in an Otherwise Meaningless Life	CD, LP
74	1989	Tragic Mulatto	Hot Man Pussy	LP
75	1989	Various artists	Terminal City Ricochet: Original Motion Picture Soundtrack	CD, CS, LP
76	1989	Klaus Flouride, Alice Donut & Tragic Mulatto	"Eat Me Tender"	7"
77	1989	Nomeansno	Wrong	CD, CS, LP
78	1989	Jello Biafra & D.O.A.	Last Scream of the Missing Neighbors	CD, CS, LP
79	1990	Doc Corbin Dart	Patricia	LP
80	1990	Tragic Mulatto	Chartreuse Toulouse	LP
81	1990	Nomeansno	The Power of Positive Thinking	EP
82	1990	Alice Donut	Mule	CD, CS, LP
83	1990	Alice Donut	"My Boyfriend's Back" / "Demonologist"	7"
84	1990	Lard	The Last Temptation of Reid	CD, CS, LP
85	1991	Jello Biafra & Nomeansno	The Sky Is Falling and I Want My Mommy	CD, CS, LP
86	1991	Nomeansno	You Kill Me	EP
87	1991	Tumor Circus	Tumor Circus	CD, CS, LP
88	1990	Lard	"I Am Your Clock"	12"
89	1991	Tumor Circus	Take Me Back Or I'll Drown Our Dog	EP
90	1991	Jello Biafra	Die For Oil, Sucker	7"
91	1991	Alice Donut	Revenge fantasies of the impotent	CD, CS, LP
92	1991	Vágtázó Halottkémek	A Világösztön Kiugrasztása	LP
93	1991	Les Thugs	"I.A.B.F."	CD, CS, LP
94	1991	Jello Biafra	I Blow Minds for a Living	CD, CS, LP
95	1991	Klaus Flouride	The Light Is Flickering	CD, LP
96	1991	Vágtázó Halottkémek	Galloping Coroners	7"
97	1991	Nomeansno	Live + Cuddly	CD, CS, LP
98	1991	Nomeansno	0 + 2 = 1	CD, CS, LP
99	1991	Hack	Rawhead	7"
100	1992	Various artists	Virus 100	CD, CS, LP
101	1991	Alice Donut	The Ass Trilogy	CD, LP
102	1992	Tumor Circus	"Meathook Up My Rectum"	7"
103	1991	Skrapyard	Sex Is Sex	CD, LP
104	1992	Skatenigs	Loudspeaker	CD, LP
105	1992	Skatenigs	Stupid People Shouldn't Breed	CD, LP
106	1992	D.O.A.	The Dawning Of A New Error	CD, CS
107	1991	White Trash Debutantes	San Francisco	7"
108	1992	Victims Family	The Germ	CD, CS, LP
109	1992	Neurosis	Souls at Zero	CD, CS, LP
110	1992	Vágtázó Halottkémek	Hammering on the Gates of Nothingness	CD, CS, LP
111	1994	The Crucifucks	Our Will Be Done	CD
112	1992	Various artists	The Bat Is Back	CD
113	1992	Brujeria	¡Machetazos!	7"
114	1992	Alice Donut	"Magdalene"	7", CD
115	1992	Alice Donut	The Untidy Suicides of Your Degenerate Children	CD, CS, LP
116	1992	Hanson Brothers	Gross Misconduct	CD, CS, LP
117	1992	D.O.A.	13 Flavours of Doom	CD, CS, LP
118	1993	Grotus	Slow Motion Apocalypse	CD, CS, LP
119	1992	Eugene Chadbourne & Evan Johns	Terror Has Some Strange Kinfolk	CD, CS, LP
120	1993	D.O.A.	It's Not Unusual... But It Sure Is Ugly!	7", CD
121	1993	Alice Donut	Magdalene	7", CD
122	1993	Brutal Juice	I Love the Way They Scream When They Die	CD, CS
123	1993	Nomeansno	Why Do They Call Me Mr. Happy?	CD, CS, LP
124	1994	Chill E. B.	Born Suspicious	CD, CS, LP
125	1993	Eugene Chadbourne & Evan Johns	"Achey Rakey Heart"	7"
126	1993	Porch	"Expectorant"/"Iceberg"	7"
127	1993	Zeni Geva	"Disgraceland"	7"
128	1993	Grotus	Luddite	EP
129	1993	Victims Family	"Maybe If I..."	7"
130	1993	D.O.A.	Loggerheads	7"
131	1993	D.O.A.	"The Only Thing Green"	7"
132				
133	1993	D.O.A.	Disco Sucks	EP
134	1993	Neurosis	Enemy of the Sun	CD, CS, LP
135	1993	Zeni Geva	Desire for Agony	CD, CS, LP
136	1993	Jello Biafra & Mojo Nixon	"Will The Fetus Be Aborted?"	7", CD
137	1994	Jello Biafra & Mojo Nixon	Prairie Home Invasion	CD, CS, LP
138	1994	Victims Family	Headache Remedy	CD, CS, LP
139				
140	1980	D.O.A.	Headache Remedy	CD, CS, LP
141	1994	Los Gusanos	I'd Love To Save The World	7", CD
142	1994	Brujeria	"El Patrón"	7"
143	1994	Alice Donut	Dry Humping the Cash Cow (Live at CBGB)	7"
144	1994	Kepone	"295"	7"
145	1994	Various artists	The Bat Bites Back	CD
146	1994	Neurosis	Pain of Mind	CD, CS, LP
147	1994	Various artists	The Futility of a Well Ordered Life	CD
148	1994	Grotus	The Opiate of the Masses	EP
149	1994	Alice Donut	Video Monstrosity	VHS
150	1994	Jello Biafra	Beyond the Valley of the Gift Police	CD, CS, LP
151	1994	Dog Faced Hermans	Those Deep Buds	CD, CS, LP
152	1994	God Bullies	Kill the King	CD, CS, LP
153	1994	Sibling Rivalry	In a Family Way	7", CD
154	1994	Alice Donut	"Nadine"	7", CD
155	1995	Radiopuhelimet	"Hygiene"	7"
156	1995	Tribe 8	Fist City	CD, CS, LP
157	1995	Brutal Juice	I Love the Way They Scream When They Die	CD
158	1995	Ultra Bide	"Ultra Bode"	7"
159	1995	Dog Faced Hermans	Bump and Swing	CD, LP
160	1995	Hissanol	4th and Back	CD, LP
161	1995	D.O.A./Red Tide	Ken Jensen Memorial Single	EP
162	1995	Victims Family	4 Great Thrash Songs	CD, LP
163	1995	Alice Donut	Pure Acid Park	CD, LP
164	1995	Wesley Willis	Greatest Hits	CD, LP
165	1995	Peligro	Peligro	CD, LP
166	1995	Michael Gira	Drainland	CD
167	1995	Jarboe	Sacrificial Cake	CD
168	1995	DUH	The Unholy Handjob	CD, LP
169	1995	Ultra Bide	God Is God, Puke Is Puke	CD, LP
170	1995	Zeni Geva	Freedom Bondage	CD, LP
171	1995	Nomeansno	The Worldhood of the World (As Such)	CD, CS, LP
172	1995	Various artists	Attack of the Tentacles	CD
173	1995	Tribe 8	Roadkill Cafe	7", CD
174	1995	Life After Life	"Harrahya" / "Doors"	7"
175	Facepuller	Unauthorized Volume Dealers	CD, LP	
176	1996	Pachinko	"El Diablo En Señorita"	7"
177	1996	Saturn's Flea Collar	Stretch to Activate	EP
178	1996	Molotov Cocktail	Jerks in Progress	EP
179	1996	Buzzkill	Meat Is Dinner	EP
180	1996	Various artists	The Day the Needles Stood Still	CD
181	1996	Tribe 8	Snarkism	CD, LP
182	1994	Various artists	Let There Be Singles. (The Imports.)	CD
183	1996	Lolita No.18/Droop	Summer Time Blues	EP
184	1996	Nomeansno	Would We Be Alive?	EP
185	1996	Saturn's Flea Collar	Monosyllabic	CD, LP
186	1996	The Crucifucks	L.D. Eye	CD, LP
187	1996	The Fixtures	Devil's Playground	CD, CS, LP
188	1996	Buzzkill	Up	CD, LP
189	1996	Thrall	Chemical Wedding	CD LP
190	1996	Pachinko	Behind the Green Pachinko	CD, LP
191	1997	Dead and Gone	God Loves Everyone But You	CD, CS, LP
192	1997	Life After Life	Just Trip	CD, LP
193		Evil Mothers	Spider Sex and Car Wrecks	CD, CS, LP
194		Leech Woman	33°	CD
195	1997	Zen Guerrilla	Invisible Liftee Pad/Gap-Tooth Clown	CD, LP
196		Various artists	Requiem for a Junkie	CD
197	1997	Half Japanese	Bone Head	CD, LP
198	1997	Zen Guerrilla	"Trouble Shake" / "Change Gonna Come"	7"
199	1997	Lard	Pure Chewing Satisfaction	CD, CS, LP
200	1997	Dicks	1980-1986	CD
201	1998	Jello Biafra	If Evolution Is Outlawed, Only Outlaws Will Evolve	CD, CS, LP
202				
203	1997	Logical Nonsense	Expand the Hive	CD, LP
204		Various artists	Maximum Avant Cruelty!	EP
205	1996	Judi Bari	Who Bombed Judi Bari?	CD, CS, LP
206	1996	Mumia Abu-Jamal/Man Is the Bastard	Mumia Abu-Jamal Spoken Word With Music By Man Is the Bastard	CD, LP
207	1996	Nomeansno	Would We Be Alive?	EP
208	1997	Lost Goat	"Golem" / "October"	7"
209	1997	Various artists	The Virus That Would Not Die!	CD
210	1998	Hissanol	The Making of Him	CD, LP
211	1998	Zen Guerrilla	Positronic Raygun	CD, LP
212	1998	Tribe 8	Role Models for Amerika	CD, LP
213	1998	Ultra Bide	Super Milk	CD, LP
214	1998	Logical Nonsense	Soul Pollution	CD, LP
215	1998	Nomeansno	Dance of the Headless Bourgeoisie	CD, LP
216	1998	Saint James Infirmary	Own Device	7"
217	1998	The Fartz	Because This Fuckin' World Stinks...	EP
218	1999	B.G.K.	A Dutch Feast... The Complete Works of Balthasar Gerards Kommando	CD, LP
219	1998	Hellworms	Crowd Repellent	CD, LP
220	1997	Ratos De Porão	Carniceria Tropical	CD, LP
221	1998	Mumia Abu-Jamal	All Things Censored: Volume 1	CD, LP
222	1998	Noam Chomsky	Pure Chewing Satisfaction	CD
223	1999	Queen Bee	"Fine" / "Smitten"	7"
224	1999	Howard Zinn	A People's History of the United States	CD
225	1999	Los Infernos	"The Outlaw" / "Beer Run"	7"
226	1999	Me First and the Gimme Gimmes	In Your Barcalounger	7"
227	1999	Wesley Willis	Greatest Hits Vol. 2	CD, LP
228	1999	Jad Fair and Jason Willett	Enjoyable Songs	CD, LP
229	1999	Bastard Noise/Pain Jerk	Imminent Economic Collapse	7"
230	1999	Pachinko	Splendor In The Ass II: Electric Boogaloo	CD, LP
231	1999	The Causey Way	Wonders of Giardia	CD, LP
232	1999	Creeps on Candy	Creeps on Candy	7"
233	1999	Buzzkill	House of Bad Touch	CD, LP
234	1999	Angela Davis	The Prison Industrial Complex	CD
235	2000	Lard	70's Rock Must Die	CD, LP
236	2001	Noam Chomsky	Free Market Fantasies: Capitalism in the Real World	CD
237	1995	Black Kali Ma	You Ride the Pony (I'll Be the Bunny)	CD, LP
238	1999	Pitchshifter	Un-United Kingdom	EP
239	2000	SNFU	The Ping Pong	EP
240	2000	Los Infernos	Rock and Roll Nightmare	CD, LP
241	2000	Howard Zinn	Heroes And Martyrs: Emma Goldman, Sacco & Vanzetti, and the Revolutionary Struggle	CD
242	2000	Noam Chomsky	Case Studies In Hypocrisy: US Human Rights Policy	CD
243	2000	Amebix	Arise!	CD, LP
244	1995	False Prophets	Blind Roaches And Fat Vultures: Phantasmagoric Beasts of the Reagan Era	CD
245	2000	Half Japanese	Hello	CD, LP
246	2001	The Causey Way	Causey Vs. Everything	CD, LP
247	2000	Slim Cessna's Auto Club	Always Say Please and Thank You	CD, LP
248	2000	Nomeansno	One	CD, LP
249	2001	Ratos de Porão	Sistemados Pelo Crucifa	CD, LP
250	2001	The No WTO Combo	The No WTO Combo	CD, LP
251	2001	Wesley Willis	Rush Hour	CD, LP
252	2001	Various artists	The Ecstasy of the Agony	CD
253	2001	The Ex	1936, The Spanish Revolution	EP
254	2001	Various artists	Less Rock More Talk	CD, LP
255	2001	Howard Zinn	Stories Hollywood Never Tells	CD
256	2000	Jello Biafra	Emergency Election Special - The Green Wedge	7"
257	2001	Iowaska	Vine of Souls	CD, LP
258	2001	M.I.A.	Lost Boys	CD, LP
259	2001	The Pattern	Wet Circuit City	7"
260	2000	Jello Biafra	Become the Media	CD, LP
261	2001	Mumia Abu-Jamal	175 Progress Drive	CD
262	2001	The Fartz	Whats In a Name...?	CD, LP
263	2001	The Phantom Limbs	Applied Ignorance	CD, LP
264	2001	Fleshies	Kill the Dreamer's Dream	CD, LP
265	2001	Ratos de Porão	Guerra Civil Canibal	EP
266	2001	Victims Family	Apocalicious	CD, LP
267	2001	The Flaming Stars	"One Lonely Night" / "Days Like This"	7"
268	2001	The Flaming Stars	Ginmill Perfume	CD, LP
269	2001	Slim Cessna's Auto Club	Slim Cessna's Auto Club	CD, LP
270	2001	Fleshies/Victims Family	"Gonna Have to Pass"/"Calling Dr. Schlessinger"	7"
271	2001	Noam Chomsky	An American Addiction: Drugs, Guerillas, Counterinsurgency - US Intervention In Colombia	CD
272	2001	Various artists	Monkeywrenching The New World Order	CD
273	2002	Strobe Talbot	20 Pop Songs	CD
274	2002	Teenage Fanclub & Jad Fair	Words of Wisdom and Hope	CD, LP
275	2002	Jonathan Jackson, Jr. & Rhonda Ramiro	Prisons on Fire: George Jackson, Attica & Black Liberation	CD
276	2002	Jello Biafra	The Big Ka-Boom, Pt. 1	CD, LP
277	2002	Various artists	Apocalypse Always	CD
278	2002	Teenage Fanclub & Jad Fair	"Always in My Heart"/"Let's Celebrate"	7"
279	2002	The Fartz	Injustice (15 Working Class Songs)	CD, LP
280	2002	Ward Churchill	In a Pig's Eye: Reflections on the Police State, Repression and Native America	CD
281	2002	Free Beer	The Only Beer That Matters	CD, LP
282	2002	Los Olvidados	Listen To This!!!	CD, LP
283	2002	Drunk Injuns	From Where the Sun Now Stands I Will Fight No More, Forever	CD, LP
284	2002	Alexander Cockburn	Beating The Devil: The Incendiary Rants of Alexander Cockburn	CD, LP
285	2002	Various artists	Mob Action Against The State: Collected Speeches From the Bay Area Anarchist Book Fair	CD
286	2002	The Flaming Stars	Sunset & Void	CD
287	2002	Articles of Faith	Complete Vol. 1 1981-1983	CD
288	2002	Articles of Faith	Complete Vol. 2 1983-1985	CD
289	2002	Darryl Cherney & The Chernobles	"Bush It!"/"Send George Bush A Pretzel"	7"
290	2002	Jello Biafra	Machine Gun in the Clown's Hand	CD, LP
291	2002	Ratos de Porão	Onisciente coletivo	CD, LP
292	2003	Howard Zinn	Artists in a Time of War	CD
293	2002	Noam Chomsky	The New War on Terrorism: Fact and Fiction	CD
294	2003	JFA	We Know You Suck	CD
295	2003	Christian Parenti	Taking Liberties (Prisons, Policing and Surveillance in an Age of Crisis)	CD
296	2001	Jim Hightower	The People Are Revolting! (In the Very Best Sense of the World)	CD
297	2003	Fleshies	The Sicilian	CD
298	2003	Ward Churchill	Pacifism and Pathology in the American Left	CD
299	2003	Articles of Faith/Vic Bondi	Fortunate Son	EP
300	2003	Jello Biafra with the Melvins	Never Breathe What You Can't See	CD, LP
301	2003	Comets on Fire	Comets on Fire	CD
302	2003	Deadweight	Stroking the Moon	CD
303	2003	Arundhati Roy with Howard Zinn	Come September: In Conversation with Howard Zinn	CD
304	2003	Pansy Division	Total Entertainment!	CD
305	2003	The Phantom Limbs	Displacement	CD, LP
306	2003	Harold Ray	Live in Concert	CD, LP
307	2003	Noam Chomsky	The Emerging Framework of World Power	CD
308	2003	Thrall	Lifer	CD
309	2003	Wesley Willis & The Dragnews	Greatest Hits Volume 3	CD
310	2003	Articles of Faith	Chile: Promise of Freedom	CD
311	2004	The Evaporators	Ripple Rock	LP
312	2004	Greg Palast	Weapon of Mass Instruction	CD
313	2004	EX-Girl	Endangered Species	CD, LP
314				
315	2004	The Mentally Ill	Gacy’s Place: The Undiscovered Corpses	CD
316	2004	Burning Image	1983-1987	CD, LP
317	2004	Slim Cessna's Auto Club	The Bloudy Tenent Truth & Peace	CD, LP
318	2004	The Sermon	Volume	CD, LP
319	2004	Zolar X	Timeless	CD, LP
320	2004	Leftöver Crack	Fuck World Trade	CD, LP
321	2004	Ludicra	Another Great Love Song	CD, LP
322	2004	Howard Zinn	The People's History Project: Volume One	CD
323	2004	The Flaming Stars	Named and Shamed	CD
324	2004	Munly & The Lee Lewis Harlots	Munly & The Lee Lewis Harlots	CD
325	2004	The Bellrays	The Red, White & Black	CD, LP
326	2005	The Freak Accident	The Freak Accident	CD
327	2005	The Yuppie Pricks	Brokers Banquet	CD
328	2005	Pilot Scott Tracy	Any City	CD
329	2005	Dash Rip Rock	Recyclone	CD
330	2005	Buzzov•en	Welcome to Violence	CD
331	2005	Blowfly	Fahrenheit 69	CD, LP
332	2005	Robert F. Williams	Self-Defense, Self-Respect & Self-Determination	CD
333	2005	Norman Finkelstein	An Issue Of Justice: Origins of the Israel/Palestine Conflict	CD
334	2005	Ani Kyd	Evil Needs Candy Too	CD
335	2005	Nøb Dylan and His Nøbsøletes	Positively 12 Stiff Dylans!	CD
336	2005	Melvins + Lustmord	Pigs of the Roman Empire	LP
337	2005	Melvins	Mangled Demos from 1983	CD, LP
338	2005	Nausea	The Punk Terrorist Anthology Vol. 2	CD
339	2005	Skarp	Requiem	CD, LP
340	2005	Turn Me on Dead Man	God Bless the Electric Freak	CD, LP
341	2005	Report Suspicious Activity	Report Suspicious Activity	CD
342	2005	F-Minus	Won't Bleed Me/Failed Society	CD, LP
343	2006	Pansy Division	The Essential Pansy Division	CD
344	2006	Akimbo	Forging Steel and Laying Stone	CD, LP
245				
346	2006	16 Horsepower	Hoarse	CD
347	2005	Tarantella	Esqueletos	CD
348	2005	Nausea	The Punk Terrorist Anthology Vol. 1	CD
349	2006	Nardwuar	Doot Doola Doot Doo... Doot Doo!	DVD
350	2005	Jello Biafra with the Melvins	Sieg Howdy!	CD, LP
351	2006	Michael Parenti	Rulers of the Planet	DVD
352	2006	Knights of the New Crusade	A Challenge to the Cowards of Christendom	CD, LP
353	2006	I Object	Teaching Revenge	CD, LP
354	2006	Disaster Strikes	Liberty Toast	CD
355	2006	16 Horsepower	Live	DVD
356	2006	Pilot Scott Tracy	We Cut Loose!	CD
357	2006	BlöödHag	Hell Bent for Letters	CD, LP
358	2006	Fish Karma	The Theory of Intelligent Design	CD
359				
360	2006	Various artists	Stay Sick in '06	CD
361	2006	Fleshies	Scrape the Walls	CD, LP
362	2005	Turn Me on Dead Man	Technicolour Mother	CD
363	2006	Ratos de Porão	Homem Inimigo Do Homem	CD
364	2006	Ludicra	Fex Urbis Lex Orbis	CD, LP
365	2006	The Heads	Under the Stress of a Headlong Dive	CD
366	2006	Subhumans	New Dark Age Parade	CD, LP
367	2006	Blowfly	Punk Rock Party	CD, LP
368	2006	Robert Fisk	War, Journalism, And The Middle East	CD
369	2007	Akimbo	Harshing Your Mellow	CD
370	2006	Jello Biafra	In the Grip of Official Treason	CD
371				
372	2007	Dash Rip Rock	Hee Haw Hell	CD
373	2007	Leftöver Crack/Citizen Fish	Deadline	LP
374	2007	The (International) Noise Conspiracy	Live at Oslo Jazz Festival	CD
375	2007	Various artists	Sonic Terror Surge 2007	CD
376	2007	Greg Palast	Live From the Armed Madhouse	CD
377	2007	The Eat	It's Not the Eat, It's the Humidity	CD, LP
378	2007	Akimbo	Navigating the Bronze	CD, LP
379	2007	Zolar X	X Marks the Spot	CD, LP
380	2008	Triclops!	Out of Africa	CD, LP
381	2007	Jack Curran	924 Gilman St.: Let's Talk About Tact & Timing	DVD
382	2008	Amebix	No Sanctuary: The Spiderleg Recordings	CD, LP
383	2008	Slim Cessna's Auto Club	Cipher	CD, LP
384	2008	16 Horsepower	Live March 2001	CD
385	2008	Blatz/Filth	Shit Split	CD
386	2008	Jucifer	L'Autrichienne	LP
387	2008	The Woodbox Gang	Drunk as Dragons	CD
388	2008	Grady	Y. U. So Shady?	CD, LP
389	2008	Report Suspicious Activity	Destroy All Evidence	CD
390	2008	Jello Biafra	"Jezebel"/"Speed Demon"	7"
391	2008	Subhumans	Death Was Too Kind	CD, LP
392	2008	The Phantom Limbs	Accept The Juice/Whole Loto Love	CD/DVD
393	2008	Disaster Strikes	The Interrogation Sessions	EP
394	2009	Jello Biafra with Pansy Division	Average Men	7"
395	2009	Pansy Division	That's So Gay	CD
396	2007	Pansy Division	Life in a Gay Rock Band	DVD
397	2009	Cross Stitched Eyes	Coranach	CD/LP
398	2009	Witch Hunt	Burning Bridges to Nowhere	CD, LP
399	2009	Th' Inbred	Legacy of Fertility	CD
400	2015	Jello Biafra and The Raunch and Soul All-Stars	Walk on Jindal's Splinters	CD, LP
401	2009	Th' Inbred	Legacy Of Fertility Volume 1: Kissin' Cousins	LP
402	2009	Th' Inbred	Legacy Of Fertility Volume 2: Kissin' Cousins	LP
403	2009	Burning Image	Fantasma	CD
404	2010	Subhumans	Same Thoughts Different Day	CD, LP
405	2009	Turn Me on Dead Man	Sunshine Suicide	CD
406	2009	16 Horsepower	Secret South	CD, LP
407	2010	Zale Dalen	Terminal City Ricochet	DVD
408	2010	Various artists	Widower	CD/DVD
409	2009	Alice Donut	Ten Glorious Animals	CD, LP
410	2009	Star Fucking Hipsters	Never Rest in Peace	CD, LP
411	2009	Jello Biafra and the Guantanamo School of Medicine	The Audacity of Hype	CD, LP
412	2010	Triclops!	Helpers On The Other Side	CD, LP
413	2010	Slim Cessna's Auto Club	Buried Behind the Barn	EP
414	2010	Jucifer	Throned in Blood	LP
415	2010	Git Some	Loose Control	CD, LP
416	2010	Akimbo	Jersey Shores	LP
417	2010	Slim Cessna's Auto Club	Jesus Let Me Down	LP
418	2010	Dash Rip Rock	Call Of The Wild	CD
419	2010	Fish Karma	Halloween in America	CD
420	2010	Knights of the New Crusade	Knight Vision -- Hymns For The Invisible Church	LP
421	2010	Munly & The Lupercalians	Petr & The Wulf	CD, LP
422	2010	Articles of Faith	New Normal Catastrophe	EP
423	2012	Pins of Light	II	CD, LP
424	2011	Citizen Fish	Goods	CD, LP
425	2011	Slim Cessna's Auto Club	Unentitled	CD, LP
426	2011	Noam Chomsky	The Noam Chomsky Box	CD
427	2011	Fuel Injected .45	Past Demo-ns	CD
428	2011	Various artists	Ranters, Reformers & Raconteurs Volume 1	CD
429	2011	Various artists	Ranters, Reformers & Raconteurs Volume 2	CD
430	2011	Jello Biafra and the Guantanamo School of Medicine	Enhanced Methods of Questioning	EP
431	2011	Various artists	Black Power & Liberation Struggles	CD
432	2011	Voivod	To the Death!...	CD, LP
433				
434	2011	Hard-Ons with Neil Hamburger	Never Rest in Peace	7"
435	2012	Cross Stitched Eyes	Decomposition	CD, LP
436	2012	Unsane	Wreck	CD, LP
437	2012	The Dicks	Kill from the Heart	CD, LP
438	2012	The Dicks	These People	CD, LP
439	2012	Alice Donut	Freaks in Love	CD
440	2012	Git Some	Git Some	7"
441	2012	Dead Ending	Dead Ending	EP
442	2012	The Dicks	Peace?	7"
443	2012	Kylesa	To Walk a Middle Course	LP
444	2012	Kylesa	Time Will Fuse Its Worth	LP
445	2012	Victims Family	Have a Nice Day	7"
446	2012	Jello Biafra and the Guantanamo School of Medicine	Shock-U-Py!	EP
447	2012	Fish Karma	Lethal Fairy Tales	DI
448	2012	Dead Ending	DE II	EP
449	2012	Dash Rip Rock	Black Liquor	CD
450	2013	Jello Biafra and the Guantanamo School of Medicine	White People and the Damage Done	CD, DI, LP
451	2013	Akimbo	Live to Crush	DI, LP
452	2013	Death Hymn Number 9	3rd Degree Moon Burns	DI, LP
453	2013	Turn Me on Dead Man	We Are The Star People	DI, LP
454	2015	Really Red	Teaching You the Fear	DI, LP
455	2015	Really Red	Rest in Pain	DI, LP
456	2015	Really Red	New Strings for Old Puppets	DI, LP
457	2015	Really Red	Teaching You The Fear: The Complete Collection 1979-1985	CD, DI
458	2013	Ultra Bide	DNA vs DNA-c	CD, DI, LP
459	2013	Frantix	My Dad's a Fuckin' Alcoholic	CD, DI, LP
460	2013	The Dot Wiggin Band	Ready! Get! Go!	CD, DI, LP
461	2013	Jucifer	За Волгой для нас земли нет	DI, LP
462	2014	Peace Creep	Peace Creep	EP
463	2014	Ani Kyd	En·tan·gle	EP
464	2014	Ratos de Porão	Século Sinistro	CD, DI, LP
465	2014	ArnoCorps	Two More!	7"
466	2014	ArnoCorps	The Greatest Band of All Time	CD, DI
467	2014	Itchy-O	Burn the Navigator	CD, DI, LP
468	2014	Stanley Boucher	Watcher in Black and Other Poems	Book
469	2015	Really Red	Too Political	DI
470	2014	The World/Inferno Friendship Society	This Packed Funeral	CD, DI, LP
471	2015	Mischief Brew	This Is Not for Children	CD, DI, LP
472	2015	Jucifer	District of Dystopia	DI, LP
473	2016	Dead Ending	"Class War"/"Ivanka Wants Her Orange Back"	7"
474	2018	The Darts	"Subsonic Dream"/"Bullet"	7"
475	2015	Jello Biafra and the New Orleans Raunch & Soul All Stars	"Fannie Mae"/"Just a Little Bit"	7"
476	2015	Legendary Shack Shakers	The Southern Surreal	CD, DI, LP
477	2019	The Silver Machine	Standing on the Bare Ground	DI, LP
478	2016	Feral Ohms	"I Fall"/"Sweetbreads"	7"
479	2016	Métal Urbain	"Panik"/"Lady Coca Cola"	7"
480	2016	Culture Shock	Attention Span	CD, DI, LP
481	2016	Evan Johns	Panoramic Life	DI
482	2016	Evan Johns	Somewhere Over the Skyline	DI
483	2016	Pansy Division	Quite Contrary	CD, LP, DI
484	2016	Pansy Division	"Blame the Bible"	7", DI
485	2017	Disaster Strikes	In the Age of Corporate Personhood	CD, LP, DI
486				
487				
488				
489	2017	ArnoCorps	The Ballsy	EP
490	2017	ArnoCorps	The Fantastic	EP
491	2017	ArnoCorps	The Unbelievable	CD, LP, DI
492	2017	Itchy-O	From the Overflowing	CD, DI, LP
493	2017	Pachinko	State Your Grievances	DI
494	2017	Dead Ending	Shoot the Messenger	DI, LP
495	2018	Fish Karma/The DeRailleurs	Time To Say Goodbye	DI
496	2019	Dead Ending	"(It's Not) What You Believe"/"Painkiller"	7", DI
497	2019	EX-Girl	"The Crown of Dr. Keroninstein"	7"
498	2019	The Darts	I Like You But Not Like That	CD, DI, LP
499	2019	ArnoCorps	Welcome to the Gym!	7", DI
500				
501	2019	Tsunami Bomb	The Spine That Binds	CD, LP, DI
502	2020	The World/Inferno Friendship Society	All Borders Are Porous to Cats	CD, LP, DI
