= Trouble in Town =

Trouble in Town may refer to:

- "Trouble in Town" (Coldplay song), a song by Coldplay off the album Everyday Life
- "Trouble in Town" (East Bay Ray song), a song by East Bay Ray
- Trouble in Town (East Bay Ray record), a 7" record by East Bay Ray published by Alternative Tentacles; see Alternative Tentacles discography
- JumpStart 3D Virtual World: Trouble in Town, an educational videogame
- "Trouble in Town" (TV episode), a 1953 episode of The Lone Ranger; see List of The Lone Ranger episodes
- "The Trouble in Town" (TV episode), an episode of Shiva (TV series)

== See also ==
- Trouble Town
- Trouble (disambiguation)
- Town (disambiguation)
