= Sore =

Sore may refer to:

- Ulcer (dermatology), a sore on the skin or a mucous membrane
- Sore, a mild pain or ache
- Sore (album), by Buzzov*en
- Sore (band), an Indonesian rock band
- Sore, Landes, a village in the Landes département of France
- Sore, a slang term for angry
- Sore: Wife from the Future, 2025 film by Yandy Laurens

== See also ==
- Cold sore
- Sores, a surname
