= These People =

These People may refer to:

- These People (Richard Ashcroft album)
- These People (The Dicks album)
- "These People", a song by Sheppard, from the album Bombs Away
