= Walk on Jindal's Splinters =

Live album by Jello Biafra & the Raunch and Soul All-Stars
- Released: May 12, 2015
- Recorded: May 8, 2011
- Genre: New Orleans soul, garage rock
- Length: 42:00
- Label: Alternative Tentacles
- Producer: Marshall Lawless

Walk on Jindal's Splinters is a live album by Jello Biafra and the Raunch and Soul All-Stars, a group of Southern musicians assembled especially for the occasion by Dash Rip Rock's Bill Davis and Cowboy Mouth's Fred LeBlanc. The album title is a play on the Dr. John song "I Walk on Gilded Splinters" meant to insult now-former Louisiana governor Bobby Jindal.

== Album history ==
The live performance captured on this recording resulted from Davis and LeBlanc inviting Biafra to perform a variety of New Orleans soul classics with a loose congregation of musicians during the New Orleans Jazz & Heritage Festival. Biafra encouraged Davis and LeBlanc to include some New Orleans-related garage rock songs in the set as well as an Alex Chilton cover to honor the then-recently deceased singer.

The all-star backing band includes Pepper Keenan (Corrosion of Conformity, Down) on guitar, Pete "Wet Dog" Gordon (formerly of Mojo Nixon's backing band The Toadliquors, who had previously played with Biafra on his 1994 collaboration with Nixon, Prairie Home Invasion), Brian "Bruiser" Broussard formerly of Dash Rip Rock and Supagroup, currently in Cowboy Mouth on bass and he also "tour managed" the show. The horn section was organized by Morning 40 Federation baritone saxophonist Josh Cohen that included members of both Morning 40 Federation and Egg Yolk Jubilee.

The live multi-track recording, initially thought to be unusable after a rough reference mix was completed and other technical issues (the introduction of the band's rendition of Jessie Hill's "Ooh Poo Pah Doo" was not recorded, a mistake apologized for on the album's liner notes), were successfully edited and mixed down by producer/engineer Ben Mumphrey, who had attended the show and offered his services to Biafra for the project. Mumphrey did the editing and mixing on his own downtime at Studio in the Country in Washington Parish, Louisiana (where he is the facility's general manager and chief engineer) between other commitments.

The album's release was preceded by a seven-inch single (Alternative Tentacles's first single release with a jukebox hole) featuring renditions of Buster Brown's "Fannie Mae" and Rosco Gordon's "Just a Little Bit", released on April 14, 2015. The 45 was originally planned to be issued on Record Store Day, but was rejected because Record Store Day's organizers were deemphasizing seven-inch singles in that year's promotion; Alternative Tentacles semi-facetiously claimed on their website that Record Store Day had found the 45 "too hot to handle", and issued the single, already planned to be packaged in a generic brown 45 sleeve in homage to independent R&B and rock 45s of the late 50s and early 60s, with a large sticker reading "REJECTED BY RECORD STORE DAY".

== Track listing ==
Except for where otherwise noted, the songwriter is also the artist who originally recorded the song. In instances where the songwriter will have used a pseudonym as an artist and his real name as a songwriter, both names are respectively listed.

Side one

1. "Ooh-Poo-Pah-Doo" (Jessie Hill)
2. "House of the Rising Sun" (traditional, arranged by Alan Price) (Cover version of The Animals's adaption of the song)
3. "(Don't Mess With) My Toot Toot" (Sidney Simien) (Rockin' Sidney cover)
4. "Mother-in-Law" (Allen Toussaint) (Ernie K-Doe cover)
5. "Bangkok" (Alex Chilton)
6. "Judy in Disguise (With Glasses)" (John Fred/Andrew Bernard) (John Fred and His Playboy Band cover)

Side two

1. "Land of 1,000 Dances" (Chris Kenner)
2. "Working in a Coal Mine" (Allen Toussaint) (Lee Dorsey cover)
3. "Walk on Gilded Splinters" (Mac Rebennack) (Dr. John cover)

The CD and digital download edition of the album switches the order of "Land of 1,000 Dances" and "Working in a Coal Mine" in the track sequence, and appends the "Fannie Mae"/"Just a Little Bit" single as bonus tracks.

== Personnel ==
Musicians

- Jello Biafra – lead vocals
- Bill Davis – guitar, vocals, percussion
- Fred LeBlanc – drums, guitar
- Pete "Wet Dog" Gordon – digital keyboard (credited on the album as playing "Pumpin' Piano"; Gordon used an organ sound for "House of the Rising Sun" and a piano sound for the rest of the tracks)
- Brian "Bruiser" Broussard – bass
- Pepper Keenan – guitar
- Josh Cohen – baritone sax
- Paul Grass – tenor sax
- Eric Belletto – trumpet
- Glen Barberot – sousaphone
- Mike Joseph – baritone horn
- Rich Siegel – emcee

Production personnel

- Marshall Lawless – producer
- Ben Mumphrey – editing, mixing, "creative archeology"
- B.J. Lehn – live recording
