= Doc Corbin Dart =

American musician (born 1953)

- Also known as: 26
- Born: March 16, 1953 (age 73)
- Genres: Punk rock, folk, alternative rock
- Occupation: Musician
- Instrument: Vocals
- Years active: 1978–present
- Labels: Crustacean Records; Alternative Tentacles
- Formerly of: The Crucifucks

Doc Corbin Dart (born March 16, 1953) is an American musician and former vocalist of the 1980s Lansing, Michigan punk rock band the Crucifucks. As of the early 2000s, he is also known by his moniker 26.

Dart's unorthodox vocal stylings have been described as wailing and alarming, while others have described them favorably as heartfelt and influenced by Pete Shelley of iconic UK punk group Buzzcocks. His lyrics alternate between personal themes of abandonment and depression, and an anarchist worldview.

== Musical career ==
=== The Crucifucks ===
In 1982, The Crucifucks formed and signed to Jello Biafra's Alternative Tentacles Records. They released the self-titled The Crucifucks a year later followed up with Wisconsin. In 1992, these records were re-released as a CD titled Our Will Be Done.

The back cover of Our Will Be Done featured a photo of what Dart believed was a slain policeman; the photo was actually from a Philadelphia Police Department drill. Doc is perhaps best known for the 1996 lawsuit filed over the use of this photo. The Philadelphia chapter of the Fraternal Order of Police sued the Crucifucks, Alternative Tentacles, Jello Biafra, and Borders Inc. alleging libel and slander. The trial court awarded a $2.2 million default judgment which was vacated on appeal the following year.

In 1998, The Crucifucks reformed and did a brief national tour, including a performance at Alternative Tentacles' 20th Anniversary Party. They also released their first CD in nearly a decade, called L.D. Eye; which dealt with themes such as the Oklahoma City bombing, U.S. wars in the Middle East, the Irish Republican Army, suicide, and police brutality.

=== Solo material ===
Doc Dart has recorded several solo projects: Patricia (1990, Alternative Tentacles, LP/cassette only) and 'Black Tuesday' (1991, self-released, cassette only). In 2002 he started a new project called LD Eye. In 2004 he changed his name to 26 and released a solo CD, The Messiah on Madison, Wisconsin's Crustacean Records. Dart opened up for Jello Biafra on his 'I Blow Minds For A Living' Spoken Word Tour.

== Personal life ==
In 1989, Dart was a candidate for mayor of Lansing on a platform of police reform. Dart stated he would appoint a citizen's commission to hear complaints about officers. "We'll weed out the bad ones," he said. "If we have to weed out the bad officers, we'll do it." He stated that police hassle citizens and focus on petty crimes while not paying enough attention to rape and other serious offenses. He also pledged half of the $67,000 Mayor's salary to set up a rape counseling and education center. He finished third of three in the August 8, 1989 city primary election with 5% of the vote.

Dart continues to be a mainstay of alternative culture in Lansing, Michigan, regularly showing up in local papers. For a long time, Dart ran a baseball card store in a small collection of shops on Michigan Avenue. These shops were located near Sparrow Hospital, where he petitioned the city to open a women's crisis center, serving as one of its original board members.

Currently residing in Okemos, Michigan, Dart created a stir with his anti-American sentiments following the September 11 attacks. Signs attached to the front of his home read, in part, "U.S. Troops terrorize as cowards from the skies. They should be in body bags." He is also a supporter of the Animal Liberation Front.

Dart has borderline personality disorder and his first solo album, Patricia, was named after his therapist.

Dart is the son of Rollin Dart, former chair of Dart National Bank, cousins of the Dart Container family. Dart is divorced and has two children.
