= Stephen Moses =

American drummer

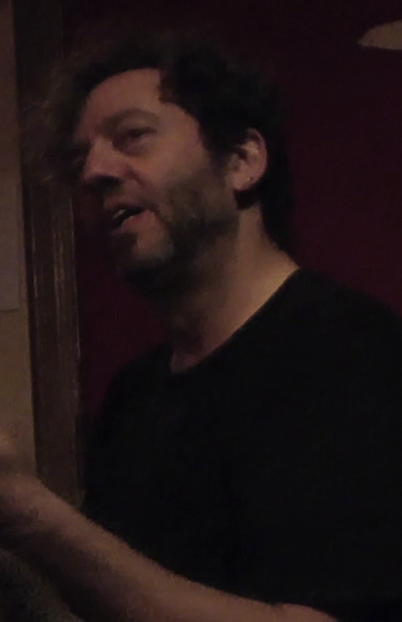

Background information
- Born: November 29, 1954 (age 71); Queens, New York
- Instruments: drums, trombone

Stephen Moses (born November 29, 1954) is a rock drummer and a trombonist. He is a founding member of Alice Donut, and also currently plays with Time Trout, Mustafina, GoJuMo, MJ12 with Percy Jones and Rosenbloom. He has recorded with a number of artists over the years, and has played trombone on five albums by Sour Jazz.

== Partial discography ==
- see Alice Donut
- Love God soundtrack
- Scratch
- Blind Melon - Soup (song: "St Andrew's Fall")
- Voltaire (musician) - Almost Human
- Voltaire - BooHoo (projekt 129, 2002)
- Voltaire - Then and Again (projekt 162, 2004)
- Gary Windo - Deep Water (Antilles, 1988)
- Sour Jazz - No Values (1999)
- Sour Jazz - Lost For Life (2001)
- Sour Jazz - Dressed To the Left (2001)
- Sour Jazz - Rock & Roll Ligger (2005)
- Sour Jazz - American Seizure (2009)
- CRAWLPAPPY - Crawlpappy (Blackout!, 1990, BL-6C)
- TIME TROUT - OTOROKU (2023)
- MJ12 - MJ12 (Gonzo Multimedia HST402CD, 2015)
- BC35 - BC35 Volume Two (Bronson Recordings BRCD/004, 2019)
- LAMBIC c&p lambic music (2006)
- Giant Metal Insects gopher size buzz TOC-GMI ep (1991)
