= At a Loss =

…At a Loss

Studio album by Buzzov*en
- Released: May 5, 1998
- Recorded: September 1997; Tapeworm Studios (Miami, Florida)
- Genre: Sludge metal
- Length: 77:59
- Label: Off the Records, Emetic Records
- Producer: Billy Anderson

Buzzov*en chronology
Sore (1994)	…At a Loss (1998)	Welcome to Violence (2005)

Professional ratings
Review scores
Source	Rating
AllMusic	4/5 stars

…At a Loss is the third album by American sludge metal band Buzzoven, released on May 5, 1998, by Off the Records. The album was reissued in 2010 on vinyl and CD through Emetic Records.

== Track listing ==
No.	Title	Length
1.	"...At a Loss"	2:32
2.	"A Lack of"	3:56
3.	"Kakkila"	3:28
4.	"Loricet"	3:55
5.	"Flow"	1:48
6.	"Crawl Away"	6:19
7.	"Whiskey Fit"	2:39
8.	"Don't Bring Me Down" (Electric Light Orchestra cover)	4:39
9.	"Dirtkickers"	2:53
10.	"Red/Green" (Big Boys cover)	2:49
11.	"Useless"	5:08
12.	"Heal"	1:33
13.	"Left Behind"	36:20

"Left Behind" ends at 7:34 with the final half hour ending in one droning, vibrating guitar effect with the main riff playing very softly in the background.

== Personnel ==
- "Reverend Dirtkicker a.k.a. Kirk Oven" – vocals, guitar
- "Dixie" – bass, vocals
- "Simple" – drums
- Billy Anderson – production, engineering
- Jeremy Dubois – additional engineering
- Arik Moonhawk Roper – cover art
- T.roy sourvein – samples
