= Rollin Dart =

Rollin Bashford Dart
- Born: December 2, 1925; Mason, Michigan
- Died: May 5, 2016 (aged 90)
- Occupation: Banker
- Spouse: Mary Vay Corbin (m. 1948)

Rollin Bashford Dart (December 2, 1925 – May 5, 2016) was an American banker.

== Family ==
Dart was the grandson of Rollin Charles "RC" Dart, who founded Dart National Bank in 1925. He was the son of Doc Campbell Dart, who was chief executive officer of the bank from 1943 to 1960.

He was the father of punk rock musician Doc Corbin Dart. He was also related to the family that founded Dart Container.

== Early life and education ==
Dart was born on December 2, 1925, in Mason, Michigan to Doc C. Dart and Zola Bashford Dart. He graduated from Mason High School in 1943. He was active in the Boy Scouts of America and became an Eagle Scout. In the spring of 1943, the joined the U. S. Marine Corps, serving in the Asiatic-Pacific Theater at Iwo Jima. After his return in 1946, he attended Michigan Agricultural College at Michigan State University for 2 years.

Rollin married Mary Vay Corbin on March 28, 1948.

== Career ==
Dart was the chairman of Dart National Bank from 1962 to 2005 and its president from 1962 to 1999. During Rollin's tenure, the assets of the bank increased from $8 million to $180 million.

Dart continued to serve the bank as Chairman Emeritus and Community Relations Officer until his death.

== Affiliations ==
Dart was a member of Rotary International and raised funds for the eradication of polio and led singing at weekly meetings. He was a member of the First Presbyterian Church of Mason, where he served as a deacon and elder and in the choir.
