= Calling All Cars on the Vegas Strip =

Studio album by Jucifer
- Released: 1998
- Recorded: 1995–1997
- Genre: Sludge metal; doom metal; grunge; hardcore punk; alternative metal
- Length: 45:06
- Label: Crack Rock (1998) Capricorn (2000)

Jucifer chronology
Calling All Cars on the Vegas Strip (1998)	I Name You Destroyer (2002)

Calling All Cars on the Vegas Strip is the debut studio album by the American band Jucifer. It was released in 1998 through the independent label Crack Rock Records and then in 2000 after have signed to Capricorn Records label. The album contains a mixture of metal, punk, hardcore, doom, sludge, alternative elements and scratch disk sound effects between track to track. This style wasn't explored by many bands in the late 1990s, and was part of their sound during the 2000s, until the release of Throned in Blood in 2010.

== Critical reception ==
Professional ratings
Review scores
Source	Rating
AllMusic	2.5/5 stars

Steve Huey for AllMusic said that the album overall "draws on the grungy noise of early alternative metal...and the loud, trashy sometimes industrial-tinged scuzz rock that preceded it." Craig Regala for Lollipop Magazine called the album an "interesting combination of sludgy and grungy riffs smut backed by real straight-up, small-kit drumming and a focus on rough-cut songs."

== Track listing ==
All tracks are written by Jucifer.

No.	Title	Length
1.	"Code Escovedo"	3:23
2.	"Long Live the King"	2:16
3.	"Superman"	3:03
4.	"Malibu"	3:40
5.	"To the Plate"	1:44
6.	"44: Dying in White"	3:29
7.	"Nickel to Roll"	3:04
8.	"Glamourspuss"	2:05
9.	"A More Luminous Skin"	3:01
10.	"Hero Worship"	2:16
11.	"Rain and Pink Chiffon"	4:49
12.	"Model Year Blowout"	4:14
13.	"The Movement of Swallows"	5:29
14.	"Japanese and Lovely"	2:33

== Personnel ==
- Amber Valentine – guitar, vocals, organ, vibraphone
- Edgar Livengood – drums, horns, violin, vocals
