= If Thine Enemy Hunger =

Studio album by Jucifer
- Released: September 5, 2006
- Recorded: 2004
- Studio: The Bakery in Athens, Georgia
- Genre: Doom metal, stoner metal, indie rock, grunge
- Length: 56:27
- Label: Relapse
- Producer: Jucifer

Jucifer chronology
I Name You Destroyer (2002)	If Thine Enemy Hunger (2006)	L'Autrichienne (2008)

Professional ratings
Review scores
Source	Rating
The A.V. Club	B-
Exclaim!	(Positive)
Pitchfork	6.6/10 stars
Pop Matters	(6/10)

If Thine Enemy Hunger is the third full-length studio album by American metal band Jucifer. The album's title is a reference to a phrase used in Romans 12:20.

== Background ==
The album's title is referential to the Biblical verse of Romans 12:20, of which the King James Version reads, "Therefore if thine enemy hunger, feed him; if he thirst, give him drink: for in so doing thou shalt heap coals of fire on his head."

Coincinding with the album's release, Jucifer released music videos for "Pontius of Palia" and "Hennin Hardine". The band also promoted this album by going on a 21-date United States concert tour between August and October 2007.

All songs are sung in English, with the exception of "Luchamos", which is in Spanish.

== Track listing ==
All tracks are written by Jucifer.

No.	Title	Length
1.	"She Tides the Deep"	7:39
2.	"Centralia"	4:46
3.	"Lucky Ones Burn"	4:16
4.	"Hennin Hardine"	3:56
5.	"Antietam"	4:29
6.	"My Benefactor"	2:27
7.	"Four Suns"	3:06
8.	"Pontius of Palia"	3:12
9.	"Backslider"	2:50
10.	"Luchamos" (Eng. "We Fight")	2:09
11.	"Ludlow"	4:08
12.	"The Plastic Museum"	2:53
13.	"In a Family Way"	2:35
14.	"Medicated"	4:27
15.	"Led"	3:34

== Credits ==
=== Jucifer ===
- Amber Valentine – vocals and guitar
- Edgar Livengood – drums

=== Production ===
- Jucifer – arrangements, production
- David Gardner – mastering

=== Imagery ===
- Jucifer – photography and design
- Orion Landau – design
