= I Name You Destroyer =

Studio album by Jucifer
- Released: June 18, 2002
- Recorded: 1999–2000
- Genre: Sludge metal, doom metal, indie rock
- Length: 49:01
- Label: Velocette Records

Jucifer chronology
Calling All Cars on the Vegas Strip (1998)	I Name You Destroyer (2002)	If Thine Enemy Hunger (2006)

I Name You Destroyer is the second full-length album by the duo, Jucifer released on June 18, 2002 through Velocette Records.

== Critical reception ==
Professional ratings
Review scores
Source	Rating
AllMusic	3/5 stars

Robert Doerschuk for AllMusic described the album as the band "unleashing a mountain of passionate sound with strong punk references as well as several intriguing departures from the style." Patrick Shabe for PopMatters called the album "indie rock for true rockers who love their giant riffs and power chords."

== Track listing ==
All tracks are written by Jucifer.

No.	Title	Length
1.	"Little Fever"	3:31
2.	"Amplifier"	3:19
3.	"Pinned in glass"	2:15
4.	"Queen B"	2:50
5.	"When She Goes Out"	2:36
6.	"Torch"	2:07
7.	"Memphis"	3:46
8.	"Fight Song"	4:31
9.	"Dissolver"	3:59
10.	"Vulture Song"	2:21
11.	"Firefly"	1:54
12.	"Lazing"	5:29
13.	"Surface Tension"	2:40
14.	"Undertow"	6:35
15.	"Sea Blind"	2:42

== Personnel ==
- Amber Valentine – guitar, vocals
- Edgar Livengood – Bass (track 7), drums
- Andy Baker – producer, engineering (tracks: 1 to 12, 15)
- Bill Doss – engineering (tracks: 13, 14)
