= To a Frown =

Studio album by Buzzov*en
- Released: 1993
- Recorded: Razor's Edge Studios; San Francisco, California
- Genre: Sludge metal; noise rock; hardcore punk
- Length: 47:36
- Label: Allied Recordings
- Producer: Billy Anderson; Buzzov*en

Buzzov*en chronology
To a Frown (1993)	Sore (1994)

Professional ratings
Review scores
Source	Rating
AllMusic	3/5 stars

To a Frown is the first studio album by American sludge metal band Buzzov*en, originally released through Allied Recordings in 1993. Out of print, it is available in a remastered form in its entirety on the compilation album Welcome to Violence.

== Track listing ==
- All songs written and arranged by Buzzov*en.
1. "Intro" - 0:06
2. "To a Frown" – 3:28
3. "Shove" – 2:12
4. "Drained" – 5:22
5. "Forget It" – 2:30
6. "Frayed" – 3:38
7. "Splinter My Eye" – 2:04
8. "Wound" – 4:06
9. "Toe Fry" – 2:39
10. "Aching Improv #9" – 3:42
11. "Weeding" – 17:48

== Personnel ==
- Kirk – vocals, electric guitar, Vox Continental Organ
- Igor – bass guitar
- Ash – drums
- Billy Anderson – engineering, production
- Pat Grimple – backing vocals on "Shove" and "Splinter My Eye"
- Harvey Bennett Stafford – cover painting
