= Sores =

Sores is a French surname. Notable people with the surname include:

- Jacques de Sores, sixteenth century French pirate
- Raoul II Sores (died 1282), marshal of France

== See also ==
- Sore (disambiguation)
