= Machine Gun in the Clown's Hand =

Studio album by Jello Biafra
- Released: October 15, 2002
- Recorded: August 3, 2002
- Genre: Spoken word
- Length: 3:11:07
- Label: Alternative Tentacles
- Producer: Jello Biafra

Jello Biafra chronology
The Big Ka-Boom, Pt. 1 (2002)	Machine Gun in the Clown's Hand (2002)	Never Breathe What You Can't See (2004)

Professional ratings
Review scores
Source	Rating
Allmusic	2.5/5 stars

Machine Gun in the Clown's Hand is the eighth spoken word album by Jello Biafra. Topics covered in the album include the war on terrorism, California's energy crisis, and voting problems in Florida. Biafra originally titled the album Osama McDonald (a combination of the names of Osama bin Laden and Ronald McDonald), a name which he was later credited by on the album Never Breathe What You Can't See, which was recorded with The Melvins.

== Track listing ==
Disc 1

No.	Title	Length
1.	"Miscue 911"	4:35
2.	"United We Scam"	7:03
3.	"Flogging the Infidels"	11:34
4.	"Honey, I Blew Up the World"	13:19
5.	"The Big Ka-Boom, Pt. 1"	3:41
6.	"The Pied Piper and the Damage Done"	14:33
7.	"Truth Is Stranger Than Hype"	7:21
8.	"The Terror of Tinytown"	11:13
Total length:		73:19

Disc 2

No.	Title	Length
9.	"Machine Gun in the Clown's Hand"	7:06
10.	"The Great Betrayal"	8:49
11.	"The Martyr That Would Not Die"	6:23
12.	"Propane and Propane Accessories"	4:38
13.	"Faith-Based Initiatives"	13:12
14.	"Fight Terror - Resist Corporations"	4:27
15.	"Be Patriotic - Fight the Government"	9:46
16.	"Beat Around the Burning Bush"	5:10
17.	"Fight Crime - Make Mischief"	11:12
Total length:		70:43

Disc 3

No.	Title	Length
18.	"Cowboy Cornholio and the Sunshine State"	9:30
19.	"...And Gore Made Us Want to Ralph"	7:20
20.	"The Rolling Blackout Revue"	7:08
21.	"12 Steps to Corporate-Free Sobriety"	17:01
22.	"Joey Ramone"	5:44
Total length:		46:43

== Personnel ==
- Jello Biafra - Producer, concept, insert
- Josh Baker - Art producer, construction
- Matt Kelley - Editing
- Christopher Shaw - Insert
- Winston Smith - Insert
- Chuck Sperry - Cover art
- John Yates - Artwork
