= Tragic Mulatto =

Background information
- Origin: San Francisco, California, United States
- Genres: Noise rock; psychedelic rock
- Years active: 1980–1990
- Label: Alternative Tentacles
- Past members: Alistair Shanks; Gail Coulson; Jehu Goder; Karl Konnerth; Marc Galipeau; Daved Marsh; Patrick Marsh; Tim Carroll; Jack-buh; Bambi Nonymous

Tragic Mulatto was an American rock band based in San Francisco, California, United States. Performing under pseudonyms, the band's nucleus consisted of vocalist Flatula Lee Roth (Gail Coulson) and bass guitarist Reverend Elvister Shanksley aka Lance Boyle (Alistair Shanks). The band released their albums on Jello Biafra's label Alternative Tentacles, with Dead Kennedys' bassist Klaus Flouride producing several of their early albums.

Tragic Mulatto's music has been called "Butthole Surfers-esque", their label describing them as "[t]he dark and seedy underbelly of the average big city underbelly. A twilight zone for the already poorly adjusted." Coulson has also received praise for her vocal contributions, with her powerful delivery earning comparisons to Janis Joplin and Grace Slick.

== History ==
Tragic Mulatto formed in 1982, initially consisting of Gail Coulson on saxophone, Alistair Shanks on bass guitar, Karl Konnerth on trumpet, Daved Marsh on vocals and Patrick Marsh on drums. The quintet recorded two records for Alternative Tentacles, an eponymously titled 7" single in 1983 and the EP Judo for the Blind in 1984. Konnerth and the Marsh brothers left the band afterward to pursue other interests.

Coulson and Boyle became the core creative force behind the group and took the stage names Flatula Lee Roth and Reverend Elvister Shanksley respectively. The duo recruited guitarist Tim Carroll of The Dicks (Richard Skidmark) and recorded the album Locos por el Sexo in 1986. Representing a change in musical direction for the band, the album emphasized melody and "enough structural backbone to give the songs non-satirical legitimacy". Spin described them as sounding "like a throbbing punkoid cross between Frightwig, real early Jefferson Airplane, and a fertile war pig from Planet 9".

With new guitarist Jack-buh (Jack Killpatrick) the band expanded their line-up to include dual percussionists Bambi Nonymous and Humpty Doody (Marc Galipeau). After an extensive US tour (with a dip into Canada), they recorded their second album titled Hot Man Pussy, joined also by Jehu Goder on guitar. The album included a cover of "Whole Lotta Love" by Led Zeppelin and exhibited further musical maturity by the band. Their final release, Chartreuse Toulouse, with Jehu on guitar, incorporated psychedelic and Middle Eastern influences. Tragic Mulatto disbanded in 1990 after they had released their third album, with its members pursuing separate projects.

== Live performances ==
The band was infamous for their deliberately perverse live performances, which sometimes consisted of its members performing lewd acts onstage. This lewd imagery exploited the perverse and racist mentality white society had towards mixed-race people, particularly women. Lead vocalist Coulson was known to perform mostly naked, while adorning her breasts with duct tape, polyethylene food wrap and fried eggs, and clothespins. Boyle occasionally performed naked or used a Pink Panther puppet to cover his genitals.

== Discography ==
Studio albums

- Locos por el Sexo (1987, Alternative Tentacles)
- Hot Man Pussy (1989, Alternative Tentacles)
- Chartreuse Toulouse (1990, Alternative Tentacles)

Singles

- Tragic Mulatto (1983, Alternative Tentacles)

EPs

- Judo for the Blind (1984, Alternative Tentacles)

Compilations

- Italians Fall Down and Look Up Your Dress (1989, Alternative Tentacles)
