= Sore (album) =

1994 studio album by Buzzoven

Studio album by Buzzov•en
- Released: 1994
- Recorded: Brilliant Studios; San Francisco, California
- Genre: Sludge metal, crust punk, thrash metal
- Length: 73:04
- Label: Roadrunner
- Producer: Billy Anderson; Kirk Fisher

Buzzov•en chronology
To a Frown (1993)	Sore (1994)	...At a Loss (1998)

Professional ratings
Review scores
Source	Rating
Allmusic	4/5 stars

Sore is the second studio album released by American sludge metal band Buzzov•en in 1994, through Roadrunner Records. It has since gone out of print.

== Track listing ==
1. "Sore" – 9:20
2. "Unwilling to Explain" – 2:16
3. "Hollow" – 5:09
4. "Done" – 2:46
5. "I Don't Like You" – 5:42
6. "Broken" – 6:07
7. "Pathetic" – 6:16
8. "Should I" – 6:20
9. "Behaved" – 2:31
10. "Blinded" – 4:14
11. "Grit" – 2:42
12. "This Is Not ..." – 19:41

== Personnel ==
- Kirk – vocals, guitar, production
- Buddy – guitar
- LeDarrell – bass
- Ash – drums
- Billy Anderson – production, engineering
- George Marino – mastering
- Vigil – backing vocals on "Broken"
- Craig Lima – cover art
