= Itchy-O =

ITCHY-O
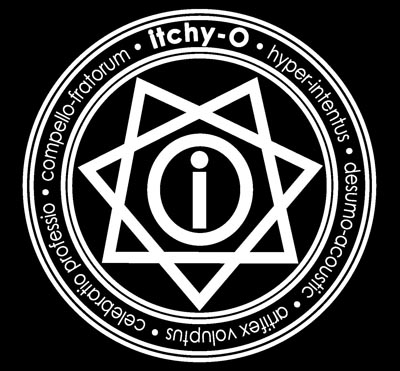

Background information
- Origin: Denver, Colorado, United States
- Genres: Rock, world, electronica, avant-garde, experimental
- Years active: 2003–present
- Label: Alternative Tentacles
- Website: itchyo.com

Itchy-O is a 50–60 member avant-garde music performance collective based in Denver, Colorado. The group is known for its large-scale experiential events that incorporate ritual, rhythm, custom electronics, and chaos-driven spectacle.

== History ==
itchy-O was founded in Denver in 2003 as a solo experimental sound project using animal heartbeats sampled from vinyl. After evolving from a single founder to multiple artists playing live scores to self-produced experimental films, itchy-O developed into a large-scale performance ensemble of over 60 musicians, performers, artist, and engineers. Originally dubbed a “marching band,” the group formally dropped that moniker in 2012 to distance itself from genre and institutional expectations, instead embracing a self-defined ceremonial and experiential format."Itchy-O Marching Band Drops the Marching". Westword.

The collective draws inspiration from ritual traditions, chaos magick, occult arts, electronic sound exploration, rhythmic entrainment, and global percussive practices. It emphasizes collectivism over individual identity and transformation over conventional entertainment.

== Style and performance ==
itchy‑O performances fuse Japanese taiko drums, Western drum‑corps elements, custom electronics (synthesizers, theremins, vocoders), and synchronized choreography. Shows incorporate fog, lasers, fire effects, inflatables, puppetry, and audience interaction—often staged site‑specifically to collapse boundaries between performer and participant.

itchy-O has performed in venues ranging from traditional clubs and concert halls to street performances, planetariums, and drive-in lots. Appearances are often described as “ceremonial chaos,” with emphasis on collective catharsis and altered states of consciousness."Itchy‑O Celebrates 10 Years of Hallowmass". 5280 Magazine. October 2024.

== Artistry and identity ==
itchy-O presents itself as a pseudo-anonymous collective, with all members masked and costumed during performances. While individual members are credited in published works and album materials, no single member speaks on behalf of the group in media or promotional contexts. This approach is rooted in a philosophy that emphasizes art over ego, positioning the collective’s creative output as a unified force rather than a vehicle for individual identity.

The group’s visual identity draws from ritual aesthetics, precision, and symbolic abstraction. Costuming and choreography are used not only to obscure identity but also to create an otherworldly presence that enhances the immersive impact of each performance. This cultivated mystique functions as a creative threshold, inviting audiences into what the group refers to as its “exocosm”—a symbolic universe activated through ceremony, sound, and movement.

By refraining from traditional front-person narratives or identifiable spokespeople, itchy-O reinforces a collective model of artistic production. This structure supports their larger thematic focus on transformation, participation, and altered states of consciousness through multi-sensory experience. The group’s performances are designed to dissolve boundaries between audience and performer, self and spectacle—deploying mystique not as obfuscation, but as an invitation into the unknown.

== Critical reception ==
“Like an Appalachian tent revival performing a Day of the Dead ceremony in the year 2500.” — Westword"Westword Review". Westword. Retrieved 2025-07-22.

“A 50‑member psychedelic electro‑percussion group that turns every performance into a religious experience.” — Noisey / Vice"Vice Live Review". Vice.

== Notable events ==
Hallowmass Since 2015, itchy‑O has produced Hallowmass, an annual participatory ritual in Denver featuring large-scale altar installations and symbolic offerings. The event blends communal catharsis, remembrance, and transformation, and has become central to the group’s evolving mythos.

Drive‑in Radio Baths During COVID‑19 in 2020, itchy‑O presented socially distanced Drive‑In Radio Bath performances, including Sypherlot and a virtual Hallowmass. Audience members remained in vehicles while listening via shortwave radio to a synchronized live broadcast. These performances were later released as the album Sypherlot/Hallowmass 2020: Double Live.

Fantastic Fest (2014–2019) Itchy‑O performed multiple years at Austin’s acclaimed genre film event, Fantastic Fest, contributing surreal and ritualistic performance art experiences that complemented the festival’s cinematic tone. The band’s sets were noted for igniting "mayhem and transformative joy" on the streets outside the Alamo Drafthouse.

International Festivals: Dark Mofo 2016 In 2016, The group played four centerpiece shows in Hobart, Tasmania at MONA FOMA's wintertimefestival.

On September 17, 2021, itchy-O played a surprise set for the grand opening of immersive art exhibition Meow Wolf's Denver location, Convergence Station.

Itchy-O has performed at Riot Fest, Red Rocks Amphitheatre, Austin's Art Outdoors festival, the Stanley Hotel Film Festival, Tucson's All Souls Procession, San Francisco's Day of the Dead Festival, Atlanta's Goat Farm and Denver's Biennial of the Americas. They have played on stage with David Byrne & St. Vincent, and shared billing with Devo, Beats Antique, Warlock Pinchers, Extra Action Marching Band, Dan Deacon, March Fourth, JG Thirlwell and many others.

== Discography ==
Inferno! (Self-released EP, 2011)

Burn the Navigator (LP, 2014, Alternative Tentacles)"Burn the Navigator Review". Alternative Press.

From the Overflowing (LP, 2017, Alternative Tentacles)

Mystic Spy | Psykho Dojo (LP, 2018, Mettle Institute)

Sypherlot/Hallowmass 2020: Double Live (LP, 2021, Alternative Tentacles)

Söm Sâptâlahn (LP, 2025, Mettle Institute)

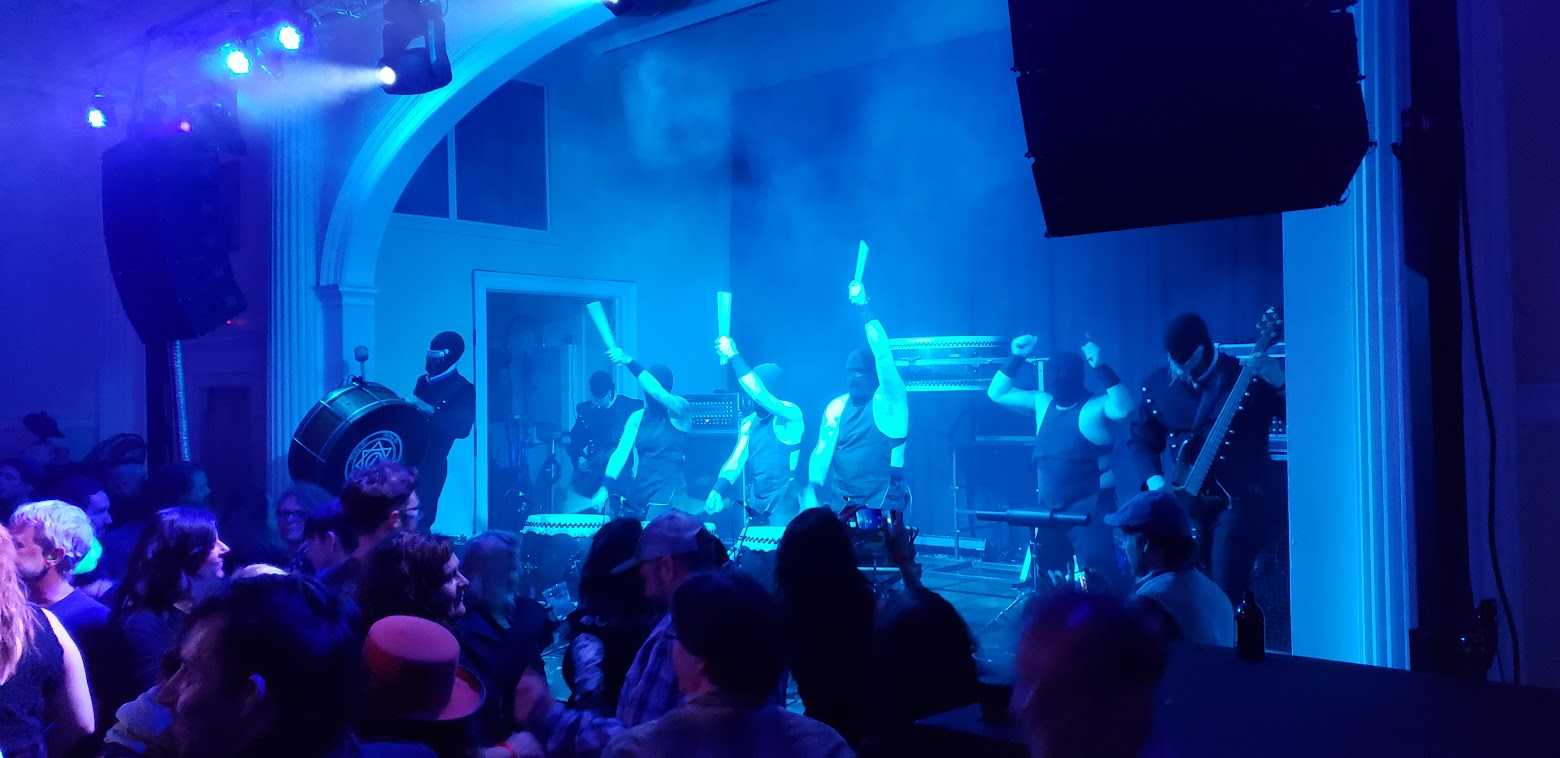
Itchy-O Performance at Stanley Hotel in 2019
