= Jucifer =

American sludge metal band

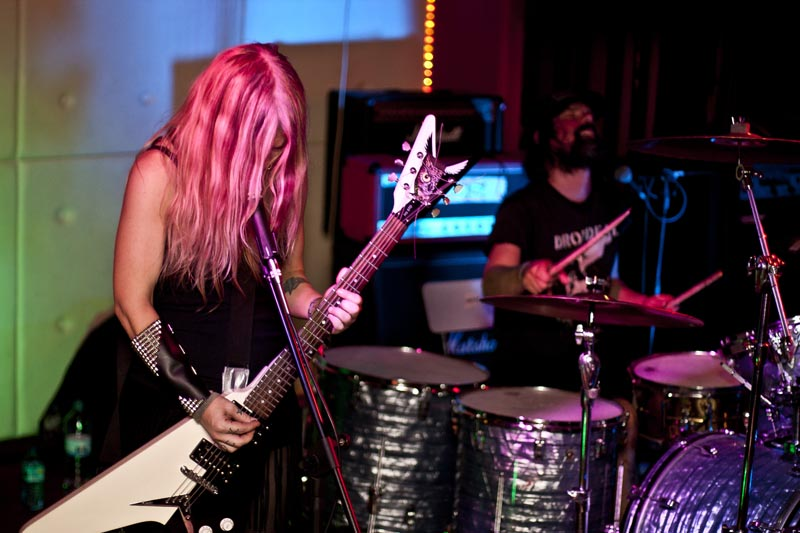
- Jucifer performing in 2012

Background information
- Origin: Athens, Georgia, U.S.
- Genres: Sludge metal, noise rock, alternative metal
- Years active: 1993–present
- Labels: Capricorn, Relapse, Velocette, Nomadic Fortress, Alternative Tentacles
- Members: Gazelle Amber Valentine (guitar, vocals); Edgar Livengood (drums)
- Website: jucifer.net

Jucifer is an American sludge metal duo formed in 1993. The band's members are Gazelle Amber Valentine on lead guitar and vocals and her husband Edgar Livengood on drums. Jucifer is notable for the extreme volume at which they perform, and the gigantic wall of amplification used for Valentine's guitar, as well as the dichotomy that has existed between much of the recorded material and their live shows. They are also notable for incessant touring beginning in the mid-1990s. In 2000 Jucifer moved into an RV and became completely "nomadic in nature", preferring to tour constantly, living in their tour vehicle, rather than following the normal practice of album release/tour/time at home.

The husband-and-wife duo were starring in a film by Derek Cianfrance titled Metalhead, a drama centering on a drummer suffering from hearing loss and learning the meaning of silence. Livengood and Valentine play as themselves acting a fictitious story in the film. The film was in production since 2009 but was cancelled few years later. Cianfrance would later executive produce Sound of Metal, which is a rework of Metalhead co-written and directed by Darius Marder. Although Cianfrance used Jucifer as inspiration for his original plot, which in turn inspired the reworked version, neither film is biographical.

== History ==
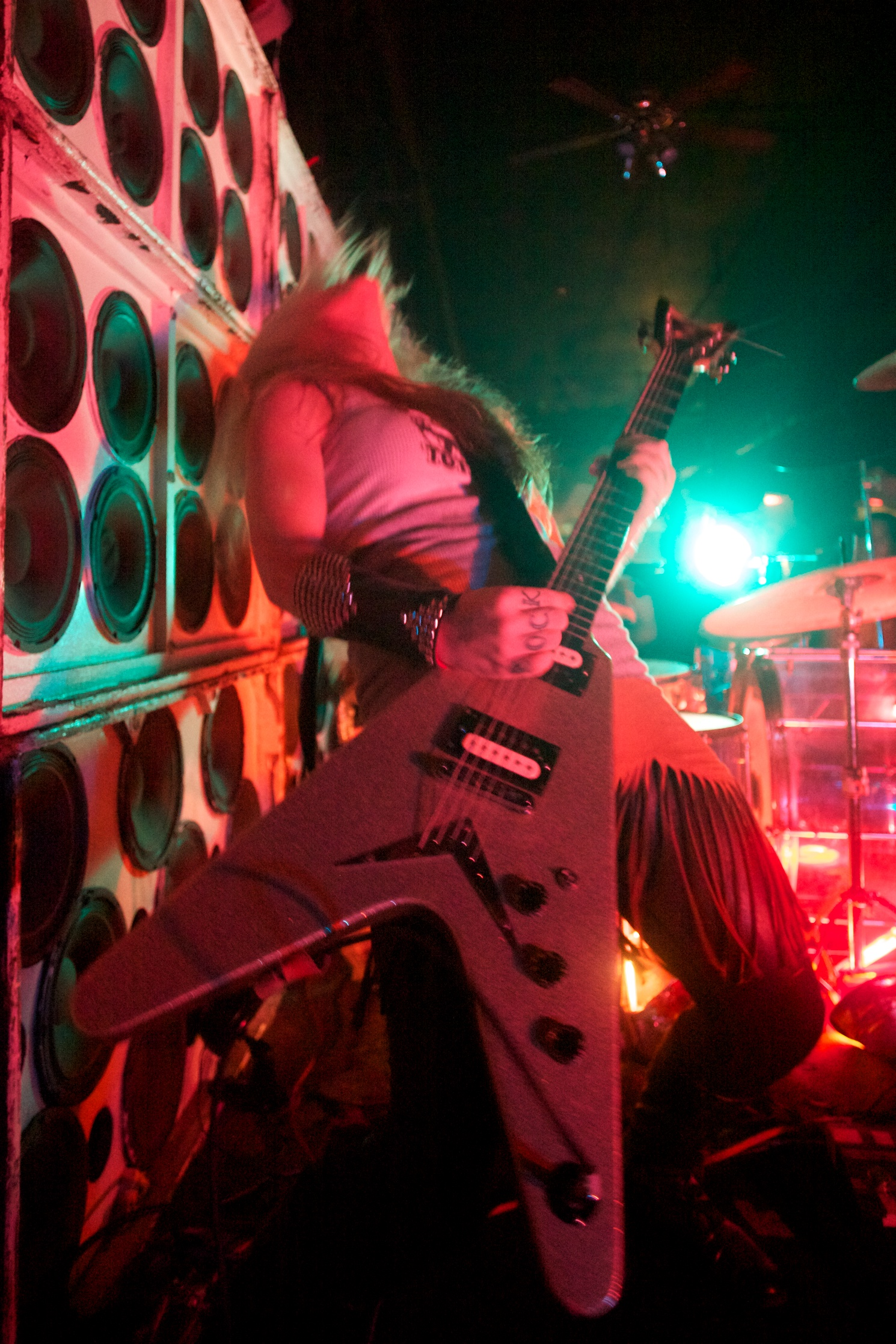
Valentine performing with Jucifer in 2010

Jucifer was formed in 1993 by Gazelle Amber Valentine and Edgar Livengood, who, according to Valentine, coined the band's name from a statement he heard during O. J. Simpson's trials for the murders of Nicole Brown Simpson and Ron Goldman: "If he's guilty, then he's the devil and The Juice is Lucifer." Previous to Jucifer the band had performed under several other names including Starbuck, Satan's Cheerleaders, and Battle Star. In 1994 Jucifer self-released a demo EP on cassette, Nadir. In 1995 a 7" Superman / Licorice was issued by fan run indie label Crack Rock, which also released Jucifer's first studio album, Calling All Cars on the Vegas Strip. After this release, they signed to major label Capricorn Records, which reissued the album in 2000. With Jucifer still signed and awaiting release of its second album recorded in 1999, Capricorn officially went out of business. However a skeleton staff continued under the name Velocette Records, which released extended play EP Lambs in 2001 I Name You Destroyer in 2002 and War Bird in 2004. For their fifth release, If Thine Enemy Hunger, Jucifer signed to Relapse Records,

In March 2008, Jucifer released the double album, L'Autrichienne, which was recorded in July 2007. To support the album, Jucifer embarked on their first tour through Europe.

In 2010 Jucifer founded its own label, Nomadic Fortress Records, and signed a distribution deal with Relapse Records for its output. The band continues to tour constantly, both across North America and returning to Europe in 2010, 2011, 2012, 2013, 2014, 2016, 2017, and 2019.

The album Throned In Blood was released in April 2010 by Nomadic Fortress Records on CD, and on vinyl by Alternative Tentacles. This album channels the raw hostility, black metal, death metal, and especially doom qualities which have dominated Jucifer's live show but more rarely been heard on earlier albums.

In 2011 the demos EP from 1994 Nadir was mastered by Scott Hull and reissued by the digital-only Grindcore Karaoke label. In 2012 Nadir was remastered for vinyl by Brad Boatright and issued on limited marble LPs by Mutants of the Monster.

On July 17, 2013, Jucifer released the album За Волгой для нас земли нет via Nomadic Fortress and Mutants of the Monster. The concept record about the history of Russian city Volgograd (focusing especially on the Battle of Stalingrad) was issued on double vinyl by Alternative Tentacles in October 2013.

Jucifer's studio album entitled District of Dystopia, was released on CD and digital formats by Nomadic Fortress in December 2014. It is a concept album based upon various atrocities committed by the United States government. The album was recorded, engineered, and mastered by the band inside their RV. In October 2015, District of Dystopia was mastered for vinyl by Brad Boatright and released on LP format by Alternative Tentacles.

Jucifer remains nomadic. Their 2013 "Twenty Years Slaying Ears" tour included 32 countries. In 2014 the band performed in the U.S. and U.K. and, in 2015, Jucifer toured the West Coast of the U.S. for the first time since 2012.

In 2015, Jucifer previewed teasers for a "music video biopic" called NOMADS: Build to Destroy which features tour footage and documentary materials filmed and assembled by the band. Livengood is credited with photography and Valentine with editing. The film was slated for a 2017 release.

In January 2019, Jucifer's EP Futility was released.

Jucifer's latest studio album, نظم (Nazm), was released on November 7, 2020. It is a concept album about "the stories of Valentine's life, the lineage of women in her family, and the struggles and resilience of women in every place and time. The ambitious, sprawling double album is also Jucifer's spin on Central Asian and Arabic music"

NPR All Songs Considered selected نظم for their Best Music of November 2020 and described it as "beautifully deep music drawn from an ancient and ever-present bloodline, from one of the heaviest bands on Earth".

== Discography ==
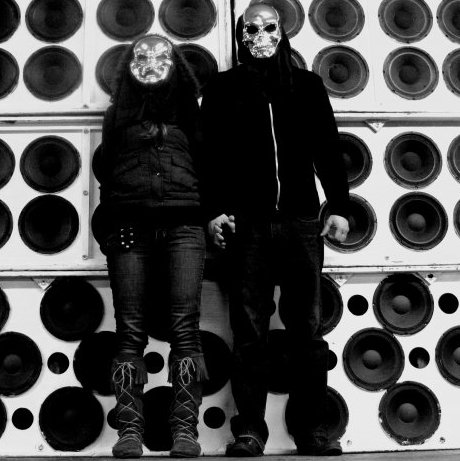
2010 promotional photo for the album Throned in Blood

=== Studio albums ===
- Calling All Cars on the Vegas Strip (1998, Crack Rock records, 2000, Capricorn Records)
- I Name You Destroyer (2002, Velocette Records)
- If Thine Enemy Hunger (2006, Relapse Records)
- L'Autrichienne (2008, Relapse Records, 2xLP via Alternative Tentacles)
- Throned in Blood (2010, Nomadic Fortress Records, distribution through Relapse Records, LP via Alternative Tentacles)
- За Волгой для нас земли нет (2013, Nomadic Fortress Records, Mutants of the Monster, Alternative Tentacles)
- District of Dystopia (2014, Nomadic Fortress Records: 2015, Alternative Tentacles)
- نظم (2020, Nomadic Fortress Records)

=== EPs ===
- Nadir EP (1994, four track demos, self-released)
- Lambs EP (2001, Capricorn Records)
- War Bird EP (2004, Velocette Records)
- Autocannibalist EP released as split cd w/Show of Bedlam (2009, Choking Hazard)
- Nadir reissue, 1994 demos EP (2011, Grindcore Karaoke, 2012, Mutants of the Monster)
- Futility (2019, Nomadic Fortress Records via mp3 and 7" vinyl)

=== Live DVDs ===
- A Partridge In A Pear Tree DVD (2004, AmberVillain Films)
- Veterans of Volume: Live With Eight Cameras (2008, Bare Ruined Films)
