= The Big Ka-Boom, Pt. 1 =

Studio album by Jello Biafra
- Released: April 16, 2002
- Recorded: November 14, 2001
- Genre: Spoken word
- Length: 34:01
- Label: Alternative Tentacles
- Producer: Jello Biafra

Jello Biafra chronology
| Become the Media (2001) | The Big Ka-Boom, Pt. 1 (2002) | Machine Gun in the Clown's Hand (2002) |

Professional ratings
Review scores
| Source | Rating |
|---|---|
| Allmusic | 2.5/5 stars |

The Big Ka-Boom, Pt. 1 is the seventh spoken word album by Jello Biafra.

Recorded at a performance in November 2001 on Biafra's Spitfire Tour, the album consists of a single, 34-minute track discussing Biafra's views on the terrorist attacks of September 11, 2001 and subsequent "war on terror". It was released on April 16, 2002, by Biafra's own Alternative Tentacles label.

== Track listing ==
| No. | Title | Length |
|---|---|---|
| 1. | "The Big Ka-Boom, Pt. 1" | 34:01 |

== Personnel ==
- Jello Biafra – producer, insert
- Matt Kelley – editing
- Marshall Lawless – producer
- Jason Rosenberg – insert
- John Yates – design
