= Judo for the Blind =

EP by Tragic Mulatto
- Released: 1984
- Recorded: Hyde Street Studios, San Francisco, CA
- Genre: Noise rock
- Length: 16:46
- Label: Alternative Tentacles
- Producer: Klaus Flouride

Tragic Mulatto chronology
Tragic Mulatto (1983)	Judo for the Blind (1984)	Locos por el Sexo (1987)

Judo for the Blind is the debut EP of noise rock band Tragic Mulatto, released in 1984 by Alternative Tentacles.

== Music ==
The band's sound has been described as jazz-tinged Flipper.

== Release and reception ==
Despite the band's peculiar demeanor, Judo for the Blind has been received positively. Ira Robbins of the Trouser Press praised the record, saying that "some numbers are faster and well-organized to the point where they resemble a '40s big band on bad drugs; others could be an incompetent jazz combo vainly tuning up while someone soundchecks the microphones."

== Track listing ==
All tracks are written by Tragic Mulatto.

Side one
No.	Title	Length
1.	"Not My Barn Dance"	1:19
2.	"Gossip"	2:12
3.	"Tac Squad"	2:40
4.	"St. OK"	2:13

Side two
No.	Title	Length
1.	"Stop My Hand"	2:37
2.	"900 Foot Jesus"	1:41
3.	"200 Responses, 10 Minutes"	2:12
4.	"Not My Movie"	1:48

== Personnel ==
Adapted from the Judo for the Blind liner notes.

Tragic Mulatto

- Gail Coulson (as A Piece of Eczema) – saxophone, illustrations
- Lance Boyle (as Fluffy) – bass guitar, backing vocals
- Karl Konnerth (as Sweetums) – trumpet
- Daved Marsh (as Flossy) – vocals
- Patrick Marsh (as Blossom) – drums

Production and additional personnel

- John Cuniberti – engineering
- Klaus Flouride – production

== Release history ==
Region	Date	Label	Format	Catalog
United States	1984	Alternative Tentacles	LP	VIRUS 37
