= ArnoCorps =

American rock band

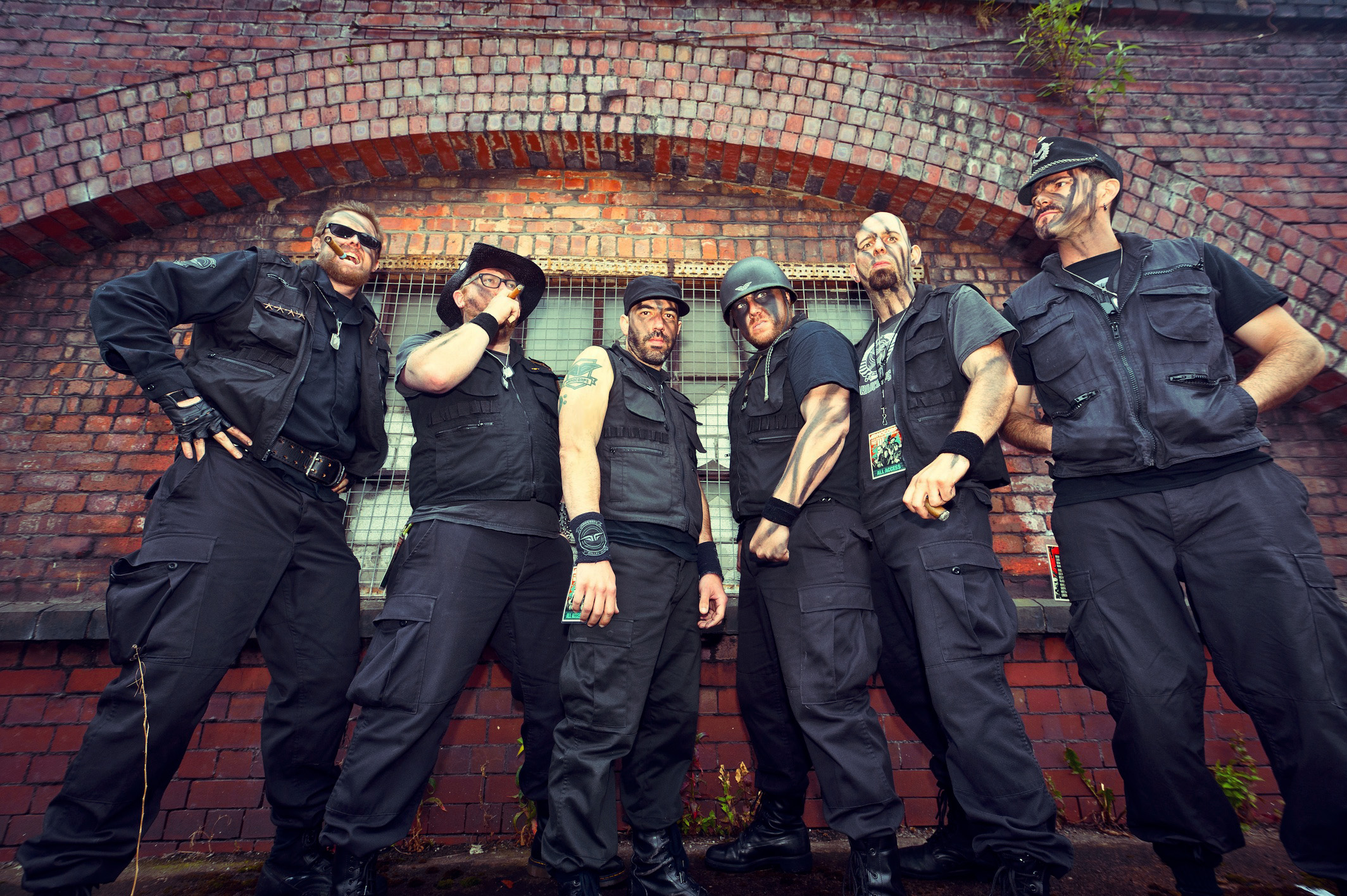
- ArnoCorps in 2012

Background information
- Origin: San Francisco Bay Area
- Genres: Hardcore punk, punk rock
- Years active: 2000–present
- Labels: Alternative Tentacles; Anticulture Records; Vulcan Sky Records; Exactly Records
- Members: Holzfeuer; Erich Nagelbett; Öddum Kriegtroll; Vielmehr Klampfe; Inzo Der Barrakuda; Karl Dichtschnur; Gellend Adler
- Website: www.arnocorps.com

ArnoCorps is a hard rock group based in Oakland, California that exclusively performs songs based on the films of Arnold Schwarzenegger. The focus of the band is on inspirational, humorous and energetic live performances. The stage show features audience involvement, including impromptu bodybuilding competitions and endurance tests.

== Career ==
After releasing two self-produced EPs in 2000 and 2001, ArnoCorps built a fan following in the San Francisco Bay Area. The band's full length concept album was announced for release in 2005, titled The Greatest Band Of All Time. British metal label Anticulture Records released the album in the UK and Europe in February 2006. After receiving critical praise in British magazines such as Metal Hammer and Total Guitar, along with mainstream radio airplay on BBC Radio 1, ArnoCorps headlined tours of the UK and Ireland.

The first tour earned the band a 10 out of 10 rating from the BBC for a performance in Manchester, England, an appearance on commercial radio station Kerrang! 105.2 and a rave review of their London show in the October 2006 issue of Bizarre. In 2008, ArnoCorps was voted "Best San Francisco (local) Rock Band" by the readers of SF Weekly.

The band started a Kickstarter campaign to fund their latest project, The Fantastic EP, which covers the Conan films among other new tracks.

== Musical style ==
The lyrics of ArnoCorps songs have a particular emphasis on Schwarzenegger's action roles from the 1980s such as The Terminator, Predator and Total Recall, with many of the lyrics retelling movie dialogue and plots, similar to The Misfits' lyrical focus on horror films and B-movies.

As a further part of their concept, ArnoCorps make tongue-in-cheek claims of being inspired by ancient folklore and mythology originating from the alps of their "native" Austria, suggesting that there are actually sociological and philosophical topics being addressed in their lyrics. As part of a publicity stunt, the band accused several Hollywood movie studios with "stealing" the mythology of Austria for plot material. In 2004, the band attempted to launch a class-action lawsuit against the studios on behalf of the Austrian people, although the case failed to go to court.

== Live performances ==
The band combines a military-centric appearance with a musical style rooted in both hardcore punk (particularly skate punk) and heavy metal. Describing their music as "Action Adventure Hardcore Rock and Roll", the focus of the band is on energetic live performances which feature interaction with the audience. Attendees and fans are referred to by the band as "Goddamn Heroes and Sheroes."

The band's stage show sees all six members dressed specifically in combat fatigues and camouflage paint (inspired by the movies Predator and Commando) and address the audience in "ballsy" accents. Each band member uses a pseudonym and have heroic backstories. ArnoCorps often performs with two bass players in their line-up (an arrangement they refer to as "heroic symmetry").

== Discography ==
- ArnoCorps EP01 (2000)
- ArnoCorps EP02 (2001)
- The Greatest Band Of All Time (2005 US, 2006 UK)
- The Ballsy EP (2009)
- The 2001 EP (2011 Re-release of remastered and remixed select tracks from EP01 and EP02)
- Two More! (2012)
- The Fantastic EP (2013)
- The Unbelievable (2017)
- Welcome to the Gym! (2019)

== Current lineup ==
- Holzfeuer - Vocals
- Erich Nagelbett - Guitar
- Vielmehr Klampfe - Guitar
- Öddum Kriegtroll - Guitar
- Inzo Der Barrakuda - Lead Bass
- Karl Dichtschnur - Low Bass
- Gellend Adler - Drums

=== Past members ===
- Der Wölf
- Schlagbolzen
- Halstucha
- Toten Adler
- Baron Von Trotz

== See also ==
- Austrian Death Machine
