= Really Red =

American punk band

Really Red was one of Houston, Texas' first punk bands and existed from 1978 through 1985.

== Biography ==
The Really Red line up consisted of John Paul Williams on bass guitar, Ronnie "U-Ron" Bond vocalist/lyricist, Bob Weber on drums and Kelly Younger on guitar. Under occasional variations of their names, these were the original and only band members. Really Red evolved into one of the most prominent and popular Texas punk bands of that era and helped to kick-start the early punk scene in Houston and Texas. Really Red toured the United States several times and played some dates in Canada, including a benefit for the Squamish Five in Vancouver.

Along with their "paying gigs" they were known to do benefit shows for causes as diverse as The Nuclear Freeze Campaign, the Canadian Squamish Five Legal Defense, KPFT radio or even for a vet bill for an injured dog. They started their own independent record label, C.I.A. Records. Really Red toured extensively with DOA and Articles of Faith and they also were billed with many bands of note including, but not limited to, John Cale, Dead Kennedys, SPK, The Effigies, Bad Brains, Circle Jerks, The Stranglers, Dayglo Abortions, 999, Big Boys, The Dicks, MDC, Negative Approach, the Butthole Surfers, Sado Nation, Die Kreuzen, Personality Crisis, Culturcide, Mr Epp and the Fastbacks. On special rare occasions Austrian avant-garde film maker, Kurt Kren, would project his films as a backdrop for the band's performance.

They released their first 45 single recording, Crowd Control/Corporate Settings in 1979. Among their many accomplishments, Really Red were the first Texas punk band to tour extensively outside of Texas. In addition they were the first Texas punk band to have a full-length album distributed nationally; Teaching You the Fear released in 1981. The title track cited the murders of three men by members of the Houston police department; a Black Panther activist Carl Hampton, a Latino man Joe Campos Torres, and a gay man Fred Paez. Rest in Pain, Really Red's second album was released in 1985 and most of side two departed from the punk genre into a dark soundscape that was a homage to the Red Crayola's "Parable of Arable Land" album. Really Red broke up in 1985 after releasing 2 albums, 2 45's, 2 7-inch EPs, and tracks on various compilations.

Their song "Prostitution" appeared on the Alternative Tentacles compilation album Let Them Eat Jellybeans!. The song "Nobody Rules" was included on the compilation Cottage Cheese from the Lips of Death. That version was intended for their Rest in Pain album but due to a mix up it ended up on "Cottage Cheese." Their cover of Petula Clark's "Downtown" was included on the 1996 7-inch 45 Rather See You Dead: Houston Punk 1978-1979 from the Hot Box Review label. Their song "I Was a Teenage Fuckup" appeared on the soundtrack to the film American Hardcore.

The 1981 LP "Teaching You The Fear" was re-issued on Empty Records in 2004. 2015 saw the reissue of all of Really Red's material, as well as unreleased rarities, by Alternative Tentacles. This release came as a two CD set Teaching You The Fear: The Complete Collection and three full length vinyl albums (see below).

For years, as well as fronting Really Red, lead singer U-Ron (as Perry Coma) created and hosted the original "Funhouse" radio show, on Pacifica's Houston station KPFT.

The only member to continue making music has been drummer Bob Weber who did a California tour with the notorious Culturcide and then joined The Anarchitex. Both bands were also from Houston Texas.

2020 saw Teaching You the Fear... Again a tribute album released with contributions from bands including Sugar Shack, Verbal Abuse, The Hickoids, Mudhoney, Gary Floyd/Dicks, Jello Biafra, The Bellrays, Darwin's Finches and MDC among many other notable groups.

== Members ==
Really Red’s members sometimes appeared under various other names:

- Ronald "U-Ron" Bond - Vocals/lyrics
- Kelly Younger - Guitar
- Robert Weber - Drums
- John Paul Williams - Bass guitar

== Discography ==
=== Singles and EPs ===
- Crowd Control/Corporate Settings 7-inch (CIA Records) - 1979
- Modern Needs/White Lies 7-inch (CIA Records) - 1980
- Despise Moral Majority: 4 song Live 7-inch EP (CIA Records) - 1980
- New Strings for Old Puppets 7-inch EP (CIA Records) - 1982

=== Full lengths ===
- Teaching You the Fear (CIA Records) - 1981 LP
- Rest in Pain (CIA Records) - 1985 LP
- Really Red 1980 - 1984 Compilation (Angry Neighbor) CD
- Teaching You the Fear (Empty Records) reissue - 2004 LP CD
- Teaching You The Fear: The Complete Collection (Alternative Tentacles) 2015 reissue 1979-1985 2XCD
- Volume 1: Teaching You The Fear (Alternative Tentacles) 2015 reissue LP
- Volume 2: Rest In Pain (Alternative Tentacles) 2015 reissue LP
- Volume 3: New Strings For Old Puppets (Alternative Tentacles) 2015 reissue LP

=== Compilation appearances ===
- Let Them Eat Jellybeans! (Alternative Tentacles) 1981 LP
- Cottage Cheese from the Lips of Death (Ward 9 Records) 1983 LP
- Killed by Death Vol 2 (Redrum Records) Bootleg LP
- Killed by Death Vol 4 (Redrum Records) Bootleg LP
- Rather See You Dead: Houston Punk 1978–1979 (Hot Box Review) 1996
- Deep in the Throat of Texas (Existential Vacuum) LP
- Faster & Louder: Hardcore Punk, Vol. 1 (Rhino Records) 1993 CD
- American Hardcore soundtrack (Rhino Records) 2006 CD
