= Egg Yolk Jubilee =

American band

Egg Yolk Jubilee is a band based in New Orleans and noted for their eclectic musical style, combining jazz, blues, funk, rock, and funeral music elements. In addition to traditional stage venues, they also perform as a street-walking brass band, and have released several studio albums.

== History ==
The band was formed in 1996 by former members of New Orleans bands Lump, Grassy Knoll and Sticka Bush. They began marching with Krewe du Vieux in 1999, at the suggestion of Davis Rogan.

Over the course of two decades, they have collaborated with Quintron, John Gros, Rob Cambre, Ernie K-Doe, Al "Carnival Time" Johnson, Alex Chilton, Jello Biafra and Howard Tate.

They have been honored with the Best of the Beat Award from Offbeat magazine as well as the Big Easy Award and have performed at New Orleans Jazz and Heritage Festival, French Quarter Festival, South by Southwest, and Ponderosa Stomp.

== Style ==
Egg Yolk is known for unexpected musical juxtapositions, veering from traditional Dixieland to avant-garde prog-rock within a single performance or even a single song, leading one music writer to label them as "hard-to-describe yet consummately New Orleans." Known for antics such as throwing fake fried eggs at the audience, their musical style has been noted for its humor and intelligence, leading to critics to compare them to Frank Zappa and George Clinton. Band members have referred to their music as "heavy brass."

== Soundtracks ==
Their 2008 song "Requiem for an Asshole" was featured, without credit, in a 2011 episode of HBO's Treme. The band scored the soundtrack for the independent 2015 film A Night at Amethyst's.

== Lineup ==
- Eric Belletto
- Geoff Douville (deceased)
- Paul Grass
- Keith Hajjar
- Mike Hogan
- Mike Joseph (deceased)
- Mac McCann
- Glenn Grass

== Discography ==
- Champions of Breakfast (1998)
- Brunch with Rocco Fancypants (2000)
- Labor of Lunch (2008)
- Fried (2012)
- Crux of the Yolk (limited run 2016)
- Defining Gravity (2021)
