= Dart National Bank =

Private bank

The Dart Bank
- Formerly: The Dart National Bank of Mason (1925–1998)
- Type: Privately held company
- Industry: Banking
- Founded: May 1, 1925; 101 years ago
- Headquarters: Mason, Michigan
- Key people: William Hufnagel, President & CEO; John Grettenberger, Chairman
- Total assets: ▲US$433 million (2018); US$397 million (2017)
- Total equity: US$36 million (2017)
- Website: www.dartbank.com

The Dart Bank is a private bank headquartered in Mason, Michigan. The bank has 4 branches, all of which are in Ingham County or Eaton County.

== History ==
The bank was founded on May 1, 1925, by Rollin Charles "RC" Dart and his son, Doc Campbell Dart, as The Dart National Bank of Mason. RC was president of the bank until his death in 1943. Doc Campbell Dart then became president and chief executive officer of the bank until his death in 1960.

In 1937, the bank acquired First State Savings Bank.

Two court cases involving Dart, in 1959 and 1962, helped to clarify and establish precedent in a segment of personal property law governed by the Uniform Trust Receipts Act (UTRA).

In 1974, the bank opened a branch in Holt, Michigan.

The founder's grandson, Rollin Dart, was chairman from 1962 to 2005, and president from 1962 to 1999. During Rollin’s tenure, the bank's assets increased from $8 million to $180 million.

In 1999, Ronald Rhoades became president and chief executive officer of the bank.

In April 2005, Dart opened a branch in Grand Ledge, Michigan.

Effective March 1, 2007, after the retirement of Ronald Rhodes, Peter Kubacki became the bank’s fifth president and chief executive officer.
