= The Crucifucks =

American punk rock band

- Also known as: The Scribbles, The L.D. Eye
- Origin: Lansing, Michigan
- Genre: Punk rock
- Years active: 1981–1989; 1996–1998
- Label: Alternative Tentacles
- Past members: Doc Corbin Dart; Joe Dart; Scott Fagersten; Steve Shelley; Gus Varner; Marc Hauser; Todd Southern; Aaron Vanderpool; Joel Kuszai; Steve Merchant; David Breher; Nathaniel Warren

The Crucifucks were an American punk band formed in 1981 in Lansing, Michigan. They were noted for their political agitation, provocative lyrics, and unusually shrill vocals by band leader Doc Corbin Dart. Dead Kennedys vocalist Jello Biafra signed them to his independent Alternative Tentacles label.

Other members of the original line up included Dart's cousin Joe on guitar, Scott Fagersten on bass, and drummer Steve Shelley, who went on to play with Sonic Youth.

== History ==
The band's debut LP The Crucifucks was recorded in 1984 and released in 1985 on Jello Biafra's Alternative Tentacles label. Wisconsin followed in 1987, also on Alternative Tentacles. Between that album and 1996's L.D. Eye, Dart recorded two solo projects, Patricia, on Alternative Tentacles in 1990, and Black Tuesday, a self-released cassette, in 1991. After a long hiatus, Doc released an album entitled "The Messiah" on Crustacean Records in 2004. The moniker he used for this album is "26".

A Crucifucks compilation album entitled Our Will Be Done was issued in 1992, combining the band's first two LPs with a non-LP song, "Annual Report", also featured on Maximum Rock 'n' Roll's compilation Welcome To 1984. A picture of a Philadelphia police officer posing as shot—originally part of a public relations campaign to obtain wage concessions from the city—was used on the album's back cover. Four years later, its discovery by the Philadelphia Fraternal Order of Police led to a lawsuit against the Crucifucks, which was eventually dismissed.

Dart claims the Crucifucks never officially broke up, but rather drifted apart due to a variety of reasons. By the mid 1990s, Dart had formed a new group called The L.D. Eye. When the group had prepared a full-length record, Alternative Tentacles agreed to release it under the stipulation that it be credited to The Crucifucks. Thus, the group changed its name to The Crucifucks, although no former members other than Dart were involved with The L.D. Eye, and used The L.D. Eye as the title of the 1996 album. The band played a number of concerts during this period, including a 1998 performance at Alternative Tentacles' twentieth anniversary party at the Great American Music Hall in San Francisco, California, before sinking back into inactivity.

In the early 2000's Dart toured with Arizona based punk band the Zero Tolerance Task Force. ZTTF would open for Dart, and he would perform Crucifucks songs with them backing him up. They did at least two tours of this. ZTTF was also signed to Alternative Tentacles.

The band was known for its anti-authoritarian lyrics, often rife with obscure and perverse humor. The band sought to go beyond the pale in terms of lyrical content, attempting to be as offensive as possible. Many of their other songs are similarly blunt, attacking the American government, American culture in general, and religion, particularly Christianity.

As recently as 2006, Dart has begun identifying himself by the name 26 (dropping his entire given name of Doc Corbin Dart) and renounces swear words, such as his former group's moniker.

== Discography ==
- The Crucifucks - 1985
- Wisconsin - 1987
- Our Will Be Done - 1992
- L.D. Eye - 1996
