= Hot Man Pussy =

Studio album by Tragic Mulatto
- Released: 1989
- Genre: Noise rock
- Length: 40:01
- Label: Alternative Tentacles
- Producer: Klaus Flouride

Tragic Mulatto chronology
Locos por el Sexo (1987)	Hot Man Pussy (1989)	Chartreuse Toulouse (1990)

Hot Man Pussy is the second album by noise rock band Tragic Mulatto, released in 1989 by Alternative Tentacles.

== Release and reception ==
Professional ratings
Review scores
Source	Rating
Allmusic	3/5 stars

Ira Robbins of the Trouser Press gave the album an enthusiastic review, although mentioning that the "incoherent blur of feedback and neck-wringing gets fairly numbing."

Hot Man Pussy was the band's only album to be issued on CD, titled Italians Fall Down and Look Up Your Dress and featuring additional tracks. The CD comprises Hot Man Pussy in its entirety, six tracks from their debut Locos por el Sexo (omitting the tracks "Underwear Maintenance" and "Swineherd in the Tenderloin") and the song "OK Baby OK", which was previously only available on the various artist compilation Oops! Wrong Stereotype.

== Track listing ==
All tracks are written by Tragic Mulatto, except "Whole Lotta Love" by Led Zeppelin.

Side one
No.	Title	Length
1.	"She's a Ho"	4:58
2.	"Fist of the Fleet"	4:25
3.	"Hardcore Bigot Scum Get Stabbed"	4:06
4.	"I Say"	5:09

Side two
No.	Title	Length
1.	"The Hat"	4:30
2.	"My Name Is Not O'Neill"	3:22
3.	"Whole Lotta Love"	6:41
4.	"Mr. Cheese"	4:23
5.	"The Sheriff of Weed"	2:23

Italians Fall Down and Look Up Your Dress CD bonus tracks
No.	Title	Length
10.	"OK Baby OK"	3:57
11.	"Freddy"	5:22
12.	"Safeway"	2:42
13.	"Potato Wine"	2:41
14.	"Sexy Money"	5:21
15.	"Monkey Boy"	3:36
16.	"Twerpenstein"	4:29

== Personnel ==
Adapted from the Hot Man Pussy liner notes.

Tragic Mulatto

- Lance Boyle (as Reverend Elvister Shanksley) – bass guitar, vocals, banjo, harmonica
- Gail Coulson (as Flatula Lee Roth) – vocals, saxophone, tuba
- Jack Killpatrick (as Jack-Buh) – guitar
- Jehu Goder – guitar
- Marc Galipeau (as Humpty Doody) – drums
- Marianne Riddle (as Bambi Nonymous) – Drums

Additional musicians and production

- Klaus Flouride – production

== Release history ==
Region	Date	Label	Format	Catalog
United States	1989	Alternative Tentacles	CD, CS, LP	VIRUS 74
