= Locos por el Sexo =

Studio album by Tragic Mulatto
- Released: 1987
- Recorded: December 23, 1986
- Studio: Hyde Street Studios, San Francisco, CA
- Genre: Noise rock
- Length: 31:57
- Label: Alternative Tentacles

Tragic Mulatto chronology
Judo for the Blind (1984)	Locos por el Sexo (1987)	Hot Man Pussy (1989)

Locos por el Sexo is the debut album of noise rock band Tragic Mulatto, released in 1987 by Alternative Tentacles.

== Release and reception ==
Professional ratings
Review scores
Source	Rating
Allmusic	3/5 stars

Ira Robbins of the Trouser Press gave considerable praise to Locos por el Sexo, saying that the "taste-is-no-obstacle lyrics are funnier than a poke in the eye with a sharp stick" and that "fans of the vulgar but hysterical could do worse than to bathe in this delectable cesspool."

Despite never being individually issued on CD, five out of eight of the album's songs can be found on the Italians Fall Down and Look Up Your Dress compilation album.

== Track listing ==
All tracks are written by Tragic Mulatto.

Side one
No.	Title	Length
1.	"Freddy"	5:29
2.	"[untitled] (sometimes known as 'Safeway')"	2:46
3.	"Underwear Maintenance"	3:45
4.	"Sexy Money"	5:21

Side two
No.	Title	Length
1.	"Monkey Boy"	3:30
2.	"Potato Wine"	2:43
3.	"Swineherd in the Tenderloin"	3:50
4.	"Twerpenstein"	4:33

== Personnel ==
Adapted from the Locos por el Sexo liner notes.

Tragic Mulatto

- Gail Coulson (as Flatula Lee Roth) – vocals, saxophone, tuba
- Lance Boyle (as Reverend Elvister Shanksley) – bass guitar, vocals, harmonica, mixing, cover art
- Tim Carroll (as Richard Skidmark) – guitar
- Jay Smith (as Jazzbo Smith) – drums

Additional musicians and production

- Garry Creiman – engineering
- John Cuniberti – mixing

== Release history ==
Region	Date	Label	Format	Catalog
United States	1987	Alternative Tentacles	LP	VIRUS 69
