= Th' Inbred =

Th' Inbred was a hardcore punk band from Morgantown, West Virginia. It released two albums, A Family Affair and Kissing Cousins, and an EP, Reproduction.

== Origins ==
The original idea was to form punk band that incorporated a banjo into the band. Subject matter of the songs included many songs looking critically at the punk scenes they were (or had been) a part of or linked to. There was an influence from Situationism and anarchism.

Th’ Inbred emerged in the alternative music club The Underground Railroad and its all-ages annex The Dry House.

== Career ==
Th’ Inbred toured across the USA with Raw Power (Italy) and The Rhythm Pigs (El Paso). It also shared the stage with Corrosion of Conformity, The Dead Kennedys, The Circle Jerks, D.R.I., Butthole Surfers. The band lasted from 1984 to 1988.

The band's sound was described by Alternative Tentacles' Jello Biafra as "Bach meets Black Flag" and by Raw Power's drummer as "the Rush of Hardcore".

Singer “Art Reco” designed politically-charged and/or horror-influenced punk fliers for shows. One such flier, from 1986 is on the cover of ‘Visual Vitriol, The Street Art and Subcultures of The Punk and Hardcore Generation’ by David A. Ensminger (2011, University Press of Mississippi, Jackson).

The band's first recording, Reproduction, was released on the label Frozen Sound with a run of just 500 copies. The second album was produced by Paul Mahern of Zero Boys. Kissing Cousins was released in Europe on Konkurrel. The Inbred material (with a few unreleased cuts) was reissued by Alternative Tentacles in 2009.

Their political message was conveyed in outrageous stage antics; a fan went to Inbred shows to be entertained as well as educated, never knowing what would happen next. That sense of theater was illustrated by such diverse examples as the "Destroy All Monsters Gig" (with Adrenalin O.D., when they showed the Castle condensed version of the above-named film accompanied by "The Rites of Spring", by Stravinsky, which segued into their opening song) to the lead singer's spot-on parodies of well-known hardcore figures, such as Henry Rollins (of Black Flag).

In May, 2013 three members of the band reunited (with an additional member) to be part of a two-day reunion of about fifteen 1980s bands from the Underground Railroad scene, at that same venue, now called 123 Pleasant Street.

Bobb Cotter died on February 8, 2020, in Pittsburgh, Pennsylvania. (June 22, 1959, to Feb. 8, 2020.)

== Members ==
- Bob Cotter (Art Reco)—vocals, lyrics;
- Bill Atwell III—drums;
- Robert Bowers—guitar;
- John ‘Duff’ McIntosh—bass guitar
