= Welcome to Violence =

Compilation album by Buzzov*en
- Released: April 26, 2005
- Recorded: 1992 – November 8, 1993
- Genre: Sludge metal
- Length: 78:09
- Label: Alternative Tentacles

Buzzov*en chronology
...At a Loss (1998)	Welcome to Violence (2005)	Revelation: Sick Again (2011)

Professional ratings
Review scores
Source	Rating
AllMusic	3/5 stars

Welcome to Violence is a compilation album by American sludge metal band Buzzov*en, released on April 26, 2005. The album consists of their debut album To a Frown, as well as the EPs Wound and Unwilling to Explain which are all out of print.

== Track listing ==
No.	Title	Length
1.	"Intro/Scratch"	0:07
2.	"To a Frown"	3:54
3.	"Shove"	1:45
4.	"Drained"	5:22
5.	"Forget It"	2:35
6.	"Frayed"	3:31
7.	"Splinter My Eye"	2:03
8.	"Wound"	4:06
9.	"Toe Fry"	2:39
10.	"Aching Improv #9"	3:47
11.	"Weeding"	9:18
12.	"Behaved"	2:26
13.	"Done"	3:04
14.	"Hollow"	4:41
15.	"Aching Improv #13"	6:18
16.	"Should I"	6:27
17.	"I Don't Like You"	5:33
18.	"I Never"	1:49
19.	"Proven Wrong"	3:29
20.	"Blinded"	3:54
21.	"Scrunge"	1:21
Total length:		78:09

== Personnel ==
- Kirk – vocals, guitar
- Igor – bass
- Ash – drums
- LeDarrell – bass
- Little Buddy – guitar
- Ash – drums
- LeDarrell – bass
- Scott – drums
- Arik Moonhawk Roper – cover art
