= Knights of the New Crusade =

American Christian punk band

- Origin: San Francisco, California
- Genres: Christian rock, Christian punk, garage rock, punk rock
- Years active: Since 1999
- Label: Alternative Tentacles

Knights of the New Crusade is an American Christian punk and Christian rock band, and they primarily play garage rock and punk rock. They came from San Francisco, California. The band started making music in 1999, and releasing three albums, two of them with Alternative Tentacles.

== Background ==
The band make garage rock and punk rock music, with an emphasis on Christian punk and Christian rock themed lyricism. They started in November 1999 in San Francisco as a band, where they were eventually signed to the Alternative Tentacles label in 2005.

== Music history ==
The band released three studio albums. The first, My God Is Alive! Sorry About Yours! Songs In Praise Of Our Lord God And In Condemnation Of Sin was released on CD in the U.S. by Gabriel's Trumpet and on vinyl in Germany by Screaming Apple in 2004. Their second release, A Challenge to the Cowards of Christendom, that was released on March 28, 2006, with Alternative Tentacles Records. Their subsequent and final release with the label, Knight Vision: Hymns For The Invisible Church, came out in 2010.

== Members ==
Members

- Leaky – vocals
- John – guitar
- Scoop – bass
- Lump – drums

== Discography ==
Studio albums

- My God Is Alive! Sorry About Yours! Songs In Praise Of Our Lord God And In Condemnation Of Sin (2004, Gabriel's Trumpet)
- A Challenge to the Cowards of Christendom (2006, Alternative Tentacles)
- Knight Vision: Hymns For The Invisible Church (2010, Alternative Tentacles)
