= M.I.A. (American band) =

American 1980s punk rock band

- Origin: Las Vegas, Nevada
- Genres: Punk rock Hardcore punk
- Years active: 1982–present
- Labels: Alternative Tentacles; Flipside Records
- Members: Nick Adams; Chris Moon; Paul Schwartz; Larry Pearson
- Past members: Todd Sampson; Mike Conley; Frank Daly; Mark Arnold; James Whitesell (Cyborg)

M.I.A. is an American 1980s punk rock band from Las Vegas, Nevada. The band's sound is generally hardcore and thrash, though they produced more melodic and progressive sounds in their later albums. AllMusic called the band "one of the 50 best So-Cal punk bands of the great early-'80s second wave explosion."

== History ==
The band had its origins in the Las Vegas Valley, where in 1980 singer Todd Sampson, bassist Mike Conley, and drummer Chris Moon were in a band called The Swell. Guitarist Nick Adams joined and the band changed their name to M.I.A. and played one show on December 31, 1980, New Year's Eve. Adams left the band two weeks later and moved to San Diego, Calif.; later that spring Moon and Conley moved to Orange County. In June 1981 Adams moved to Orange County and the three decided to re-form the band with Conley moving to vocals and bringing in another Las Vegas friend, Paul Schwartz, to play bass.

During the remainder of 1981 the band played parties and shows, including several at the Cuckoo's Nest in Costa Mesa and the Cathay de Grande in Hollywood. They recorded a nine-song demo on 8 tracks at JEL Studios in Newport Beach consisting of songs from their Las Vegas period plus several new songs written in Orange County. They met artist Greg Link, who agreed to be their manager. Link booked a mini-tour through Nevada and Northern California that took them to Reno, where they played a show with The Wrecks and 7 Seconds. They left a demo tape with Kevin Seconds, who later passed a copy to Tim Yohannan from the Berkeley-based fanzine Maximum Rock n Roll. Yohannan decided to include the song "New Left" on the Maximum Rock and Roll compilation Not So Quiet on the Western Front on the Alternative Tentacles label. Yohannan passed the tape to Greg Shaw at Bomp! Records, who included the song "Tell Me Why" on the punk compilation American Youth Report. Shaw passed the tape to Felix Alanis at Smoke Seven records who decided to release the entire demo (excepting "New Left," which Maximum Rock n Roll wanted exclusively) on the split LP Last Rites for Genocide and M.I.A. in 1982.

As their music was released, the band had to be put on hiatus as Conley had to return to Las Vegas for personal reasons. When Conley returned in 1983 the band picked up where they left off, playing shows and setting out to record another demo. At this time drummer Larry Pearson was recruited by Conley to replace Moon. In 1984 they made a deal with the cult Alternative Tentacles label, after the label's founder, Dead Kennedys frontman Jello Biafra, saw them play at a secret illegal punk nightclub in Las Vegas. Biafra was impressed by Mike Conley's distinctive voice, saying "The minute you hear a song with him singing you know it's him." The band paid for the recording (this time on 16 tracks at JEL Studios), mastering and pressing of Murder in a Foreign Place and Alternative Tentacles would distribute the album on their label. Murder in a Foreign Place was released in June 1984 and supported by a three-month summer tour of the United States and Canada.

In early 1985 the band recorded three songs at Evan Williams Studios produced by Chris Maneckie of the band Abecedarians. Conley was unhappy with the sound, so this demo was not released at this time, but did appear later on the Lost Boys retrospective. When Social Distortion had to cancel a tour of the East Coast, the dates were offered to M.I.A. and they undertook the tour in March 1985. On return the band recorded new material with producer Thom Wilson, which was released summer 1985 as Notes From the Underground on National Trust Records. The tour and recording had taken a toll on the band and it broke up with Adams and Schwartz leaving. In 1986 Conley brought back Moon on drums and added bassist Frank Daly and guitarist Mark Arnold. The band released After the Fact on Flipside Records in 1987. The band split up in 1988.

In 2001, Alternative Tentacles released Lost Boys, a 37-song retrospective of the band's work, including Last Rites, Murder in a Foreign Place, and several additional tracks.

=== Death of Mike Conley ===
On February 28, 2008, vocalist Mike Conley was found dead in a Chicago hotel parking lot. Conley was taken to Gottlieb Memorial Hospital in Melrose Park, where he was pronounced dead.

On April 27, 2008, there was a secret warm-up show at The Detroit Bar, in Costa Mesa California, featuring original vocalist Todd Sampson (ex-Self Abuse and Samson's Army) on vocals, Jello Biafra of Dead Kennedys on guest vocals, Chris Moon and Larry Pearson on drums, Nick Adams on guitar, and Bob Thomson on bass. On April 28, 2008, the "Beautiful Noise" benefit show took place at the Anaheim House of Blues with Jigsaw, Naked Soul, Cadillac Tramps, Social Distortion and M.I.A. with the same lineup as the previous night, but adding Kevin Seconds of 7 Seconds on guest vocals. The proceeds of "Beautiful Noise" went to Conley's family.

Todd Sampson died in Las Vegas, following a concert on July 25, 2010.

=== Reunion-present ===
The original remaining members of M.I.A. reformed for the 2nd Annual Las Vegas Hardcore reunion (L.V.HC.), on November 8, 2014, at the Backstage Bar & Billiards, Downtown Las Vegas, Nevada. Nick Adams assumed vocals as well as guitar duties, with Paul Schwartz on bass and backing vocals and Chris Moon on drums and backing vocals.

== Discography ==
- Last Rites for Genocide / MIA (split LP, 1982, BOMP/Invasion Records)
- Murder in a Foreign Place (LP, 1984, Alternative Tentacles)
- Notes From the Underground (LP, 1985, National Trust Records)
- After the Fact (LP, 1987, Flipside Records)
- Lost Boys (CD, 2001, Alternative Tentacles)

=== Compilation appearances ===
- Maximum Rock N Roll's Not So Quiet on the Western Front (1982)
  - Includes "New Left"
- American Youth Report (1982)
  - Includes "Tell Me Why"
- "Half Skull" 7-inch EP (1984)
  - Includes "Turning Into What You Hate"
- Flipside Vinyl Fanzine Vol. 2 (1985)
  - Includes "Just A Dream"
- Buried Alive: Smoke 7 Records 81-83 (1995)
  - Includes "Tell Me Why"
- O.C.'s 5400 Day Revolution (1999)
  - Includes "Boredom is the Reason"
- Buried Alive: The Best from Smoke 7 Records, Vol. 2 (2000)
  - Includes "Fucking Zones – I Can't Take It No More" and "I Hate Hippies"
