= Wisconsin (album) =

Studio album by The Crucifucks
- Released: January 1, 1987
- Recorded: Smart Studios, Madison, Wisconsin
- Genre: Punk rock
- Label: Alternative Tentacles

The Crucifucks chronology
The Crucifucks (1985)	Wisconsin (1987)	Our Will Be Done (1995)

Professional ratings
Review scores
Source	Rating
Allmusic	4/5 stars

Wisconsin is the second album by the hardcore punk band The Crucifucks. The album is noted for having a more "mellow" sound compared to The Crucifucks debut, although its lyrics maintain a stridently anarchist political viewpoint.

== Track listing ==
1. "Intro"
2. "The Mountain Song"
3. "Washington"
4. "Resurrection"
5. "Earth by Invitation Only"
6. "Laws Against Laughing"
7. "Pig in a Blanket"
8. "When the Top Comes Off"
9. "Concession Stand"
10. "Wisconsin"
11. "Artificial Competition"
12. "Holiday Parade"
13. "The Savior"
