= Our Will Be Done =

Compilation album by The Crucifucks
- Released: 1992
- Genre: Hardcore punk
- Length: 1:09:53
- Label: Alternative Tentacles

The Crucifucks chronology
Wisconsin (1987)	Our Will Be Done (1992)	L.D. Eyes 1996 (1987)

Professional ratings
Review scores
Source	Rating
Allmusic	4/5 stars

Our Will Be Done is an album by The Crucifucks, released in 1992 on Jello Biafra's Alternative Tentacles record label. The album is a compilation combining all songs from their two previous albums, The Crucifucks and Wisconsin, plus the non-LP song "Annual Report," which had featured on a Maximum Rock 'n' Roll compilation Welcome To 1984. The album received criticism for its controversial image on the back cover of what appeared to be a dead Philadelphia police man.

== Track listing ==
1. "Democracy Spawns Bad Taste" – 1:52
2. "Go Bankrupt and Die" – 1:23
3. "You Give Me the Creeps" – 1:03
4. "Marching for Trash" – 1:45
5. "Legal Genocide" – 2:29
6. "I Am the Establishment" – 1:54
7. "Cops for Fertilizer" – 1:48
8. "Hinkley Had a Vision" – 2:12
9. "By the Door" – 2:43
10. "Oh Where, Oh Where?" – 1:10
11. "I Was" – 1:25
12. "Similar Items" – 2:32
13. "Official Terrorism" – 1:27
14. "No One Can Make Me Play Along with This" – 3:25
15. "Down on My Knees" – 3:08
16. "Annual Report - 1:22
17. "Intro"- 1:44
18. "The Mountain Song" - 1:24
19. "Washington" - 2:09
20. "Resurrection" - 2:04
21. "Earth by Invitation Only" - 1:06
22. "Laws Against Laughing" - 1:56
23. "Pig in a Blanket" - 4:30
24. "When the Top Comes Off" - 5:01
25. "Concession Stand" - 4:21
26. "Wisconsin" - 2:26
27. "Artificial Competition" - 3:19
28. "Holiday Parade" - 1:39
29. "The Savior" - 6:32
