= L'Autrichienne (Jucifer album) =

L' Autrichienne

Studio album by Jucifer
- Released: March 18, 2008
- Recorded: July 2007 at Bakery Studios
- Genre: Noise rock, sludge metal
- Length: 70:25
- Label: Relapse

Jucifer chronology
If Thine Enemy Hunger (2006)	L' Autrichienne (2008)	Throned in Blood (2010)

L'Autrichienne is the fourth album by the American metal band Jucifer. It was first released on March 18, 2008.

== History ==
L' Autrichienne, which is Jucifer's fourth album, was recorded in July 2007 at Bakery Studios by Andy Baker. It was released in 2008, two years after the release of the band's previous album, If Thine Enemy Hunger, by Relapse Records; on March 18 in the United States and on March 24 internationally.

To support the album, Jucifer embarked on their first tour through Europe. After the European tour they toured over the Northeastern United States and Canada.

== Music ==
According to Greg Prato from Allmusic, there are so many different styles found in L'Autrichienne that it would be possible to fool the average listener into thinking each track was made by a different band; it shows influences ranging from indie rock to sludge metal. In the album there are songs with a style close to Black Sabbath's, such as "Blackpowder", hardcore punk tracks like "Thermidor", Melvins-esque metal slow pieces such as "Deficit", and doom metal songs such as "The Mountain" and "Procession a la Guillotine"; even quiet balladry can be found in the album. Amber Valentine uses many vocal techniques in the record.

It's a concept album about the French Revolution. Although the album includes songs about many events of the period, and its lyrics reflect voices of major figures ranging from the peasantry to the deposed King and Queen and their court, the title refers to Marie Antoinette, who was nicknamed "l'Autrichienne" (French: the Austrian) due to her Austrian origin. The name seems on its surface merely descriptive, but in context of the Revolution was used derisively, as it is a homonym of "l'autre chienne" ["the other bitch"]. The band chose this title for its historical relevance and double entendre meaning. Guitarist/vocalist Valentine had been intrigued with this period of history, and Marie Antoinette's poor treatment by peers and historians, since receiving a historical paper doll book including Antoinette at the age of six. During the intervening 30 years, Valentine read voraciously about the time period and was inspired to write most of the double album's worth of songs (the remainder written by drummer and co-founding member Edgar Livengood). The album's liner notes feature a historical commentary to each song, written by Valentine and based on her lifelong research about the French Revolution.

=== Critical reception ===
Professional ratings
Review scores
Source	Rating
AllMusic	4.5/5 stars
Pitchfork Media	8.0/10

L' Autrichienne was given a 4.5 out of 5 in AllMusic and an 8.0 of 10 in Pitchfork Media. Both praised the musical variety which can be appreciated in the album.

Gazelle Amber Valentine's work as a singer in this album has been compared to young PJ Harvey's as well as Courtney Love's. Her ability to shift from one vocal technique to another has been praised specially by Greg Prato from Allmusic, who asserts only very talented vocalists are able to do what she does.

== Track listing ==
Music by Jucifer. Lyrics written by Amber Valentine.

No.	Title	Length
1.	"Blackpowder"	2:16
2.	"Thermidor"	0:32
3.	"To Earth"	3:04
4.	"Deficit"	2:29
5.	"Champ de Mars"	3:52
6.	"Fall of the Bastille"	0:56
7.	"To the End"	3:18
8.	"Armada"	5:56
9.	"L 'Autrichienne"	5:00
10.	"Behind Every Great Man"	3:10
11.	"October"	4:09
12.	"Birds of a Feather"	2:11
13.	"Traitors"	2:28
14.	"The Law of Suspects"	2:31
15.	"Noyade"	4:21
16.	"The Mountain"	9:07
17.	"Window (Where the Sea Falls Forever)"	4:59
18.	"Fleur de Lis"	2:39
19.	"Procession a la Guillotine"	3:50
20.	"Coma"	1:40
21.	"The Assembly"	1:57

== Personnel ==
- Gazelle Amber Valentine – Guitars, Vocals, Banjo, Cello, Violin, Mellotron
- Edgar Livengood – Drums, Timpani, Trumpet, Trombone, Piano
- Andy Baker – Engineering
- Scott Hull – Mastering
- Orion Landau – Artwork

== Release history ==
Region	Date	Label	Format	Catalog
United States	March 18, 2008	Relapse Records	CD	67312
United States	March 18, 2008	Relapse Records	CD	766731
United States	March 18, 2008	Alternative Tentacles	LP	386
Worldwide	March 24, 2008			
