= The Crucifucks (album) =

Studio album by The Crucifucks
- Released: 1985
- Recorded: 1984
- Genre: Hardcore punk
- Length: 30:30
- Label: Alternative Tentacles
- Producer: Spot

The Crucifucks chronology
The Crucifucks (1985)	Wisconsin (1987)

Professional ratings
Review scores
Source	Rating
Allmusic	3/5 stars
Sputnikmusic	4.5/5 stars

The Crucifucks is the debut album from the band of the same name, released in 1985 on Jello Biafra's Alternative Tentacles record label. Although it never achieved commercial success, it has procured a cult following, most likely due to Doc Corbin Dart's uniquely shrill vocals and violent political lyrics. The album was later issued on the group's compilation album Our Will Be Done with "Wisconsin" and a bonus track from the band's original lineup. In a 2007 interview, Doc Dart disowned the album, calling it "an abomination".

== Track listing ==
1. "Democracy Spawns Bad Taste" – 1:52
2. "Go Bankrupt and Die" – 1:23
3. "You Give Me the Creeps" – 1:03
4. "Marching for Trash" – 1:45
5. "Legal Genocide" – 2:29
6. "I Am the Establishment" – 1:54
7. "Cops for Fertilizer" – 1:48
8. "Hinkley Had a Vision" – 2:12
9. "By the Door" – 2:43
10. "Oh Where, Oh Where?" – 1:10
11. "I Was" – 1:25
12. "Similar Items" – 2:32
13. "Official Terrorism" – 1:27
14. "No One Can Make Me Play Along with This" – 3:25
15. "Down on My Knees" – 3:08
