= Buzzoven =

American sludge metal band

Background information
- Also known as: Buzzoven, Buzzov-en, Buzzov.en, Buzzov*en, Buzzov•en
- Origin: Salisbury, North Carolina, U.S.
- Genres: Sludge metal
- Years active: 1990–1999, 2010–present
- Labels: Relapse, Hydra Head, Roadrunner, Allied, Alternative Tentacles,
- Members: Kirk Fisher; Ramzi Ateyeh; Dave Collins; Mike Floyd
- Past members: Fred Hutch; Scott Majors; Brian Hill; Dennis Woolard; Buddy Apostolis; Ashley Williamson; Johnny Brito; Craig Baker

Buzzoven (typeset Buzzov•en) is an American sludge metal band from Salisbury, North Carolina, formed in 1990. The band was known for being one of the founders of the sludge genre along with Louisiana's Eyehategod and Acid Bath, and also for their out-of-control and violent live shows. The band in its early days toured heavily around the United States and built up a cult following leading up to the release of their debut album, To a Frown (1993), which caught the attention of Roadrunner Records, who released the band's second album Sore (1994). The band was later dropped by Roadrunner. From then on, the band has gone through several periods of being split-up and reformed. The only constant member during this time has been Kirk Fisher. In 2018, the band toured the Southern US as one of the opening acts for Eyehategod.

== Band members ==
Current

- Kirk Fisher aka Reverend Dirtkicker – vocals, guitar (1990-1999, 2010-present)
- Ramzi "Ramsey Simple" Ateyeh – drums (1996–1999; 2010-present)
- Dave Collins – bass (1997–1999; 2010-present)
- Mike "Sleepy" Floyd - guitar (2010-present)

Former

- Fred "Fuzzy" Hutch – bass (1990–1991; died 2023)
- Scott Majors – drums (1990–1992)
- Brian Hill aka Igor / LeDarrell – bass (1991–1995)
- Dennis Woolard – guitar (1992)
- Buddy Apostolis – guitar (1992-1994; died 2002)
- Ashley Williamson aka Ash / Ash Lee – drums (1992–1995)
- Johnny Brito – guitar (1994–1996)
- Craig "Baked" Baker – guitar (1996–1998)

Live musicians

- Mykull Davidson – samples (1992–1996)
- Troy Medlin aka T.roy Sourvein – samples, vocals (1996–1999)
- David "Mohawk" Miranda – guitar
- Mateo Pinkerton - drums

== Discography ==
Studio albums

Title	Album details	Notes
To a Frown	Release: March 9, 1993; Label: Allied Recordings; Formats: vinyl, CD	—
Sore	Release: 1994; Label: Roadrunner Records; Formats: vinyl, CD, cassette, digital	—
...At a Loss	Release: May 5, 1998; Label: Off the Records; Formats: vinyl, CD, digital	—
Revelation: Sick Again	Release: March 29, 2011; Label: Hydra Head Records; Formats: vinyl, CD, digital	Recorded in 1998

EPs

- Buttrash Demo (1991)
- Hate Box (1992)
- Wound (1992)
- Paintime Grit Demo (1994)
- Unwilling To Explain (1994)
- The Gospel According... II (1997)
- Violence From The Vault (2010)
- Prophetic Ramblings (2022)

Compilations

- Welcome to Violence (2005)
- Violence from the Vault (2010)

Splits

- Stereonucleosis Comes to Your House Split 7" (with Antischism, Tolerance, and Unherd) (1991)
- Split 7" (with God and Texas) (1995)
- Another Day in the Lost Lives of... Split 7" (with Sourvein) (1996)
- Hot Rock Action Vol.3! Split 7" (with Haberdasher, The Spitters, and Behind Closed Doors) (1997)

Singles

- Wife Beater (from split with God and Texas) (1994)
- Nod (from split with Sourvein) (1996)
- Useless/Never Again (1997)
