= Chartreuse Toulouse =

Studio album by Tragic Mulatto
- Released: 1990
- Recorded: Profile Studios in Vancouver, Canada
- Genre: Noise rock
- Length: 31:02
- Label: Alternative Tentacles

Tragic Mulatto chronology
Hot Man Pussy (1989)	Chartreuse Toulouse (1990)

Chartreuse Toulouse is the third and final album of noise rock band Tragic Mulatto, released in 1990 through Alternative Tentacles.

== Release and reception ==
Professional ratings
Review scores
Source	Rating
Allmusic	4.5/5 stars

Jason Ankeny of allmusic admired the band for successfully fusing a number of genres, such as psychedelic and noise rock. He awarded Chartreuse Toulouse four and a half out of five stars, while mentioning Flatula's lyrics as being a detractor. Ira Robbins of the Trouser Press noted that while it does lose momentum, the album is a "psychedelic trip" and "one of Tragic Mulatto's great adventures."

== Track listing ==
All tracks are written by Tragic Mulatto, except "I Don't Mind" by Noddy Holder and Jim Lea.

Side one
No.	Title	Length
1.	"I Don't Mind" (Slade cover)	2:52
2.	"Stinking Corpse Lily"	3:01
3.	"Debbie"	4:17
4.	"My Mother"	2:04
5.	"Rhythm of Barcelona"	2:39

Side two
No.	Title	Length
1.	"Bathroom at Amelia's"	4:02
2.	"Scabs on Lori's Arm"	4:22
3.	"Farm"	1:58
4.	"Man With a Tan"	3:08
5.	"Rise Up/Get Down"	2:39

== Personnel ==
Adapted from the Chartreuse Toulouse liner notes.

Tragic Mulatto

- Lance Boyle (as Reverend Elvister Shanksley) – bass guitar, vocals, banjo, harmonica, illustration
- Gail Coulson (as Flatula Lee Roth) – vocals, saxophone, tuba, illustration
- Jehu – guitar
- Marc (as Fifi) – drums
- Marianne Riddle (as Bambi Nonymous) – drums, bass guitar, vocals

Additional musicians and production

- Carrie Bleiweiss – photography
- Jonathan Burnside – engineering
- Cecil English – engineering

== Release history ==
Region	Date	Label	Format	Catalog
United States	1990	Alternative Tentacles	CS, LP	VIRUS 80
