= The Woodbox Gang =

American band

The Woodbox Gang is a band formerly based in Herod, Illinois, then out of Makanda, Illinois. They play an eclectic style of bluegrass music labeled by some as "insurgent Americana," "jug-punk," "y'allternative," and "funk-a-billy," though they prefer the terms "caustic acoustic" and "trashcan Americana" (also the name of one of their albums).

The band originated as the trio of dobro player Brad Bolin and the brothers Hugh (guitar, kazoo, and vocals) and Brian (bass) DeNeal in 1999. Bolin soon left the band, but rejoined in 2000 along with Alex Kirt (assorted jug percussion, washboard, banjo, kazoo, harmonica, didgeridoo, slide resonator guitar, drum, vocals, stompboard, and gutbucket); however, Bolin left the band a second time. They were later joined by Greg Edwards (bass), Ratliff Dean Thiebaud (guitar and vocals), and Dan Goett (banjo, mandolin, dobro, guitar).

== Discography ==
- A Caustic Acoustic Cacophony (2001)
- Trashcan Americana (2001)
- Wormwood (2002)
- Showdown (2002)
- Born With A Tail (2003)
- I've Killed Men (2003)
- Live at Schubas 06/09/2004 (2004)
- Live at Hangar 9 (2005)
- Drunk as Dragons (2006)
- Drunk as Dragons: Fortified Edition (2008)
- White Trash Voodoo (2009)
- Glorious Scars (2012)
- Brown Cane Toad (2025)
