= These People (Dicks album) =

These People LP

Studio album by Dicks
- Released: 1985
- Genre: Punk rock
- Length: 35:10
- Label: Alternative Tentacles
- Producer: Klaus Flouride

Dicks chronology
Peace ? 7" (1984)	These People LP (1985)	Live At Raul's 2x7" (1992)

Professional ratings
Review scores
Source	Rating
AllMusic	3/5 stars

These People is the second and last studio album by the American punk band Dicks, released in 1985 on Alternative Tentacles. By the time the record was recorded, Dicks had changed half of their lineup, and relocated from Texas to San Francisco.

== Track listing ==
1. The Police (Force) – 2:27
2. Off-Duty Sailor – 2:24
3. Executive Dive – 2:56
4. Sidewalk Begging – 3:50
5. Lost and Divided – 2:06
6. Dead in a Motel Room – 3:06
7. Cities are Burning – 3:08
8. Doctor Daddy – 2:11
9. Decent and Clean – 3:29
10. Legacy of Man – 3:21
11. Little Rock n' Roller – 2:43
12. George Jackson – 3:29

== Personnel ==
- Gary Floyd – Lead vocals
- Lynn Perko – Drums
- Sebastian Fuchs – Bass
- Tim Carroll – Guitar
- Debbie Gordon – Mood coordinator
