= Tour EP =

Tour EP may refer to:

- Tour EP (Band of Horses EP), 2005
- Tour EP (Iron & Wine EP), 2002
- Tour EP (Limbeck EP), 2006
- Tour EP 1, by Nomeansno, 2010
- Tour EP 2, by Nomeansno, 2010
- Tour EP '04, by Pedro the Lion
- Tour EP (Strapping Young Lad EP), 2003
- Tour EP (Sucioperro EP), 2005
- Tour EP (Unwed Sailor EP), 2011
- Tour, by Lamin, 2020
