= Silhouettes (Marmaduke Duke song) =

Single by Marmaduke Duke

from the album Duke Pandemonium
- Released: 6 July 2009
- Recorded: 2009
- Genre: Experimental rock
- Length: 2:21
- Label: 14th Floor Records
- Lyricists: Simon Neil, JP Reid

Marmaduke Duke singles chronology
"Rubber Lover" (2009)	"Silhouettes" (2009)

"Silhouettes" is a song written by the Scottish experimental rock group Marmaduke Duke, released as the third and final single from their second album, Duke Pandemonium (2009). It was released as a single on 6 July 2009, and debuted at number 31 on the UK Physical Singles Chart.

== Release ==
The single release of "Silhouettes" was a remix version by Jacknife Lee. This version was first played by Zane Lowe on BBC Radio One in May 2009 with a preview being added to the bands Myspace page soon after. A music video has been released which was set to continue the story of the Duke as shown in videos for previous singles 'Kid Gloves' and 'Rubber Lover'.

Commercially, "Silhouettes" failed to replicate the success experienced by the bands previous two singles – "Kid Gloves" and "Rubber Lover", but did debut at number 31 on the UK Physical Singles Chart, remaining on the chart for two weeks.

== Track listing ==
- Digital download and streaming
1. "Silhouettes" – 2:21
2. "Silhouettes (Jacknife Lee Remix)" – 3:06
3. "Silhouettes (Jacknife Lee Extended Remix)" – 4:41

== Charts ==
Chart performance for "Silhouettes"
Chart (2009)	Peak position
UK Physical Singles (OCC)	31
