= Duke Pandemonium =

Studio album by Marmaduke Duke
- Released: 11 May 2009
- Genres: Alternative rock, dance-pop, funk
- Length: 32:59
- Label: 14th Floor
- Producers: J.P. Reid, Simon Neil

Marmaduke Duke chronology
The Magnificent Duke (2005)	Duke Pandemonium (2009)

Singles from Duke Pandemonium
- 1. "Kid Gloves" Released: 2 March 2009; 2. "Rubber Lover" Released: 27 April 2009; 3. "Silhouettes" Released: 6 July 2009

Duke Pandemonium is the second studio album by Scottish conceptual rock duo Marmaduke Duke, released on 11 May 2009 on 14th Floor Records. Band member JP Reid describes the album as "superfunky, supertight, superunique." According to Simon Neil, the album is "a lot more cohesive" than its predecessor The Magnificent Duke. He states that the band recorded a "dance record": "I suppose it's in that kind of TV On The Radio vibe, you know, lots of grooves and beats – I'm playing keyboard live on here, I don’t really play any guitars in this band which really helps to keep me out of that usual comfort zone."

The album performed strongly in their native Scotland, debuting at number four on the Scottish Albums Charts, whilst it entered the UK Albums Chart at number fourteen. The albums lead single, "Kid Gloves", debuted at number four on the Scottish Singles Charts, whilst its second single, "Rubber Lover", gave the band their first appearance on the national singles charts in the United Kingdom, reaching number twelve. A third and final single was released from the album, "Silhouettes", debuted at number 31 on the UK Physical Singles Charts.

== Background ==
Duke Pandemonium, the second instalment of Marmaduke Duke's planned trilogy of albums, was recorded soon after The Magnificent Duke. Many of the songs were performed at gigs as early as 2005, and the tracks "Everybody Dance" and "Music Show" were featured on a promo CD distributed in 2006. JP Reid states that the recording began "the day after I finished making Sucioperro's debut album, Random Acts of Intimacy. I spent two weeks in Wales then went straight into the studio and started on Duke Pandemonium."

Initially, the album was to be released during the summer of 2006, on the now defunct label, Captains Of Industry. The album was eventually released on 14th Floor Records in 2009. Simon Neil states:

unfortunately Captains Of Industry had gone under when we had made this record, and the guys at 14th Floor heard it and really loved it, and so we kind of gave them a finished piece. It's a weird one for them, in many ways – it's not normally the kind of thing they'd release, I think, but they really loved it from the off.

== Release ==
Professional ratings
Review scores
Source	Rating
NME	7/10 stars
Kerrang!	4/5 stars
Q	4/5 stars
RockSound	9/10 stars

The delay in the album's release was also partly due to the emergent success of Biffy Clyro, bringing with it the associated increase in touring, promotion and gigs. The album was mixed by renowned producer/mixer Rich Costey (renamed The Octopus) and was mastered by Howie Weinberg. In February 2009, "Music Show" was released as a free download from the NME website. NME also included the band's cover of "Friday I'm In Love" on a free compilation album in tribute to The Cure. They also performed an acoustic cover version of "Fall At Your Feet" by Crowded House for Dermot O'Leary's Radio show in February 2009.

"Erotic Robotic" was given its first play on BBC Radio 1 when Biffy Clyro stood in for Zane Lowe in early 2009. Subsequently, "Rubber Lover" was named as the "Hottest Record in the World Today" on Zane Lowe's Radio 1 show on 4 March 2009. In early April 2009, the album was leaked in its entirety to several filesharing websites. Whilst the CD of the album is mixed, with little to no gaps between songs, and some fading in and out over each other, the iTunes edition presents the tracks completely separated from each other, giving a slightly longer running time.

=== Promotion ===
Three singles were released to promote the album – "Kid Gloves", "Rubber Lover" and "Silhouettes". "Rubber Lover" was named the "Hottest Record" by Zane Lowe on the BBC, and the band performed a version of the song on Radio 1's Live Lounge – Volume 4 in 2009. It was described by the BBC as potentially becoming the "openly rude summer anthem" of 2009. Commercially, "Rubber Lover" reached number 12 on the UK Singles Charts, remaining within the Top 100 for ten weeks. Lead single, "Kid Gloves", reached number 4 on the Scottish Singles Charts and number 12 on the UK Physical Singles Sales charts. "Silhouettes" failed to replicate the success of the previous two singles, however, debuted at number 31 on the UK Physical Singles Sales charts.

On 8 February 2009, Marmaduke Duke announced a UK tour, with Biffy Clyro band members, Ben and James Johnston joining the band for live performances. The tour began on 28 February in Edinburgh, and concluded on 6 March 2009 in Glasgow. In April 2009, the band performed in the BBC Radio 1 Live Lounge, performing "Rubber Lover" and a cover version of "Single Ladies (Put A Ring On It)" by Beyoncé. To further promote the release of the album, they headlined the Festival Republic stage at the 2009 Reading Festival.

== Track listing ==
All tracks are written by Simon Neil and JP Reid

No.	Title	Length
1.	"Heartburn"	3:43
2.	"Everybody Dance"	2:48
3.	"Silhouettes"	2:17
4.	"Music Show"	3:25
5.	"Kid Gloves"	3:33
6.	"Demon"	7:35
7.	"Erotic Robotic"	3:55
8.	"Je Suis Un Funky Homme"	3:29
9.	"Rubber Lover"	1:54
10.	"Skin The Mofo"	2:20

== Personnel ==
- The Atmosphere (Simon Neil) - performance, production, recording
- The Dragon (JP Reid) - performance, production, recording
- The Octopus (Rich Costey) - mixing (at Electric Lady Studios, New York)
- Charlie Stavish - mixing assistant
- Noah Goldstein - mixing assistant
- Ben Bell - additional recording (at Mayfair Studios, London)
- Howie Weinberg - mastering (at Masterdisk, New York)
- Matthew Agoglia - mastering assistant
- Connie Mitchell - Vocals on "Kid Gloves".
- Fergus Munro - Tambourine on "Heartburn", drum sample on "Kid Gloves", hi-hats on "Je Suis Un Funky Homme", snare drum on "Rubber Lover"
- Michael Logg - Vocals on "Heartburn"
- Kevin Wstenberg - photography
- Hannah Edwards - costume design

== Chart positions ==
Chart (2009)	Peak position
Scotland Albums (OCC)	4
UK Albums (OCC)	14
Ireland (IRMA)	81
