= List of awards and nominations received by Thirty Seconds to Mars =

Thirty Seconds to Mars awards and nominations
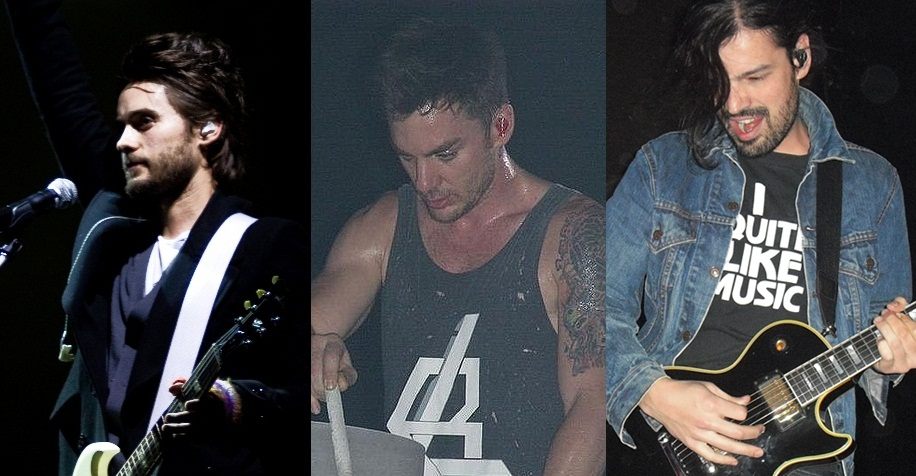
- Thirty Seconds to Mars (left to right): Jared Leto, Shannon Leto, Tomo Miličević
Awards and nominations
Award	Wins	Nominations
AltRock Awards	4	6
Bandit Rock Awards	1	2
Billboard Music Awards	1	6
Billboard Touring Awards	0	1
Bravo Otto Awards	1	2
Breakthrough of the Year Awards	1	1
BT Digital Music Awards	0	1
Camerimage	0	2
Clarín Awards	3	3
CMA Awards	2	4
Drummies Awards	1	3
Echo Music Prize	0	2
Fangoria Chainsaw Awards	2	2
Fuse Awards	1	2
Gotham Awards	1	1
Guinness World Records	1	1
iHeartRadio Music Awards	0	3
Kerrang! Awards	6	18
Live Lounge of the Year	0	2
Los Premios MSN	1	1
Los Premios MTV Latinoamérica	1	3
Loudwire Music Awards	1	1
MK	0	1
MTV Asia Awards	1	1
MTV Australia Awards	2	3
MTV Awards	1	1
MTV Europe Music Awards	9	17
MTV Fan Music Awards	2	4
MTV Italian Music Awards	4	10
MTV Video Music Awards	3	14
MTV Video Music Awards Japan	0	1
MTV Video Plays Awards	3	3
mtvU Woodie Awards	1	1
NME Awards	1	5
O Music Awards	2	5
Onstage Awards	0	2
Planeta Awards	2	5
Rock on Request Awards	19	19
Rockol Awards	0	2
Teen Choice Awards	0	1
TMF Awards	0	4
TMJ Awards	1	6
Toronto International Film Festival	1	1
TPi Awards	0	1
Shorty Awards	0	1
Ultimate Live Lounge	1	1
Virgin Media Music Awards	0	2
World Music Awards	0	1
Yahoo! Music Australia	1	1

Totals (Note: Certain award groups do not simply award one winner. They acknowledge several different recipients, have runners-up, and have third place. Since this is a specific recognition and is different from losing an award, runner-up mentions are considered wins in this award tally. For simplification and to avoid errors, each award in this list has been presumed to have had a prior nomination.)
- Wins: 82
- Nominations: 180

Thirty Seconds to Mars is an American rock band from Los Angeles, California. Formed in 1998, the band currently consists of Jared Leto on lead vocals and rhythm guitar, Shannon Leto on drums, and Tomo Miličević on lead guitar and keyboards. The band released the debut album 30 Seconds to Mars (2002) to limited success; it was their second album, A Beautiful Lie (2005), that pushed the band into the public eye. The album's success was boosted by the single "The Kill" and its subsequent music video, which received two nominations at the 2006 MTV Video Music Awards. The album spawned two Kerrang! Award-winning singles, "The Kill" and "From Yesterday". A Beautiful Lie was followed by This Is War (2009), which produced two Alternative Songs number one singles, "Kings and Queens" and "This Is War". The first single from the album, "Kings and Queens", received four nominations at the 2010 MTV Video Music Awards, winning Best Rock Video. "Hurricane" also earned the band's third Kerrang! Award for Best Single.

Thirty Seconds to Mars has received six Kerrang! Awards, three were Best International Band in 2008, 2010 and 2011. The band won nine MTV Europe Music Awards, including three Best Rock in 2007, 2008 and 2010, and four Best Alternative in 2011, 2013, 2014 and 2017. It has also received six nominations from the Billboard Music Awards, winning Modern Rock Artist of the Year. Thirty Seconds to Mars also achieved a place in Guinness World Records for most live shows during a single album cycle, with over 300 shows. This Is War and Love, Lust, Faith and Dreams (2013) were both nominated for the Echo Music Prize.

== AltRock Awards ==
The AltRock Award is presented annually by the American radio station i99Radio. Thirty Seconds to Mars has received four awards from six nominations.

Year	Nominee / work	Award	Result	Ref.
2014	Thirty Seconds to Mars	Artist of the Year	Won	
2014	Thirty Seconds to Mars	Best Online Performance	Won	
2014	"Do or Die"	Song of the Year	Nominated	
2018	Thirty Seconds to Mars (with Muse and PVRIS)	Tour of the Year	Won	
2018	Thirty Seconds to Mars (with Muse and PVRIS)	Best Online Performance	Nominated	
2018	"Walk on Water"	Song of the Year	Won	

== Bandit Rock Awards ==
The Bandit Rock Award is presented annually by the Swedish radio station of the same name. Thirty Seconds to Mars has received one award from two nominations.

Year	Nominee / work	Award	Result	Ref.
2008	Thirty Seconds to Mars	Breakthrough Artist – International	Won	
2008	A Beautiful Lie	Best Album – International	Nominated	

== Billboard Awards ==
=== Billboard Music Awards ===
The Billboard Music Awards are given to artists based on sales data by Nielsen SoundScan and radio information by Nielsen Broadcast Data Systems. The award ceremony was held from 1990 to 2007, until its reintroduction in 2011, but winners in many categories have been announced by Billboard both in the press and as part of their year-end issue. Thirty Seconds to Mars has received one award from six nominations.

Year	Nominee / work	Award	Result	Ref.
2006	"The Kill"	Modern Rock Single of the Year	Nominated	
2007	Thirty Seconds to Mars	Modern Rock Artist of the Year	Won	
2007	"From Yesterday"	Modern Rock Single of the Year	Nominated	
2010	Thirty Seconds to Mars	Top Alternative Artist	Nominated	
2010	Thirty Seconds to Mars	Top Rock Artist	Nominated	
2010	"This Is War"	Top Alternative Song	Nominated	

=== Billboard Touring Awards ===
The Billboard Touring Award is an annual meeting sponsored by Billboard which also honors the top international live entertainment industry artists and professionals. Thirty Seconds to Mars has received one nomination.

Year	Nominee / work	Award	Result	Ref.
2014	Carnivores Tour	Eventful Award for Tour of the Year	Nominated	

== Bravo Otto Awards ==
The Bravo Otto Awards is an annual awards ceremony presented by the German magazine Bravo to honor the year's biggest achievements in music, movies, sports and television. Thirty Seconds to Mars has received one award from two nominations.

Year	Nominee / work	Award	Result	Ref.
2011	Thirty Seconds to Mars	Rock Group	Won	
2013	Thirty Seconds to Mars	International Duo/Group of the Year	Nominated	

== Breakthrough of the Year Awards ==
The Breakthrough of the Year Award is an annual awards ceremony presented by Penske Media Corporation. Jared Leto has been awarded once.

Year	Nominee / work	Award	Result	Ref.
2006	Jared Leto	Crossover Artist	Won	

== BT Digital Music Awards ==
The BT Digital Music Award was a British music award ceremony held annually until 2011. Thirty Seconds to Mars has received one nomination.

Year	Nominee / work	Award	Result	Ref.
2010	Thirty Seconds to Mars	Artist of the Year	Nominated	

== Camerimage ==
The Camerimage is an annual festival held in Poland dedicated to the celebration of cinematography. Thirty Seconds to Mars has received two nominations.

Year	Nominee / work	Award	Result	Ref.
2013	"Up in the Air"	Best Music Video	Nominated	
2013	"Up in the Air"	Best Cinematography in a Music Video	Nominated	

== Clarín Awards ==
The Clarín Award is an annual awards ceremony presented by the Argentine newspaper Clarín. Thirty Seconds to Mars has received three awards.

Year	Nominee / work	Award	Result	Ref.
2007	Thirty Seconds to Mars	Best International Band	Won	
2007	"From Yesterday"	Best Song	Won	
2007	"From Yesterday"	Best Video	Won	

== CMA Awards ==
The CMA Award was an annual awards ceremony to honor the year's biggest achievements in music, movies, sports and television in Germany. Thirty Seconds to Mars has received two awards from four nominations.

Year	Nominee / work	Award	Result	Ref.
2010	Thirty Seconds to Mars	Best International Band	Nominated	
2010	This Is War	Best International Album	Won	
2010	"Kings and Queens"	Best International Single	Nominated	
2010	"Closer to the Edge"	Best International Music Video	Won	

== Drummies Awards ==
The Drummies Awards is presented annually by the American magazine Drum!. Shannon Leto has received one award from three nominations.

Year	Nominee / work	Award	Result	Ref.
2009	Shannon Leto	Alternative Drummer	Nominated	
2011	Shannon Leto	Alternative Drummer	Nominated	
2012	Shannon Leto	Indie Drummer	Won	

== Echo Music Prize ==
The Echo Music Prize is awarded annually by the Deutsche Phono-Akademie (an association of recording companies in Germany) for outstanding achievements in the music industry. Thirty Seconds to Mars has received two nominations.

Year	Nominee / work	Award	Result	Ref.
2011	This Is War	Best International Rock/Alternative	Nominated	
2014	Love, Lust, Faith and Dreams	Best International Rock/Alternative	Nominated	

== Fangoria Chainsaw Awards ==
The Fangoria Chainsaw Award is presented annually by the American magazine Fangoria. Thirty Seconds to Mars has received two awards.

Year	Nominee / work	Award	Result	Ref.
2007	"The Kill"	Best Video Inspired by Film	Won	
2007	Jared Leto	Prince of Darkness	Won	

== Fuse Awards ==
The Fuse Award is presented periodically by the American music channel Fuse. Thirty Seconds to Mars has received one award from two nominations.

Year	Nominee / work	Award	Result	Ref.
2007	Thirty Seconds to Mars	Artist of the Year	Won	
2010	"Kings and Queens"	Best Video	Nominated	

== Gotham Awards ==
The Gotham Awards is an annual awards ceremony presented to the makers of independent films. Thirty Seconds to Mars has been awarded once.

Year	Nominee / work	Award	Result	Ref.
2012	Artifact	Audience Award	Won	

== Guinness World Records ==
The Guinness World Records is a reference book published annually, containing a collection of world records, both human achievements and the extremes of the natural world. Thirty Seconds to Mars currently holds one world record.

Year	Nominee / work	Award	Result	Ref.
2011	Into the Wild Tour	Most Shows Performed During an Album Cycle	Won	

== iHeartRadio Music Awards ==
The iHeartRadio Music Awards is an annual awards ceremony presented by iHeartRadio. Thirty Seconds to Mars has received two nominations.

Year	Nominee / work	Award	Result	Ref.
2018	"Walk on Water"	Alternative Rock Song of the Year	Nominated	
2018	"The Tribute Song"	Best Cover Song	Nominated	
2019	Thirty Seconds to Mars	Alternative Rock Artist of the Year	Nominated	

== Kerrang! Awards ==
The Kerrang! Award is presented annually by the British magazine Kerrang!. Thirty Seconds to Mars has received six awards from eighteen nominations.

Year	Nominee / work	Award	Result	Ref.
2007	Thirty Seconds to Mars	Best International Newcomer	Nominated	
2007	"The Kill"	Best Single	Won	
2008	Thirty Seconds to Mars	Best International Band	Won	
2008	Thirty Seconds to Mars	Best Live Band	Nominated	
2008	"From Yesterday"	Best Single	Won	
2008	"A Beautiful Lie"	Best Video	Nominated	
2010	Thirty Seconds to Mars	Best International Band	Won	
2010	Thirty Seconds to Mars	Best Live Band	Nominated	
2010	This Is War	Best Album	Nominated	
2010	"Kings and Queens"	Best Video	Nominated	
2011	Thirty Seconds to Mars	Best International Band	Won	
2011	Thirty Seconds to Mars	Best Live Band	Nominated	
2011	"Hurricane"	Best Single	Won	
2011	"Hurricane"	Best Video	Nominated	
2012	Thirty Seconds to Mars	Best International Band	Nominated	
2012	Jared Leto	Hero of the Year	Nominated	
2013	"Up in the Air"	Best Video	Nominated	
2014	"City of Angels"	Best Video	Nominated	

== Live Lounge of the Year ==
The Live Lounge of the Year was a competition presented by BBC Radio 1 to honor the best live performances on Live Lounge. Thirty Seconds to Mars has received two nominations.

Year	Nominee / work	Award	Result	Ref.
2011	"Bad Romance"	Live Lounge of the Year	Nominated	
2011	"This Is War"	Live Lounge of the Year	Nominated	

== Loudwire Music Awards ==
The Loudwire Music Award is presented annually by the American online magazine Loudwire. Thirty Seconds to Mars has been awarded once.

Year	Nominee / work	Award	Result	Ref.
2014	"City of Angels"	Best Video	Won	

== MK Awards ==
The MK Awards was an annual awards ceremony presented by the South African music channel MK. Thirty Seconds to Mars has received one nomination.

Year	Nominee / work	Award	Result	Ref.
2011	"Kings and Queens"	Best International Song	Nominated	

== MTV Awards ==
=== Los Premios MTV Latinoamérica ===
The Los Premios MTV Latinoamérica was the Latin American version of the MTV Video Music Awards. Thirty Seconds to Mars has received one award from three nominations.

Year	Nominee / work	Award	Result	Ref.
2007	Thirty Seconds to Mars	Best Rock Artist — International	Nominated	
2008	Thirty Seconds to Mars	Best Rock Artist — International	Won	
2008	Thirty Seconds to Mars	Best Fan Club	Nominated	

=== MTV Asia Awards ===
The MTV Asia Awards was an annual awards ceremony presented by MTV Asia. Thirty Seconds to Mars has been awarded once.

Year	Nominee / work	Award	Result	Ref.
2008	"A Beautiful Lie"	Best Video	Won	

=== MTV Australia Awards ===
The MTV Australia Awards was an annual awards ceremony presented by MTV Australia. Thirty Seconds to Mars has received two awards from three nominations.

Year	Nominee / work	Award	Result	Ref.
2007	"The Kill"	Video of the Year	Won	
2007	"The Kill"	Best Rock Video	Won	
2007	"The Kill"	Viewer's Choice	Nominated	

=== MTV Europe Music Awards ===
The MTV Europe Music Awards is an annual awards ceremony presented by Viacom International Media Networks to honor artists and music in pop culture. Thirty Seconds to Mars has received nine awards from seventeen nominations.

Year	Nominee / work	Award	Result	Ref.
2007	Thirty Seconds to Mars	Best Rock	Won	
2007	Thirty Seconds to Mars	Best Inter Act	Nominated	
2008	Thirty Seconds to Mars	Best Rock	Won	
2008	"A Beautiful Lie"	Best Video	Won	
2010	Thirty Seconds to Mars	Best Rock	Won	
2010	Thirty Seconds to Mars	Best World Stage Performance	Nominated	
2010	"Kings and Queens"	Best Video	Nominated	
2011	Thirty Seconds to Mars	Best Alternative	Won	
2011	Thirty Seconds to Mars	Best World Stage Performance	Won	
2011	Thirty Seconds to Mars	Biggest Fans	Nominated	
2013	Thirty Seconds to Mars	Best Alternative	Won	
2013	Thirty Seconds to Mars	Biggest Fans	Nominated	
2013	"Up in the Air"	Best Video	Nominated	
2014	Thirty Seconds to Mars	Best Alternative	Won	
2017	Thirty Seconds to Mars	Best Alternative	Won	
2018	Thirty Seconds to Mars	Best Alternative	Nominated	
2023	Thirty Seconds to Mars	Best Alternative	Nominated	

=== MTV Fan Music Awards ===
The MTV Fan Music Awards was an annual awards ceremony presented by MTV Networks. Thirty Seconds to Mars has received two awards from four nominations.

Year	Nominee / work	Award	Result	Ref.
2011	Thirty Seconds to Mars	Best Group	Nominated	
2011	Thirty Seconds to Mars	Best Rock	Won	
2011	"Hurricane"	Best Group Video	Won	
2011	Jared Leto	Best Fashion	Nominated	

=== MTV Italian Music Awards ===
The MTV Italian Music Awards is an annual awards ceremony presented by MTV Italy. Thirty Seconds to Mars has received four awards from ten nominations.

Year	Nominee / work	Award	Result	Ref.
2007	Thirty Seconds to Mars	Best New Artist	Won	
2008	Thirty Seconds to Mars	Best Band	Nominated	
2008	Thirty Seconds to Mars	Best Live	Nominated	
2008	Thirty Seconds to Mars	Best Cartello	Won	
2009	"A Beautiful Lie"	Playlist Generation	Won	
2010	Thirty Seconds to Mars	Best International Act	Nominated	
2011	Thirty Seconds to Mars	Best Band	Won	
2011	Jared Leto	Best Look	Nominated	
2014	Thirty Seconds to Mars	Best Artist	Nominated	
2015	Jared Leto	Best Band Blog or Twitter	Nominated	

=== MTV Video Music Awards ===
The MTV Video Music Awards is an annual awards ceremony presented by MTV to celebrate the top music videos of the year. Thirty Seconds to Mars has received three awards from fourteen nominations.

Year	Nominee / work	Award	Result	Ref.
2006	"The Kill"	Best Rock Video	Nominated	
2006	"The Kill"	MTV2 Award	Won	
2010	"Kings and Queens"	Video of the Year	Nominated	
2010	"Kings and Queens"	Best Rock Video	Won	
2010	"Kings and Queens"	Best Direction	Nominated	
2010	"Kings and Queens"	Best Art Direction	Nominated	
2011	"Hurricane"	Best Direction	Nominated	
2011	"Hurricane"	Best Editing	Nominated	
2011	"Hurricane"	Best Cinematography	Nominated	
2013	"Up in the Air"	Best Rock Video	Won	
2013	"Up in the Air"	Best Art Direction	Nominated	
2013	"Up in the Air"	Best Cinematography	Nominated	
2014	"City of Angels"	Best Cinematography	Nominated	
2018	"Walk on Water"	Best Rock	Nominated	
2023	"Stuck"	Best Alternative	Nominated	

=== MTV Video Music Awards Japan ===
The MTV Video Music Awards Japan is the Japanese version of the MTV Video Music Awards. Thirty Seconds to Mars has received one nomination.

Year	Nominee / work	Award	Result	Ref.
2014	"Up in the Air"	Best Group Video	Nominated	

=== MTV Video Plays Awards ===
The MTV Video Plays Award is presented annually by MTV to celebrate the most played music videos across its international networks. Thirty Seconds to Mars has received three awards.

Year	Nominee / work	Award	Result	Ref.
2008	"A Beautiful Lie"	MTV Gold Video Plays Award	Won	
2010	"Closer to the Edge"	MTV Gold Video Plays Award	Won	
2010	"Kings and Queens"	MTV Gold Video Plays Award	Won	

=== mtvU Woodie Awards ===
The mtvU Woodie Awards is an annual awards ceremony presented by mtvU. Thirty Seconds to Mars has been awarded once.

Year	Nominee / work	Award	Result	Ref.
2006	"The Kill"	Best Video Woodie – Live Action	Won	

== NME Awards ==
The NME Award is presented annually by the British magazine NME. Thirty Seconds to Mars has received one award from five nominations.

Year	Nominee / work	Award	Result	Ref.
2011	Jared Leto	Hottest Male	Nominated	
2012	Thirty Seconds to Mars	Best Fan Community	Nominated	
2012	Notes from the Outernet	Best Book	Nominated	
2012	Jared Leto	Hottest Male	Won	
2013	Thirty Seconds to Mars	Best Fan Community	Nominated	

== O Music Awards ==
The O Music Award is presented annually by Viacom to honor the art, creativity, personality and technology of music into the digital space. Thirty Seconds to Mars has received two awards from five nominations.

Year	Nominee / work	Award	Result	Ref.
2011	"Hurricane"	NSFW Music Video	Won	
2011	Echelon	Fan Army FTW	Nominated	
2012	Thirty Seconds to Mars	Best Online Concert Experience	Won	
2012	Echelon	Fan Army FTW	Nominated	
2013	Echelon	Fan Army FTW	Nominated	

== Onstage Awards ==
The Onstage Awards is a set of awards for live music production. Thirty Seconds to Mars has received two nominations.

Year	Nominee / work	Award	Result	Ref.
2015	Thirty Seconds to Mars	Best Fan Community	Nominated	
2019	Thirty Seconds to Mars	Best International Band	Nominated	

== Planeta Awards ==
The Planeta Award is presented annually by the Peruvian radio station of the same name. Thirty Seconds to Mars has received two awards from five nominations.

Year	Nominee / work	Award	Result	Ref.
2007	Thirty Seconds to Mars	Group of the Year	Nominated	
2007	Thirty Seconds to Mars	Rock Artist of the Year	Won	
2007	"The Kill"	Song of the Year	Won	
2007	"The Kill"	Rock Song of the Year	Nominated	
2007	"The Kill"	Best Male Vocal Interpretation	Nominated	

== Rock on Request Awards ==
The Rock on Request Award was presented annually by the American online magazine Rock on Request. Thirty Seconds to Mars has received nineteen awards.

Year	Nominee / work	Award	Result	Ref.
2007	Thirty Seconds to Mars	Artist of the Year	Won	
2007	A Beautiful Lie	Best Album	Won	
2007	"From Yesterday"	Best Male Rock Vocal Performance	Won	
2007	"From Yesterday"	Best Song	Won	
2007	"From Yesterday"	Best Video	Won	
2007	Jared Leto	Frontman of the Year	Won	
2007	Echelon/Mars Army	Best Fan Community	Won	
2008	Thirty Seconds to Mars	Best Alternative	Won	
2008	Thirty Seconds to Mars	Best Modern Rock	Won	
2008	"A Beautiful Lie"	Best Song	Won	
2008	"A Beautiful Lie"	Best Video	Won	
2008	A Beautiful Lie European Tour	Best Festival/Tour	Won	
2008	Jared Leto	Frontman of the Year	Won	
2009	Thirty Seconds to Mars	Best Alternative	Won	
2009	Thirty Seconds to Mars	In a Class by Themselves	Won	
2009	This Is War	Best Album	Won	
2009	"Kings and Queens"	Best Song	Won	
2009	"Kings and Queens"	Best Video	Won	
2009	Jared Leto	Frontman of the Year	Won	

== Rockol Awards ==
The Rockol Award is presented annually by the Italian online magazine Rockol. Thirty Seconds to Mars has received two awards.

Year	Nominee / work	Award	Result	Ref.
2018	Thirty Seconds to Mars	Best Live – International	Nominated	
2018	America	Best Album – International	Nominated	

== Teen Choice Awards ==
The Teen Choice Award is an annual awards ceremony to honor the year's biggest achievements in music, movies, sports and television, being voted by young people aged between 13 and 19. Thirty Seconds to Mars has received one nomination.

Year	Nominee / work	Award	Result	Ref.
2011	Thirty Seconds to Mars	Rock Group	Nominated	

== TMF Awards ==
The TMF Awards was an annual awards ceremony presented by The Music Factory. Thirty Seconds to Mars has received four nominations.

Year	Nominee / work	Award	Result	Ref.
2007	Thirty Seconds to Mars	Best New Artist – International	Nominated	
2007	Thirty Seconds to Mars	Best Alternative – International	Nominated	
2008	Thirty Seconds to Mars	Best Rock – International	Nominated	
2008	"A Beautiful Lie"	Best Video – International	Nominated	

== TMJ Awards ==
The TMJ Award was presented annually by the American radio TMJ. Thirty Seconds to Mars has received one award from six nominations.

Year	Nominee / work	Award	Result	Ref.
2010	Thirty Seconds to Mars	Artist of the Year	Nominated	
2010	Thirty Seconds to Mars	Best Live Show	Nominated	
2010	Thirty Seconds to Mars	Favorite Band/Group	Nominated	
2010	This Is War	Album of the Year	Nominated	
2010	"Kings and Queens"	Song of the Year	Nominated	
2010	"Kings and Queens"	Best Rock Song	Won	

== Toronto International Film Festival ==
The Toronto International Film Festival is an eleven-day film festival held in Toronto, Ontario. Thirty Seconds to Mars has been awarded once.

Year	Nominee / work	Award	Result	Ref.
2012	Artifact	People's Choice Award for Best Documentary	Won	

== TPi Awards ==
The TPi Awards is presented annually by the British magazine TPi to honor the top international live entertainment industry artists and professionals. Thirty Seconds to Mars has received one nomination.

Year	Nominee / work	Award	Result	Ref.
2015	Love, Lust, Faith and Dreams Tour	Live Production of The Year	Nominated	

== Shorty Awards ==
The Shorty Award is an annual awards event recognizing the people and organizations producing real-time short form content across social web. Thirty Seconds to Mars has received one nomination.

Year	Nominee / work	Award	Result	Ref.
2012	Thirty Seconds to Mars	Best Band	Nominated	

== Virgin Media Music Awards ==
The Virgin Media Music Awards is an annual awards ceremony presented by Virgin Media. Thirty Seconds to Mars has received two nominations.

Year	Nominee / work	Award	Result	Ref.
2007	"The Kill"	Best Video	Nominated	
2007	Jared Leto	Most Fanciable Male	Nominated	

== World Music Awards ==
The World Music Awards is an international awards show to honor recording artists based on worldwide sales figures provided by the International Federation of the Phonographic Industry (IFPI). Thirty Seconds to Mars has received one nomination.

Year	Nominee / work	Award	Result	Ref.
2014	Love, Lust, Faith and Dreams	World's Best Album	Nominated	

== Miscellaneous awards and honors ==
Year	Nominated work	Award	Nominator
2007	"From Yesterday"	Greatest Epic Video of All Time	Yahoo! Music Australia
2009	"Stronger"	Ultimate Live Lounge	BBC Radio 1
2011	"This Is War"	Video of the Year	MSN
2011	"Hurricane" (Unplugged)	Best Live MTV Performance	MTV
