= Tour EP 1 =

EP by Nomeansno
- Released: April 30, 2010
- Recorded: 2010
- Genre: Punk rock
- Length: 25:35
- Label: Wrong Records
- Producer: Nomeansno

Nomeansno singles and EPs chronology
Generic Shame (2001)	Tour EP 1 (2010)	Tour EP 2 (2010)

Tour EP 1 (alternatively called Old) is an EP from Vancouver punk rock band Nomeansno. Released in 2010 on the band's Wrong Records imprint, the four-song EP was issued as a thumb drive and 12" vinyl EP in support of Nomeansno's 2010 touring. Tour EP 1 and its sequel Tour EP 2 were originally intended as the first half of a four-EP series, but this series was never completed. They were Nomeansno's final releases before their 2016 breakup.

== Background, recording, and release ==
Nomeansno toured extensively behind their 2006 album All Roads Lead to Ausfahrt. After a break from activity, bassist and principal songwriter Rob Wright recorded a batch of new demo songs on ProTools. The songs entailed a turn away from the pop-punk influence of Ausfahrt, an album written in large part by drummer John Wright, and a revisiting of the dark and brooding sound of previous albums, including Why Do They Call Me Mr. Happy? and One.

Nomeansno recorded some of Rob Wright's new songs as Tour EP 1 and the subsequent Tour EP 2, which also included the Ausfahrt outtake "Perambulate." They recorded and mixed the material with Paul Forgues. Tour EP 1 was initially released on a thumb drive for sale during the band's 2010 touring, and was later issued on colored vinyl as a 12" EP on the band's own Wrong Records. The band cited their success as a live band as the impetus for releasing records specifically in support of their tours.

== Reception ==
The EP was received well by critics. Writing for The Georgia Straight, Allan MacInnis praised the EP for its experimentation but assessed the results as mixed. MacInnis ultimately called the EP "intriguing." A critic writing for Van Music called the album the "perfect follow-up" to All Roads Lead to Ausfahrt and praised Nomeansno for their longevity and ability to "adapt, change, and somehow remain the same."

== Track listing ==
All songs written by Nomeansno.

1. Faceless May (6:02)
2. Slave (4:04)
3. Old (8:08)
4. Something Dark Against Something Light (7:22)

== Personnel ==
Nomeansno

- Tom Holliston – guitar, vocals
- John Wright – vocals, drums, keyboards
- Rob Wright – vocals, bass

Production and design

- Nomeansno and Paul Forgues – recording, mixing
- Rob Wright – original artwork
- Liz Atteberry – design
- John Chedsey – liner notes
- Giovanna Di Francesco – photography
