= Rubber Lover =

Rubber Lover may refer to:

- "Rubber Lover" (Deee-Lite song)
- "Rubber Lover" (Marmaduke Duke song)

== See also ==
- Rubber's Lover, 1996 film
- Latex and PVC fetishism
