= One Way Mirror =

One Way Mirror may refer to:

- One-way mirror
- "One Way Mirror" (song), a song by Kinesis
