= The Hidden Perils of Dancing =

The Hidden Perils Of Dancing

EP by Sucioperro
- Released: 11 November 2004
- Recorded: Soundmagic Studios, Ayr
- Length: 12:06
- Label: Adorno Records; RTM007CD
- Producer: Sucioperro

Sucioperro chronology
Why Bliss Destroy (2002)	The Hidden Perils Of Dancing (2004)	Tour EP #1 (2005)

The Hidden Perils Of Dancing is the second EP released by Sucioperro on 11 November 2004 through Adorno Records. It was distributed to stores through Cargo as well as being sold at the band's gigs. Its entire pressing of 1,000 copies sold out quickly and it is now a sought after CD.

The EP features "The Drop", which is the only track from the first two EPs to appear on the debut album Random Acts of Intimacy, for which it was re-recorded and later released as a single in 2006.

== Track listing ==
No.	Title	Length
1.	"Imitation Heaven"	2:56
2.	"Found You Makin"	3:10
3.	"The Drop"	3:44
4.	"The Hidden Perils of Dancing"	2:47

== Personnel ==
- JP Reid - Vocals and guitar
- Mike Logg - Bass and vocals
- Brendan Reilly - Drums
- Chris McMillan - Engineer
