= Hell Is for Heroes =

Hell Is for Heroes may refer to:

- Hell Is for Heroes (band), a UK band
  - Hell Is for Heroes (album), a 2007 album released by the band of the same name
- Hell Is for Heroes (film), a 1962 film starring Steve McQueen and Bobby Darin
- "I Kiss My Sweetie With My Fist/Hell Is For Heroes", a hidden track on Four Year Strong's album It's Our Time
