= Kid Gloves (Marmaduke Duke song) =

Single by Marmaduke Duke

from the album Duke Pandemonium
- Released: 2 March 2009
- Genre: Alternative rock; dance-pop; funk
- Length: 3:30
- Label: 14th Floor
- Songwriters: Simon Neil; JP Reid
- Producers: JP Reid; Simon Neil

Marmaduke Duke singles chronology
| "Kid Gloves" (2009) | "Rubber Lover" (2009) |

"Kid Gloves" is a 2009 single released by Scottish band Marmaduke Duke as the lead single from their second studio album Duke Pandemonium (2009). A remix of the song was created by Russell Leetch, which NME described as "should help to cheer up those smokers outside the hospital doors". Commercially, it debuted at number twelve on the UK Physical Singles Charts, and at number four on the singles charts in their native Scotland.

== Background ==
"Kid Gloves" has been described as the band members' favourite, claiming "it's a highly emotional and beautiful song". Loud and Quiet said that the songs lyrics, particularly, "Are we crazy or are we glad? Keep your instincts to make a stand Keep on searching for what we had To remind us all", goes "its ambiguous but resolute refrain, capable of being interpreted a thousand different ways". Loud and Quiet described the song as "not the sound that you’d expect to be produced by a pair of tattooed beards".

Simon Neil said that "Kid Gloves" was "a lot more cohesive" than the sound the band produced for their debut album, The Magnificent Duke (2005), and said that "it's a dance record really – or our attempt to make a dance record". NME described the song as "an electronic horizon", in which the band "come up with three dreamlike minutes of pop wonderment".

== Reception ==
Female First magazine described the song as "crafted with precision and love", and that it "doesn't disappoint one bit". The BBC said that, "understandably", the success the band experienced with the single "took them by surprise".

== Track listings ==
- 7″ single (UK)
1. "Kid Gloves" – 3:30
2. "New York Telephone Conversation Part 2 (Without Bowie)" – 1:41
3. "Kid Gloves (For Boys)" – 3:30

== Charts ==
Chart performance for "Kid Gloves"
| Chart (2009) | Peak position |
|---|---|
| Scotland (OCC) | 4 |
| UK Physical Singles (OCC) | 12 |
