= A-Z of the Live Lounge =

- Hosted by: Fearne Cotton
- Judges: Audience

Release
- Original network: BBC Radio 1
- Original release: 10 January – 10 June 2011

A-Z of the Live Lounge is a competition run by BBC Radio 1, between archive live lounge performances with the same first letter of their name (e.g. Adele, Arctic Monkey, etc.). It began in January 2011 and ended in June in that very same year and followed on from Live Lounge of 2010 (the first week back after Christmas for regular morning host Fearne Cotton), as the competition style was popular with the audience.

== A ==
Broadcast Date	Artist	Song	Winner
10 January 2011	Adele	Chasing Pavements	Make You Feel My Love (Bob Dylan) by Adele
10 January 2011	Adele	Last Nite (The Strokes)	Make You Feel My Love (Bob Dylan) by Adele
10 January 2011	Adele	Make You Feel My Love (Bob Dylan)	Make You Feel My Love (Bob Dylan) by Adele
11 January 2011	Avril Lavigne	Sk8er Boi	Wires by Athlete
11 January 2011	Alien Ant Farm	Movies	Wires by Athlete
11 January 2011	Athlete	Wires	Wires by Athlete
12 January 2011	Arctic Monkeys	You Know I'm No Good (Amy Winehouse)	Love Machine (Girls Aloud) by Arctic Monkeys
12 January 2011	Arctic Monkeys	When The Sun Goes Down	Love Machine (Girls Aloud) by Arctic Monkeys
12 January 2011	Arctic Monkeys	Love Machine (Girls Aloud)	Love Machine (Girls Aloud) by Arctic Monkeys
13 January 2011	Ash	Girl From Mars	Girl From Mars by Ash
13 January 2011	The Automatic	Gold Digger (Kanye West)	Girl From Mars by Ash
13 January 2011	Asher Roth	Boom Boom Pow (Black Eyed Peas)	Girl From Mars by Ash

== B ==
Broadcast Date	Artist	Song	Winner
14 January 2011	Basement Jaxx	Romeo	Livin' on a Prayer by Bon Jovi
14 January 2011	Beastie Boys	Intergalactic	Livin' on a Prayer by Bon Jovi
14 January 2011	Bon Jovi	Livin' on a Prayer	Livin' on a Prayer by Bon Jovi
17 January 2011	Beyoncé	Irreplaceable	Halo (Beyoncé) by Florence & The Machine
17 January 2011	Florence & The Machine	Halo (Beyoncé)	Halo (Beyoncé) by Florence & The Machine
17 January 2011	Marmaduke Duke	Single Ladies (Beyoncé)	Halo (Beyoncé) by Florence & The Machine
21 January 2011	Blue	All Rise	I Miss You by Blink-182
21 January 2011	Black Eyed Peas	Boom Boom Pow	I Miss You by Blink-182
21 January 2011	Blink-182	I Miss You	I Miss You by Blink-182
24 January 2011	Biffy Clyro	Love Sex Magic (Ciara)	Killing in the Name Of (Rage Against the Machine) by Biffy Clyro
24 January 2011	Biffy Clyro	Umbrella (Rihanna)	Killing in the Name Of (Rage Against the Machine) by Biffy Clyro
24 January 2011	Biffy Clyro	Killing in the Name Of (Rage Against the Machine)	Killing in the Name Of (Rage Against the Machine) by Biffy Clyro

== C ==
Broadcast Date	Artist	Song	Winner
25 January 2011	Craig David	Fill Me In	Dreaming of You by The Coral
25 January 2011	The Coral	Dreaming of You	Dreaming of You by The Coral
25 January 2011	City High	What Would You Do?	Dreaming of You by The Coral
26 January 2011	Coldplay	The Scientist	Yellow by Coldplay
26 January 2011	Coldplay	Yellow	Yellow by Coldplay
26 January 2011	Coldplay	Don't Panic	Yellow by Coldplay
28 January 2011	Chase & Status	Let You Go	Let You Go by Chase & Status
28 January 2011	Cheryl Cole	Parachute	Let You Go by Chase & Status
28 January 2011	Chipmunk	I'm Not Alone (Calvin Harris)	Let You Go by Chase & Status

== D ==
Broadcast Date	Artist	Song	Winner
31 January 2011	Dave Grohl	My Hero	Everlong by Dave Grohl
31 January 2011	Dave Grohl	Everlong	Everlong by Dave Grohl
31 January 2011	Dave Grohl	Times Like These	Everlong by Dave Grohl
2 February 2011	Dizzee Rascal	Bonkers	That's Not My Name (The Ting Tings) by Dizzee Rascal
2 February 2011	Dizzee Rascal	That's Not My Name (The Ting Tings)	That's Not My Name (The Ting Tings) by Dizzee Rascal
2 February 2011	Dizzee Rascal	Holiday	That's Not My Name (The Ting Tings) by Dizzee Rascal
3 February 2011	Destiny's Child	Say My Name	Babylon by David Gray
3 February 2011	David Gray	Babylon	Babylon by David Gray
3 February 2011	Dido	Here With Me	Babylon by David Gray

== E ==
Broadcast Date	Artist	Song	Winner
4 February 2011	Electric Six	Danger! High Voltage	How Come (D12) by Embrace
4 February 2011	Estelle	American Boy	How Come (D12) by Embrace
4 February 2011	Embrace	How Come (D12)	How Come (D12) by Embrace
14 February 2011	Elbow	One Day Like This	One Day Like This by Elbow
14 February 2011	Elbow	Independent Women (Destiny's Child)	One Day Like This by Elbow
14 February 2011	Elbow	1 Thing (Amerie)	One Day Like This by Elbow
15 February 2011	The Enemy	Away From Here	Only Girl (Rihanna) by Ellie Goulding
15 February 2011	Ellie Goulding	Only Girl (Rihanna)	Only Girl (Rihanna) by Ellie Goulding
15 February 2011	Example	Teenage Dream (Katy Perry)	Only Girl (Rihanna) by Ellie Goulding
16 February 2011	Eminem	Stan/Forever	Stan/Forever by Eminem
16 February 2011	The Pretty Reckless	Love The Way You Lie (Eminem)	Stan/Forever by Eminem
16 February 2011	The Script	Lose Yourself (Eminem)	Stan/Forever by Eminem

== F ==
Broadcast Date	Artist	Song	Winner
17 February 2011	Feeder	Buck Rogers	Sugar, We're Goin Down by Fall Out Boy
17 February 2011	The Fray	Hips Don't Lie (Shakira)	Sugar, We're Goin Down by Fall Out Boy
17 February 2011	Fall Out Boy	Sugar, We're Goin Down	Sugar, We're Goin Down by Fall Out Boy
22 February 2011	Florence & The Machine	Rabbit Heart (Raise It Up)	Halo (Beyoncé) by Florence & The Machine
22 February 2011	Florence & The Machine	Halo (Beyoncé)	Halo (Beyoncé) by Florence & The Machine
22 February 2011	Florence & The Machine	You've Got The Love from (Reading Festival)	Halo (Beyoncé) by Florence & The Machine
23 February 2011	Fightstar	Battlefield (Jordin Sparks)	Hounds of Love (Kate Bush) by The Futureheads
23 February 2011	Fleet Foxes	Mykonos	Hounds of Love (Kate Bush) by The Futureheads
23 February 2011	The Futureheads	Hounds of Love (Kate Bush)	Hounds of Love (Kate Bush) by The Futureheads

== G ==
Broadcast Date	Artist	Song	Winner
25 February 2011	Girls Aloud	Call The Shots	The Promise by Girls Aloud
25 February 2011	Girls Aloud	With Every Heartbeat (Robyn)	The Promise by Girls Aloud
25 February 2011	Girls Aloud	The Promise	The Promise by Girls Aloud

== H ==
Broadcast Date	Artist	Song	Winner
28 February 2011	Hard-Fi	Seven Nation Army (The White Stripes)	Wearing My Rolex (Wiley) by Hot Chip
28 February 2011	The Hoosiers	Love Stoned (Justin Timberlake)	Wearing My Rolex (Wiley) by Hot Chip
28 February 2011	Hot Chip	Wearing My Rolex (Wiley)	Wearing My Rolex (Wiley) by Hot Chip

== I ==
Broadcast Date	Artist	Song	Winner

== J ==
Broadcast Date	Artist	Song	Winner
1 March 2011	Jamiroquai	Love Foolosophy	Better Together by Jack Johnson
1 March 2011	Jack Johnson	Better Together	Better Together by Jack Johnson
1 March 2011	James Morrison	Sex on Fire (Kings of Leon)	Better Together by Jack Johnson
2 March 2011	Jet	Are You Gonna Be My Girl	Times Like These (Foo Fighters) by JoJo
2 March 2011	Just Jack	Live Your Life (T.I.)	Times Like These (Foo Fighters) by JoJo
2 March 2011	JoJo	Times Like These (Foo Fighters)	Times Like These (Foo Fighters) by JoJo
3 March 2011	Jamelia	Numb (Linkin Park)	Encore by Jay-Z
3 March 2011	Jason Derulo	Ridin' Solo	Encore by Jay-Z
3 March 2011	Jay-Z	Encore	Encore by Jay-Z

== K ==
Broadcast Date	Artist	Song	Winner
7 March 2011	Kylie Minogue	Can't Get You Out of My Head	Underdog (Kasabian) by Kelly Roland
7 March 2011	Kaiser Chiefs	Time to Pretend (MGMT)	Underdog (Kasabian) by Kelly Roland
7 March 2011	Kelly Roland	Underdog (Kasabian)	Underdog (Kasabian) by Kelly Roland
9 March 2011	McFly	I Kissed A Girl (Katy Perry)	California Gurls (Katy Perry) by Bruno Mars
9 March 2011	Bruno Mars	California Gurls (Katy Perry)	California Gurls (Katy Perry) by Bruno Mars
9 March 2011	Example	Teenage Dreams (Katy Perry)	California Gurls (Katy Perry) by Bruno Mars
10 March 2011	Kelly Clarkson	Since U Been Gone	Mr Brightside by The Killers
10 March 2011	Keane	This Is The Last Time	Mr Brightside by The Killers
10 March 2011	The Killers	Mr Brightside	Mr Brightside by The Killers
11 March 2011	Kasabian	Out of Space (The Prodigy)	Underdog by Kasabian
11 March 2011	Kasabian	The Sweet Escape (Gwen Stefani)	Underdog by Kasabian
11 March 2011	Kasabian	Underdog	Underdog by Kasabian
14 March 2011	Katy Perry	Electric Feel (MGMT)	Electric Feel (MGMT) by Katy Perry
14 March 2011	Klaxons	Bad Romance (Lady Gaga)	Electric Feel (MGMT) by Katy Perry
14 March 2011	The Kooks	Crazy (Gnarls Barkley)	Electric Feel (MGMT) by Katy Perry
15 March 2011	The Fray	Heartless (Kanye West)	Stronger (Kanye West) by Thirty Seconds to Mars
15 March 2011	The Automatic	Gold Digger (Kanye West)	Stronger (Kanye West) by Thirty Seconds to Mars
15 March 2011	Thirty Seconds to Mars	Stronger (Kanye West)	Stronger (Kanye West) by Thirty Seconds to Mars

== L ==
Broadcast Date	Artist	Song	Winner
18 March 2011	Lily Allen	Naive (The Kooks)	Naive (The Kooks) by Lily Allen
18 March 2011	Leona Lewis	Run (Snow Patrol)	Naive (The Kooks) by Lily Allen
18 March 2011	Lemar	I Believe in a Thing Called Love (The Darkness)	Naive (The Kooks) by Lily Allen
21 March 2011	Lady Gaga	Poker Face	Poker Face (Lady Gaga) by You Me at Six
21 March 2011	You Me at Six	Poker Face (Lady Gaga)	Poker Face (Lady Gaga) by You Me at Six
21 March 2011	Mika	Poker Face (Lady Gaga)	Poker Face (Lady Gaga) by You Me at Six
22 March 2011	Lupe Fiasco	Superstar	Last Summer by Lostprophets
22 March 2011	Last Shadow Puppets	SOS (Rihanna)	Last Summer by Lostprophets
22 March 2011	Lostprophets	Last Summer	Last Summer by Lostprophets

== M ==
Broadcast Date	Artist	Song	Winner
23 March 2011	My Chemical Romance	Song 2 (Blur)	Song 2 (Blur) by My Chemical Romance
23 March 2011	Marina & The Diamonds	Starstrukk (3OH!3)	Song 2 (Blur) by My Chemical Romance
23 March 2011	Mystery Jets	Two Doors Down	Song 2 (Blur) by My Chemical Romance
24 March 2011	Marmaduke Duke	Single Ladies (Put a Ring on It) (Beyoncé)	Shake It by Metro Station
24 March 2011	Metro Station	Shake It	Shake It by Metro Station
24 March 2011	The Magic Numbers	Crazy in Love (Beyoncé)	Shake It by Metro Station
28 March 2011	Marilyn Manson	What Goes Around...Comes Around (Justin Timberlake)	Cousins (Vampire Weekend) by Mumford & Sons
28 March 2011	Mumford & Sons	Cousins (Vampire Weekend)	Cousins (Vampire Weekend) by Mumford & Sons
28 March 2011	Mika	Grace Kelly	Cousins (Vampire Weekend) by Mumford & Sons
29 March 2011	Mark Ronson & The Business Intl	Bang Bang Bang	Our Velocity by Maxïmo Park
29 March 2011	Maxïmo Park	Our Velocity	Our Velocity by Maxïmo Park
29 March 2011	Mylo	In My Arms	Our Velocity by Maxïmo Park
30 March 2011	Muse	Time Is Running Out	Time Is Running Out by Muse
30 March 2011	Mini Viva	Left My Heart in Tokyo	Time Is Running Out by Muse
30 March 2011	Moloko	The Time Is Now	Time Is Running Out by Muse

== N ==
Broadcast Date	Artist	Song	Winner
4 April 2011	Noisettes	When You Were Young (The Killers)	The Man Who Can't Be Moved/Breakeven (The Script) by N-Dubz
4 April 2011	N-Dubz	The Man Who Can't Be Moved/Breakeven (The Script)	The Man Who Can't Be Moved/Breakeven (The Script) by N-Dubz
4 April 2011	Nickelback	Rockstar	The Man Who Can't Be Moved/Breakeven (The Script) by N-Dubz
6 April 2011	Nelly Furtado	I'm Like A Bird	I'm Like A Bird by Nelly Furtado
6 April 2011	Nelly Furtado	Maneater	I'm Like A Bird by Nelly Furtado
6 April 2011	Nelly Furtado	Crazy (Gnarls Barkley)	I'm Like A Bird by Nelly Furtado

== O ==
Broadcast Date	Artist	Song	Winner
7 April 2011	OPM	Heaven Is A Halfpipe	Heaven Is A Halfpipe by OPM
7 April 2011	Orson	Bright Idea	Heaven Is A Halfpipe by OPM
7 April 2011	Outkast	Ms Jackson	Heaven Is A Halfpipe by OPM
8 April 2011	Oasis	Wonderwall	Half the World Away by Oasis
8 April 2011	Oasis	Don't Look Back in Anger	Half the World Away by Oasis
8 April 2011	Oasis	Half the World Away	Half the World Away by Oasis

== P ==
Broadcast Date	Artist	Song	Winner
12 April 2011	Paramore	Use Somebody (Kings of Leon)	Use Somebody (Kings of Leon) by Paramore
12 April 2011	The Pretty Reckless	Miss Nothing	Use Somebody (Kings of Leon) by Paramore
12 April 2011	Plan B	Pass Out (Tinie Temper)	Use Somebody (Kings of Leon) by Paramore
13 April 2011	Paolo Nutini	Time to Pretend (MGMT)	Sexy Chick (David Guetta) by Paloma Faith
13 April 2011	Pixie Lott	When Love Takes Over (David Guetta ft.Kelly Rowland)	Sexy Chick (David Guetta) by Paloma Faith
13 April 2011	Paloma Faith	Sexy Chick (David Guetta)	Sexy Chick (David Guetta) by Paloma Faith
15 April 2011	Pendulum	The Island	The Island by Pendulum
15 April 2011	Pendulum	The Catalyst (Linkin Park)	The Island by Pendulum
15 April 2011	Pendulum	Violet Hill (Coldplay)	The Island by Pendulum
18 April 2011	Pink	Family Portrait	Nine in the Afternoon by Panic! at the Disco
18 April 2011	Panic! at the Disco	Nine in the Afternoon	Nine in the Afternoon by Panic! at the Disco
18 April 2011	Plain White T's	Higher (The Saturdays)	Nine in the Afternoon by Panic! at the Disco

== Q ==
Broadcast Date	Artist	Song	Winner
20 April 2011	Queens of the Stone Age	No One Knows	No One Knows by Queens of the Stone Age

== R ==
Broadcast Date	Artist	Song	Winner
20 April 2011	Robbie Williams	Human (The Killers)	Golden Touch by Razorlight
20 April 2011	Roll Deep	Airplanes (B.o.B Ft. Hayley Williams)	Golden Touch by Razorlight
20 April 2011	Razorlight	Golden Touch	Golden Touch by Razorlight
21 April 2011	Robyn	Dancing on My Own	With Every Heartbeat by Robyn
21 April 2011	Robyn	Try Sleeping with a Broken Heart (Alicia Keys)	With Every Heartbeat by Robyn
21 April 2011	Robyn	With Every Heartbeat	With Every Heartbeat by Robyn
26 April 2011	Rihanna	Hate That I Love You	Umbrella (Rihanna) by Biffy Clyro
26 April 2011	Ellie Goulding	Only Girl (In the World) (Rihanna)	Umbrella (Rihanna) by Biffy Clyro
26 April 2011	Biffy Clyro	Umbrella (Rihanna)	Umbrella (Rihanna) by Biffy Clyro

== S ==
Broadcast Date	Artist	Song	Winner
27 April 2011	Semisonic	Secret Smile	Secret Smile by Semisonic
27 April 2011	Shakira	Hips Don't Lie	Secret Smile by Semisonic
27 April 2011	Sugababes	Living for the Weekend (Hard-Fi)	Secret Smile by Semisonic
3 May 2011	Snow Patrol	Run	Run by Snow Patrol
3 May 2011	Scouting For Girls	Don't Stop Believin' (Journey)	Run by Snow Patrol
3 May 2011	The Streets	Let's Push Things Forward	Run by Snow Patrol
5 May 2011	Stereophonics	Hurry Up and Wait	Dakota by Stereophonics
5 May 2011	Stereophonics	Local Boy in the Photograph	Dakota by Stereophonics
5 May 2011	Stereophonics	Dakota	Dakota by Stereophonics
9 May 2011	The Saturdays	Higher	Drop It Like It's Hot by Snoop Dogg
9 May 2011	Starsailor	Don't Stop Movin' (S Club 7)	Drop It Like It's Hot by Snoop Dogg
9 May 2011	Snoop Dogg	Drop It Like It's Hot	Drop It Like It's Hot by Snoop Dogg
10 May 2011	The Script	The Man Who Can't Be Moved	Times Like These (Foo Fighters) by The Script
10 May 2011	The Script	Lose Yourself (Eminem)	Times Like These (Foo Fighters) by The Script
10 May 2011	The Script	Times Like These (Foo Fighters)	Times Like These (Foo Fighters) by The Script
11 May 2011	Scissor Sisters	Laura	All the Lovers (Kylie Minogue) by Scissor Sisters
11 May 2011	Scissor Sisters	Filthy/Gorgeous	All the Lovers (Kylie Minogue) by Scissor Sisters
11 May 2011	Scissor Sisters	All the Lovers (Kylie Minogue)	All the Lovers (Kylie Minogue) by Scissor Sisters

== T ==
Broadcast Date	Artist	Song	Winner
12 May 2011	Taylor Swift	White Blank Page (Mumford & Sons)	White Blank Page (Mumford & Sons) by Taylor Swift
12 May 2011	The Ting Tings	Shut Up and Let Me Go	White Blank Page (Mumford & Sons) by Taylor Swift
12 May 2011	Travie McCoy	Billionaire	White Blank Page (Mumford & Sons) by Taylor Swift
13 May 2011	Tinchy Stryder Ft. Taio Cruz	Take Me Back	Sweet Dreams/Beat Again (Beyoncé Knowles/JLS) by Tinchy Stryder Ft. Amelle Berrabah
13 May 2011	Tinchy Stryder Ft. Amelle Berrabah	Sweet Dreams/Beat Again (Beyoncé Knowles/JLS)	Sweet Dreams/Beat Again (Beyoncé Knowles/JLS) by Tinchy Stryder Ft. Amelle Berrabah
13 May 2011	Tinchy Stryder	Kickstarts (Example)	Sweet Dreams/Beat Again (Beyoncé Knowles/JLS) by Tinchy Stryder Ft. Amelle Berrabah
25 May 2011	Tinie Temper	Frisky	Sweet Disposition by The Temper Trap
25 May 2011	The Temper Trap	Sweet Disposition	Sweet Disposition by The Temper Trap
25 May 2011	Taio Cruz	Higher	Sweet Disposition by The Temper Trap
26 May 2011	Take That	Patience	Pray by Take That
26 May 2011	Take That	The Flood	Pray by Take That
26 May 2011	Take That	Pray	Pray by Take That

== U ==
Broadcast Date	Artist	Song	Winner
27 May 2011	U2	Beautiful Day	Beautiful Day by U2

== V ==
Broadcast Date	Artist	Song	Winner
27 May 2011	The Veronicas	Uprising (Muse)	Same Jeans by The View
27 May 2011	Vampire Weekend	Run	Same Jeans by The View
27 May 2011	The View	Same Jeans	Same Jeans by The View

== W ==
Broadcast Date	Artist	Song	Winner
31 May 2011	The Wombats	Moving To New York	Price Tag (Jessie J) by The Wombats
31 May 2011	The Wombats	Anti-D	Price Tag (Jessie J) by The Wombats
31 May 2011	The Wombats	Price Tag (Jessie J)	Price Tag (Jessie J) by The Wombats
1 June 2011	The White Stripes	My Doorbell	Seven Nation Army by The White Stripes
1 June 2011	The White Stripes	Icky Thump	Seven Nation Army by The White Stripes
1 June 2011	The White Stripes	Seven Nation Army	Seven Nation Army by The White Stripes
2 June 2011	The Wanted	Animal (Neon Trees)	Teenage Dirtbag by Wheatus
2 June 2011	Wretch 32	Unorthodox	Teenage Dirtbag by Wheatus
2 June 2011	Wheatus	Teenage Dirtbag	Teenage Dirtbag by Wheatus
7 June 2011	Will Young	All Time Love	All Time Love by Will Young
7 June 2011	Will Young	Your Game	All Time Love by Will Young
7 June 2011	Will Young	Hey Ya! (Outkast)	All Time Love by Will Young

== X ==
Broadcast Date	Artist	Song	Winner

== Y/Z ==
Broadcast Date	Artist	Song	Winner
8 June 2011	You Me at Six	Starry Eyed (Ellie Goulding)	Destiny by Zero 7
8 June 2011	Zero 7	Destiny	Destiny by Zero 7
8 June 2011	The Zutons	Valerie	Destiny by Zero 7

== 0-9 ==
Broadcast Date	Artist	Song	Winner
9 June 2011	Thirty Seconds to Mars	This Is War	Stronger (Kanye West) by Thirty Seconds to Mars
9 June 2011	Thirty Seconds to Mars	Stronger (Kanye West)	Stronger (Kanye West) by Thirty Seconds to Mars
9 June 2011	Thirty Seconds to Mars	Bad Romance (Lady Gaga)	Stronger (Kanye West) by Thirty Seconds to Mars
10 June 2011	50 Cent	21 Questions	In da Club by 50 Cent
10 June 2011	50 Cent	In da Club	In da Club by 50 Cent
10 June 2011	3Oh!3	My First Kiss	In da Club by 50 Cent
10 June 2011	3Oh!3	Guns and Horses (Ellie Goulding)	In da Club by 50 Cent
