= Pain Agency =

Studio album by Sucioperro
- Released: (United Kingdom) 4 May 2009
- Recorded: The Lair, Ayr, Scotland
- Length: 48:23
- Label: Maybe Records; MAYBE003
- Producer: Sucioperro, Chris Sheldon

Sucioperro chronology
Random Acts Of Intimacy (2008)	Pain Agency (2009)	The Heart String & How To Pull It (2011)

Singles from Pain Agency
- 1. "Mums' Bad Punk Music" Released: 17 November 2008; 2. "Don't Change (What You Can't Understand)" Released: 27 April 2009

Professional ratings
Review scores
Source	Rating
NME	7/10 stars
Rock Sound	8/10 stars

Pain Agency is the second album by Scottish rock band Sucioperro, released on 4 May 2009 by Maybe Records.

== Overview ==
Pain Agency was recorded in the band's studio in Ayr between June and October 2007. A video entitled 'The Making of Pain Agency' was created and posted on the band's YouTube page.

'Dragon's Pain Agency', a diary of events between the 10 June – 12 July written by the lead singer, was made available online from 16 July 2007 and includes information about recording developments, song titles, eating habits and progress through the computer game 'Black'.

The artwork for the Pain Agency era was designed by bassist Stewart Chown and Gordon Burniston. The style was carried across to the official Sucioperro website, which was also designed by Chown, until the site was updated for the release of the band's third album, The Heart String & How To Pull It.

Although the official release date was 4 May, the album became available to purchase at gigs from 27 April to coincide with the start of a substantial UK tour. A promotional copy of the album appeared on eBay on 13 April but was withdrawn by the seller later that day, apparently at the request of the record label.

A deluxe digital download, which contains extensive bonus material related to the Pain Agency era, was made available from the band's online shop in 2010.

== Track listing ==
No.	Title	Length
1.	"Liquids"	4:42
2.	"The Dissident Code"	3:51
3.	"Mums' Bad Punk Music"	3:56
4.	"Are You Convinced?"	4:36
5.	"Don't Change (What You Can't Understand)"	3:49
6.	"Hate Filters"	7:22
7.	"You Can't Lose (What You Don't Have)"	3:54
8.	"Conception Territory"	4:18
9.	"No. 273"	5:28
10.	"I Have Reached My Limit"	6:25

Bonus tracks on Deluxe Digital Reissue (2010)
No.	Title	Length
11.	"Ghosts And Shadows (Previously Unreleased)"	4:20
12.	"Animals And Other Silent Types (Previously Unreleased)"	4:37
13.	"We Are The Mirrors In The Mirrors Of Each Other"	3:12
14.	"Crush-ed"	1:51
15.	"Pain Agency"	2:53
16.	"Lizard Tongue"	1:47
17.	"+ve/-ve"	3:12
18.	"Riverside Method"	4:15
19.	"Blonde Parade"	2:50
20.	"Dirty Dirty Sick Sick"	3:16

=== Editions ===
- Digipack CD
- A deluxe download that includes:
  - Album versions of The Dissident Code and Mums' Bad Punk Music replaced with Single and EP mixes respectively
  - Previously unreleased tracks, Ghosts And Shadows and Animals And Other Silent Types
  - Pain Agency era b-sides
  - A .pdf of the album booklet including lyrics for all songs and credits, extended to include additional tracks
  - An audio commentary
  - 'Making Of...' video documentary
  - A .pdf of 'Diary Of A Dragon'

== Personnel ==
- Vocals, guitars, drums, bass, keyboards and percussion: JP Reid & Fergus Munro
- Production, Arrangement, Engineering and Composing: Sucioperro
- Mixing: Chris Sheldon
- Mastering: Richard Kayvan
- Additional vocals: Janine Fearn, Jamie Lenman (on 'Are You Convinced'), Craig B (on 'Conception Territory'), Michael Logg & David Rossi
- Additional guitars: David Aird
