= Kinesis (band) =

- Origin: Bolton, England
- Genres: Alternative rock
- Years active: 2000–2005
- Labels: White Noise Recordings (2001); Crystal Songs (2002); Independiente (2002–2004); Captains of Industry (2005)
- Past members: Michael Bromley; Conor McGloin; Tom Marshall; Neil Chow
- Website: Myspace Fansite

Kinesis were an alternative rock band from Bolton, England. The group formed in September 2000 whilst at school, and split after five years in June 2005. During this time they recorded two full studio albums, a mini album and several singles under three record labels.

== Members ==
The band consisted of Michael Bromley (vocals, guitar), Neil Chow (drums, vocals), Tom Marshall (bass guitar, vocals) and Conor McGloin (guitar)

== Recording history ==
Their first recording was the five track, self-released EP, The Flowers Are Dead, which was followed up by a mini-album, Worship Yourself. This mini-album was released on the band's own 'White Noise Recordings' record label. At that time, the ages of the band ranged from 16 to 18. Rave reviews of Worship Yourself in publications such as Kerrang! helped the band build up a dedicated, if small, fan base in the UK. The band signed a recording contract with Independiente in 2002.

They released their first full-length album Handshakes For Bullets in September 2003 on Independiente. The band toured the UK on a number of occasions, and also played concerts in New York City (as part of the CMJ music festival), Texas (as part of the South By Southwest festival) and Tokyo. Kinesis played concerts supporting numerous bands, the most prominent of which were; Linkin Park, Muse, Manic Street Preachers, Biffy Clyro, Hundred Reasons and Lostprophets. They also performed on a number of their own headline tours.

The band parted with Independiente, in mid-2004. Their second album You Are Being Lied to was released in June 2005 on the indie label Captains of Industry. The album was recorded and produced by the band themselves on a tight budget.

== Artistic comparisons ==
Kinesis were often compared to the Manic Street Preachers, because of their politically minded lyrics. Their first album covered subjects such as the North American Free Trade Agreement (NAFTA), euthanasia, as well as their views on the social habits of the British people, especially the younger generation to which they belong. The band were also known for their uniform style of dark blue jeans and white T-shirts.

== Split ==
The band split up amicably on the day that the latter album was released. Thus, many of the songs from the album were never performed live.

== Discography ==
=== Albums ===
- Handshakes For Bullets (September 2003)
- You Are Being Lied to (June 2005)

=== Singles ===
Date	Title	Album	UK
February 2002	"And They Obey"	Handshakes For Bullets	–
August 2002	"Everything Destroys Itself"	Handshakes For Bullets	–
October 2002	"Billboard Beauty"	Handshakes For Bullets	–
March 2003	"...And They Obey"	Handshakes For Bullets	No. 63
June 2003	"Forever Reeling"	Handshakes For Bullets	No. 65
September 2003	"One Way Mirror"	Handshakes For Bullets	No. 71

=== EPs ===
- Worship Yourself (February 2001)

=== Demos ===
- The Flowers Are Dead EP (December 2000)

=== Unreleased songs ===
Unreleased material from You Are Being Lied to sessions

- "Vibrations of Sincerity"
- "Your Sugar Is Poison"

Unreleased material from Handshakes for Bullets sessions or earlier

- "Beauty From Afar"
- "Conor1"
- "I Am The Light"
- "Night Time Song"
- "Save The Wales"
- "Something Is Coming"
- "The Boy with the Thorn in His Side" (Cover of The Smiths song)
- "These Forgotten Words"
