= All Roads Lead to Ausfahrt =

Studio album by Nomeansno
- Released: August 22, 2006
- Genre: Punk rock
- Length: 53:03
- Labels: Wrong, AntAcidAudio (North America); Southern (Europe)

Nomeansno chronology
One (2000)	All Roads Lead to Ausfahrt (2006)

All Roads Lead to Ausfahrt is the tenth and final studio album by Vancouver punk rock band Nomeansno. It was released by the band's own Wrong Records imprint, in conjunction with AntAcidAudio in North America and Southern Records in Europe, making it their first record not to be released by the Alternative Tentacles imprint since Mama in 1982. The album marked a return to shorter and more conventional songs than their previous efforts, Dance of the Headless Bourgeoisie (1998) and One (2000).

== Background and recording ==
Nomeansno split with their longtime label Alternative Tentacles in 2002, two years after the release of their ninth album, One. They began the process of re-releasing their albums on their own Wrong Records imprint, and issued their best-of album The People's Choice in 2004.

The band began rehearsing a batch of new songs for their tenth album in 2004, around the time of touring in support of The People's Choice. The new songs contained more songwriting input from drummer John Wright than those on the band's previous albums, which more typically have been dominated by his brother Rob (vocals and bass guitar). The songs also were generally shorter than the band's recent work, and the group consciously wrote an album in this style in reaction to several of their previous albums. John Wright remarked:

After One had come out, which was a fairly, well, not really dark album, but it was a "sit and listen to on your own" kind of record. With the longer songs, especially with "Bitches' Brew", I really enjoyed that and was really happy with it. I think it is one of our stronger records. But we thought, Dance of the Headless Bourgeoisie was a very obscure album and not our greatest effort, so Ausfahrt was like, let's do some short songs, 10 or 12 on the album, and keep it under 50 minutes, and just try to do something rocking...the group of songs we chose for Ausfahrt, it had a kind of flow – not earth shattering or really deep but that was a fairly conscious effort to do something that was a little more accessible.

The band recorded the album at the Hive Creative Labs and Lemon Loaf Studios in Vancouver. Hive Creative Labs was larger and more advanced than the studios in which the band had recorded their previous albums. They recorded 16 songs total during the sessions, including the 13 songs listed on the final album, the unlisted track "The Future Is the Past," and the outtakes "Perambulate" and "Black Silhouette." "Perambulate" was later released on Tour EP 2 (2010). The tracks were mixed at Hipposonic Studios and mastered at Gotham City Studios.

== Release ==
The album's title was inspired by the highway exit signs the band saw while touring in Germany—Ausfahrt is German for "exit"—and the cover art is styled after these exit signs. According to Rob Wright, the working title for the album was Nihilism for Dummies.

The album was released on August 22, 2006, by the band's own imprint, Wrong Records. It was co-released and distributed in North America by AntAcidAudio and in Europe by Southern Records. The six-year gap between One and All Roads Lead to Ausfahrt was the longest between albums in the band's career.

The band embarked upon extensive touring in support of the record. In total, they played 172 shows on the supporting tour and enjoyed the greatest financial success of their career.

== Reception ==
Professional ratings
Review scores
Source	Rating
AllMusic	4.5/5 stars
PopMatters	6/10
Punknews.org	3.5/5 stars

The record was generally received well and appreciated for its return to a rawer punk sound. In a glowing review, AllMusic critic Jo-Ann Greene praised the album's "rapid-fire series of dramatic images and aural impressions that leave the listener exhausted and sated by the end" and "musicianship that inevitably leaves one's mouth gaping." With a comparatively somber appraisal, Dusted's Doug Mosurock wrote reverently of the band's longevity but argued that the band had lost its strength with a batch of dragging and redundant songs. Similarly, PopMatters critic Ed Huyck praised the band's legacy but assessed the album as "extremely competent" but only "sometimes compelling" in a lukewarm review.

== Track listing ==
1. "Wake Up" – 2:35
2. "In Her Eyes" – 3:28
3. "Mr. in Between" – 3:17
4. "I See a Mansion in the Sky" – 6:31
5. "Ashes" – 3:31
6. "So Low" – 2:17
7. "Faith" – 4:33
8. "Heaven Is the Dust Beneath My Shoes" – 7:18
9. "Mondo Nihilissimo 2000" – 2:41
10. "The Hawk Killed the Punk" – 2:56
11. "I'm Dreaming and I Can't Wake Up" – 3:56
12. "'Til I Die" – 3:33
13. "Slugs Are Burning" – 3:00
14. (unlisted) "The Future Is the Past" – 3:27

== Personnel ==
=== Nomeansno ===
- Rob Wright – vocals, bass, guitar
- John Wright – vocals, drums, keyboards
- Tom Holliston – vocals, guitar

=== Additional musicians ===
- Robyn Carrigan – backing vocals (tracks 1, 6, 9, and 13)
- Bill Johnson – slide guitar (track 4)

=== Production and design ===
- Blair Calibaba – engineer
- Randy Iwata – layout
- Colin Stewart – assistant recording engineer
- Craig Waddell – mastering
- Amy Worobec – assistant engineer
