= Marmaduke Duke =

Scottish rock duo

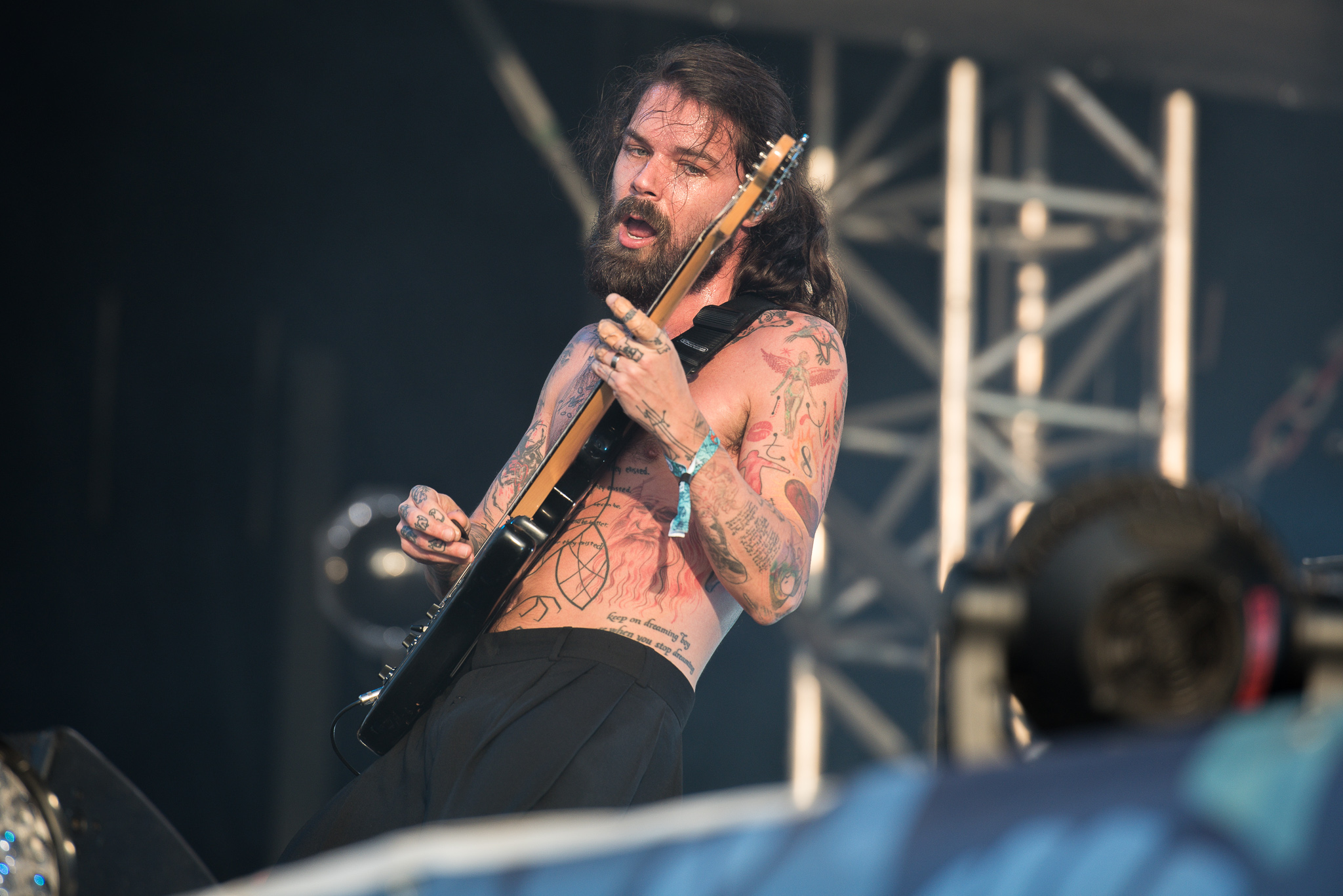
- Simon Neil ("The Atmosphere"), performing with Biffy Clyro in 2017

Background information
- Origin: Ayrshire, Scotland
- Genres: Alternative rock; indie pop; experimental rock; post-hardcore; acoustic rock; dance-pop; funk
- Years active: 2003–present
- Labels: Captains of Industry; 14th Floor
- Members: Simon Neil; JP Reid
- Website: themarmadukeduke.com

Marmaduke Duke are a Scottish conceptual rock duo from Ayrshire, Scotland, comprising Simon Neil of Biffy Clyro and JP Reid of Sucioperro. Within the band, the pair perform under the pseudonyms The Atmosphere and The Dragon respectively. According to Neil, the band, and its albums, are "based on a trilogy of unreleased manuscripts that a friend of ours brought to this country a few years ago. We're really just working to soundtrack those stories."

They released their debut album, The Magnificent Duke, in April 2005. It debuted at number thirty-seven on the UK Independent Albums Charts. The band returned in 2009 with the single "Kid Gloves" from their second album, Duke Pandemonium, which was released in May 2009. The albums second single, "Rubber Lover", became a commercial success in the United Kingdom following extensive airplay on radio, such as BBC Radio 1, and peaked at number twelve on the UK Singles Charts. The album achieved similar success, debuting at number four on the albums charts in their native Scotland, and at number fourteen in the United Kingdom.

In 2023, lead singer Simon Neil confirmed in an interview with NME that the bands third album was "progressing well", and claimed that it will be their last album as following its release "the duke will be dead".

== Career ==
=== Breakthrough and success (2003–2009) ===
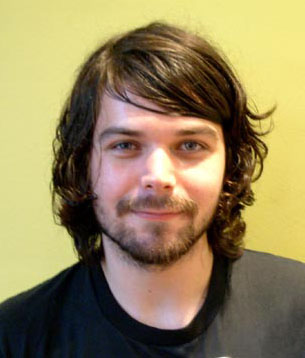
Lead singer Simon Neil around the time Marmaduke Duke were formed, c. 2003

Marmaduke Duke reputedly formed in 2003. However, prior recording and touring commitments to their own respective bands meant that it took until 2005 for the band's debut album, The Magnificent Duke, to be released. The release was limited to 4,000 copies, and was released via the Captains of Industry record label. Despite its limited release, commercially, the album peaked at number 37 on the UK Independent Albums Charts in 2009.

Following the release of their debut, both members returned to their respective bands, with Biffy Clyro releasing Puzzle in 2007, and Sucioperro releasing their debut album, Random Acts of Intimacy, in 2006. Following the promotional schedule for both releases, Marmaduke Duke returned in March 2009 with the release of the lead single, "Kid Gloves", from their second album, Duke Pandemonium. It marked the first chart appearance from the band in their native Scotland, reaching number 4 on the Scottish Singles Charts, and reached number 12 on the UK Physical Singles Sales Charts. The albums second single, "Rubber Lover", was released in April 2009, and after strong radio airplay became a commercial success in the United Kingdom where it debuted at number twelve on the national singles charts. The song samples "Sleeping with the Television On" by Billy Joel, with lead singer Simon Neil describing the song as a ""dirty pop-ode to a rubber doll". The album was originally scheduled for release in late 2006, and a three-track sampler CD was distributed to magazines and radio stations in spring 2006. However, due to the touring and recording commitments of Biffy Clyro, and the intervention of 14th Floor Records, the decision was made to postpone the album's release until Marmaduke Duke could actually tour and promote the new record.

For the album, the band adopted a more synthesiser based approach which was described as a radical departure from their previous musical style, and reflected in the style of two tracks – "Silhouettes" and "Everybody Dance", which previewed on their website prior to the album's launch. During live performances, again prior to the album's release, the band also performed the tracks "Erotic Robotic", "Music Show" and "Heartburn", confirming their inclusion on the then-forthcoming album. The album achieved similar commercial success, peaking at number four on the Scottish Albums Charts, where it spent four weeks within the Top 100. In the United Kingdom, it debuted at number fourteen on the UK Albums Charts, remaining within the Top 100 for three weeks, whilst on the UK Download Albums Charts, it debuted at number eight. A third and final single was released from the album, "Silhouettes", in July 2009. It failed to match the success of its predecessor, and failed to make an appearance on any singles charts. In August 2009, they headlined the Festival Republic stage at the Reading Festival.

=== Recent work and hiatus (2009–) ===
According to JP Reid, the band's one-song conclusion to the musical trilogy, The Death of the Duke, will be "a modern classical two guitar death march. At the moment we’re working on riffs and rhythms." The band plan to record the album live at a concert, with contributions from 10 members of the audience. In 2019, when asked on Twitter about when the album would be released, Reid replied: "I'd speculate sooner rather than later and when the time is right." Neil told NME in May 2020 that they have been close to finishing the new record "for about two years” and were due to finish it in March but were set back by the UK coronavirus lockdown.

In 2023, Neil disclosed to NME that work on the bands third album was progressing, and said that he acknowledges that the band is "already special and we will complete that, which John and I are a bit scared of". During the interview, Neil confirmed that the bands third album will be their last as Marmaduke Duke, saying that "once it is released, it's over, and the duke is dead". Neil told the Guardian in September 2025: "A third album is 80% finished but I’m now in Biffy mode."

== Live performances ==
Marmaduke Duke have thus far only played two small tours, during which they played at venues in Edinburgh, Dundee, London, Manchester, Glasgow, Newcastle, Cardiff and Birmingham. On 9 June 2009, they were added to the Reading & Leeds Festival lineup, headlining the Festival Republic Stage on the Friday in Reading and the Sunday in Leeds. Additionally, they also played T In the Park in 2009 on the Radio 1/NME stage.

Live, the group consists JP Reid (vocals, guitar) and Simon Neil (vocals, synth, guitar and bass). The duo are augmented by James Johnston (bass, vocals) and drummers Fergus Munro and Ben Johnston. There is usually also a cloaked/masked figure on stage during performances, known only as "The Duke"; played by Sucioperro's ex-bassist Michael Logg also known as "The Big Slice". This character might be construed as the band's own version of Public Enemy's Flavor Flav or the Happy Mondays' Bez.

Regarding the inclusion of Ben and James, Simon Neil states: "It wouldn't feel right to be out and playing without them, you know?"

== Tours ==
- Marmaduke Duke UK Tour (2009; with James and Ben Johnston)

== Discography ==
=== Albums ===
Year	Album details	Peak positions		
Year	Album details	SCO	UK	IRE
2005	The Magnificent Duke: Released: 14 April 2005; Label: Captains of Industry; Format: CD, digital download	–	— (Note: The Magnificent Duke did not enter the UK Albums Chart, but peaked at number 12 on the UK Independent Albums Chart.)	–
2009	Duke Pandemonium: Released: 11 May 2009; Label: 14th Floor; Format: CD, digital download	4	14	81

=== Singles ===
List of singles, with selected chart positions and certifications
Year	Title	Peak chart positions			Album
Year	Title	SCO	UK	IRE	Album
2009	"Kid Gloves"	4	— (Note: "Kid Gloves" did not enter the UK Singles Chart, but peaked at number 12 on the UK Physical Singles Chart.)	—	Duke Pandemonium
2009	"Rubber Lover"	—	12	42	Duke Pandemonium
2009	"Silhouettes"	—	— (Note: "Silhouettes" did not enter the UK Singles Chart, but peaked at number 31 on the UK Physical Singles Chart.)	—	Duke Pandemonium
