= The Neon Handshake =

Studio album by Hell Is for Heroes
- Released: 3 February 2003
- Genre: Post-hardcore
- Length: 42:19
- Label: EMI

Hell Is for Heroes chronology
The Neon Handshake (2003)	Transmit Disrupt (2005)

Professional ratings
Review scores
Source	Rating
BBC Music	Positive Review
Drowned in Sound	8/10 stars
NME	7/10 stars
Sputnikmusic	5/5 stars

The Neon Handshake is the debut album by London band Hell is For Heroes. The CD was released in February 2003 on Chrysalis Records.

Rock Sound magazine picked it as the "Album of the Year".

In 2005, readers of Kerrang! magazine voted The Neon Handshake the 58th best British rock album ever.

In 2018 the record was re-issued and released by Big Scary Monsters to coincide with the 15th anniversary of the band's debut release.

== Track listing ==
All tracks are written by Hell Is For Heroes.

No.	Title	Length
1.	"Five Kids Go"	3:44
2.	"Out Of Sight"	2:33
3.	"Night Vision"	3:34
4.	"Cut Down"	3:04
5.	"Few Against Many"	4:02
6.	"Three Of Clubs"	3:03
7.	"I Can Climb Mountains"	3:20
8.	"Diconnector"	3:26
9.	"You Drove Me To It"	3:01
10.	"Slow Song"	5:31
11.	"Sick / Happy"	3:08
12.	"Retreat"	3:44
Total length:		42:19

== Personnel ==
- Justin Schlosberg – vocals
- William McGonagle – guitar
- Tom O'Donoghue – guitar
- James Findlay – bass guitar
- Joe Birch – drums
- Pelle Henricsson – production, mastering, recording
- Eskil Lövström – production, mastering, recording
- Miles Wilson – sound engineering (assistant)
- Magnus Lindberg – sound engineering (assistant)
- Tom McShane – art direction, photography
