= Sleeping with the Television On =

- US B-side vinyl label

Song by Billy Joel

from the album Glass Houses
- A-side: "Modern Woman"
- Released: March 12, 1980
- Genre: Pop; rock
- Length: 3:02
- Label: Columbia
- Songwriter: Billy Joel
- Producer: Phil Ramone

"Sleeping with the Television On" is a song by American pianist Billy Joel from his 1980 album Glass Houses.

== Background ==
The song was inspired by Mike Cody's girlfriend. According to Billy Joel, Cody was "in the Rogues with me when we were fourteen years old" and would come into the studio with his girlfriend. Joel never got her name.

== Composition and lyrics ==
"Sleeping with the Television On" opens with the last few bars of the United States national anthem "The Star-Spangled Banner", a sign that an American television broadcast is signing off for the night. The lyrics themselves are about a hard to reach woman named Diane who is seen as a "superhero", rejecting every man who attempts to get close to her. The narrator wants to get to know Diane more, but to no avail, instead opting to sleep with his television on. In the second verse, the narrator decides to not help their relationship to grow.

== Recording ==
The organ solo is performed by Billy Joel on a Farfisa organ.

== Critical reception ==
USA Today critic Mellissa Ruggeriei ranked number 73 in her ranking of Joel's 75 best songs, stating it is a "Unapologetic, straightforward pop that finds Joel channeling his inner Joe Jackson". In a ranking of Joel's 50 best songs by Rolling Stone, it was placed number 49, stating it is a "sharp assessment of thorny romantic ambiguity that’s particularly reminiscent of Elvis Costello in its well observed lyrics, the bite and harried cadence in Joel’s delivery, and an organ solo that could’ve come right off Costello's This Year's Model." confirming Joel fans have wondered why it wasn't a single. When ranking every Billy Joel song for Vulture, it was placed number 4 by Christopher Bonanos, claiming it to be the "best Billy Joel song that was never a hit". Matt Mitchell of Paste magazine paced it number 2 in his ranking of the 25 greatest Billy Joel songs, calling it "easily one of the best tracks he ever made" noting that Joel calls it "an obscure song", but Mitchell believes it isn't. In a review of Glass Houses for the A.V. Club, David Brusie stated that it "may be the most underrated Billy Joel song".

== Live performances ==
A 2006 performance at the Shea Stadium appears on Live Through the Years, a 2019 Billy Joel live album. Joel performed the song alongside Phish guitarist Trey Anastasio at Madison Square Garden in 2024.

== Covers and samples ==
Marmaduke Duke sampled the song on their 2009 song "Rubber Lover".

== Sources ==
- Bielen, Ken (July 22, 2011). The Words and Music of Billy Joel. ABC-CLIO. ISBN 9780313380174.
- Bego, Mark (2007). Billy Joel: The Biography. Thunder's Mouth Press. ISBN 9781560259893.
