= Live Lounge of 2010 =

- Season 2010
- Hosted by: Fearne Cotton
- Judges: Audience
- Winner: Robyn
- Runner-up: Biffy Clyro

Release
- Original network: BBC Radio 1
- Original release: 10 January 2011

Season chronology
- ← Previous; Ultimate Live Lounge Next → A-Z of the Live Lounge

Live Lounge of 2010 was a competition to find the best Live Lounge cover of 2010. After the success of the Ultimate Live Lounge, BBC Radio 1 ran the competition for a second year but only live lounges of the previous year could enter. The competition had a similar format with listeners voting for their favourite performance to win. The first 2 rounds had 3 entries pitted against each other, whereas the Semi-Final was between 2 entries rather than 3 like the previous year.

Artist	Song	Round (Winner)		
Artist	Song	Quarter-Final	Semi-Final	Final
All Time Low	"Alejandro"	Chase and Status "Let You Go"	Thirty Seconds to Mars "Bad Romance"	1st Place Robyn "Dancing on My Own"
Leona Lewis	"Stop Crying Your Heart Out"	Chase and Status "Let You Go"	Thirty Seconds to Mars "Bad Romance"	1st Place Robyn "Dancing on My Own"
Chase and Status	"Let You Go"	Chase and Status "Let You Go"	Thirty Seconds to Mars "Bad Romance"	1st Place Robyn "Dancing on My Own"
Pendulum	"The Catalyst"	Thirty Seconds to Mars "Bad Romance"	Thirty Seconds to Mars "Bad Romance"	1st Place Robyn "Dancing on My Own"
Thirty Seconds to Mars	"Bad Romance"	Thirty Seconds to Mars "Bad Romance"	Thirty Seconds to Mars "Bad Romance"	1st Place Robyn "Dancing on My Own"
Marina and the Diamonds	"Starstrukk"	Thirty Seconds to Mars "Bad Romance"	Thirty Seconds to Mars "Bad Romance"	1st Place Robyn "Dancing on My Own"
Thirty Seconds to Mars	"This Is War"	Thirty Seconds to Mars "This Is War"	Thirty Seconds to Mars "This Is War"	1st Place Robyn "Dancing on My Own"
Professor Green	"Billionaire"	Thirty Seconds to Mars "This Is War"	Thirty Seconds to Mars "This Is War"	1st Place Robyn "Dancing on My Own"
Mumford and Sons	"The Cave"	Thirty Seconds to Mars "This Is War"	Thirty Seconds to Mars "This Is War"	1st Place Robyn "Dancing on My Own"
Kelly Rowland	"Underdog"	Kelly Rowland "Underdog"	Thirty Seconds to Mars "This Is War"	1st Place Robyn "Dancing on My Own"
Marina and the Diamonds	"I Am Not a Robot"	Kelly Rowland "Underdog"	Thirty Seconds to Mars "This Is War"	1st Place Robyn "Dancing on My Own"
Take That	"The Flood"	Kelly Rowland "Underdog"	Thirty Seconds to Mars "This Is War"	1st Place Robyn "Dancing on My Own"
Biffy Clyro	"Many of Horror"	Biffy Clyro "Many of Horror"	Biffy Clyro "Many of Horror"	2nd Place Biffy Clyro "Many of Horror"
Cheryl Cole	"Fireflies"	Biffy Clyro "Many of Horror"	Biffy Clyro "Many of Horror"	2nd Place Biffy Clyro "Many of Horror"
Ellie Goulding	"Sweet Disposition"	Biffy Clyro "Many of Horror"	Biffy Clyro "Many of Horror"	2nd Place Biffy Clyro "Many of Horror"
Diana Vickers	"Just Say Yes"	Ellie Goulding "Starry Eyed"	Biffy Clyro "Many of Horror"	2nd Place Biffy Clyro "Many of Horror"
Eminem	"Not Afraid"	Ellie Goulding "Starry Eyed"	Biffy Clyro "Many of Horror"	2nd Place Biffy Clyro "Many of Horror"
Ellie Goulding	"Starry Eyed"	Ellie Goulding "Starry Eyed"	Biffy Clyro "Many of Horror"	2nd Place Biffy Clyro "Many of Horror"
The Pretty Reckless	"Miss Nothing"	The Pretty Reckless "Miss Nothing"	Robyn "Dancing on My Own"	3rd Place Thirty Seconds to Mars "Bad Romance"
All Time Low	"Weightless"	The Pretty Reckless "Miss Nothing"	Robyn "Dancing on My Own"	3rd Place Thirty Seconds to Mars "Bad Romance"
Tinie Tempah	"Frisky"	The Pretty Reckless "Miss Nothing"	Robyn "Dancing on My Own"	3rd Place Thirty Seconds to Mars "Bad Romance"
McFly	"Dynamite"	Robyn "Dancing on My Own"	Robyn "Dancing on My Own"	4th Place Thirty Seconds to Mars "This Is War"
Robyn	"Dancing on My Own"	Robyn "Dancing on My Own"	Robyn "Dancing on My Own"	4th Place Thirty Seconds to Mars "This Is War"
Pixie Lott	"Forget You"	Robyn "Dancing on My Own"	Robyn "Dancing on My Own"	4th Place Thirty Seconds to Mars "This Is War"
