= Kinesis discography =

This is a discography of the Bolton, England rock band Kinesis.

== Discography ==
=== Studio albums ===
- Handshakes For Bullets (29 September 2003)
- You Are Being Lied to (6 June 2005)

==== You Are Being Lied To ====
You Are Being Lied to

Studio album by Kinesis
- Released: 6 June 2005
- Recorded: G-Skape Studios, Manchester
- Genre: Alternative rock
- Length: 33:00
- Label: Captains of Industry
- Producer: Kinesis

Kinesis chronology
Handshakes For Bullets (2003)	You Are Being Lied to (2005)

Professional ratings
Review scores
Source	Rating
Drowned In Sound	7/10 stars

You Are Being Lied to is Kinesis' second and follow up album to Handshakes For Bullets. It is also the final release made by the band just before they split up in 2005. Released 29 September 2003 by Captains of Industry and financed by the band.

Having been dropped by their former label, Independiente Records, in January 2004, the band still had songs left in them. Unable to find a new contract, they went about themselves, recording the new material at G-Scpae Studios Manchester during the summer of 2004. By autumn it was complete and taken on by small company Captains of Industry.

The record was finally released in 2005, and on the day of release, Kinesis announced that it would be no longer.

No singles were released from the album.

===== Track listing =====
1. "A Voice to Preserve – 3:23
2. "You Are Being Lied to" – 2:40
3. "Everything You Thought You Knew to Be" – 3:52
4. "Principles Are a Luxury" – 2:22
5. "Perception Management" – 3:35
6. "Like Vultures" – 3:31
7. "Have My Sympathy" – 3:08
8. "Rainbow in the Night" - 3:35
9. "A Prayer For Death" – 2:37
10. "The Question Has Changed" – 4:23

===== Personnel =====
- Michael Bromley (Vocals, Guitar, Keyboard)
- Conor McGloin (Guitar, Vocals)
- Tom Marshall (Bass guitar, Vocals)
- Neil Chow (Drums, Vocals)

=== Singles ===
Date	Title	Album	UK
18/10/2002	"Billboard Beauty"	"Handshakes For Bullets"	-
10/03/2003	"...And They Obey"	"Handshakes For Bullets"	#63
16/06/2003	"Forever Reeling"	"Handshakes For Bullets"	#65
15/09/2003	"One Way Mirror"	"Handshakes For Bullets"	#71

=== Non-mainstream singles ===
(Available For Purchase at Kinesis gigs)

- "And They Obey" (25 February 2002)
- "Everything Destroys Itself" (5 August 2002)

=== EPs ===
- Worship Yourself (February 2001)

=== Demos ===
- The Flowers Are Dead EP (December 2000)

=== Unreleased songs ===
Unreleased material from You Are Being Lied to sessions

- "Vibrations of Sincerity"
- "Your Sugar Is Poison"

- "Beauty From Afar"
- "Conor1"
- "I Am The Light"
- "Night Time Song"
- "Save The Wales"
- "Something Is Coming"
- "The Boy With The Thorn In His Side" (Smiths Cover)
- "These Forgotten Words"
