= The Magnificent Duke =

Studio album by Marmaduke Duke
- Released: 14 April 2005
- Length: 45:41
- Label: Captains of Industry; CAPT015

Marmaduke Duke chronology
The Magnificent Duke (2005)	Duke Pandemonium (2009)

Professional ratings
Review scores
Source	Rating
Rock Sound	7/10
rockfeedback.com	4/5 stars

The Magnificent Duke is the debut studio album by Scottish conceptual rock duo Marmaduke Duke, released on April 14, 2005, via the Captains of Industry recording label. The album initially had a limited run of 4,000 copies. Commercially, the album failed to make any immediate chart impact until 2009, when it debuted at number 37 on the UK Independent Albums Chart.

There were no singles released to promote the album, and all of the original 4,000 copies have the misspelling "The Kill and the Cure", rather than the intentional misspelling "The Kill and the Kure", in the booklet.

== Track listing ==
The album is split into three different sections.

When the world:

- Explodes – The heavy section which consists of tracks 1, 4, 7, 10, 13, and 16.
- Implodes – The acoustic section which consists of tracks 2, 5, 8, 11, 14, and 17.
- Corrodes – The instrumental section which consists of tracks 3, 6, 9, 12, 15, and 18.
1. "The Red and the Number"
2. "An Egyptian and an Imposter"
3. "Fridge and Fromage"
4. "The Kill and the Kure"
5. "A Fox and a Cake"
6. "Piggary and Peccary"
7. "The Kiss and the Consonant"
8. "An Imposter and a Magician"
9. "Paul and Alexander"
10. "The False and the Cinematic"
11. "An Eagle and an Eye"
12. "Coast and Guard"
13. "The Human and the Jigsaw"
14. "A Conspiracy and a Devil"
15. "Village and Minotaur"
16. "The Beaver and the Rabbit"
17. "A Curse and a Coyote"
18. "Blunder and Haggis"
