= Tour EP 2 =

EP by Nomeansno
- Released: 2010, 2013
- Recorded: 2010
- Genre: Punk rock
- Label: Wrong Records
- Producer: Nomeansno

Nomeansno singles and EPs chronology
| Tour EP 1 (2010) | Tour EP 2 (2010) |

Tour EP 2 (alternatively called Jubilation) is an EP from Vancouver punk rock band Nomeansno. Released in 2010 on the band's Wrong Records imprint, the four-song EP was issued as a thumb drive and 12" vinyl EP in support of Nomeansno's European tour late in 2010. It was reissued in 2013 and distributed by Southern Records. Tour EP 2 and its predecessor Tour EP 1 were originally intended as the first half of a four-EP series, but this series was never completed. They were Nomeansno's final releases before their 2016 breakup.

== Background, recording, and release ==
Nomeansno toured extensively behind their 2006 album All Roads Lead to Ausfahrt. After a break from activity, bassist and principal songwriter Rob Wright recorded a batch of new demo songs on ProTools. The songs entailed a turn away from the pop-punk influence of Ausfahrt, an album written in large part by drummer John Wright, and a revisiting of the dark and brooding sound of previous albums, including Why Do They Call Me Mr. Happy? and One.

Nomeansno recorded some of Rob Wright's new songs, along with the Ausfahrt outtake "Perambulate," as Tour EP 1 and Tour EP 2. They recorded and mixed the material with Paul Forgues. Tour EP 2 was initially released on a thumb drive and 12" vinyl single for sale during the band's late 2010 European touring, and was reissued on the band's own Wrong Records in 2013. The band cited their success as a live band as the impetus for releasing records specifically in support of their tours.

== Track listing ==
All songs written by Nomeansno.

1. Jubilation
2. All The Little Bourgeois Dreams
3. One And The Same
4. Perambulate

== Personnel ==
Nomeansno

- Tom Holliston – guitar, vocals
- John Wright – vocals, drums, keyboards
- Rob Wright – vocals, bass

Production and artwork

- Nomeansno and Paul Forgues – recording, mixing
