= The Heart String & How to Pull It =

Studio album by Sucioperro
- Released: (United Kingdom) 7 March 2011
- Recorded: The Lair, Scotland; Audio Lounge, Glasgow
- Length: 39:35
- Labels: Xtra Mile Recordings
- Producers: Sucioperro; Chris Sheldon; DP Johnson; Chris Gordon

Sucioperro chronology
Pain Agency (2008)	The Heart String & How to Pull It (2011)

Singles from The Heart String & How to Pull It
- 1. "Threads" Released: 6 December 2010; 2. "Reflexes Of The Dead" Released: 28 February 2011

Professional ratings
Review scores
Source	Rating
The Skinny	2/5 stars

The Heart String & How to Pull It is the third album by Scottish rock band Sucioperro, released on 7 March 2011 by Xtra Mile Recordings.

== Overview ==
The band financed the making of the album and completed most of the recording themselves at their beastin' studio, The Lair. The record was produced by the band, mixed by Chris Sheldon, and mastered by Chris Gordon. The artwork was once again done by bassist Stewart Chown, in collaboration with longtime Sucioperro photographer Gordon Burniston. In order to fund the publication and promotion of the album, and the March/April 2011 tour, the fan-funding intermediary Pledgemusic was used, which gave fans the opportunity to take up some special offers from the band. The Sucioperro Pledgemusic statement indicated that a percentage of profits would be donated to Alzheimer Scotland when the fundraising target was reached.

The album spawned two singles - "Threads" and "Reflexes of the Dead". Both were released as digital EPs, including 5 previously unreleased b-sides each.

Full details of the track listing and album artwork were released on 28 February, followed shortly by news of a fourteen date tour throughout England and Scotland, starting on 21 March and finishing on 8 April.

== Track listing ==
No.	Title	Length
1.	"Running From All That Doesn’t Tempt You"	4:16
2.	"Threads"	2:43
3.	"Reflexes of the Dead"	4:02
4.	"Out & Over"	3:49
5.	"I Jumped Into the Heart of a Black Situation"	3:20
6.	"Ideals Have Value"	3:31
7.	"Invisible Monsters"	4:24
8.	"Is That Why You Pull Me In?"	3:31
9.	"Delicious"	3:26
10.	"Landslide"	2:58
11.	"Hands"	3:21

== Pledges ==
Pledgers were offered various basic packages that included a physical copy of the album, a digital download of the album, a download of what became the Chemicals EP, an album-themed T-shirt and an album-themed poster. All of the basic packages included the option to download the album a few days in advance of the physical release.

Additionally, there were several special packages that were offered at premium prices. All of the special packages included a digital download of the album.

- Pledgers Only Listening Party with Q&A: Held in Glasgow on 18 February 2011, this gave the opportunity to listen to the album in full from the master CD and also ask the band some questions afterwards. It was also suggested that an acoustic performance might occur.
- Signed Drum Skins: Skins used by Gus, signed and with a message.
- Very Special Meet & Greet!: Available for the March/April 2011 UK tour, pledgers were offered the chance to attend the soundcheck and request one song during that time. In addition to meeting the band, a goodie bag was included, which was accompanied by tickets to the ensuing gig.
- Handwritten Lyric Sheet (£35): Pledgers could choose the lyrics of any song from Sucioperro's back catalogue to be handwritten by JP. A personal message from the band was also included.
- Signed Logo'd Drum Skin (£100): 22" kick drum display head used by Gus since joining the band and for over 200 shows. Signed by all the band.

== Personnel ==
Sucioperro

- JP Reid - Vocals, Guitars, Glock, Programming, Percussion
- Fergus Munro - Drums, Vocals, Programming, Perscussion, iPhone
- Stewart Chown - Bass, Vocals, Percussion

Additional Personnel

- Lauren Hazlett - Vocals
- David Rossi - Vocals (on "Ideals Have Value")
