= Why Bliss Destroy =

EP by Sucioperro
- Released: August 2002
- Length: 14:00
- Label: Self released
- Producer: Sucioperro

Sucioperro chronology
Why Bliss Destroy (2002)	The Hidden Perils Of Dancing (2004)

Why Bliss Destroy is the debut EP released by Sucioperro in August 2002 and features the original line up of JP Reid, Mike Logg, Dave Martin and (Skindog) Brendan Reilly.

"Love in the Guise of Friendship" is an arrangement of a poem by Scottish writer Robert Burns.

Three tracks feature the vocals of Biffy Clyro frontman Simon Neil.

== Track listing ==
No.	Title	Length
1.	"Hangover"	4:09
2.	"Virginia"	2:46
3.	"Love In The Guise Of Friendship"	3:56
4.	"Capable Of More"	3:52

== Personnel ==
- JP Reid - Vocals, Guitars
- Mike Logg - Bass
- Brendan Reilly - Drums
- Dave Martin - Guitar, Piano & Vocals
- Simon Neil - Vocals on "Hangover", "Love In The Guise" & "Capable Of More"
- Duncan MacFarlane - Guitar on "Love In The Guise"

== Recording ==
- All tracks recorded at Cava Studios, Glasgow.
- Engineered by Dave Paterson.
- Written, arranged and produced by Sucioperro.
