= Mums' Bad Punk Music =

EP by Sucioperro
- Released: 17 November 2008
- Length: 12:06
- Label: Maybe Records; MAYBE002
- Producer: Sucioperro, Chris Sheldon

Sucioperro chronology
Tour EP #1 (2005)	Mums' Bad Punk Music (2008)	The Dissident Code (2009)

Mums' Bad Punk Music is a single released by Sucioperro on 17 November 2008 through Maybe Records.

== Overview ==
The release of the band's second album, Pain Agency, was thwarted by several delays which prompted the release of "Mums' Bad Punk Music". The single contains a set of the band's heavier songs and, at the time, it gave some indication of what to expect from the forthcoming second album. Around the time of the release the band embarked on a small tour, including dates in Aberdeen, Edinburgh, Glasgow and London. The title track received airplay from BBC Radio One DJ, Vic Galloway.

== Track listing ==
No.	Title	Length
1.	"Mums' Bad Punk Music"	3:54
2.	"We Are The Mirrors In The Mirrors Of Each Other"	3:12
3.	"Crush-ed"	1:51
4.	"Pain Agency"	2:53

== Personnel ==
- Vocals, guitars, drums, bass and percussion: JP Reid & Fergus Munro
- Additional vocals: Michael Logg and Janine Fearn
- Additional guitars: David Aird
- Produced by Sucioperro
- Track 1 mixed by Chris Sheldon
- Artwork: Stuart Chown
