= Ultimate Live Lounge =

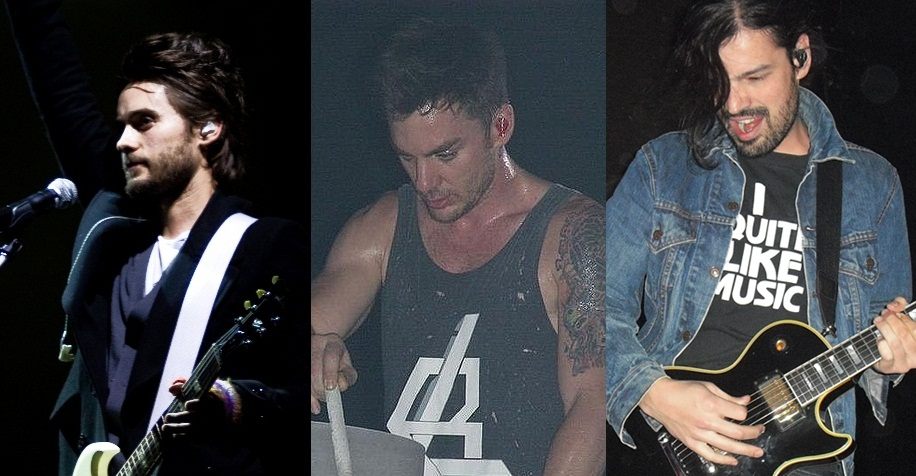
- 30 Seconds to Mars (left to right): Jared Leto, Shannon Leto, Tomo Miličević
- Hosted by: Fearne Cotton
- Judges: Audience
- Winner: Thirty Seconds to Mars
- Runner-up: Will Young

Release
- Original network: BBC Radio 1

Ultimate Live Lounge was a competition run by Radio 1 in 2009 to find the best Live Lounge performance to date. Over the previous 10 years there had been more than 500 Live Lounge sessions with hundreds of artists performing their single and an exclusive cover on air. After a series of heats, three semi-finals, and a weekend-long Grand Final, BBC Radio 1 listeners chose their Ultimate Live Lounge Cover, "Stronger" by Thirty Seconds to Mars.

Artist	Song	Round (winner)		
Artist	Song	Quarter-final	Semi-final	Final
Arctic Monkeys	"Love Machine"	Arctic Monkeys "Love Machine"	Thirty Seconds to Mars "Stronger"	1st place Thirty Seconds to Mars "Stronger"
Jamelia	"Numb"	Arctic Monkeys "Love Machine"	Thirty Seconds to Mars "Stronger"	1st place Thirty Seconds to Mars "Stronger"
Lady Gaga	"Viva la Vida"	Arctic Monkeys "Love Machine"	Thirty Seconds to Mars "Stronger"	1st place Thirty Seconds to Mars "Stronger"
Fightstar	"Battlefield"	Fightstar "Battlefield"	Thirty Seconds to Mars "Stronger"	1st place Thirty Seconds to Mars "Stronger"
My Chemical Romance	"Song 2"	Fightstar "Battlefield"	Thirty Seconds to Mars "Stronger"	1st place Thirty Seconds to Mars "Stronger"
Katy Perry	"Electric Feel"	Fightstar "Battlefield"	Thirty Seconds to Mars "Stronger"	1st place Thirty Seconds to Mars "Stronger"
Natasha Bedingfield	"The Scientist"	Thirty Seconds to Mars "Stronger"	Thirty Seconds to Mars "Stronger"	1st place Thirty Seconds to Mars "Stronger"
Thirty Seconds to Mars	"Stronger"	Thirty Seconds to Mars "Stronger"	Thirty Seconds to Mars "Stronger"	1st place Thirty Seconds to Mars "Stronger"
Jack Johnson	"My Doorbell"	Thirty Seconds to Mars "Stronger"	Thirty Seconds to Mars "Stronger"	1st place Thirty Seconds to Mars "Stronger"
Dizzee Rascal	"That's Not My Name"	Dizzee Rascal "That's Not My Name"	Florence and the Machine "Halo"	1st place Thirty Seconds to Mars "Stronger"
The Ting Tings	"Standing in the Way of Control"	Dizzee Rascal "That's Not My Name"	Florence and the Machine "Halo"	1st place Thirty Seconds to Mars "Stronger"
Embrace	"How Come"	Dizzee Rascal "That's Not My Name"	Florence and the Machine "Halo"	1st place Thirty Seconds to Mars "Stronger"
Marmaduke Duke	"Single Ladies"	Florence and the Machine "Halo"	Florence and the Machine "Halo"	2nd place Will Young "Hey Ya!"
Florence and the Machine	"Halo"	Florence and the Machine "Halo"	Florence and the Machine "Halo"	2nd place Will Young "Hey Ya!"
Paloma Faith	"Sexy Chick"	Florence and the Machine "Halo"	Florence and the Machine "Halo"	2nd place Will Young "Hey Ya!"
JoJo	"Times Like These"	Pendulum "Violet Hill"	Florence and the Machine "Halo"	2nd place Will Young "Hey Ya!"
Keane	"With Or Without You"	Pendulum "Violet Hill"	Florence and the Machine "Halo"	2nd place Will Young "Hey Ya!"
Pendulum	"Violet Hill"	Pendulum "Violet Hill"	Florence and the Machine "Halo"	2nd place Will Young "Hey Ya!"
The Script	"Times Like These"	The Script "Times Like These"	Will Young "Hey Ya!"	2nd place Will Young "Hey Ya!"
The Magic Numbers	"Crazy In Love"	The Script "Times Like These"	Will Young "Hey Ya!"	2nd place Will Young "Hey Ya!"
Mini Viva	"Heartbeat"	The Script "Times Like These"	Will Young "Hey Ya!"	2nd place Will Young "Hey Ya!"
Leona Lewis	"Run"	Leona Lewis "Run"	Will Young "Hey Ya!"	3rd place Florence and the Machine "Halo"
Paolo Nutini	"Time to Pretend"	Leona Lewis "Run"	Will Young "Hey Ya!"	3rd place Florence and the Machine "Halo"
Biffy Clyro	"Umbrella"	Leona Lewis "Run"	Will Young "Hey Ya!"	3rd place Florence and the Machine "Halo"
Will Young	"Hey Ya!"	Will Young "Hey Ya!"	Will Young "Hey Ya!"	3rd place Florence and the Machine "Halo"
Paramore	"Use Somebody"	Will Young "Hey Ya!"	Will Young "Hey Ya!"	3rd place Florence and the Machine "Halo"
King Blues	"Bonkers"	Will Young "Hey Ya!"	Will Young "Hey Ya!"	3rd place Florence and the Machine "Halo"
