= Hell Is for Heroes (band) =

English post-hardcore band

- Origin: Camden, London, England
- Genres: Post-hardcore, emo
- Years active: 2000–2008, 2012, 2018, 2021-present
- Labels: Burning Heart; Big Scary Monsters; EMI; Captains of Industry; Golf
- Members: Justin Schlosberg; William McGonagle; Tom O'Donoghue; James Findlay; Joe Birch
- Website: myspace.com/hellisforheros

Hell Is for Heroes are an English post-hardcore band from London. Founder members Will McGonagle and Joe Birch (previously of Symposium) were joined by James Findlay, Tom O'Donoghue and later Justin Schlosberg. The band played their formative shows in West London throughout 2001.

After two independently released singles, Hell Is for Heroes released their debut album in February 2003 on EMI. The Neon Handshake was produced and recorded in Los Angeles at Sound City Studios and mixed in Umeå, Sweden at Tonteknik by Pelle Henricsson and Eskil Lövström. The band's A&R was managed by Duncan Illing. The band and their A&R left EMI in 2004. The band released its second album Transmit Disrupt independently, before signing a deal with Burning Heart Records, who subsequently re-released it in 2006. Their final self-titled album was released through Golf Records in 2007. Their debut album was voted the 58th best British rock album ever, by the readers of Kerrang! magazine in the 19 February 2005 issue.

In October 2008, the band announced its indefinite hiatus. On 26 June 2012, it was announced that they are reforming to play three shows alongside Hundred Reasons and Cable in November. In 2018 the band toured the U.K. as part of The Neon Handshake's 15th anniversary, and once again announced their return to touring in 2021.

== History ==
=== Early days ===
Will McGonagle (guitar) and Joe Birch (drums) were previously in the British band Symposium. Their final release was in 1999 and, by the end of 2000, due to personal and musical differences, and problems with their record label, they had split up. Within two years, McGonagle and Birch began rehearsing with their former school friends, James Findlay (bass) and Tom O'Donoghue (guitar) with no intention to release any music. During a night out, they met Justin Schlosberg, formerly of the Raindogs, who joined as vocalist and they began taking the band seriously. They took the name "Hell Is for Heroes" in reference to the 1962 film of the same name, which Birch had read about in a book about films. In January 2001, they had performed their first gig at The Half Moon in Putney, London with minimal attendance. The first songs they wrote as a band were "Night Vision" and "I Can Climb Mountains".

In March that year they toured as support for Sunna, along with Biffy Clyro. In July 2001, they signed with EMI. It took all that year before Hell Is for Heroes released their debut single on Superior Quality Recordings. It was a double A-side, featuring two songs that would later appear on their debut album, "Sick/Happy" and "Cut Down". They recorded their debut album at the beginning of September 2001. While recording the September 11 attacks occurred, leading the band renamed many of their songs and changed many of their lyrics, due to references to the World Trade Center and jumping off of buildings.

In October and November, they toured the United Kingdom supporting American Hi-Fi then Three Doors Down. These were followed by a tour with Errortype: Eleven and Hundred Reasons, then various supporting Sparta, the Icarus Line, Murderdolls and Papa Roach. The band next released "You Drove Me To It" with the B-sides "Things Fall Apart" and "Kill the Silence" in January 2002. That year saw the release of two more singles, "I Can Climb Mountains" and "Nightvision". The latter track included "Folded Paper Figures" on the B-side, which became popular with their fanbase, and was later re-recorded and used on their second album.

=== The Neon Handshake ===
The Neon Handshake was issued in February 2003, and gained a positive reviews from the NME. It peaked at No. 16 in the UK Albums Chart. Hell is for Heroes' videos appeared regularly on major music television channels, and the band continued to tour across the UK keeping up their reputation as one of the premier live bands of the day. One performance of that time at The Astoria in London was filmed, and shown by MTV2. In early 2003, "You Drove Me To It", which had been re-mastered for the album version was re-released as a single. Shortly after the release of the album, the band went on tour with Feeder for five dates of their UK tour. Hell Is for Heroes' live appearances included the Carling Weekend Reading and Leeds Festival on the BBC Radio 1 stage. However, in 2004, changes within EMI saw Chrysalis Records, which owned the rights to Hell Is for Heroes closed down, and another subsidiary subsequently decide to part company with the band.

=== Transmit Disrupt ===
In May 2004, the band recorded their second album with the independent record label, Captains of Industry. The first single release was "One of Us", which did not enjoy their previous major label's promotion efforts. "Models for the Programme" was then followed by "Kamichi" before the album's release. Transmit Disrupt flopped at No. 89 in the UK chart.

In September 2005, Hell Is for Heroes signed with Burning Heart Records. Transmit Disrupt was re-released, and "Models for the Programme" was given a new video. In February 2006, the band announced on their website that they had "come out of hibernation", and "New Song" appeared on the band's website. This was followed by a tour and, in July, "Eject Eject Eject", was available for free download on Myspace.

=== Hell Is For Heroes and Break Up ===
In February 2007, Hell is for Heroes began their UK, Ireland and European tour. "You've Got Hopes" was placed on the band's Myspace page. In April the band released the track listing of their new album on their official site. In June the band's third, eponymous album was released on Golf Records. Reviews and interviews in Kerrang! brought the album to a wider audience and the band embarked upon a sponsored tour throughout June, playing the Barfly venues in the UK.

On 25 October 2007, Hell Is for Heroes stated:

Our forthcoming hop around the UK will be our last full length stint on the road before the reunion tour in 2037. We're up for spending more time at home working on other projects and potentially a fourth album if we can beat our last effort. Plus we reckon 7 years in the van is a fair stretch by any standards.

The band were forced to cancel three dates at the end of the 2007 tour due to illness. In October 2008, the band announced their final UK tour, with their final concert on 12 December 2008 at the Glasgow Barfly.

=== Reunions ===
In June 2012, the band announced that they will be supporting Hundred Reasons at their upcoming 10th Anniversary shows, playing The Neon Handshake in full along with other songs from their back catalogue. Guitarist Will McGonagle commented on the upcoming shows, "We’ve been friends with Hundred Reasons for over 10 years, so when they suggested playing our first records together it sounded like fun. We are really proud of all the music we’ve made together and look forward to getting together to smash out The Neon Handshake. The early 2000s were exciting times for British rock music. It was a special time for our bands, who toured together and forged strong friendships. Who knows, maybe one day there’ll be a Shatterproof/Transmit Disrupt show too.". In August 2017, the band announced that they would be going on a headline tour in February 2018 playing The Neon Handshake in full to celebrate that record's 15th anniversary.

On 27 March 2018 it was announced that Hell is for Heroes would appear at Download festival. They are due to appear on Friday 8 June on the 2nd stage. Second on the bill.

In 2021 the band announced a 9-date UK tour alongside Hundred Reasons, scheduled to take place in February and March 2022. It was later rescheduled to February and March 2023. In December 2022 they released their latest single 'I Should Never Have Been Here in the First Place' which is taken from the bands new 7" released via Big Scary Monsters.

== Musical style ==
Critics have categorised Hell is for Heroes' music as post-hardcore and emo. Their sound was built upon the dominant style of post-hardcore during their existence, but Hell is for Heroes diversified it by incorporating elements of post-punk, new wave and electronic music.

They cited influences including Fugazi, JR Ewing, Explosions in the Sky, Mono, Caretaker, Bad Religion, NOFX, Tool, U2, Nirvana, Smashing Pumpkins, the Smiths, the Cure, Ride, British indie rock and many of the Washington D.C. hardcore bands. Refused's The Shape of Punk to Come (1998) was as a major inspiration, with Hell is for Heroes making multiple attempts to have their albums produced by the album's producers Pelle Henricsson and Eskil Lövström.

Hell is for Heroes were one of the most prominent bands of Britain's 2000s wave of post-hardcore, alongside Biffy Clyro, Reuben and Hundred Reasons.

Sean Smith of the Blackout cited Hell is for Heroes as an influence upon his band and much of the Merthyr Tydfil music scene.

== Members ==
- Justin Schlosberg – vocals
- William McGonagle – guitar
- Tom O'Donoghue – guitar
- James Findlay – bass
- Joe Birch – drums

== Discography ==
=== Studio albums ===
| Year | Album details | Peak chart positions | | | | Certification |
| Year | Album details | UK | UK Rock | UK Indie | SCO | Certification |
|---|---|---|---|---|---|---|
| 2003 | The Neon Handshake: Released: 3 February 2003; Label: EMI; Formats: CD, digital download | 16 | 1 | - | 22 | |
| 2005 | Transmit Disrupt: Released: 21 March 2005; Label: Captains of Industry; Formats: CD, digital download | 89 | 3 | 9 | 78 | |
| 2007 | Hell Is For Heroes: Released: 11 June 2007; Label: Golf; Formats: CD, digital download | - | 27 | 17 | - | |

=== Singles ===
| Year | Title | Chart Positions | | | | Album |
| Year | Title | UK | UK Rock | UK Indie | SCO | Album |
|---|---|---|---|---|---|---|
| 2001 | "Sick/Happy/Cut Down" | – | – | – | – | The Neon Handshake |
| 2002 | "You Drove Me To It" | 63 | 4 | – | 71 | The Neon Handshake |
| 2002 | "I Can Climb Mountains" | 41 | 6 | – | 47 | The Neon Handshake |
| 2002 | "Night Vision" | 38 | 4 | – | 41 | The Neon Handshake |
| 2003 | "You Drove Me To It" (re-issue) | 28 | 3 | – | 34 | The Neon Handshake |
| 2003 | "Retreat" | 39 | 3 | – | 48 | The Neon Handshake |
| 2004 | "One of Us" | 71 | 5 | 16 | 79 | Transmit Disrupt |
| 2004 | "Kamichi" | 72 | – | 10 | 66 | Transmit Disrupt |
| 2004 | "Models for the Programme" | 54 | 3 | 8 | 64 | Transmit Disrupt |
| 2007 | "You've Got Hopes" | – | – | – | – | Hell Is For Heroes |
| 2022 | "I Should Never Have Been Here in the First Place" | – | – | – | – | |

=== DVDs ===
- Live at the Sheffield Leadmill (Dir: Oli Cole) (2004)
