= Transmit Disrupt =

Studio album by Hell Is for Heroes
- Released: March 2005
- Genre: Post-hardcore
- Length: 45:50
- Label: Independent (2005); Burning Heart (2006)
- Producer: Pelle Henricsson, Eskil Lövström and Hell Is For Heroes

Hell Is for Heroes chronology
The Neon Handshake (2003)	Transmit Disrupt (2005)	Hell Is for Heroes (2007)

Alternative Cover
- US Re-release Cover

Professional ratings
Review scores
Source	Rating
Allmusic	4.5/5 stars
Drowned in Sound	4/5 stars

Transmit Disrupt is the second album from Hell Is for Heroes and features 12 tracks. It was released in the United Kingdom in March 2005 while the band wasn't under a record label; consequently the album didn't get a lot of promotion. The singles "Kamichi", "One Of Us", "Discos and Casinos" and "Models for the Programme" were taken from the album. In March 2006 the album was re-released by Burning Heart Records with new artwork and packaging.

== Track listing ==
1. "Kamichi" – 3:55
2. "Models for the Programme" – 3:59
3. "Quiet Riot" – 4:46
4. "Folded Paper Figures" – 2:46
5. "---vVv---" – 1:06
6. "They Will Call Us Savages" – 4:10
7. "Silent as the Grave" – 4:30
8. "One of Us" – 2:48
9. "---wWw---" – 0:50
10. "Transmit Disrupt" – 5:58
11. "Discos and Casinos" – 3:30
12. "Burning Lafayette" – 7:33
