= Rubber Lover (Marmaduke Duke song) =

Single by Marmaduke Duke

from the album Duke Pandemonium
- Released: 17 April 2009
- Recorded: 2009
- Genre: Dance-pop, indie pop
- Length: 1:59
- Label: 14th Floor Records
- Songwriters: Simon Neil, JP Reid, Billy Joel

Marmaduke Duke singles chronology
"Kid Gloves" (2009)	"Rubber Lover" (2009)	"Silhouettes" (2009)

"Rubber Lover" is a song written by the Scottish experimental rock group Marmaduke Duke. It is included on their second album Duke Pandemonium (2009), and was released as a single on 17 April 2009. It charted at a peak position of #12 in the UK singles charts following considerable airplay on radio stations such as BBC Radio 1. The band have described the song as a "dirty pop-ode to a rubber doll".

The song features a sample from Billy Joel's song "Sleeping with the Television On".

== Music video ==
The video is set after the "Kid Gloves" video, in a room with many girls dancing in bikinis. The Duke is playing blackjack against a pig creature, with the Crow who emerged in the previous video watching while sitting next to the Duke. The pig reveals that he has two sixes with one card still face down. The Duke flips one of his two cards over to reveal a queen of hearts. The video then zooms into the heart enters a psychedelic phrase showing the relationship between the Duke and the Crow. It returns to the card game as two girls stand on the pigs side of the table, joined by two more who sit with the Duke. The pig flips over his last card to reveal another six, scoring 18 in the game. The Duke flips over his final card to reveal the Ace of Hearts, beating him. The video again zooms into the heart, entering another strange sequence focusing on the Crow. When it returns, the two girls steal the Duke's watchstop and slip away. The Duke finds the room to be empty, with a pig mask on the table. He overturns it angrily and finds that the man who had been wearing the mask has the Crow captive.

== Critical reception ==
Digital Spy's Nick Levine wrote that the song is "an early contender for most unlikely hit of the year" and went on to write, "it's compact, cheeky and perfectly formed". He also said "'Rubber Lover' has already become a bit of a radio favourite, mainly because it's very catchy indeed".

== Commercial performance ==
The song charted at #12 in the UK Singles Chart on its first week of release before falling to #17 the following week.

== Live performances ==
Marmaduke Duke performed the song in Radio 1's Live Lounge - Volume 4 on 23 April 2009.

== Charts ==
Chart performance for "Rubber Lover"
Chart (2009)	Peak position
Ireland (IRMA)	42
United Kingdom (OCC)	12
