= Dance of the Headless Bourgeoisie =

Studio album by Nomeansno
- Released: June 9, 1998
- Studio: Lemon Loaf
- Genre: Punk rock
- Length: 60:46 (original CD); 72:09 (double LP, CD and LP reissue)
- Labels: Alternative Tentacles, Wrong, Southern
- Producer: Nomeansno

Nomeansno chronology
The Worldhood of the World (As Such) (1995)	Dance of the Headless Bourgeoisie (1998)	One (2000)

Dance of the Headless Bourgeoisie is the eighth full-length album released by Canadian punk rock band Nomeansno. It was initially released on Alternative Tentacles in 1998 as a 10-track CD and 12-track double LP. The band's own label Wrong Records, along with distributors Southern Records, re-released the 12-track version of the album in 2007, 2010, and 2014 with modified track order and art.

Although Nomeansno's music was "always as indebted to avant-garde as to hardcore," Dance of the Headless Bourgeoisie is one of their most varied and experimental records. Critics generally received it well, although some were frustrated by the band's experimentation, and drummer John Wright later called the album "very obscure" and "not our greatest album."

== Background and recording ==
In 1993, Nomeansno became a four-piece, with guitarist Tom Holliston and second drummer Ken Kempster joining founding brothers John and Rob Wright. The band released The Worldhood of the World (As Such) in 1995, two years before Kempster departed due to the expenses of touring with two drummers.

Holliston and the Wright brothers began working on new Nomeansno material in 1997 after touring in support of their second record with their side project The Hanson Brothers. They amassed a set of diverse and often experimental tracks which comprised the new album. Writing for MusicOMH, critic Sam Shepherd later assessed the batch of songs as including "straightforward" punk (with influence from the Dead Kennedys and The Minutemen), sea shanty influences, forays in jazz experimentation, and moments recalling Krautrock. The album was recorded at Lemon Loaf Studios with engineer Marc L'Esperance, the first of three albums which Nomeansno would record at Lemon Loaf at least in part. Brian Else mixed the album at Greenhouse Studios.

== Release ==
Alternative Tentacles, the band's longtime label, released the album in 1998. Ten tracks were on the initial CD release, and twelve tracks on the initial LP release. The band toured extensively in support of the album over the next two years.

The band purchased their back catalogue from Alternative Tentacles in 2002 and began re-releasing their records through their own Wrong Records and distributors Southern Records. In 2007, 2010, and 2014, the band reissued new CD and double LP versions of the albums in Europe, Canada, and the United States. The new versions all included the original 12-song track listing in a slightly modified order, with the images placed on the back and front covers reversed relative to the original release.

== Reception ==
Professional ratings
Review scores
Source	Rating
Allmusic	3/5 stars
Louder Than War	7/10 stars
MusicOMH	4/5 stars
Rock Hard	9/10 stars

At the time of its release, the album received mixed reviews. A critic writing for The A.V. Club dismissed the album and argued that the band had "transformed from a tight, aggressive, smart, political punk band into a dull, meandering punk version of Rush."

Upon its re-releases, the album has been assessed more favorably. Writing for The Quietus, critic Sean Kitching praised the album's "incredible virtuosity" relative to the musical chemistry of the Wright brothers, whose "near-telepathic interplay" is "organic, honed-by-necessity (from their origins as a two-piece) and entirely in the service of their musical aesthetic." Similarly, Rock Hard author Marcus Schleutermann praised the album's diversity and awarded the album nine out of ten stars. Louder Than War critic Adrian Bloxham assessed the album as difficult but rewarding, and called Nomeansno Canada's greatest band.

== Track listing ==
All songs written by Nomeansno.

1. "This Story Must Be Told" – 5:40
2. "Going Nowhere" – 2:27
3. "I'm An Asshole" – 4:44
4. "Disappear" – 6:39
5. "Dance of the Headless Bourgeoisie" – 8:05
6. "The World Wasn't Built in a Day" – 9:36
7. "I Can't Stop Talking" – 5:29
8. "The Rape" – 5:57
9. "Give Me the Push" – 6:42
10. "One Fine Day" – 5:31
11. "Youth" – 6:54
12. "Life Like" – 4:25

Note: The above track listing matches that of the reissued versions released in 2007, 2010, and 2014 on Wrong Records and Southern Records. The original CD issue (1998, Alternative Tentacles) contained tracks 1 to 10 only. The original double LP version (1998, Alternative Tentacles) contained all tracks but ended with tracks 11, 12, and 10, in that order.

== Personnel ==
Nomeansno

- Tom Holliston – guitar, vocals
- John Wright – vocals, drums, keyboards
- Rob Wright – vocals, bass

Production and artwork

- Ø (Brian Else) – mixing
- Aaron Chapman – artwork
- Marc L'Esperance – engineering
- Randy Iwata – layout
