= Random Acts of Intimacy =

Studio album by Sucioperro
- Released: (United Kingdom) 12 June 2006
- Recorded: Mighty Atom Studios; Swansea, Wales
- Length: 36:54
- Label: Captains of Industry; CAPT032
- Producer: The Dragon, Joe Gibb, Gethin Woolcock, Sucioperro

Sucioperro chronology
Random Acts of Intimacy (2006)	Pain Agency (2008)

Singles from Random Acts of Intimacy
- 1. "Wolf Carnival" Released: 10 April 2006; 2. "Dialog On The 2" Released: 15 May 2006; 3. "The Drop" Released: 10 October 2006; 4. "Grace And Out Of Me" Released: 2007

Professional ratings
Review scores
Source	Rating
Drowned In Sound	(8/10)
Kerrang!	4/5 stars

Random Acts of Intimacy is the debut album by Scottish rock band, Sucioperro, released on 12 June 2006 by Captains of Industry.

== Overview ==
"The Crushing Of The Little People" was featured on the "Kerrang! New Breed" double album compilation.

Three singles were released from the album - free 'taster' download "Wolf Carnival"; "Dialog On The 2" and "The Drop" were released on CD and were accompanied by two b-sides each. "Grace & Out Of Me" was later released as a free download to coincide with the band's tour with Surrey rockers Reuben - with the accompanying music video directed by Reuben's Jamie Lenman.

The artwork was the first collaboration between Stewart Chown (who would later go on to become the band's bassist) and Glasgow-based photographer Gordon Burniston.

== Track listing ==
- All words and music by Reid, except "Dialog on the 2", words by Reid/Logg.

No.	Title	Length
1.	"The Crushing of the Little People"	2:59
2.	"Wolf Carnival"	3:03
3.	"Grace and Out of Me"	3:27
4.	"Random Acts of Intimacy"	3:17
5.	"Dialog on the 2"	2:34
6.	"I Don't Hate It, I Accept It"	3:35
7.	"Tem V Com"	3:08
8.	"Apathy=Inaction"	2:39
9.	"List of What Needs Said"	4:10
10.	"The Drop"	3:37
11.	"The Final Confessions of Mabel Stark"	4:25

Bonus tracks on Deluxe Digital Reissue (2010)
No.	Title	Length
12.	"Dead Leaf Echo"	2:45
13.	"The Altruist"	4:18
14.	"Conversations With A Wasp"	2:41
15.	"The Ruins"	3:22

== B-sides ==
- Conversation With A Wasp
- The Altruist
- Dead Leaf Echo
- The Ruins

== Videos ==
- Dialog On The 2 - Shot by David Rossi, edited by Ian White
- Grace And Out Of Me - Directed by Jamie Lenman

Note: These videos were uploaded to YouTube by Sucioperro.
