= One (Nomeansno album) =

Studio album by Nomeansno
- Released: September 19, 2000
- Recorded: 2000
- Genre: Punk rock
- Length: 63:07
- Label: Alternative Tentacles
- Producer: Nomeansno

Nomeansno chronology
Dance of the Headless Bourgeoisie (1998)	One (2000)	All Roads Lead to Ausfahrt (2006)

One is the ninth full-length album by Vancouver punk rock band Nomeansno. Released in 2000, it was their penultimate album and last of eight albums issued through the Alternative Tentacles imprint. Its long, ponderous songs generally pleased critics and longtime fans, with All Music critic Tom Schulte assessing the album's "intense and heavy collegiate punk" as one of the band's finest efforts since their seminal 1989 album Wrong. It features a cover of the Ramones song "Beat on the Brat" and a reworking of the title track of Miles Davis's Bitches Brew album. Because of the ambiguity of the album cover layout, the album has been understood at times by the press to be called No One.

== Background and recording ==
Nomeansno, formed in 1979, celebrated their twentieth anniversary while touring in support of their 1998 album Dance of the Headless Bourgeoisie. After the tour, they began to assemble material for a new record. The resulting batch of long and ponderous songs was originally intended for a release by Mr. Right and Mr. Wrong, the side project of Nomeansno brothers Rob and John Wright; but the Wrights ultimately decided to release the material as a Nomeansno album. John Wright later stated that the band's desire to create a unified statement after the diverse and experimental Dance of the Headless Bourgeoisie influenced the songwriting direction and the band's conscious decision to write heavy and expansive songs.

As with Dance of the Headless Bourgeoisie, the band recorded the album at Lemon Loaf Studios in Vancouver with Marc L'Esperance. Three outtakes from the recording session were issued as the Generic Shame EP the following year. John Wright later ranked One among his favorites from the band's catalog.

== Reception ==
Professional ratings
Review scores
Source	Rating
Allmusic	3/5 stars
Alltime Records	9/10 stars
PopMatters	(Favorable)

The album received favorable reviews, many emphasizing the impressiveness of the band's accomplishment at an advanced age. Alltime Records reviewer Guy Peters argued that "[n]ever has a Nomeansno album sounded better than this time around, and never before has the band's interplay reached such heights." Peters awarded the album nine out of ten stars. Similarly, PopMatters critic Devin Robinson ranked the release among the most impressive of the era, calling it "instantly more important and vital, more daring, than anything on the Warped Tour." While AllMusic's Tom Schulte held that the album did not quite reach their previous heights, he argued that it came close and was praiseworthy nonetheless.

== Track listing ==
All songs written by Nomeansno unless noted otherwise.

1. "The Graveyard Shift" – 6:00
2. "Under the Sea" – 6:13
3. "Our Town" – 8:02
4. "A Little Too High" – 8:48
5. "Hello/Goodbye" – 6:20
6. "The Phone Call" – 8:40
7. "Bitch's Brew" (Miles Davis) – 15:03
8. "Beat on the Brat" (Joey Ramone) – 3:57

== Personnel ==
Nomeansno

- Tom Holliston – guitar, vocals
- John Wright – vocals, drums, keyboards
- Rob Wright – vocals, bass

Additional musicians

- Mark Critchley – electric piano (track 7)
- David Macanulty – congas (track 7)

Production

- Marc L'Esperance – mixing, mastering
