= Captains of Industry (record label) =

UK independent record label

- Defunct: 2008-04-01
- Fate: "ceased trading"
- Headquarters: Durham, England

The Captains of Industry were an independent record label based in London and Durham, UK. They announced their launch in 2003 "as a self-funded experiment in art and commerce" with a plan to exist for 5 years, and as a result ceased trading while in profit in 2008.

They released material by artists including Hell Is for Heroes, The Grates, Peace Burial at Sea, Gay for Johnny Depp, The SoundEx, Marmaduke Duke, Kinesis, TEAM and Sucioperro. Captains of Industry 'ceased trading' as of 1 April 2008, claiming to have achieved their '5 year plan' – to "release some cool records".

The label released Transmit Disrupt, the second album by Hell Is for Heroes, after the band was dropped by EMI, and is co-managed by the band's vocalist Justin Schlosberg.
