= Sucioperro =

Scottish rock band

- Origin: Ayr, South Ayrshire, Scotland
- Genres: Alternative rock, post-hardcore
- Years active: 2002–present
- Labels: Captains of Industry (2006–2008); Maybe Records (2008–2010; Xtra Mile Recordings (2011–present)
- Members: JP Reid; Fergus Munro; Roberto Cañas; Stewart Chown
- Past members: Michael Logg; David Aird; Brendan Reilly; Dave Martin
- Website: sucioperro.com

Sucioperro (Spanish for 'Filthy Dog'; pronounced [ˌsuθjoˈpero]) are a Scottish alternative rock band from Ayr, South Ayrshire, formed in 2002.

== History ==
=== Random Acts of Intimacy ===
The band's debut album, Random Acts of Intimacy, was released in June 2006 on the Captains of Industry record label. It features the download only single "Wolf Carnival" as well as the singles "Dialog on the 2", "The Drop" and download only "Grace And Out of Me" which includes the video for the song directed by Jamie Lenman of Reuben.

=== Pain Agency ===
The band's second album is called Pain Agency, which was released on 4 May 2009, through Maybe Records. It was produced by the band and recorded in their own studio in Ayr, South Ayrshire and was mixed by Chris Sheldon.

Mums' Bad Punk Music was released as a single on 17 November 2008 through Maybe Records. It features three non-album tracks and was released on limited edition CD and digital download.

The second single from the album was "Don't Change (What You Can't Understand)" and was released in mid-April 2009 as a digital download via Maybe Records. The package included a brace of newly recorded b-sides.

In October 2009, the band released the third single from Pain Agency in the form of "The Dissident Code". This is the last material to be released from the album.

=== The Heart String & How to Pull It ===
Sucioperro's third record, The Heart String & How to Pull It, was released on 7 March 2011 through Xtra Mile Recordings. It has spawned two singles so far 'Threads' and 'Reflexes of the Dead' both of which were trialled throughout previous UK shows prior to the release of the album.

=== Fused ===
Sucioperro recorded a fourth album in early 2012, Fused, which released in the late summer. Pre-orders were made available on their Bandcamp page, and a video released to accompany the first song previewing the album, A River of Blood. This was the first music video to be taken from the album. It was after the album's release that the other music videos were published. "To Nothing" released on 29 August 2012. "Rabbits..." was the third, published on 17 October 2012, which was then followed by "... Boxes" on the 18th. A combination of the two songs made the fifth track of the album, Rabbits in Boxes.

=== Reunion ===
Sucioperro announced they would be reuniting to play live for the first time in 14 years to celebrate 20 years of their debut album. There is to be a single show on November 12th 2026, Originally planned for Glasgow’s King Tuts, it was relocated to SWG3 after selling out.

== Band members ==
=== Current members ===
- JP Reid – vocals, guitar
- Fergus Munro – drums, vocals
- Stewart Chown – bass, vocals

=== Past members ===
- Michael Logg – bass (2002–2008)
- David Aird – guitar (2004–2007)
- Brendan Reilly – drums (2002–2004)
- Dave Martin – guitar (2002–2003)

=== Additional live members ===
- Gordon Love (2011–?)
- Hooligan Sadikson (2011–?)

== Discography ==
=== Albums ===
- Random Acts of Intimacy (10 June 2006, Captains of Industry)
- Pain Agency (4 May 2009, Maybe Records)
- The Heart String & How to Pull It (7 March 2011, Xtra Mile Recordings)
- Fused (8 August 2012)

=== EPs ===
- Why Bliss Destroy (August 2002, self-released)
- The Hidden Perils Of Dancing (11 November 2004, Adorno Records)
- Tour EP #1 (April 2005, self-released)
- Mums' Bad Punk Music (17 November 2008, Maybe Records)
- The Dissident Code (19 October 2009, Maybe Records)
- Chemicals EP (7 March 2011, self-released, Pledgemusic download)

=== Singles ===
- "Wolf Carnival" (10 April 2006, Captains of Industry, download only)
- "Dialog on the 2" (15 May 2006, Captains of Industry)
- "The Drop" (10 October 2006, Captains of Industry)
- "Don't Change (What You Can't Understand)" (27 April 2009, Maybe Records, download only)
- "I'm Not in Charge" (14 December 2009, King Tuts Recordings)
- "Threads" (6 December 2010, self-released, download only)
- "Reflexes of the Dead" (28 February 2011, Xtra Mile Recordings, download only)
