= D.O.A. discography =

This is the discography for Canadian punk rock band D.O.A.

== Studio albums ==
- Something Better Change (1980)
- Hardcore '81 (1981)
- Let's Wreck The Party (1985)
- True (North) Strong And Free (1987)
- Last Scream of the Missing Neighbors (With Jello Biafra) (1989)
- Murder (1990)
- 13 Flavours of Doom (1992)
- Loggerheads (1993)
- The Black Spot (1995)
- Festival Of Atheists (1998)
- Win the Battle (2002)
- Live Free Or Die (2004)
- Northern Avenger (2008)
- Kings of Punk, Hockey and Beer (2009)
- Talk-Action=0 (2010)
- We Come In Peace (2012)
- Hard Rain Falling (2015)
- Fight Back (2018)
- Treason (2020)

== EPs ==
- War on 45 (1982)

== Compilation albums ==
- Bloodied But Unbowed (1984) UK Indie #14
- The Dawning of a New Error (1985)
- Greatest Shits (1991)
- Moose Droppings (1993)
- The Lost Tapes (1998)
- War and Peace (2003)
- Greatest Shits (2005)
- Punk Rock Singles 1977-1999 (2007)
- 1978 (2019)

== Live albums ==
- Triumph of the Ignoroids Friends Records (Bootleg) (1981)
- Talk Minus Action Equals Zero (1991)
- The Vagabond Sessions split 12" with Potbelly. (2010)
- Welcome to Chinatown (2013)

== Singles, 7"s, EPs ==
- Disco Sucks (4-song 7 inch EP on Sudden Death)
- The Prisoner/Thirteen (7-inch on Quintessence)
- Disco Sucks (re-released on Quintessence)
- World War Three/Whatcha Gonna Do (7-inch on Quintessence; Ltd edition on Sudden Death)
- Triumph Of The Ignoroids (4-sing 12-inch EP on Friends Records)
- White Noise Tour (bootleg) (1980)
- Positively D.O.A. (7-inch EP on Alternative Tentacles) UK Indie #37
- Right To Be Wild (7-inch single feat. Fuck You b/w Burn It Down)
- General Strike/That's Life (7-inch single)
- Don't Turn Yer Back... (Peel Session) (4-song 12-inch EP on Alternative Tentacles) UK Indie #38
- Expo Hurts Everyone (7-inch EP with 3 other bands)
- It's Not Unusual (7-inch EP on Alternative Tentacles)
- The Only Thing Green
- Ken Jensen Memorial Single (7-inch EP on Alternative Tentacles)
- Sex, Drugs and Rock & Roll
- Split w/ d.b.s.
- Nervous Breakdown (Split with Dog Eat Dogma)
- Beat 'Em, Bust 'Em
- Just Play It Over And Over
- Are U Ready (Split with Thor)
- We Occupy (ft. Jello Biafra)
- Fucked Up Donald

Music videos

- World War III
- War
- Dance O' Death
- Takin' Care Of Business
- Behind The Smile
- We Know What You Want
- Where Evil Grows
- Death Machine
- Hole In The Sky
- I See Your Cross
- Order
- World Falls Apart
- Driving To Hell And Back
- Mexican Holiday
- Police Brutality
- Human Bomb
- I Live In A Car
- That's Why I'm an Atheist

== Videos ==
- Best of Flipside
- Live at the Assassination Club (1984)
- Warrior (1986)
- The End
- Greatest Shits Video
- Smash The State (2007)
- American Hardcore (film) soundtrack song Fucked Up Ronnie

== Compilations ==
- Vancouver Complication
- Let Them Eat Jellybeans!
- Rat Music For Rat People
- Something To Believe In
- Terminal City Ricochet soundtrack
- More Than A State Of Mind
- Last Call
- Short Music For Short People
- Return of the Read Menace
- You Call This Music?! Volume 1
- International P.E.A.C.E. Benefit Compilation
- Smells Like Bleach: A Punk Tribute to Nirvana
- Rock Against Bush, Vol. 1
- Canucks Punk Rock
- Guest vocal on "more drugs, more cops, more prisons" from Canadian Prog Punk band Removal
- Shut the fuck up and listen vol. 2. 7".PB Records/P.I.G. Records

== Books ==
- I, Shithead: A Life in Punk (Arsenal Pulp Press) link
- Talk-Action=0: An Illustrated History of D.O.A. (Arsenal Pulp Press) link
