= Vancouver Complication =

Compilation album

Compilation album by various artists
- Released: 1979
- Recorded: 1976–1978
- Genre: Punk rock
- Label: Pinned Records; Sudden Death Records (CD Re-Release)

Professional ratings
Review scores
Source	Rating
Ned Raggett, AllMusic	4.5/5 stars
Brian Lynch, Georgia Straight	link

Vancouver Complication is a compilation album featuring many influential Vancouver punk bands. It was released in 1979 on Pinned Records, and has been reissued a number of times with several different cover designs.

Considered one of the most important Canadian punk rock albums, the album was compiled by Grant McDonagh, who would later become one of the founders of Zulu Records. Most tracks were recorded at the Sabre Sound studio in Vancouver; for some bands, their contributions to the album were their first and/or only time recording material in a studio.

== Reissue ==
The album was reissued in compact disc format in 2005, on Joe Keithley's Sudden Death Records. The CD reissue's liner notes acknowledged that the 1978 Akron, Ohio punk compilation The Akron Compilation was one of McDonagh's key inspirations for compiling and releasing the album.

The CD reissue was marked by a release party at Vancouver's Wise Hall, featuring performances by many of the bands on the compilation. In 2011, Sudden Death Records announced a special project, donating all proceeds from sales of the album during the Christmas retail season to the Vancouver Food Bank.

== Critical response ==
Writing for Exclaim!, Sam Sutherland stated that "a better snapshot of the beginnings of Canada's fertile West Coast punk scene does not exist." For AllMusic, Ned Raggett noted that some of the bands on the compilation sounded derivative of the more established punk rock scenes in London and New York City, but praised other bands with "other less straitjacketed ways around punk inspirations" for producing "lasting winners", and called the overall album "a classic late-'70s punk-era city-scene survey".

== Track listing ==
1. "The Marching Song" - Pointed Sticks
2. "Big Shot" - Exxotone
3. "Kill, Kill, This Is Pop" - D.O.A.
4. "Fun While It Lasts" - Active Dog
5. "Wirehead" - Wasted Lives
6. "Death to the Sickoids" - Subhumans
7. "U-J3RK5 Work for Police" - U-J3RK5
8. "Rock and Roll Radio" - Private School
9. "Mindless Aggression" - No Fun
10. "I Don't Love You" - The Dishrags
11. "Pork You" - Biz
12. "Sideways" - Exxotone
13. "I Hate Music" - The K-Tels
14. "Nothing Holding You" - Active Dog
15. "Urban Guerilla" - Subhumans
16. "New Clientèle" - The Shades
17. "Quarter to Eight" - Tim Ray and AV
18. "Naum Gabo" - U-J3RK5
19. "I Hate You" - D.O.A.
20. "Old" - No Fun
21. "[e?]925" - [e?]

The 2005 CD reissue included five bonus tracks, taken from the original recording sessions but not included on the original 1979 album:

1. "Dying In Brooklyn" - Tim Ray & The Druts
2. "Bullshit" - The Dishrags
3. "Tits on the Beach" - Rude Norton
4. "Sea Cruise" - Rude Norton
5. "Gilligan's Island" - Rude Norton
