= Bloodied but Unbowed =

Canadian documentary film about punk rock

Bloodied but Unbowed is a 2010 Canadian documentary film detailing the rise and influence of the punk music scene in Vancouver, British Columbia, Canada.

== History ==
Bloodied but Unbowed was produced and directed by independent filmmaker Susanne Tabata. Between 2007 and 2010, Tabata combined archival film footage, audio recordings and photographs from the 1970s and early 1980s with interviews of people who had been involved with the Vancouver punk scene. Bands featured included D.O.A., Pointed Sticks, Young Canadians, the Modernettes, the Braineaters, The Dishrags, and the Subhumans, as well as Rabid, U-J3RK5, and Active Dog.

The 75 minute film premiered at the 2011 DOXA Documentary Film Festival in Vancouver, and was screened at various other film festivals in the US and Canada. The film has been shown on television and in 2012 it was released on DVD.
