= War on 45 =

War on 45 (2005 CD Version)

EP 12" / CD by D.O.A.
- Released: 1982
- Genre: Hardcore punk
- Label: Alternative Tentacles, Sudden Death

D.O.A. chronology
Hardcore '81 (1981)	War on 45 (2005 CD Version) (1982)	Bloodied But Unbowed (1984)

Alternative cover
- Original 1982 EP cover

War on 45 is an eight-song 12" EP released by the hardcore band D.O.A. in 1982. It was re-released in 2005 on CD with an additional eleven songs, but without the composition "Let's Fuck," for a total of eighteen tracks. The original cover has "MARCH INTO THE 80'S" written on it, while the 2005 version reads "MARCH TO THE END."

Professional ratings
Review scores
Source	Rating
AllMusic	4.5/5 stars
Robert Christgau	A−

== Track listing ==
All songs written by Joey Shithead, except where noted.

Original 1982 EP

1. "Liar for Hire"
2. "I'm Right, You're Wrong"
3. "America the Beautiful"
4. "Let's Fuck" (remake of the Chris Montez song "Let's Dance", covered on the first Ramones LP)
5. "War" (cover of the Temptations song)
6. "I Hate You"
7. "War in the East"
8. "Class War" (Dils cover)

2005 CD Re-release

1. "Liar For Hire"
2. "I'm Right, You're Wrong"
3. "America the Beautiful"
4. "War" (The Temptations cover)
5. "I Hate You"
6. "War in the East"
7. "Class War" (Kinman)
8. "World War 3" (Shithead, Chuck Biscuits)
9. "Smash the State"
10. "Masters of War" (Bob Dylan cover)
11. "Earache"
12. "Eve of Destruction" (P. F. Sloan cover)
13. "We Don't Need No God Damn War"
14. "Warmonger"
15. "Bombs Away" (Goble)
16. "World Falls Apart"
17. "Fortunate Son" (Creedence Clearwater Revival cover)
18. "No God No War"

== Personnel ==
- Joey "Shithead" Keithley – singer, guitarist
- Dave Gregg – guitarist
- Ken "Dimwit" Montgomery – drums
- Brian "Wimpy Roy" Goble – bass
