= Let's Wreck the Party =

Studio album by D.O.A.
- Released: 1985
- Genre: Punk rock, hard rock
- Label: Alternative Tentacles
- Producer: Brian MacLeod

D.O.A. chronology
Bloodied but Unbowed (1984)	Let's Wreck the Party (1985)	True (North) Strong and Free (1986)

Let's Wreck the Party is an album by the Canadian band D.O.A., released in 1985. It was first released by Alternative Tentacles, in the United States, in order to beat to market a demo tape that had been obtained by another label. The band supported the album with a North American tour. Frontman Joe Keithley rerecorded "Dangerman" for his 2007 album, Band of Rebels. Let's Wreck the Party was reissued in 2010.

== Production ==
The album was produced by Brian MacLeod. D.O.A. chose to incorporate elements of hard rock in order to broaden their sound and reach a larger audience; they also thought that hardcore punk had lost its political purpose and was no longer attracting new listeners. Keithley was open to changing the band's sound but not the content of its lyrics. He considered D.O.A. to be "satirical, spiritual altruists", not scolds or evangelists. The title track refers to both party crashing and disrupting the conservatism of the 1980s; it has also been interpreted as mocking straight edge. "Singin' in the Rain" is a cover of the popular standard. "Dance o' Death" was inspired by a revival meeting attended by Keithley. "Race Riot" and "General Strike" appeared on the band's John Peel EP Don't Turn Yer Back, which was recorded in support of miners fighting for better wages and working conditions. "Murder in Hollywood" relates the factual story of a Christian sect murder that occurred in the band's Los Angeles apartment building. "Our World" urges listeners to effect change by starting with their local communities. "Trial by Media" is dedicated to Gerry Hannah, a member of Subhumans who was convicted of crimes related to anarchist activities.

== Critical reception ==
Professional ratings
Review scores
Source	Rating
AllMusic	2.5/5 stars
Alternative Rock	7/10
Robert Christgau	B−
The Encyclopedia of Popular Music	4/5 stars
The Great Indie Discography	7/10

The Morning Call concluded that "D.O.A. is trying to accomplish what has been tried but never quite achieved: a workable, commercial synthesis of punk's rhythms and social consciousness and hard rock's popular stylings." The Oregonian said that "several of the tunes feature chord changes indistinguishable from common heavy metal." Robert Christgau noted "the slightly Britified metal-mania so many professional punks drift into". The Palm Beach Post praised the "sharp insights ... disguised as get-down, party music." Maximum Rocknroll admired the "much more powerful sound".

AllMusic opined that "it's real good in places, though your tolerance for AOR radio rock, even the good kind, might be limited". The Trouser Press Record Guide called Let's Wreck the Party "a cutting and witty record". The Encyclopedia of Popular Music labeled it "a definitive, hard-rocking, intelligent punk record."

== Track listing ==
No.	Title	Length
1.	"Our World"
2.	"Dangerman"
3.	"Race Riot"
4.	"Singin' in the Rain"
5.	"Dance o' Death"
6.	"General Strike"
7.	"Let's Wreck the Party"
8.	"Shout Out"
9.	"Murder in Hollywood"
10.	"The Warrior Ain't No More"
11.	"No Way Out"
12.	"Trial by Media"
