= Something Better Change =

Studio album by D.O.A.
- Released: 1980
- Recorded: 1977–1980
- Genre: Punk rock, hardcore punk
- Length: Original release: 39:07; Re-release: 59:08
- Label: Can. Friends; Sudden Death; Alternative Tentacles
- Producer: Richard Drake

D.O.A. chronology
Something Better Change (1980)	Hardcore '81 (1981)

Professional ratings
Review scores
Source	Rating
Allmusic	4.5/5 stars
Exclaim!	(?)

Something Better Change is the debut album by Canadian punk rock band D.O.A. The album was recorded between 1977 and 1980 in Vancouver, British Columbia, Canada and was released in 1980 on the label Can. Friends. (See 1980 in music).

For nearly two decades since Something Better Change and the follow-up album Hardcore '81 went out of print, the albums were compiled into the compilation Bloodied But Unbowed, and then, to address the numerous songs removed in the process, the Polish import greatest hits album Greatest Shits was released. Music critic Jack Rabid stated that "when one considers how revolutionary and yet how distinct from each other those two LPs were, this state of affairs just made no sense.".

In 2000, the album was re-issued on lead singer Joey Shithead's own label Sudden Death records for a native Canada release. In 2002 it was re-released on Dead Kennedys former front-man Jello Biafra's Alternative Tentacles music label. The re-issue included a single bonus track, a re-recording off their first EP originally titled "Disco Sucks", but now titled "New Wave Sucks". In May 2011, a remastered version of the album was released by Sudden Death Records on CD and vinyl LP. In 2013, the album was listed at number 10 in Ballast's list of top 50 Canadian albums of all time.

== Track listing ==
All tracks are written by Joey Shithead, except where noted.

No.	Title	Writer(s)	Length
1.	"New Age"	David Gregg, Joey Shithead	2:18
2.	"The Enemy"	Chuck Biscuits, Shithead	2:53
3.	"2 + 2"	Biscuits, Shithead	4:08
4.	"Get Out of My Life"	Brian Roy Goble, Shithead, Ken Montgomery, Simon Werner	2:07
5.	"Woke up Screaming"		2:42
6.	"Last Night"	Biscuits	3:23
7.	"Thirteen"		2:23
8.	"Great White Hope"	Biscuits	2:53
9.	"The Prisoner"		2:01
10.	"Rich Bitch"		3:00
11.	"Take a Chance"		1:48
12.	"Watcha Gonna Do?"		4:44
13.	"World War 3"	Biscuits, Shithead	3:46
14.	"New Wave Sucks"		1:01

== Personnel ==
=== The band ===
- Chuck Biscuits – Drums
- David Gregg – Guitar, Keyboards
- Randy Rampage – Bass
- Joey Shithead – Guitar, Vocals

=== Additional musicians ===
- Simon Wilde – Bass (on tracks 5, 9, 10, and 13)

=== Technical staff ===
- Richard Drake – producer, engineer
- Ron Obvious – engineer (on track 12)
