= If Life Were a Result, We'd All Be Dead =

Studio album by d.b.s.
- Released: February 2000
- Recorded: 1997
- Genres: Punk rock Post-hardcore
- Length: 28:12
- Label: Crap Records

D.b.s. chronology
Some Boys Got It, Most Men Don't (1999)	If Life Were a Result, We'd All Be Dead (2000)	Forget Everything You Know (EP) (2001)

Professional ratings
Review scores
Source	Rating
Discorder	(ambivalent)
Exclaim!	(ambivalent)

If Life Were a Result, We'd All Be Dead is the fifth and final full-length album released by the North Vancouver punk band d.b.s. It was released by Crap Records in February 2000. Although their final full-length, the songs on this album were actually recorded in 1997, before their previous album. The songs were intended to be released on various singles, but this plan never came to fruition.

The band's music on this album has been likened to Lifetime and Jawbreaker, marking an "awkward transition" from the political lyrics of I Is for Insignificant to the more personal lyrics of Some Boys Got It, Most Men Don't.

== Track listing ==
1. "Will You Accept the Charges?" – 3:21
2. "Galleon's Lap" – 2:51
3. "The Ethics of Camping" – 2:42
4. "Tsawwassen" – 2:25
5. "Scavenger Hunt" – 3:49
6. "Immovable Stones" – 2:26
7. "The Night She Left" – 3:53
8. "Mayday" – 3:09
9. "Dogma Schmogma" – 3:41

== Personnel ==
- Andy Dixon – guitar, backing vocals
- Jesse Gander – vocals
- Paul Patko – drums, backing vocals
- Dhani Borges – bass guitar
