= Talk-Action=0 =

Talk - Action = 0

Studio album by D.O.A.
- Released: 2010
- Genre: Punk rock, hardcore punk
- Length: 46:16
- Label: Can. Friends; Sudden Death
- Producer: Joe Keithley and Chon

D.O.A. chronology
Kings of Punk, Hockey and Beer (2009)	Talk - Action = 0 (2010)	We Come in Peace (2012)

Professional ratings
Review scores
Source	Rating
AllMusic	4/5 stars

Talk - Action = 0 is the 17th studio album by Canadian punk rock band D.O.A. It was released on June 8, 2010. The title had already appeared as the slogan on the back of their 2002 album Win The Battle. All songs are written by Joe Keithley except where noted.

== Track listing ==
1. That's Why I Am an Atheist
2. Rebel Kind
3. They Hate Punk Rock
4. I Live in a Car
5. The R.C.M.P.
6. Don't Bank on a Bank
7. Tyrants Turn in Hell
8. The Times They Are A-Changin' (Bob Dylan)
9. Captain Kirk, Spock, Scotty and Bones
10. Don't Let Your Life
11. That's Amore (Harry Warren/Jack Brooks)
12. Lookin' for a World

== Personnel ==
=== The band ===
- Floor Tom Jones – drums
- Dirty Dan Sedan – Bass
- Joey Shithead - guitar, vocals

=== Additional musicians ===
- Ford Pier – Special guest Singer
