= 13 Flavours of Doom =

13 Flavours Of Doom

Studio album by D.O.A.
- Released: 1992
- Recorded: Profile, Vancouver, British Columbia, Canada
- Genre: Hardcore punk
- Length: 43:07
- Labels: Sudden Death; Alternative Tentacles (UK)
- Producer: John Wright

D.O.A. chronology
Greatest Shits (1992)	13 Flavours Of Doom (1992)	Loggerheads (1993)

Professional ratings
Review scores
Source	Rating
AllMusic	2.5/5 stars

13 Flavours Of Doom is the sixth album by Canadian hardcore punk band D.O.A. It was released in 1992 on band member Joe Keithley's own record label, Sudden Death Records, and also in the UK on Alternative Tentacles. In spite of its title, the album actually had fourteen tracks – the last one not being numbered on the CD inlay.

== Track listing ==
All tracks are written by Joe Keithley, except where noted.

No.	Title	Length
1.	"Already Dead"	2:15
2.	"Death Machine"	2:22
3.	"Bombs Away" (Brian Roy Goble)	4:04
4.	"The Living Dead" (Goble)	2:44
5.	"Played the Fool"	2:15
6.	"Too Fuckin' Heavy"	2:46
7.	"Hole in the Sky"	3:59
8.	"Hey Sister"	3:25
9.	"Use Your Raincoat"	3:14
10.	"Legalized Theft" (Goble)	2:19
11.	"Rosemary's Baby" (Goble)	4:15
12.	"Beatin' Rock 'n' Roll to Death"	2:37
13.	"Time of Illusion" (Goble)	3:28
14.	"Phantom Zone"

== Credits ==
- Joe "Joey Shithead" Keithley – guitar, vocals
- Brian Roy Goble – bass, vocals
- Ken Jensen – drums, vocals
- John Wright – keyboards, vocals
- Recorded at Profile Studios, Vancouver, British Columbia, Canada
- Produced by John Wright
- Engineered by Brian Else
