= Quintessence Records (Canadian label) =

- Founded: 1978
- Defunct: 1981
- Status: Defunct
- Genre: Punk rock
- Country of origin: Canada

For the label of the same name, formed by Pickwick International, see Quintessence Records

Quintessence Records was a Canadian independent record label, notable for releasing a number of records by punk rock bands in the Vancouver area between 1978 and 1981.

== History ==
Quintessence Records was an independent record label that evolved from a Vancouver independent retail record store of the same name, located in the Kitsilano neighbourhood. The store was the only local record store selling punk and new wave music at the time. The record label were started by store owner Ted Thomas in 1978, at the instigation of store employee Gerry Barad Barad during this time also became a well-known concert promoter of local punk bands. He later became the chief operating officer of Live Nation Entertainment.

The label was primarily known for releasing music by Vancouver punk bands, most notably music by the Subhumans, D.O.A., Pointed Sticks and early recordings by Art Bergmann. The first EP released by Quintessence Records, was Hawaii, by the Young Canadians. The band, which featured Art Bergmann, had previously been known as the K-Tels, prior to being served with a cease and desist order by K-tel Corporation. The label also was involved in releasing the early recordings of Canadian country rock band Blue Northern.

Both the record label and related record store ceased operations in 1981. The record store lease was taken over by former Quintessence Records employee Grant McDonagh, who continued in the tradition of Quintessence Records as Zulu Records, operating both a record store and an independent record label.

== Discography ==
D.O.A. - The Prisoner (1978)
AV - AV EP (1978)
Pointed Sticks - What Do You Want Me To Do (1978)
The K-Tels - Automan (1979)
Young Canadians - Hawaii (1979)
Subhumans - S/T (1979)
D.O.A. - Disco Sucks (1979)
The Pointed Sticks - The Real Thing (1979)
The Pointed Sticks - Lies! (1979)
Female Hands - S/T (1980)
Modernettes - Teen City (1980)
Young Canadians - This Is Your Life (1980)
Blue Northern - Blue (1980)
UJ3RK5 - S/T (1980)
Pointed Sticks - Perfect Youth (1980)
Subhumans - Firing Squad (1980)
Cover Boys - It's A New World/She's A Jerk (1980)
