= Some Boys Got It, Most Men Don't =

Studio album by d.b.s.
- Released: June 1999
- Genres: Punk rock Post-hardcore
- Length: 39:22
- Label: New Disorder Records

D.b.s. chronology
I Is for Insignificant (1998)	Some Boys Got It, Most Men Don't (1999)	If Life Were a Result, We'd All Be Dead (2000)

Professional ratings
Review scores
Source	Rating
Exclaim!	(favorable)
Punknews.org	4.5/5 stars

Some Boys Got It, Most Men Don't is the fourth album released by the North Vancouver punk band d.b.s. It was released by New Disorder Records in June 1999. This is the first d.b.s. recording to feature new bassist Ryan Angus, who replaced Dhani Borges.

The album marks a turning point in the band's development, and had some post-hardcore influence. Tracks such as "...And Then I Awoke" and "Past Friendships" included acoustic guitar; these tracks have been likened to the sound of The Promise Ring and Jawbreaker, respectively. The album also received comparisons to some emo hardcore bands on Jade Tree Records, such as Lifetime and Kid Dynamite, as well as Converge. For the final five minutes of "A Foundation for Positive Change", there is heavy feedback, a piano playing a repeated theme, and fuzzy sampled voice clips—resulting in a more experimental sound than the band's earlier recordings, and presaging the sampled music that band member Andy Dixon would later compose.

== Track listing ==
1. "Set Your Clock Back an Hour" – 1:34
2. "Your Apathy Is Killing Both of Us" – 3:10
3. "Starboard" – 3:54
4. "Dear Diary" – 0:29
5. "The Sun Went All the Way Down" – 2:59
6. "...And Then I Awoke" – 3:55
7. "Aspirations" – 2:15
8. "My Life as a Book (Chapter Two)" – 3:24
9. "Apology" – 2:54
10. "Kitchen Noise" – 4:04
11. "Past Friendships" – 4:56
12. "A Foundation for Positive Change" – 5:54

== Personnel ==
- Andy Dixon – guitar, backing vocals
- Jesse Gander – vocals
- Paul Patko – drums, backing vocals
- Ryan "Nordburg" Angus – bass guitar
