= If the Music's Loud Enough... =

If the Music's Loud Enough…

Studio album by d.b.s.
- Released: 1996
- Genre: Punk rock
- Length: 34:05
- Label: Nefer Records

D.b.s. chronology
Tales from the Crib (1995)	If the Music's Loud Enough… (1996)	I Is for Insignificant (1998)

If the Music's Loud Enough... is the second studio album released by the North Vancouver punk band d.b.s. It was released by Nefer Records in 1996. In the week of 16 January to 23 January 1997, the album appeared at #24 on the Canadian Top 50 music chart.

== Track listing ==
1. "No Room" – 2:03
2. "P.E." – 1:17
3. "I Wanna Go Home" – 2:16
4. "The Truce" – 1:41
5. "The Scottish Drinkin' Song" – 2:09
6. "Friend" – 2:58
7. "Uh… Hi" – 0:53
8. "If You Really Had No Fear…" – 1:47
9. "Red" – 2:17
10. "Axiom" – 1:34
11. "PolitiKill Song" – 2:39
12. "Reality Is Rated 'R'" – 1:53
13. "Survive" – 2:32
14. "Not Horrible" – 2:51
15. "Perspective" – 3:20
16. "Give 'em the Muzak" – 2:05

== Personnel ==
- Andy Dixon – guitar, backing vocals
- Jesse Gander – vocals
- Paul Patko – drums, backing vocals
- Dhani Borges – bass guitar
