= The Cost (band) =

American band

The Cost was a San Francisco Bay Area band active between 1999 and 2003. They released an album, Chimera (2002), on Lookout! Records, an EP on New Disorder Records, a split 7-inch with Canadian punk band d.b.s., and were featured on several compilations over the years. They toured extensively on the west coast, mainly in the Pacific Northwest, and also across the United States. The Cost played their last show at Berkeley's 924 Gilman Street, the venue they called home, on July 5, 2003.

Members of The Cost later played in Communique and Middle-Aged Queers. Guitarist Sean McArdle went on to record and release solo material.

== History ==
Oakland natives and childhood friends Stephen Loewinsohn and Shaun Osburn met Michael Hoffman in middle school. The three of them began playing together in various bands in the early 1990s before adding vocalist Laird Rickard and performing as The Cost for the first time on New Year's Eve 1999. Later that year, the band released an eight-song EP that was recorded live over two days. In a review of the EP, music writer Mike DaRonco of Allmusic said the Cost "capture this really dark, chaotic sound with the accompaniment of tribal beats and gruff vocals that sounds as if the singers [are] ready to heave any second."

Rickard left the band in 2000 and was replaced by Sean McArdle. Two years later, the band released their only full-length studio album, Chimera, on Lookout! Records. Allmusic's Erik Hage called the album a "tightly played and aggressive effort that succeeds most when it steers clear of the doomier, sludgy moments." Pitchfork Media's Brendan Reid, in a mixed review of the album, criticized the band's tempo and time signature changes and complimented the album's "more straightforward rock tracks ('Hated Man') and the ones that sustain the quiet side of the dynamics see-saw ('Symptomatic')," where, Reid described, "the band's anger actually sounds like something more than Drive Like Jehu on autopilot."

== Members ==
- Stephen Loewinsohn - Vocals, Guitar
- Shaun Osburn - Bass, Vocals
- Michael Hoffman - Drums
- Sean McArdle - Baritone Guitars, Vocals (2000–2003)
- Laird Rickard - Vocals (1999–2000)

== Discography ==
=== 7-inch singles and EPs ===
- Split with d.b.s. (1999, Sellout Records)
- El Sueno De La Razon Produce Monstrous (New Disorder Records, Bad Monkey Records, 1999)

=== Full-length albums ===
- Chimera (Lookout!, 2002)

=== Compilation appearances ===
- A Little Something For Everyone (New Disorder, 2000)
- Another Juan Rides The Bus (Stickrod Tapes, 2000)
- New Disorder Soda (New Disorder, 2001)
- Lookout! Freakout episode 3 (Lookout!, 2002)
