= I Is for Insignificant =

Studio album by d.b.s.
- Released: 1998
- Genre: Punk rock, pop punk, melodic hardcore, skate punk
- Length: 32:44
- Label: Sudden Death Records; Empty Records (Germany)

D.b.s. chronology
If the Music's Loud Enough… (1996)	I Is for Insignificant (1998)	Some Boys Got It, Most Men Don't (1999)

I Is for Insignificant is the third album released by the North Vancouver punk band d.b.s. It was released by Sudden Death Records in 1998. This was the last studio album to have Dhani Borges on bass guitar; he was replaced by Ryan Angus. In the week of 25 June to 2 July 1998, the album appeared at #46 on the Canadian Top 50 music chart, Chart Attack. It later reappeared in the week of 30 July to 6 August at #27, and again in the week of 1 October to 8 October, this time at #48.

== Track listing ==
1. "Sunday" – 3:06
2. "Viva la Kids" – 2:12
3. "Pet" – 2:32
4. "Jen and Jarid" – 2:24
5. "So Poppy It'll Make You Puke (Part One)" – 2:56
6. "Bloodshot" – 2:27
7. "David O. Is a Nazi" – 2:51
8. "Video Store" – 2:58
9. "Dream" – 1:30
10. "Expectations Are for the Old" – 2:07
11. "So Poppy It'll Make You Puke (Part Two)" – 1:56
12. "Homophobia Is a Crime and You're a Criminal" – 1:45
13. "Five Billion" – 4:10

== Personnel ==
- Andy Dixon – guitar, backing vocals
- Jesse Gander – vocals
- Paul Patko – drums, backing vocals
- Dhani Borges – bass guitar
