= D.b.s. =

Canadian punk rock band

d.b.s.
- Origin: North Vancouver, British Columbia, Canada
- Genres: Punk rock Pop punk Melodic hardcore Skate punk Hardcore punk
- Years active: 1992–2001
- Labels: Nefer Records; Sudden Death Records; New Disorder Records; Crap Records; Ache Records
- Past members: Andy Dixon; Jesse Gander; Paul Patko; Ryan "Nordburg" Angus; Dhani Borges
- Website: Official website (defunct)

Dirty Black Summer, (stylized as d.b.s. ) were a Canadian punk rock band from North Vancouver, British Columbia, Canada. From their beginnings in 1992 to their eventual breakup in 2001, they gained popularity in the Canadian punk rock scene, and to a lesser extent, the U.S. punk rock scene.

During their decade-long career, they released five studio albums, and toured with many well-established punk rock bands such as Rancid, Anti-Flag, D.O.A., Bouncing Souls, Youth Brigade, and many more. Their music drew comparisons to Jawbreaker, Lifetime, and The Promise Ring, among others.

== History ==
The band formed in 1992, when they were only in grade 8, consisting at the time of Andy Dixon, Jesse Gander, Paul Patko, and Dhani Borges. The first songs they played together were covers of The Ramones ("I Believe in Miracles") and Stevie Wonder ("Higher Ground"). They were in grade 11 when they released their first full-length, Tales from the Crib—a pun of Tales from the Crypt, in reference to the band's youth. They went on their first tour that same year, traveling to California with fellow Vancouver punk band Gob.

Their musical career concluded with their final release, Forget Everything You Know. After the release of this EP, they disbanded, and went on to other projects.

Jesse Gander now runs a music studio in East Vancouver, BC and produces/records many bands each year. The studio is called Raincity Recorders.

== Band members ==
- Jesse Gander − vocals
- Andy Dixon − guitar, backing vocals
- Paul Patko − drums, backing vocals
- Dhani Borges − bass (left sometime after recording I Is for Insignificant)
- Ryan Angus (Nordburg) − bass (replaced Dhani in January 1998)

== Discography ==
=== Self-released ===
- Selfexploditory (Cassette) – (1992)
- Lighten Up (Cassette) – (1993)
- Catch 22 (Cassette) – (1993)

=== Full lengths ===
- Tales from the Crib − Nefer Records (1995)
- If the Music's Loud Enough… − Nefer Records (1996)
- I Is for Insignificant − Sudden Death Records (1998)
- Some Boys Got It, Most Men Don't − New Disorder Records (1999)
- If Life Were a Result, We'd All Be Dead − Crap Records (2000)

=== EPs and singles ===
- "Snowball's Rollin' Fine" (7") – Nefer Records (1995)
- When the Meek Get Pinched the Bold Survive (7") – Crap Records (1997)
- Forget Everything You Know (EP) − Ache Records (2001)

=== Split releases ===
- North America Sucks!! (Split album with Anti-Flag) – Nefer Records (1996)
- D.O.A./d.b.s. Split (7") – Empty Records
- The Cost/d.b.s. Split (7") – Sellout Records (2000)

== Other projects ==
- The Red Light Sting − A post-hardcore/art punk band formed as a side-project for d.b.s., with Andy Dixon on guitar and Paul Patko on drums. Now defunct.
- Operation Makeout − Formed in 1999, with Jesse Gander later replacing original member Lee Evernden on bass and vocals.
- Secret Mommy − Andy Dixon's glitch/indietronica music.
- Winning − A band which includes Andy Dixon on vocals, guitar and piano, and Paul Patko on drums and percussion.
- Ghost House – Piano-driven post-punk band fronted by Jesse Gander. Toured and released one album, Departures, on Reluctant Recordings.
- Opus Arise – 8-piece Symphonic Metal featuring Paul Patko on drums.
