= Hardcore '81 =

Studio album by D.O.A.
- Released: 22 April 1981
- Recorded: 1981
- Genre: Punk rock, hardcore punk
- Length: 18:56
- Label: Sudden Death
- Producer: D.O.A.

D.O.A. chronology
| Something Better Change (1980) | Hardcore '81 (1981) | War on 45 (1982) |

Professional ratings
Review scores
| Source | Rating |
|---|---|
| AllMusic | 4/5 stars |

Hardcore '81 is an album by the Canadian hardcore punk band D.O.A. It is considered by some to be the first time that a certain style of punk rock was labeled hardcore.

In 2019, the album was named as the public vote winner of the Polaris Heritage Prize.

== Track listing ==
All tracks are written by Joey Shithead, except where noted.

| No. | Title | Writer(s) | Length |
|---|---|---|---|
| 1. | "D.O.A." | | 1:38 |
| 2. | "Unknown" | Keithley, Chuck Biscuits | 2:30 |
| 3. | "Slumlord" | | 1:55 |
| 4. | "Musical Interlude" | | 0:22 |
| 5. | "I Don't Give a Shit" | | 1:21 |
| 6. | "M.C.T.F.D." | | 1:38 |
| 7. | "Communication Breakdown" (Led Zeppelin cover) | | 1:57 |
| 8. | "001 Loser's Club" | Brian Goble, Keithley, Dimwit, Werner | 1:54 |
| 9. | "Fucked Up Baby" | | 1:27 |
| 10. | "The Kenny Blister Song" | | 0:16 |
| 11. | "Smash the State" | | 1:32 |
| 12. | "My Old Man's A Bum/Bloodsucker Baby" | Keithley, Dimwit | 1:41 |
| 13. | "Waiting for You" | | 0:45 |

CD re-issue bonus tracks
| No. | Title | Writer(s) | Length |
|---|---|---|---|
| 14. | "General Strike" | Keithley, Dave Gregg | 3:36 |
| 15. | "Race Riot" | | 1:06 |
| 16. | "A Season in Hell" | Goble | 2:34 |
| 17. | "Burn It Down" | | 2:34 |

- Some CD re-issues of Hardcore '81 include four bonus tracks from the EP Don't Turn Yer Back (On Desperate Times)

== Personnel ==
- Joey "Shithead" Keithley - lead guitar, lead vocals
- Dave Gregg - rhythm guitar, backing vocals
- Randy Rampage - bass, backing vocals
- Chuck Biscuits - drums

Tracy Marks - acoustic piano on "Unknown" also engineered the album
