= Smoke Signals (MDC album) =

Studio album by MDC
- Released: 1986
- Genre: Punk rock
- Label: R Radical Records

MDC chronology
Chicken Squawk (1984)	Smoke Signals (1986)	This Blood's for You (1987)

Smoke Signals is the second full-length album by the hardcore punk band MDC. The original vinyl release appeared on the band's own Radical Records label in 1986.

== Background ==
The studio album was reissued on CD in 2001 on the We Bite label and distributed by Plastic Head. The album finds the band moving in musical directions outside of hardcore punk, with some tracks featuring hints of classic and progressive rock sounds, though still largely a punk rock album featuring the band's typically tight, fast musicianship. Lyrics focus on sociopolitical themes typical of punk rock at the time, including sentiments critical of the government and of South African apartheid. One of the band's more humorous songs, "Country Squawk" espouses a pro-vegetarian view over fast, twangy country-western musical backing.

== Track listing ==
=== Side One ===
1. "No More Cops"
2. "King of Thrash"
3. "Drink to Forget"
4. "The Big Picture"
5. "Skateboards from Hell"
6. "Tofutti"
7. "South Africa Is Free"

=== Side Two ===
1. "Acceptable Risks"
2. "Missile Destroyed Civilization"
3. "Soup Kitchen Celebrity"
4. "Country Squawk"
5. "Paradise Lost"
6. "Smoke Signals"

"Country Squawk" is a new recording of "Chicken Squawk" from the band's Millions of Dead Children 7-inch EP.

The song "Big Picture" is a cover of a Subhumans song.

== Personnel ==
- Dave Dictor – lead vocals
- Gordon Fraser – guitar
- Franco Mares – bass guitar
- Al Schvitz – drums

with help from:

- Joe (CFA) Rock – bass on "No More Cops", "King of Thrash", "The Big Picture" and "Skateboards From Hell"
- Ex Con Ron [Ron Posner] – guitar on "Acceptable Risks", "No More Cops", "King of Thrash", "The Big Picture" and "Skateboards From Hell"
- Dave Dick – acoustic guitar on "Country Squawk"
- Tom Albino – guitar on "Missile Destroyed Civilization"
