= Win the Battle =

Win The Battle

Studio album by D.O.A.
- Released: 2002
- Genre: Punk rock, hardcore punk
- Length: 42:49
- Label: Can. Friends; Sudden Death
- Producer: Joe Keithley and Cecil English

D.O.A. chronology
Beat Trash (2002)	Win The Battle (2002)	Live Free Or Die

Win The Battle is the 12th studio album by Canadian punk rock band D.O.A. The Slogan on the back cover (Talk - Action = 0) was later used as the title for their 2010 release. All songs are written by Joe Keithley except where noted.

The album is dedicated to the memory of Ginger Goodwin (early BC labour organizer) and to Dimwit. Dimwit was Chuck Biscuits's brother and was in The Skulls together with Joe Keithley. The last song on the album is about Dimwit and how he died.

== Track listing ==
All songs written by Joey Shithead, except where noted.

1. Dead Men Tell No Tales
2. We're Drivin' to Hell N' Back
3. Just Say No to the WTO
4. If I Were a Redneck
5. All Across The U.S.A. Featuring Bif Naked (LP only)
6. I Am Canadian
7. Warmonger
8. The Beer Liberation Army
9. La Grange (ZZ Top)
10. Fuck You w/ the Blues (Gerry Hannah)
11. Curbstomp the Devil
12. Mexican Holiday
13. Return to Lumberjack City
14. Junk City Nowhere (Vancouver)

== Personnel ==
=== The band ===
- The Great Baldini – drums
- Randy Rampage – Bass
- Joey Shithead - guitar, vocals

=== Additional musicians ===
- Bif Naked on All Across The U.S.A.
- Billy Hopeless - vocals
- Michael Rowe - vocals
- Jason Overy percussion
- Shiloh Lindsay - vocals
