= Millions of Dead Cops (album) =

Studio album by MDC
- Released: February 1982; June 1988
- Recorded: December 1981 in Houston, Texas
- Genre: Hardcore punk
- Length: 20:31
- Language: English
- Label: Alternative Tentacles, R Radical, Twisted Chords, Beer City
- Producer: Geza X

MDC chronology
Millions of Dead Cops (1982)	Chicken Squawk (1984)

Millions of Dead Cops is the debut studio album by the American hardcore punk band MDC. It was originally self-released in February 1982, being reissued/remixed through their own label R Radical with help from Alternative Tentacles later that year. Today it is considered a hardcore punk classic. The album was re-released by Twisted Chords in June 1988 as Millions of Dead Cops/More Dead Cops with 13 bonus tracks including both tracks from the "John Wayne Was a Nazi" single, the Multi-Death Corporations EP, the Millions of Dead Children EP and four previously unreleased songs. The original mix of the album was re-released for Record Store Day in 2014 through Beer City Records.

Kurt Cobain listed it in his top 50 albums of all time.

== Track listing ==
All lyrics are written by Dave Dictor, except where noted; all music is composed by Ron Posner, except where noted.

Side one
No.	Title	Writer(s)	Length
1.	"Business on Parade"	music: Posner, Dictor	1:26
2.	"Dead Cops"/"America's So Straight"		1:59
3.	"Born to Die"		1:57
4.	"Corporate Deathburger"	lyrics: Dictor, Al Schvitz	1:16
5.	"Violent Rednecks"		0:39
6.	"I Remember"	lyrics: Dictor, Schvitz, David Alpert; music: Schvitz, Alpert	1:59
7.	"John Wayne Was a Nazi"	lyrics: Dictor, Schvitz	2:01

Side two
No.	Title	Writer(s)	Length
1.	"Dick for Brains"	music: Dictor	1:03
2.	"I Hate Work"	music: Posner, Dictor	0:55
3.	"My Family is a Little Weird"	music: Dictor	1:54
4.	"Greedy & Pathetic"	lyrics: Dictor, Schvitz	1:23
5.	"Church & State"	lyrics: Dictor, Schvitz	0:30
6.	"Kill the Light"	lyrics: Dictor, Schvitz	1:14
7.	"American Achievements"		2:13
Total length:			20:31

CD reissue bonus tracks ("John Wayne Was a Nazi" single)
No.	Title	Writer(s)	Length
15.	"John Wayne Was a Nazi" (original version)	lyrics: Dictor, Schvitz	2:20
16.	"Born to Die" (original version)		2:34

CD reissue bonus tracks (Multi-Death Corporations EP)
No.	Title	Length
17.	"Multi-Death Corporations"	1:51
18.	"Selfish Shit"	2:06
19.	"Radioactive Chocolate"	0:57
20.	"No Place to Piss"	1:00

CD reissue bonus tracks (Millions of Dead Children EP)
No.	Title	Length
21.	"Kleptomaniac"	1:56
22.	"Chicken Squawk"	2:37
23.	"Pecking Order" (re-recording of "Death of a Nun")	1:06

CD reissue bonus tracks
No.	Title	Writer(s)	Length
24.	"Pay to Come Along"		1:04
25.	"Evolution in Rock"		1:01
26.	"Spanish Castle Magic"	written and originally performed by Jimi Hendrix	2:04
27.	"Born Under a Bad Sign"	William Bell, Booker T. Jones; originally performed by Albert King	3:02

== Personnel ==
- Dave Dictor – lead vocals
- Ron Posner – guitar, backing vocals
- Franco Mares – bass
- Al Schvitz – drums

Additional performers

- Buxf Dicks; Tammy Cleveland; J.J. – backing vocals

Production

- Geza X – producer
- Erik Wolf – engineer
- East Bay Ray – mixing
- Dan Yaney – mastering
- Carlos Lowry – front cover art
- Buxf Dicks – back cover art
