= U-J3RK5 =

- Origin: Vancouver, British Columbia, Canada
- Genres: Post-punk, new wave
- Years active: 1978–1981
- Labels: Zulu Records; Quintessence Records; PolyGram
- Past members: Jeff Wall; Rodney Graham; Ian Wallace; Kitty Byrne; Colin Griffiths; Danice McLeod; Frank Ramirez; David Wisdom

UJ3RK5 (sometimes written as U-J3RK5, and pronounced "you jerk" — the five is silent) was a Vancouver-based band from the late 1970s. Their style was post-punk/new wave, but was more art rock than synth pop.

== History ==
UJ3RK5 was formed by Vancouver visual artists Ian Wallace, Jeff Wall and Rodney Graham in addition to Kitty Byrne, Colin Griffiths, Danice McLeod, Frank Ramirez and CBC Radio host David Wisdom. Their self-titled debut EP included "Eisenhower and the Hippies," a song inspired by a work of American conceptual art proponent Dan Graham. The EP was originally released by the independent label Quintessence Records, with a second pressing on PolyGram of Canada.

After a short time, the members disbanded, returning to concentrate on their art careers. However, their music continued to be played and recorded. The Oh Canaduh! compilation albums featured two covers of UJ3RK5. "Eisenhower and the Hippies" was covered by Man or Astro-man? and "Locator" by Servotron. The songs "U-J3RK5 Work for Police" and "Naum Gabo" were included on the 1979 compilation album Vancouver Complication, which was re-released in 2004 on CD with extra songs by Sudden Death Records, and then in 2007 as a 2-LP set with even more extra songs by the Italian label Rockin' Bones.

In December 2016, Primary Information (co-publishing with Emily Carr University Press) released Live from the Commodore Ballroom, a 2-LP set limited to 600 copies. It consists of a soundboard recording of their complete opening set for Gang of Four on May 26, 1980, includes seven previously unreleased songs as well as performances of the four songs from the EP and "Naum Gabo," and is now out of print.

UJ3RK5 was featured in the 2010 documentary film Bloodied but Unbowed, directed by Susanne Tabata.
