= The Dishrags =

Canadian punk rock band

- From left to right: Dale Powers, Carmen "Scout" Michaud, and Jill Bain "Jade Blade".

Background information
- Also known as: Dee Dee and the Dishrags
- Origin: Vancouver, British Columbia, Canada
- Genre: Punk rock
- Years active: 1976–1980, 2006
- Label: Modern
- Past members: Jill bain, aka Jade Blade; Carmen "Scout" Michaud; Dale Powers; Kim Henriksen; Susan MacGillivray

The Dishrags (also known as Dee Dee and the Dishrags) were a Canadian all-female punk rock band based in Vancouver, British Columbia in the late 1970s. Now considered the first punk group of note to emerge from the Vancouver music scene, the Dishrags were influenced by the work of the Ramones, and were forerunners in establishing the city's punk movement. After appearing on the compilation album Vancouver Complication in 1979, the band recorded two EPs and had more tracks released following disbandment.

== History ==
Originally known as Dee Dee and the Dishrags, the band was formed in 1976 in Victoria, British Columbia, a city 60 miles from Vancouver, and included the trio of high school students Jill Bain, aka Jade Blade (lead guitar, vocals), Carmen "Scout" Michaud (drums), and Dale Powers (bass). Moving to Vancouver, with its burgeoning punk rock scene, the Dishrags opened for the city's first punk concert, sharing the bill with the Furies at the Japanese Hall on July 30, 1977. The band performed sporadically thereafter while also attending high school in Victoria, and inspired the formation of three other punk female groups, the Visitors, Devices, and Zellots.

In 1978, the Dishrags returned to Vancouver where they gave many performances, including a concert at the Commodore Ballroom with the Clash in January 1979. By contributing the song "I Don't Love You", the band made its recording debut on the influential compilation album, Vancouver Complication, in 1979. Music critic Stewart Mason wrote of the song's merits: "If they had never made another recording, the Dishrags would remain beloved in punk-fanboy circles for the track 'I Don't Love You'. 103 seconds long and built on an insistent, scratchy guitar riff and a positively crazed drum part played primarily on the ride cymbal, 'I Don't Love You' is as clangorous and primitive as U.K. second-wavers like the Slits or the Desperate Bicycles".

The Dishrags released their EP Past Is Past, containing three tracks, in 1980 on Modern Records. Prior to traveling to London to record their follow-up EP, Powers departed the group, and was replaced by bassist Kim Henriksen and guitarist Susan MacGillivray, both from Devices. Produced by musician Chris Spedding and titled Death in the Family, the EP was released in June 1980 and followed a more pop-based structure. The Dishrags disbanded soon after, but the original trio reunited as the Raisenettes, a Motown-inspired group.

On January 28, 2006, Other People's Music distributed the compilation album Love/Hate, featuring all of the Dishrags' released material, as well as demo recordings, live tracks, and the previously unreleased song, "Bullshit" (which also appears on the reissued version of Vancouver Complication). The Dishrags reformed once in 2006 to tour, and two years later Jem Records released the singles collection, There's No Dee Dee.

The band was featured in the 2010 documentary film Bloodied but Unbowed, directed by Susanne Tabata.

== Discography ==
=== EPs ===
- Past Is Past – Modern Records (MR1), 1979
- Death in the Family – [self-published], 1980

=== Compilation albums ===
- Love/Hate – Other People's Music (OPM-2112), 1996
- There's No Dee Dee – Jem Records (none), 2006
- Past Is Past – Base Records (BASE-019), 2008
- Three – Supreme Records (SE-07), 2015
