= The Jolts =

Canadian musical group

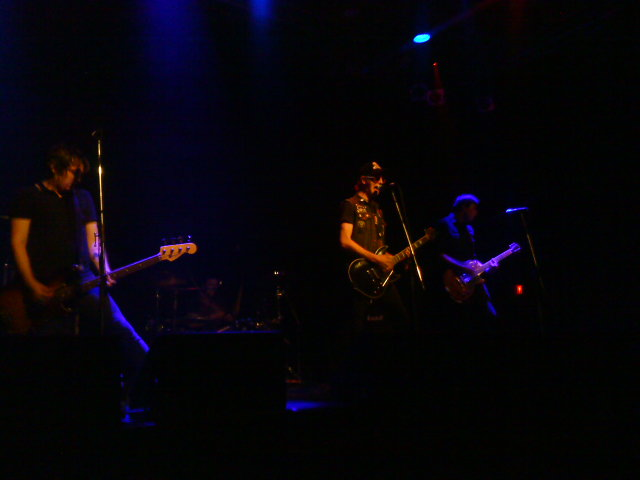
- The Jolts performing in Vancouver on July 18, 2010

Background information
- Origin: Vancouver, British Columbia, Canada
- Genres: Punk rock
- Years active: 2004–present
- Labels: Sudden Death Records
- Members: Joey Blitzkrieg; Joshy Atomic; Matt Dander; Evan Dabbler
- Past members: GT Flare (drums); Lektor Kurrentz (bass); Dylan Danger (guitar); Matt Snakes (Bass)

The Jolts are a Canadian punk rock group formed in Vancouver, British Columbia, in 2004 with a focus on playing relentless high-energy classic 1970s style punk rock.

Members of the band also moonlight as a Ramones tribute band called The Ramores.

== History ==
The Jolts were formed by Joey Blitzkrieg and Dylan Danger in early 2004. After positive reviews of their 2006 EP Jinx, they recorded a track "Rambo Rat" for a Queers tribute album called God Save The Queers. While recording the cover track GT Flare was replaced by former The Spinoffs drummer Matt Dander, the band citing "creative differences".

In 2008, The Jolts self-released their first full-length album Haute Voltage featuring 11 tracks, including a re-recorded version of "Bloody Eye Socket", one of the more popular tracks from The Jinx EP. Shortly after the release of Haute Voltage, Lektor Kurrentz left the band to focus on his other project, The Isotopes. The Jolts acquired bassist Joshy Atomic, who had been playing in The Cheats and Sound City Hooligans.

In late 2009, The Jolts recorded 4 songs that were released on two 7" records. "Born Speedin b/w Gimme gasoline" was released on Edmonton's Eat Shit and Die Records and "Kaminari Lovers b/w Loser (Baby I'm A)" was co-released by American/UK labels Meaty Beaty and No Front Teeth.

After recording another album with producer Jesse Gander in 2010, Dylan Danger left the band to pursue his solo career (as Dylan Thomas Rysstad). That album was released in July 2011 as Eight Percent and is being distributed by Sudden Death Records.

In 2013, the band went into the studio with Adam Payne of The Bad Beats and recorded songs that became the Hammer Every Nail 7" record released later that year on Shake Records. This included a cover of David Bowie's "Diamond Dogs".

On April 22, 2016, The Jolts released "No Paradoxes" on Teenage Rampage Records. Recording again with Jesse Gander, and with the addition of new bass player Evan Dabbler, this session also produced a cover of the Damned's "Neat Neat Neat" released as a flexi.

Since 2006, The Jolts have been on a series of cross-Canada tours supporting each successive release, and are continuing to impress audiences across the country.

== Members ==
Main lineup

- Joey Blitzkrieg – Vocals & Guitar
- Joshy Atomic – Lead Guitar
- Evan Dabbler – Bass
- Matt Dander – Drums & Percussion

== Discography ==
Albums

- Haute Voltage 2008
- Eight Percent 2011
- No Paradoxes 2016

EPs & Singles

- Jinx (5 track EP) 2006
- Born Speedin/Gimme Gasoline (7" single) 2009
- Kaminari Lovers (7" single) 2010
- "Hammer Every Nail" (7" single) 2013

Music Videos

- The Jolts - Born Speedin' on YouTube

Compilations

- God Save The Queers (The Queers tribute album) 2008
