= Terminal City Ricochet =

1990 film by Zale Dalen

- Directed by: Zale Dalen
- Written by: John Conti; Ken Lester; Bill Mullan; Phil Savath; Al Thurgood
- Produced by: John Conti; Dan Howard
- Starring: Peter Breck; Germain Houde; Jello Biafra; Gabe Kouth
- Cinematography: Paul Sarossy
- Edited by: Haida Paul
- Music by: J. Douglas Dodd
- Release date: 1990
- Running time: 107 minutes
- Country: Canada
- Language: English
- Budget: $2.8 million

Terminal City Ricochet is a 1990 dystopian comedy film directed by Zale Dalen. The name was taken from a hockey team called the Terminal City Ricochets.

Starring Jello Biafra (of the Dead Kennedys), Terminal City Ricochet satirizes television and its collusion with government and consumerism. The film was shown at film festivals and on pay cable TV. The DVD combo, which contains both the film and the CD soundtrack, has been made available through the Alternative Tentacles website.

== Plot ==
A young man inadvertently witnesses a killing by his uncle, the corrupt mayor of Terminal City, who retaliates by dubbing him the "Rock and Roll Terrorist" and builds an anti-crime campaign around him.

== Cast ==
- Mark Bennett as Alex Stevens
- Peter Breck as Ross Glimore
- Germain Houde as Ace, the Savior
- Jello Biafra as Bruce Coddle
- Lisa Brown as Beatrice
- Gabe Khouth as Jim Glimore
- Marcel Masse as Wino
- Nelson K. Skalbania
- Joe Keithley as Cop
- Gene Kiniski as Cop

== Production ==
The film had a budget of $2.8 million (equivalent to $5,864,286 in 2025) with $1.8 million coming from Telefilm Canada, $500,000 from BC Film, $500,000 from private investments, and $388,000 in deferrals.

== Soundtrack ==
The soundtrack (released by Alternative Tentacles) features many punk bands including Nomeansno, Jello Biafra, D.O.A., The Beatnigs and others.

== Works cited ==
- Gasher, Mike (2002). Hollywood North: The Feature Film Industry in British Columbia. University of British Columbia Press.
