= Ache Records =

Canadian independent record label

- Founded: 1999
- Founder: Andy Dixon
- Genre: Indie music
- Country of origin: Canada
- Location: Vancouver, British Columbia

Ache Records was an independent record label based in Vancouver, British Columbia, Canada. It was started by the musician Andy Dixon around 1999. Ache releases music for both Canadian and foreign acts. The first release on Ache Records was Hot Hot Heat's release, Hot Hot Heat (1999), a four-song EP. Other notable artists to work with Ache include Death from Above 1979, Four Tet, Hrvatski, Konono N°1, and Matmos.

Ache Records releases albums from disparate genres. The University of Saskatchewan newspaper, The Sheaf, says that Ache has an "inconsistency of genres" and the label distances itself from using genres to describe its releases. Ache has been described by the Montreal Mirror as having an "uncanny ability to meld seemingly disparate worlds into a cohesive whole". Discorder magazine named Ache Records "Label of the Year" for 2004, citing a featured review on Pitchfork Media for Flössin's album Lead Singer, as well as the label's DIV/ORCE 7″ series.

The label became inactive in 2012.

== Ache Records releases ==
The first release on Ache Records was Hot Hot Heat's Hot Hot Heat, a four-song EP. Hot Hot Heat also recorded a split album with The Red Light Sting for the label's (and Hot Hot Heat's) second release.

Dixon's first band, d.b.s., released its final album on Ache in 2001, a five song EP entitled Forget Everything You Know. One thousand copies were issued. Dixon has also released several of his solo albums through the label (as The Epidemic, Secret Mommy, and by his real name), and with the bands The Red Light Sting and Winning.

Femme Fatale's second album, As You Sow, So Shall You Reap, was released by Ache in 2002.

Death from Above 1979 released their first EP, Heads Up, on Ache in 2002, as well as the vinyl edition of their 2004 album You're a Woman, I'm a Machine.

The Swedish band Kid Commando released their only album, Holy Kid Commando, with Ache in 2003. They also released a split single with Kid606 for Ache's DIV/ORCE 7″ series.

The Congolese band Konono N°1 released the vinyl version of their 2004 album Congotronics through Ache. Ache has issued three pressings of the album.

=== DIV/ORCE 7″ series ===
On the DIV/ORCE 7″ series of split 7-inch singles, the musicians on each side have different musical styles. The series began in order to challenge what Ache Records called "finicky sub-genrifying", believing instead that "underground art forms should not be defined". Although Ache does not describe the genres of its releases, the Montreal Mirror says that the pairings on these records are typically between electronic and indie rock acts. The split releases in the series include:

- ACHE013 – Hella / Four Tet
- ACHE016 – Matmos / Die Monitr Batss
- ACHE019 – Sightings / Hrvatski
- ACHE023 – Kid606 / Kid Commando
- ACHE028 – Greg Davis / Of
- ACHE031 – Gorge Trio / Uske Orchestra
- ACHE035 – Bulbs Band / Wobbly
- ACHE039 – The Secret Mommy Quintet / Basketball band

The ninth and final installment was slated to come out in 2011, but it never did, and the series remained incomplete forever.

=== Project: Bicycle ===
Another project of Ache Records was its compilation album Project: Bicycle. The album had eleven songs by various electronic or electro-acoustic musicians. These musicians were given a single sample of music, a recording of a bicycle recorded by Jesse Gander at Hive Studios in Vancouver, and they were tasked with composing a song using only that sample.
