= Forget Everything You Know =

EP by d.b.s.
- Released: April 1, 2001
- Recorded: Rec-age Recorders
- Genres: Punk rock, post-hardcore
- Length: 23:38
- Label: Ache Records

D.b.s. chronology
If Life Were a Result, We'd All Be Dead (2000)	Forget Everything You Know (2001)

Professional ratings
Review scores
Source	Rating
Exclaim!	(favorable)

Forget Everything You Know is the final album released by the North Vancouver punk band d.b.s. It was released by Ache Records on April 1, 2001. Only 1,000 copies were pressed.

The band's sound on this album has been likened to The Promise Ring.

== Track listing ==
Music by Andy Dixon and d.b.s. Lyrics by Dixon, except tracks 3 and 5 by Jesse Gander.

1. "The Weather or Not" – 2:57
2. "Last Chance for a Bad Dance" – 4:36
3. "Begin Again" – 5:39
4. "Our Son, Arson" – 5:57
5. "Letter to You" – 4:29

== Personnel ==
- Andy Dixon – guitar, backing vocals
- Jesse Gander – vocals
- Paul Patko – drums, backing vocals
- Ryan "Nordburg" Angus – bass guitar
