= MDC (band) =

American punk rock band

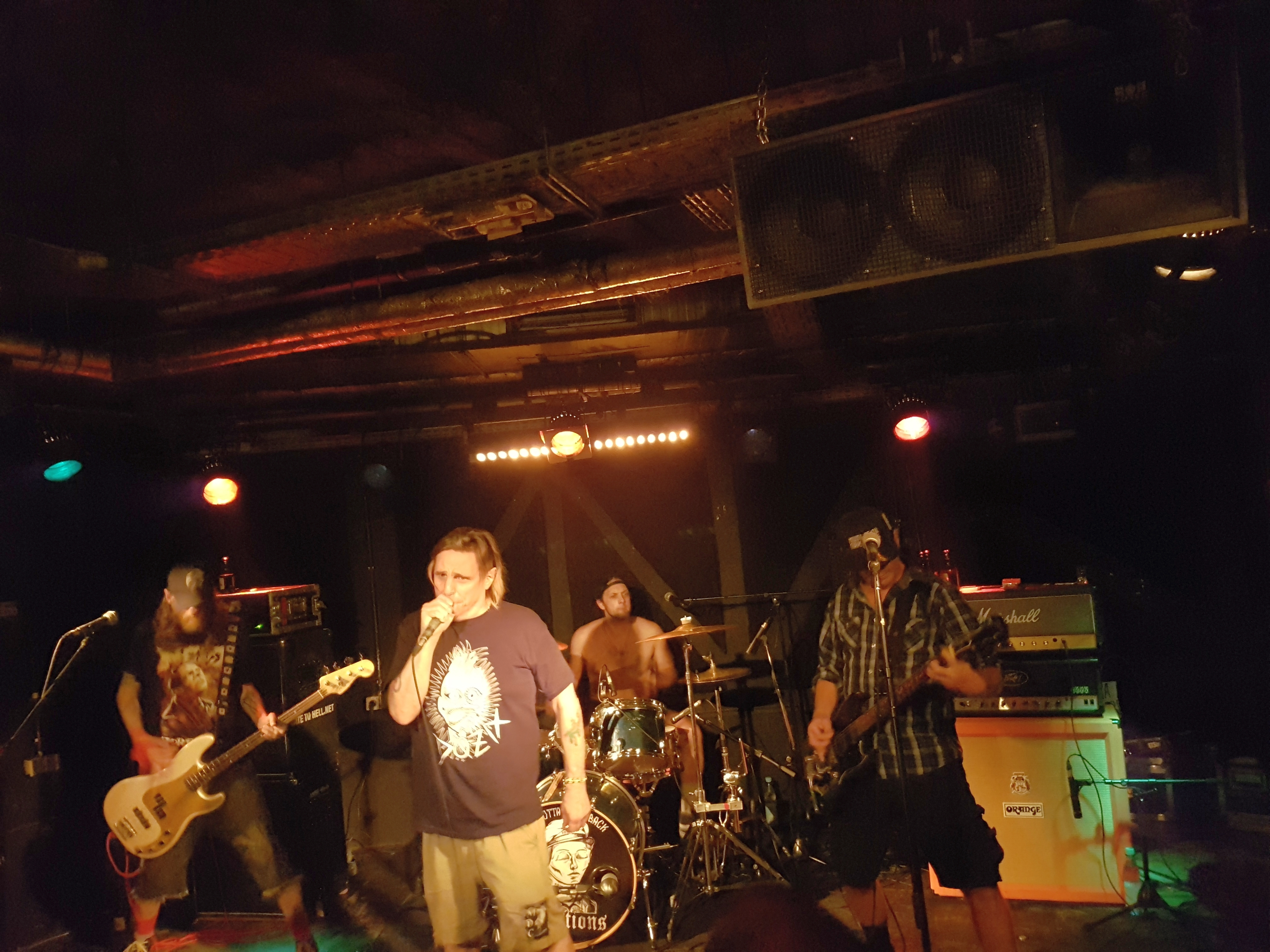
- MDC in 2017

Background information
- Origin: Austin, Texas, U.S.
- Genres: Hardcore punk, punk rock
- Years active: 1979–1995, 2000–present
- Labels: R Radical, Crass, Boner, New Red Archives, Sudden Death, Tank Crimes, Grimace
- Members: Dave Dictor; Adam Crisis; Barry Ward; Erica Liss; Mike Smith
- Past members: Ron Posner; Gordon Fraser; Eric Calhoun; Bill Collins; Chris Wilder; Brendan Bekowies; Michael Donaldson; Franco Mares; Matt Freeman; Erica Liss; Erik Mischo/Matt Van Cura; Al Batross; Mike Pride; Dejan Podobnik; Felix Griffin; Adam Crisis; Erica Liss; Barry Ward
- Website: www.mdcpunkofficial.com

MDC is an American punk rock band formed in 1979 in Austin, Texas, subsequently based in San Francisco, and currently Portland, Oregon. Among the first wave of bands to define the sound and style of American hardcore punk, MDC originally formed as The Stains; they have periodically changed the meaning of "MDC", the most frequent being Millions of Dead Cops. The band's lyrical content expresses radical left political views and has proven influential within the punk subculture.

MDC released material through former Dead Kennedys singer Jello Biafra's independent label Alternative Tentacles. In the 1990s, vocalist Dave Dictor published editorials for the internationally distributed fanzine Maximum Rocknroll. MDC's initial run ended in 1995, and the band spent five years on hiatus, before returning in 2000 with some new band members.

== History ==
=== Early years ===
Formed in the late 1970s as The Stains and playing their first gig under this name in August 1980, MDC were one of three pioneering hardcore punk bands in Austin, Texas, in the early '80s, alongside The Dicks and Big Boys. These bands frequently played together and established the Austin hardcore scene. They released one single as The Stains in 1981, featuring a slower version of the future MDC song "John Wayne Was a Nazi" backed with "Born to Die". Both songs were later released on the debut MDC album.

=== 1980s ===
Dave Dictor cited Black Flag and D.O.A. as early influences of the band: "We saw [Black Flag and D.O.A.] in 1980 when they came out to Texas and they were cookin'. We said 'Man. . . They're feelin it'"

By 1982 the band had relocated to San Francisco, California, and renamed themselves MDC. By this point the band were active participants in the growing hardcore scene and released their debut LP Millions of Dead Cops on their own label, R Radical; Jello Biafra's Alternative Tentacles helped with distribution. The album is now widely considered a punk classic, and features songs such as "John Wayne Was a Nazi", "Dick for Brains", and the harsh criticism of the police, "I Remember". Other targets of criticism devoid of irony included capitalism ("Corporate Death Burger"), homophobia ("America's So Straight"), and American culture ("Violent Rednecks").

During the summer of 1982 they became involved in the Rock Against Reagan Tour, during which time they fell out with the band Bad Brains when Rastafarian singer H.R. learned that Big Boys' singer, Randy Turner, was gay. H.R. and MDC's Dave Dictor had an intense confrontation. Upon Bad Brains' departure from the bill, they refused to return a loan owed to Big Boys and instead left a note that reportedly read "burn in hell bloodclot faggot". The incident resulted in the MDC song "Pay to Come Along". For MDC, 1982 ended with a tour of Europe with the Dead Kennedys which brought the band greater exposure in the punk scene outside of the U.S., especially in the UK.

==== Name change ====
In 1983 the band began to deemphasize the "Dead Cops" aspect of its name, as drummer Al Schvitz noted in a Flipside interview:

It's a problem of people can't see the [name] concept, they take it as a violent action of saying what to do. ... When we chose the name we really didn't figure on all the misinterpretation and we want to work around it and make our point clear and we don't want to have to talk through the name Millions of Dead Cops to any political issue we want to talk about. It doesn't mean that we don't believe in everything that goes down on the first album ...

Their involvement in the Rock Against Reagan activities continued through 1983 and they returned to recording with the EP "Multi-Death Corporations" which was distributed in the UK by British anarcho-punk label Crass Records and R Radical in the U.S. The EP broke new ground by addressing, in the lengthy liner notes and artwork, the growth of corporations and the violent suppression of left-wing politics in Central America. In 1984 they released another EP, Millions of Dead Children (also known as Chicken Squawk), this time dealing with vegetarian and vegan issues via a cowpunk tune.

Iconoclastic punk rock cartoonist John Crawford, an outspoken critic of the band, was cynical in his assessment of the alteration of the band's initial name, which he characterized as "stupid" and "inflammatory". Crawford intimated that the name change had been opportunistic:

It was like they thought there was something to be gained politically from cops busting the heads of kids, the old Yippies routine. ... [C]onfrontational barricades politics are tactics that failed, only helped those they were intended to hurt. Now that was an awful thing for me to say right? But when MDC met with Crass in England, Crass told them they were bothered by the name Millions of Dead Cops and wouldn't include them on a compilation album they were plotting unless they changed it. So Mega Death Corporation was born.

Smoke Signals was released in 1986, their second album featuring a more diverse style than previously, with a foray into '70s rock with the song "South Africa Is Free". This album also saw Gordon Fraser's first appearance as main guitarist. In the same year, MDC backed Michelle Shocked on a version of her song "Fogtown" that appears as a hidden track on her breakthrough album, Short Sharp Shocked.

Their third album, This Blood's for You, followed in 1987 and saw them continuing to showcase orthodox hardcore punk style and classic rock, including a cover of the Cream song "Politician". Themes again included intervention in Central America and criticism of the Reagan Administration. MDC toured Europe in 1988, where the live album Elvis – In the Rhineland was recorded. The band released the album Metal Devil Cokes in 1989 with guitar player Eric Calhoun and bassist Joe Strom.

=== 1990s ===
The 1990s opened with a number of lineup changes, swiftly followed by the 1991 album Hey Cop! If I Had a Face Like Yours ... , featuring Bill Collins (formerly of Fang, Special Forces, Intensified Chaos) on guitar and Matt Freeman (of Operation Ivy and Rancid) on bass. Collins wrote all the music on the album and sang three of the songs. This lineup toured the US and Europe. The acclaimed Shades of Brown album appeared in 1993, released by New Red Archives in the U.S. and We Bite in Europe. The album featured the hip hop vegetarian song "Real Food, Real People, Real Bullets". MDC, now with guitarist Chris Wilder (formerly of Stikky) and bassist Erica Liss, marked the album with a tour of the former Soviet Union, making MDC the first American punk band to tour Russia. This was followed by two more European tours and several U.S. tours until 1995, where began a lull in the band's activity. The lack of new recorded material, other than a 7-inch release on Slap-a-Ham Records, and live performances after 1994, plus personal problems of band members, pointed to an informal break-up of the band. Though the band did a few shows in 1997. Including Punk fest 97 in Seattle WA with Poison Idea, The Accused, and the first performance of Murder City Devils.

=== 2000s ===
MDC's singer, Dave Dictor, returned with an entirely new backing line-up in 2000, which included Long Island musicians Matt Van Cura (bass), Erik Mischo (guitar), and John Soldo (Drums). MDC released a new album, Magnus Dominus Corpus, in 2004. They took part in a 25th anniversary world tour in 2005, with an all-original lineup. Following the death of Mikey Donaldson in September 2007, MDC has been toured Europe and the United states. And released a split 7" with Potbelly from Whidbey Island WA. MDC started touring as both the full band, and MDC acoustic with just Dave Doctor and Mike Smith.

In November 2016, MDC released a video for the forthcoming release of a new recording of "Born to Die", made to protest the Donald Trump presidential campaign. The song's slogan "No Trump, no KKK, no fascist USA" was reported to be heard at anti-Trump demonstrations, at The Women's March in Washington, D.C., on January 21, 2017, and in Chicago. At the 2016 American Music Awards on November 20, the band Green Day adopted the anti-Trump slogan for a controversial impromptu chant during their live on-air performance, which Dictor applauded and encouraged. The media spotlight Green Day's action put on MDC inspired the band to create new material based around the current political climate. The album, entitled Mein Trumpf, was released in 2017.

== Members ==
=== Current lineup ===
- Vocals – Dave Dictor (1979–1995, since 2000)
- Guitar – Russ Kalita (since 2008)
- Guitar – Barry d'live Ward (since 2017)
- Bass – Mike Smith (since 2007)
- Bass – Erica Liss (1992–1995, since 2023)
- Drums – Adam Crisis (since 2023)
- Drums & Percussion - Sage Johnson (since 2026)

=== Former members ===
- Drums – Al Schvitz (1979–2022)
- Guitar – Ron Posner (1979–1986) and (2002–2016)
- Guitar – Gordon Fraser (1986–1987)
- Guitar – Eric Calhoun (1987–1990)
- Drums -John Lieb -(1983–1984)

Mostly for Europe tour.about 50 shows.

- Guitar – Bill Collins (1990–1992) and (2016–2017)
- Guitar – Chris Wilder (1992–1995)
- Guitar – Erik Mischo (2000)
- Guitar – Brendan Bekowies (2001–2002)
- Bass – Michael Donaldson (1979–1982, 2003–2007; died 2007)
- Bass – Franco Mares (1982–1990)
- Bass – Matt Freeman (1990–1992)
- Bass – Erica Liss (1992–1995)
- Bass – Matt Van Cura (2000–2002)
- Drums – Al Batross (2000–2002)
- Drums – Mike Pride (2002–2005)
- Drums – Dejan Podobnik (2006–2007)
- Drums – Felix Griffin (2008)

== Discography ==
=== Singles/EPs ===
- Stains – "John Wayne was a Nazi" 7", R Radical Records, 1980
- Millions of Dead Cops – "John Wayne was a Nazi" 7", R Radical Records, 1981
- Multi-Death Corporations – "Multi-Death Corporations" EP, Crass Records, 1983
- Millions of Dead Children – "Chicken Squawk" EP, R Radical Records, 1984

=== Albums ===
- Millions of Dead Cops (1982)
- Smoke Signals (1986)
- Millions of Damn Christians (1987)
- Metal Devil Cokes (1989)
- Hey Cop!!! If I Had a Face Like Yours... (1991)
- Shades of Brown (1993)
- Magnus Dominus Corpus (2004)
- Mein Trumpf (2017)
- Millions of Dead Cowboys (2020)
- War Is a Racket (2023)
- The Last War (2025)

=== Splits ===
- Millions of Dead Cops / Capitalist Casualties Liberty Gone EP Split 7", Slap a Ham, 1994
- Millions of Dead Cops / Pig Champion Split 7", Honest Don's, 1997
- MDC/Poison Idea split, 2004
- Millions of Dead Cops / John The Baker Split (MDC EP)|Millions of Dead Cops – John The Baker Acoustic Split 7", Tank Crimes, 2006
- Millions of Dead Cops / Potbelly Split 7", PB/Crash Assailant, 2008
- Millions of Dead Cops / Riot Cop Split CD, Malarie, 2008
- Millions of Dead Cops / The Restarts Split LP/CD, No Label Records, 2009
- Millions of Dead Cops / Carburetor Dung / The Bollocks – "MABUKKUASA" Split-CD, S.B.S/Jerk Off Records, 2011
- Millions of Dead Cops / Attentat Sonore Split 7", Guerilla Vinyl / Campary / Fillferro / Tupatutupa Records, October 2011.
- MDC (Acoustic) / Naked Aggression / Raw Power / Som Hi Noise – "No More Borders", Split 7", Jailhouse/Sixty Nine Apples Records, 2012

=== Live recordings ===
- MDC – Elvis In The Rheinland: Live In Berlin LP, R Radical Records, 1989
- MDC – Live In Maribor LP, 1990
- MDC – Live At CBGB's 1983, Beer City Records BCR190-1, 2015 (Limited to 1000 copies, on translucent green vinyl)

=== Compilations ===
- International P.E.A.C.E. Benefit Compilation (R Radical Records, 1984)
- Rat Music for Rat People, Vol. 2 (CD Presents, 1984)
- Millions of Dead Cops – More Dead Cops LP, 1988 (Compilation of EPs)
- Hardcore Breakout USA Volume 2 (New Red Archives, 1995)
- The Punk, The Bad & The Ugly (Cleopatra, 1997)
- At War With Society (New Red Archives, 1998)
- At War With Society II (New Red Archives, 1999)
- Millions of Dead Cops – Now More Than Ever LP, 2002 (Best Of Compilation)
- Solid EP 7" (Crash Assailant, 2008)
- Human EP 7" (Rodent Popsicle/ Crash Assailant, 2009)
- Hardcore Breakout - Essential Punk (New Red Archives, 2012)
- Punk For Ukraine Vol. 1 (Grimace, 2022) – "Mein Trumpf"
