= Kid Commando =

Swedish musical group

Kid Commando was a band from Sweden founded in 1998. They were influenced by Arab on Radar and various noise rock bands. Kid Commando disbanded in 2005 after releasing several 7"s and a debut album entitled Holy Kid Commando in 2003. They continue to influence with their unique and interesting music/noise.

== Members ==
- Eric Olofsson – drums
- Johan Lagerlöf – guitar, vocals
- Joachim Nordwall – guitar (now member of The Skull Defekts)

== Discography ==
- Kid Commando/Radio Berlin 7" (Radio One 1999)
- s/t 7" (Tell Me That You Love Me 2000)
- Kid Commando/The Female Anchor of Sade pic disc 7" (Lady Godiva 2001)
- The French Kiss Is Dead 7" (Lady Godiva 2000)
- Arab On Radar/Kid Commando Split 7" (iDEAL 2002)
- Holy Kid Commando (Ache 2003)
- Kid606/Kid Commando Split 7" (Ache 2006)

== Holy Kid Commando ==
Holy Kid Commando was released in 2003 on Ache Records.

1. "Urban Bushman"
2. "Rhythm Beast"
3. "Black Beauty"
4. "Daredevil"
5. "History Lesson"
6. "Fall Fall Fall"
7. "Lovers Amp"
8. "Nuff Said"
9. "Basic Bioelectrics"
