= Paddy Duddy =

Irish-Canadian drummer

Paddy Duddy (born July 17, 1971, in Derry, Northern Ireland) is an Irish-Canadian drummer. He is best known as the drummer for Canadian punk rock band D.O.A.

== Career ==
Paddy Duddy moved to Canada in 1977 and grew up in Edmonton, Lethbridge, and Calgary, Alberta. He started his first band the 'Delinquents' with brother Mike Duddy in Grade 5 at the age of 10. He moved to Calgary at the age of 14 and started punk rock band 'Play Dead', also with his brother. Play Dead gigged around Calgary for a few years before becoming Guilt Tripp and recording their first album.

In 1990, Paddy moved to Vancouver and formed Rusty Nails with Mike Duddy, Kwayne (Buzz) Busby, and Mike McCoshen (from Six Feet Under). Rusty Nails recorded one full-length record (Rusty Nails - Rusty Nails, 1992) and one 7-inch single shared with Vancouver band Sludge (Corry's Slug and Snail Death Club Grotesque, 1993). Rusty Nails toured extensively from 1990 to 1996 when the band broke up.

Paddy moved to Nelson, British Columbia, in 1999, switched from drums to bass and vocals and formed Circle the Wagons. CTW toured with Nomeansno, D.O.A. , the Hanson Brothers, Dayglo Abortions, among others, and released two full-length albums with Black Banana Records (We're not Old School, We're Just Old, 2003 and Forbidden to Eat Worms, 2007). Circle the Wagons are working on a third release due out in spring 2017. Paddy joined AC/DC tribute band BC/DC in 2003, and played 500 shows all over North America and China until 2015.

In 2014, Paddy joined DOA. He has toured in over 18 countries with DOA. He's released two records drumming for DOA (Hard Rain Falling - Sudden Death Records 2015 and Fight Back- Sudden Death Records 2018), and one single (Fucked Up Donald - Sudden Death Records 2016).

According to The Spill Magazine, "the songs [on Fight Back] are showcased well, with Keithley's guitar and vocal work solidly supported by band members Paddy Duddy on drums, and Mike 'Corkscrew' Hodsall on bass."

== Big Cranium Design ==
Paddy Duddy owns Big Cranium Design, a graphic design and screen printing company in Nelson, British Columbia. He currently resides in Nelson and Vancouver, British Columbia.
