= Subhumans (Canadian band) =

Canadian punk rock band

The Subhumans
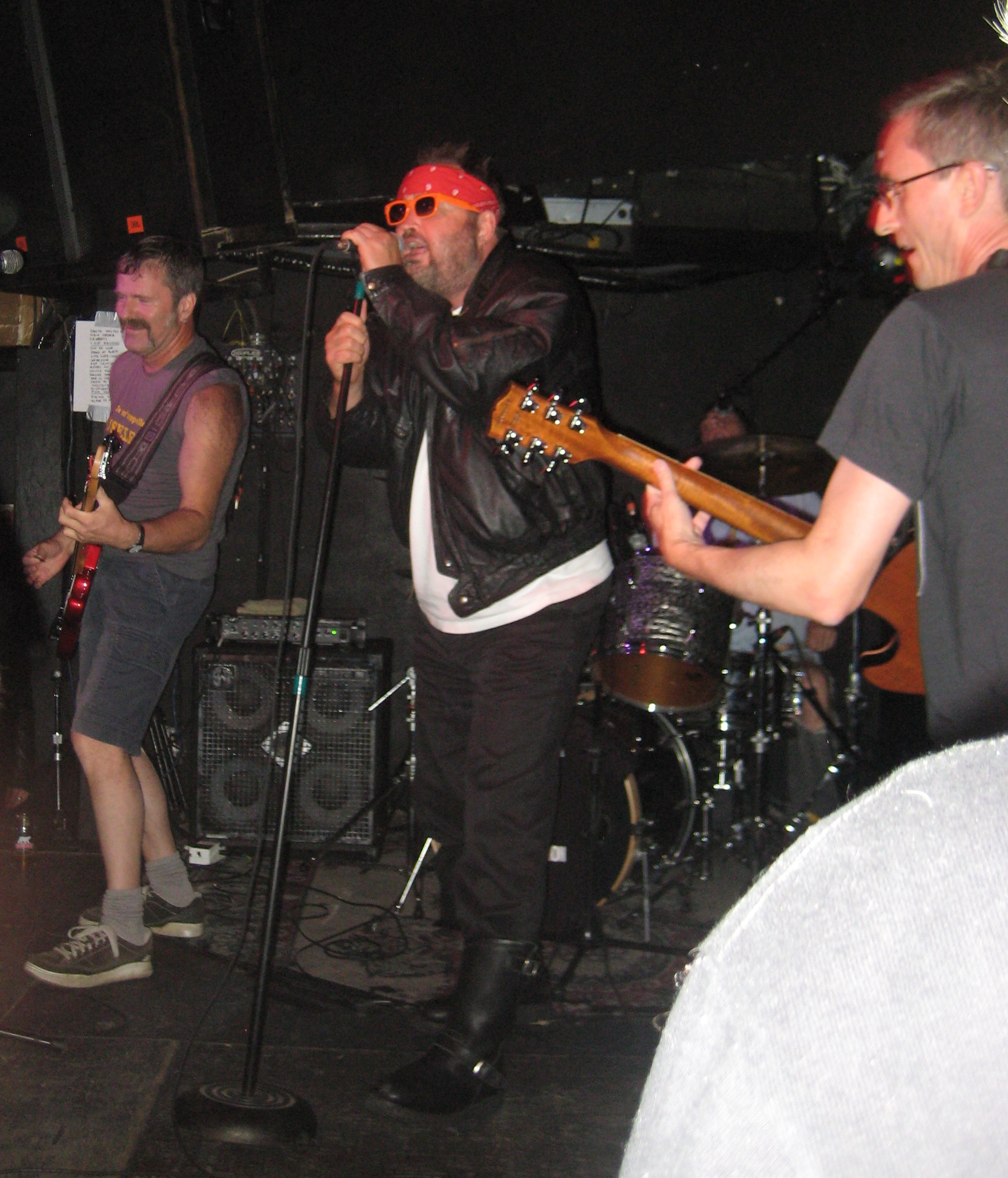
- Gerry, Goble, Jon and Mike playing in Montreal, September 2010

Background information
- Origin: Vancouver, British Columbia, Canada
- Genres: Punk rock
- Years active: 1978–1983, 1995, 2005–2010
- Labels: Alternative Tentacles, G7 Welcoming Committee, Quintessence Records, SST, Friends
- Past members: Brian Roy Goble; Gerry Hannah; Mike Graham; Ken Montgomery; Koichi Imagawa; Ron Allan; Randy Bowman; Jon Card

Subhumans were a Canadian punk rock band formed in Vancouver, British Columbia, Canada, in 1978.

Known by pejorative, punk rock nicknames, original members were known simply as "Useless" (Gerry Hannah), "Dimwit" (Ken Montgomery), "Wimpy" (Brian Roy Goble), and "Normal" (Mike Graham).

== History ==
Dimwit quit the band shortly after their first 7" was released to join the Pointed Sticks, and was replaced by Koichi Imagawa, also known as Jim Imagawa, on drums.

In 1981, Hannah left the band and gradually became involved with a small group of underground activists calling themselves Direct Action. In the alternative media they were referred to as the Vancouver 5, but in the mainstream press they were dubbed the Squamish 5. The group, composed of ecologists and feminists, were responsible for a number of actions, including the 14 October 1982 bombing of the Litton Industries plant in Ontario which made guidance systems for cruise missiles. The Litton bombing hurt several plant workers and three police officers were also injured. While Hannah was not part of the Litton bombing, he supported it, and did take part in other actions, as well as planning to rob a Brinks truck to fund future actions. He was arrested on 20 January 1983, along with the four other members of Direct Action. Many benefits were arranged for the group by people such as Jello Biafra and Joey Shithead of D.O.A. to pay lawyers fees but, in the end, Hannah pleaded guilty to avoid years in prison. He received a 10-year sentence and was released after serving 5 years. During his time in prison, he began writing a column for the fanzine, Maximum RocknRoll, which helped maintain his connection to the punk scene. A number of years after his release he was the subject of a documentary film made by British Columbia filmmaker Glen Sanford, called Useless.

After Hannah left the band, the Subhumans re-formed with Ron Allan on bass. After Imagawa left the band, Dimwit was briefly back with the Subhumans before Randy Bowman joined in his place. With the line up of Wimpy Roy, Mike Graham, Ron Allan, and Randy Bowman, the Subhumans recorded the album No Wishes, No Prayers for Black Flag's SST Records.

The band split in April 1982. Brian Goble went on to join D.O.A. on bass and occasional lead vocals along with Dimwit on drums. Ron Allan and Mike Normal formed Shanghai Dog with Barry Taylor from The Young Canadians and Doug Andrew (later of Circus in Flames). Randy Bowman joined The Enigmas and later went on to join Vancouver band, The Scramblers, along with Ron Allan. Subhumans' songs have been covered by many other bands, including D.O.A., NoMeansNo, MDC, Overkill, Jingo de Lunch, and the Vancouver band Cub, and they are highly regarded within the punk community.

A brief reunion saw the band tour western Canada in 1995. The lineup was Hannah and Goble, joined by Jon Williams on guitar and David "Salty" MacAnulty on drums. They released the album Pissed Off … With Good Reason the following year, a compilation of material previously released only on vinyl and previously unreleased recordings, including a live track and 4 demos recorded in 1981 and seven tracks recorded live in Edmonton during the 1995 tour.

In 2005, the Subhumans reunited with the following line-up: Gerry Hannah on bass, Jon Card (ex-Personality Crisis, SNFU and D.O.A.) on drums, Wimpy Roy on vocals, and Mike Graham on guitar. They signed to Alternative Tentacles and G7 Welcoming Committee Records. A new album, New Dark Age Parade, was released in September 2006. Death Was Too Kind, a compilation of the band's early singles and EPs, was released in 2008. In 2010, the band released the album Same Thoughts, Different Day, a re-recorded version of their 1980 album Incorrect Thoughts. The band wanted to re-issue the original album, but were blocked by an American record company claiming ownership. Deciding it was likely less expensive than fighting a lengthy legal battle, the band chose to re-record the album, including "bonus songs" from the same era that had been unreleased.

Although no formal break-up announcement was made, a string of shows in 2010 after the album's release proved to be the band's final performances. On 7 December 2014, lead singer Brian Goble died of a heart attack at the age of 57.

The Subhumans were featured in the 2010 documentary film Bloodied but Unbowed, directed by Susanne Tabata.

== Discography ==
=== Singles, 7"s, EPs ===
- "Death to the Sickoids" / "Oh Canaduh" 7" (1978)
- The Subhumans EP (Quintessence Records, 1979)
- "Firing Squad" / "No Productivity" 7" (Quintessence Records, 1980)
- Demo/EP Limited Edition EP (2005)

=== Albums ===
- Incorrect Thoughts LP on (Friends Records, 1980)
- No Wishes, No Prayers LP on (SST, 1983)
- New Dark Age Parade LP (Alternative Tentacles and G7 Welcoming Committee Records, 2006)
- Same Thoughts, Different Day CD/LP (Alternative Tentacles, 2010)

=== Anthologies ===
- Pissed Off... with Good Reason CD/Cassette (Essential Noise, 1996)
- Death Was Too Kind CD/LP (Alternative Tentacles, 2008)

=== Compilations ===
- "Death to the Sickoids" and "Urban Guerilla" on Vancouver Complication (1979)
- "Out of Line" and "Behind The Smile" on Vancouver Independence, Friends Records (1980)
- "Slave to My Dick" on Let Them Eat Jellybeans! (Alternative Tentacles, 1981)
- "No Productivity" on Killed By Death #4, Redrum Records (1989
- "Slave to My Dick" on Last Call: Vancouver Independent Music 1977-1988 (Zulu Records, 1991)
- "Firing Squad" on Faster & Louder: Hardcore Punk, Vol. 2, (Rhino Entertainment, 1993)

=== Covered by ===
- Overkill covered "Fuck You" on the !!!Fuck You!!! EP (1987)
- DOA covered "No Productivity" on the "Murder" LP (1990), and also covered "Behind the Smile" for the Terminal City Ricochet film soundtrack (1990).
- Frank Frink Five "Slave to My Dick (Polka Version)" on "Van-Cover" compilation, Garbonzo Bean Productions, 1986
- MDC covered "The Big Picture" in their Smoke Signals LP (1986).
- NoMeansNo covered "Oh Canaduh!" in a 1991 single.
- Leamers covered "Oh Canaduh!" in the Magic, Yo! EP (2012).

== See also ==
- List of 1970s punk rock musicians
- Music of Vancouver
- List of bands from British Columbia
- List of bands from Canada
