= Young Canadians =

Canadian punk rock band

- Origin: Vancouver, British Columbia, Canada
- Genres: Punk, garage rock
- Years active: 1979–1980
- Labels: Quintessence Records
- Past members: Art Bergmann; Jim Bescott; Barry Taylor

Young Canadians (originally The K-Tels) was a Canadian punk rock band formed in Vancouver in 1978 and active for just under two years. The YC's were influenced not only by the other punk bands in town at that time such as D.O.A. and the Pointed Sticks, but also by the New York Dolls, the Stooges, and 1960s garage rock. Although the band only released a small amount of material before breaking up, their single "Hawaii" is one of the classic Canadian punk anthems.

The band's leader, songwriter and guitarist was Art Bergmann, who went on to become one of the key figures in Canadian alternative rock in the 1980s and 1990s. The other band members were bassist Jim Bescott and drummer Barry Taylor.

Their first-ever recording was the song "I Hate Music", for the Vancouver Complication punk compilation album. Just before the release of "Hawaii", they were forced to change their name when threatened with legal action by the K-Tel corporation. The K-Tels supported the Boomtown Rats on a tour across Canada.

Following their breakup, their two EPs and single, plus unreleased live tracks, were re-released in 1995 on the album No Escape, with liner notes written by Buck Cherry. Joyride on the Western Front, a live album documenting a 1980 concert at Mabuhay Gardens, was released in 2001.

Founding member and bassist Jim Bescott died in a parking lot accident in Vancouver on August 31, 2005, at the age of 52.

== Discography ==
- Hawaii 4-song 12" EP
- "Automan" 3-song 7" single (available only as a bonus single inside the first pressing of Hawaii EP)
- This Is Your Life 4-song 12" EP (produced by Bob Rock)
- No Escape (CD compilation of studio and live tracks)
- Joyride on the Western Front' (live concert recording from 1980)
