= Dave Dictor =

American singer

David Dictor
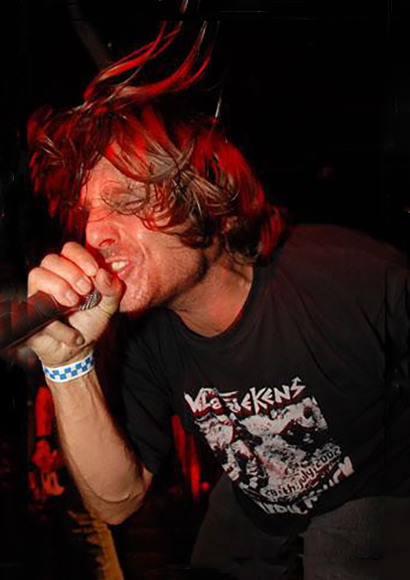
- Dave Dictor sings in Buffalo, New York, April 23, 2009

Background information
- Born: David Scott Dictor; December 4, 1955 (age 70)
- Origin: Glen Cove, New York
- Genre: Hardcore punk
- Occupations: Performer, Musician, Songwriter
- Instruments: Voice, Guitar
- Years active: 1979–present
- Label: Primordial Records
- Member of: MDC
- Website: davedictor.com (archived 26 May 2019)

Dave Dictor (born December 4, 1955) is an American musician, singer of the punk rock band MDC (of which he is a founding member), and founder of the band's label, R Radical Records. Dictor is known for his political lyrics, involvement in the Rock Against Reagan campaign in the 1980s and being vegan.

== Biography ==
David Scott Dictor was raised on Long Island, New York and attended Boston University and the University of Texas in the 1970s. Dictor's father "Teddy" Dictor, was Jewish, while his mother was a Catholic from an Italian American family. His parents divorced when he was two years old, with Dictor raised by his mother, while his father moved to Florida. Dictor identifies as both bisexual and "fluid".

== Career ==
In 1979, Dictor formed the Reejex, which morphed into a band called the Stains, with long-term musical partner Ron Posner. This later evolved into MDC in the fall of 1981. Dictor and MDC later relocated to San Francisco, California in 1982 and finally to Portland, Oregon in 1995. The band gave various projects different names with the MDC moniker, including Millions Of Dead Cops, Multi Death Corporation, Millions Of Dead Children, and Millions Of Damn Christians.

The band's lyrical content expresses radical left political views and has proven influential within the punk subculture.

MDC released material through ex-Dead Kennedys singer Jello Biafra's independent label Alternative Tentacles. In the 1990s, vocalist Dave Dictor published editorials for the internationally distributed fanzine Maximumrocknroll. MDC's initial run ended in 1995, and the band spent five years on hiatus, before returning in 2000 with some new band members.

Dictor also appeared in the 2006 film American Hardcore, the film based upon the book of the same name. The song "I Remember" also appears in the film and on the soundtrack.

In 2016, MDC released a video for the forthcoming release of a new recording of "Born to Die", made to protest the Donald Trump presidential campaign. The song's slogan "No Trump, no KKK, no fascist USA" was reported to be heard at anti-Trump demonstrations in Chicago. At the 2016 American Music Awards on November 20, the band Green Day adopted the anti-Trump slogan for a controversial impromptu chant during their live on-air performance, which Dictor applauded and encouraged. The media spotlight Green Day's action put on MDC inspired the band to create new material based around the current political climate. The album, entitled Mein Trumpf, was released in 2017.

== Books ==
In 2016, Dictor wrote his punk memoir MDC: Memoir from a Damaged Civilization: Stories of Punk, Fear, and Redemption, on his life rebelling against conformity, complacency, and conservatism through MDC.
