= New Disorder Records =

American independent record label

New Disorder Records is an independent record label based in San Francisco, California. New Disorder was home to bands like The Gods Hate Kansas, Half Empty, SPFU, Kitsch, Jack Acid, and American Steel. The label had a wide array of bands some of them featuring women leads whose vocal talent ranged from gritty to crisp. The bands tied to this label all seem to have a different feel then most bands of their time with groove bass sounds tied with hardcore punk guitar riffs.
