= Brian Roy Goble =

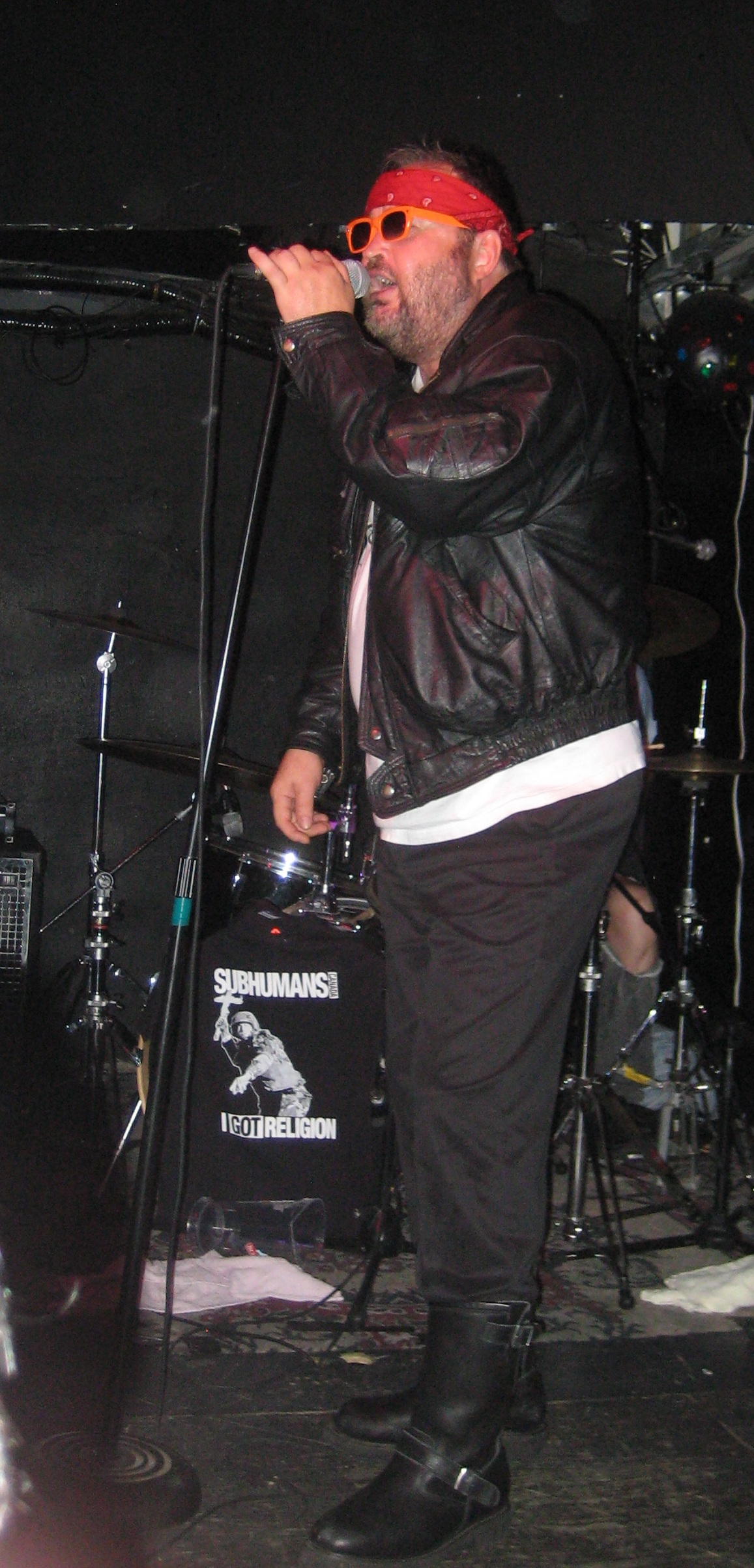
- Wimpy singing for the Subhumans, 2010

Background information
- Also known as: Wimpy Roy; Sunny Boy Roy
- Born: January 4, 1957; Burnaby, British Columbia, Canada
- Died: December 7, 2014 (aged 57) Vancouver, British Columbia, Canada
- Genres: punk
- Instruments: bass, vocals
- Formerly of: Subhumans, The Skulls, D.O.A.

Brian Roy Goble (January 4, 1957 – December 7, 2014), also known as Wimpy Roy or Brian "Sunny Boy Roy" Goble, was a Canadian singer and musician. He played bass and sang for several Vancouver punk bands. After starting with Stone Crazy, Brian then began playing punk rock, playing bass with The Skulls, before becoming lead singer for The Subhumans when The Skulls split. After the demise of Subhumans, Brian joined D.O.A. in the early 1980s as bass player and second singer. After playing and singing on a number of D.O.A. albums, he quit in 1996 after the Black Spot tour. He would later reunite with The Subhumans in 2006.

Goble died of a heart attack on December 7, 2014, aged 57.
