= Andy Dixon =

Canadian musical artist

Secret Mommy
- Also known as: The Epidemic, Secret Mommy
- Born: Andy Dixon
- Origin: North Vancouver, British Columbia, Canada
- Genres: Punk rock (d.b.s.); Glitch, IDM (solo)
- Occupations: Musician, songwriter, producer
- Instruments: Guitar, piano, vocals, computer
- Years active: 1991 – present
- Label: Ache Records
- Website: secretmommy.com andydixon.net

Andy Dixon is a Canadian artist and musician, who gained notoriety as a member of the North Vancouver punk rock band d.b.s. He founded the record label Ache Records, and later played in The Red Light Sting. Beginning in 2003, during the final months of The Red Light Sting, he began to cut up audio recordings he made himself and compose glitch/IDM music under the alias Secret Mommy, though he used The Epidemic for his first solo release.

== Biographical background ==
The son of two accountants, Dixon began expressing himself creatively at a young age. He grew up in North Vancouver. His parents were supportive of their son's musical endeavors, giving him his first guitar at age 9 or 10, allowing him as a teenager to go on tours with his band for weeks at a time, and often lending him money so he could keep doing so.

== Musical projects ==
=== d.b.s. ===
Andy Dixon began playing guitar in the band d.b.s. around the age of twelve in 1991 with bandmates Paul Patko (drums), Jesse Gander (vocals), and Dhani Borges (bass), drawing from influences such as Bad Religion and, later, Jawbreaker. The group decided to disband in October 2000 after over eight years, five full-length records, and the release of their final EP, Forget Everything You Know, regarded as their most mature effort. Forget Everything You Know was released on Dixon's Ache Records.

=== The Red Light Sting ===
Near the end of d.b.s., Dixon, along with future business partner Zoë Verkuylen and friend Gregory Adams of The Self Esteem Project started toying with songs under the name Hooray for Everything. Due to other members leaving the group, the original three took their songs to Paul Patko of d.b.s., who agreed to be their drummer. This change in personnel warranted a change in the band's name to The Red Light Sting.

Their sound was predominantly post-hardcore, with noise core influences. Gregory Adams's vocals ranged from screaming to soft singing. Zoë Verkuylen played a Roland Juno-60 keyboard as a rhythm instrument, often playing off key notes and dissonant riffs. Though Dixon, who played guitar for the band, was the leading creative force behind the group, Adams has been quoted as saying in Discorder that when they were together, "the songs write themselves".

After four years, The Red Light Sting disbanded, holding their last shows in Seattle and Vancouver in early September 2004. In that time, they released two EP's—And Our Love is Soaking in It and Rub 'Em Out—as well as a split LP with Hot Hot Heat. Their final release was Hands Up, Tiger, a ten-song LP which came out less than a month before the band split up.

=== Early solo work ===
It was at this time that Dixon realized the potential of his computer as a musical medium, something he had already been doing in his spare time: he produced a record under the moniker of The Epidemic on Ache Records. This solo debut saw Dixon "combining an indie rock sensibility with vague electronic flashes and jilting experimentation with arrangements".

In an interview with Discorder, Dixon explained that he needed to take time off from playing in a band, something which he had been doing since he was twelve. Instead he focused his efforts on his record label, Ache Records, and his solo music project, now called Secret Mommy.

=== Secret Mommy ===
His first full-length album as Secret Mommy, Babies That Hunt, was released on Orthlorng Musork of San Francisco, a label known for their "laptop musicians" and "electro-punk" artists. He released his first full-length Secret Mommy record before the final Red Light Sting album was released.

The second full-length, Mammal Class, was released later in the same year on Ache Records. Mammal Class includes samples of Pink, Mary J. Blige, Andrew W.K., Britney Spears, Shania Twain, Justin Timberlake, Arab on Radar, as well as some more unconventional sounds: elephants, frogs, pigs, French educational records, balloons, eating noises.

For his third release, Dixon used samples from a trip to Hawaii, known as the Hawaii 5.0 EP. The album title is taken from a combination of sources: it is self-referential in that it is based on samples recorded in Hawaii, there are five tracks, and the "5.0" is a reference to software versioning (e.g. iTunes v7.7), in acknowledgement of the electronic nature of the music; the title also hints at the American television show Hawaii Five-O.

Making use of handmade hidden condenser microphones Dixon compiled recordings for his third full-length record Very Rec. All of the sounds recorded by Dixon for this effort were in places of recreation such as tennis courts, a swimming pool, a soccer field, a yoga studio, an ice rink, a squash court, a dance studio, a dojo, a daycare, a weight room and a basketball court. This style of sampling from the natural world, the world around us may sometimes be referred to as "organic sounds".

The Wisdom EP, release on Sublight Records in September 2006, is the fifth Secret Mommy release, composed entirely of sounds made during an operation where Andy had his wisdom teeth removed.

Plays was a full-length put out by Ache Records in 2007, which was made to "showcase [Dixon's] experience as a guitarist, songwriter, and lyricist". It was recorded at The Hive in Vancouver.

The fifth Secret Mommy album, The Mall was released by Ache Records in 2011.

=== Other musical projects ===
Andy plays guitar and piano, and sings in a group called Winning, with Paul Patko (who played with Andy in d.b.s. and The Red Light Sting) on drums and percussion. Their debut album, This Is an Ad for Cigarettes, was released 20 March 2007 by Ache Records. Andy played with The Secret Mommy Quintet, consisting of many people involved in the production of Plays, during the first day of Music Waste 2007.

Andy was also a member of Tights with Tyr and Todd from The Winks. Their only release is a split they did with the Winks in 2006 on Drip Audio Records.

Andy also DJs at various events around Vancouver under the name Girlfight with Michael LaPointe. Girlfight has hosted several successful late-night outdoor dance parties, Hugeness, a monthly heat-themed event at the Grace Gallery, Sunburn, and a weekly '90s hip-hop night at the Biltmore Cabaret, House Party, during the summer of 2009. Girlfight has received favorable reviews in Discorder Magazine for House Party and for their opening set for GZA.

== Ache Records ==
Andy Dixon is an active member of the Vancouver, British Columbia music and art scenes, with Ache Records his most well-known endeavor. Dixon claims to have put all profits back into the label to release more records. The most well known releases to date are probably their Death from Above 1979 albums, and the "Divorce Series" split 7-inch records, which feature artists who break away from their typical genres.

Ache Records has released albums by Hot Hot Heat, Radio Berlin, Femme Fatale, Death from Above 1979, and Konono N°1, among others.

== Art ==
Dixon works as a freelance graphic designer; his company is The Chemistry Designs. He has collaborated with artist Landon Metz and the two have exhibited paintings together.

In 2008, Dixon Released a book titled Weird Weight.

Dixon's artwork is currently represented by grace-gallery in Vancouver. His first solo art show in 2008, "How to Draw Everything", showed 16 original works and sold out. Dixon has presented work in several other group shows, he is the featured artist of ArtWalk Vancouver 2010 and his second solo show, "Such Events Have Led Us Here", is in preparation at grace-gallery in February 2010. Andy works typically with mixed media on paper.

== Discography ==
The following are solo albums released by Dixon.

Released as The Epidemic:

- I Am Completely Operational (2001, Ache Records)
- Now Museum: Now You Don't (2002, OHEV Records)

Released as Secret Mommy:

- Babies That Hunt (2003, Orthlorng Musork)
- Mammal Class (2003, Orthlorng Musork, Ache Records)
- Hawaii 5.0 EP (2004, Ache Records)
- Very Rec (2005, Ache Records)
- The Wisdom EP (2006, Sublight Records)
- Plays (2007, Ache Records, Reluctant Recordings double LP, Powershovel Japan)
- The Mall (2011, Ache Records)

Released as Andy Dixon:

- The Mice of Mt. Career (2008, Ache Records)

Released as Caving:

- U.S. Caves (2010, Ache Records)
