= D.O.A. (band) =

Canadian punk rock band

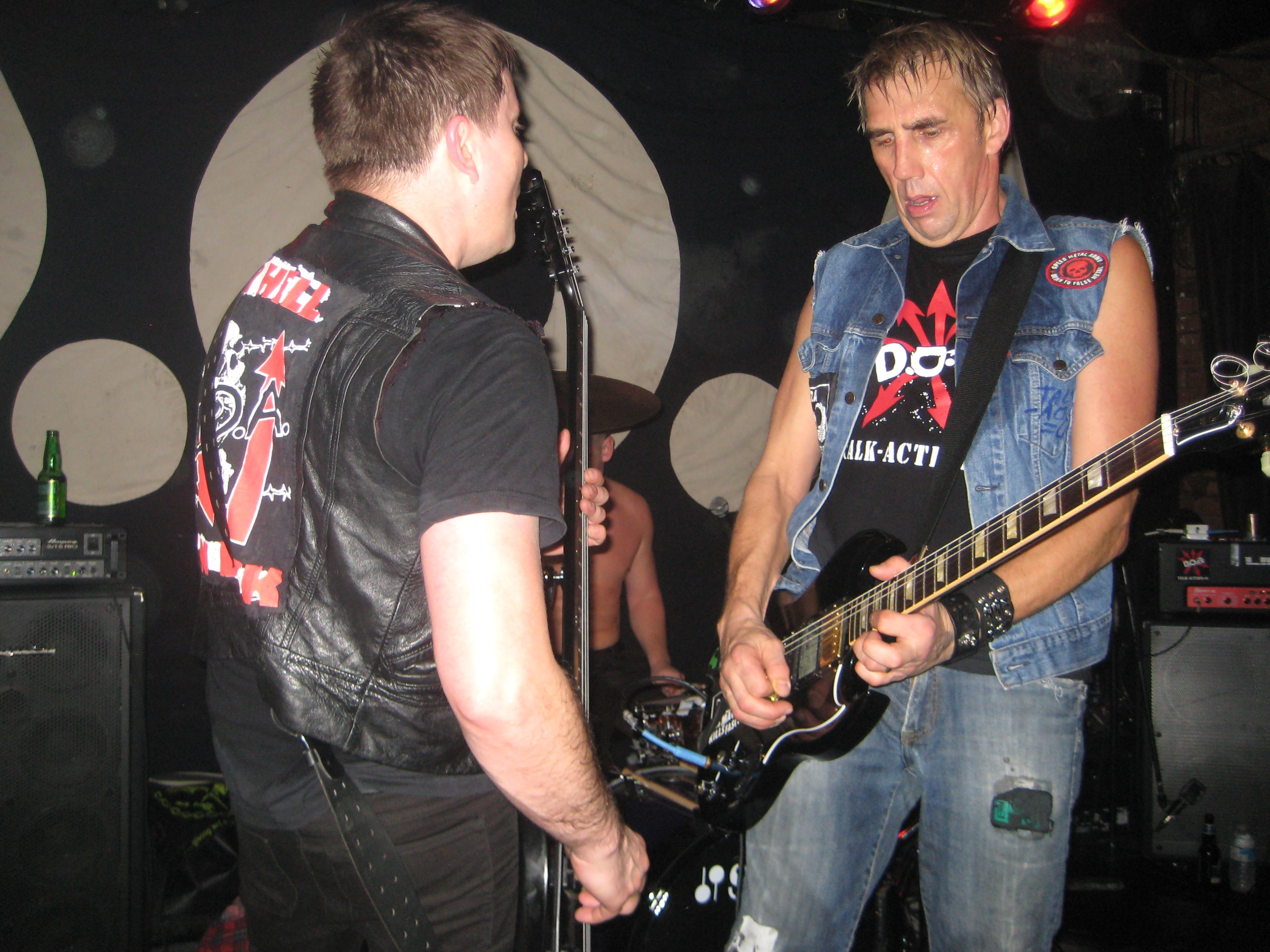
- D.O.A. playing at Montreal's Cafe Chaos in 2010

Background information
- Origin: Vancouver, British Columbia, Canada
- Genres: Hardcore punk
- Years active: 1978–1990; 1992–2013; 2014–present
- Labels: Alternative Tentacles; Sudden Death
- Members: Joe Keithley; Mike Hodsall; Paddy Duddy
- Past members: Chuck Biscuits; Randy Rampage; Dave Gregg; Brian Roy Goble; Dimwit; Chris Prohom; Jon Card; Ken Jensen; Ford Pier; John Wright; Brien O'Brien; The Great Baldini; Brad Kent; Floor Tom Jones; Dan Yaremko; Kuba van der Pol

D.O.A. is a Canadian punk rock band from Vancouver, British Columbia. They are often referred to as being among the "founders" of hardcore punk, along with Black Flag, Dead Kennedys, Bad Brains, Angry Samoans, Germs, and Middle Class. Their second album Hardcore '81 was thought by many to have been the first actual reference to the second wave of the American punk sound as hardcore.

Singer/guitarist Joey "Shithead" Keithley is the only founding member to have stayed in the band throughout its entire history, with original bassist Randy Rampage returning to the band twice after his original departure. D.O.A. has often released music on Jello Biafra's Alternative Tentacles Records, and they have released an album with Biafra on vocals titled Last Scream of the Missing Neighbors.

D.O.A. is known for its outspoken political opinions and has a history of performing for many causes and benefits. Its slogan is "Talk Minus Action Equals Zero". The band's lyrics and imagery frequently advocate anti-racism, anti-globalization, freedom of speech, and environmentalism. In support of the Vancouver 5 defence fund, the band released the single Burn it Down from Hardcore '81. In a 1984 interview, Keithley stated that the Burn it Down 45 had raised at least $2,500, and disclosed that he was called by defence counsel as a character witness for Gerry Hannah while Hannah's sentencing was pending.

Founder Joe Keithley is also the founder of Sudden Death Records which has released music by D.O.A. and several other bands including Pointed Sticks and Young Canadians.

== History ==
=== Formation and early years (1977–1980) ===
D.O.A. has its origins in the Skulls, an early Vancouver-area punk rock band that included future D.O.A. members Joey "Shithead" Keithley, along with founding members of the Subhumans, Brian "Wimpy Roy" Goble and Ken "Dimwit" Montgomery.

When the Skulls broke up after an ill-fated move to Toronto, Keithley moved back to Vancouver and formed D.O.A. in early 1978 with himself on guitar, Dimwit's brother Chuck Biscuits on drums, Randy Rampage on bass, and a lead singer known only as "Harry Homo", who suggested the band's name. The band's first gig took place at the Japanese Hall in Vancouver on February 20 of that year, after which Harry Homo was sacked for an apparent lack of rhythm; Keithley then became the band's singer. A second guitarist named "Randy Romance" played briefly with the band in March 1978 before leaving.

The band began playing frequently around Vancouver and added guitarist Brad Kent the following June. That summer, they recorded and self-released their first single, the four-song EP Disco Sucks. The single soon topped the charts of the University of San Francisco radio station KUSF, which prompted the band to begin touring down to San Francisco. They played their first shows there in August 1978 at Mabuhay Gardens. It was during this trip that the band first met Dead Kennedys frontman and future collaborator Jello Biafra. Kent was fired from the band in September and later that fall the band recorded and released their second single "The Prisoner".

In May 1979, the band embarked on their first North American tour. Upon its completion they hired Vancouver journalist and activist Ken Lester as their manager. Lester booked another tour for them the following October, in the middle of which they flew back to Vancouver to open for the Clash at the Pacific Coliseum. They soon after released their third single, "World War 3" / "Whatcha Gonna Do?". In late 1979, they added second guitarist, Dave Gregg. Soon after, Biscuits and Rampage left the band after a disastrous gig at the University of British Columbia's Student Union Building and were replaced by Andy Graffiti and Simon "Stubby Pecker" Wilde on drums and bass, respectively. Keithley soon became dissatisfied with the band's performances with the new line-up, however, and Biscuits and Rampage both rejoined the band in March 1980.

D.O.A. released their full-length debut Something Better Change on Friends Records in 1980 and continued touring the United States and Canada extensively.

=== Hardcore '81 and further line-up changes (1981–1989) ===
On April 22, 1981, the band released their second album Hardcore '81; the record's title and its extensive North American promotional tour is sometimes credited with popularizing the term hardcore punk.

Randy Rampage was fired from the band on January 1, 1982, and was replaced by ex-Skulls drummer Dimwit on bass. After a short tour of California, Chuck Biscuits left the band and joined Black Flag. Dimwit switched back to drums and Subhumans singer Wimpy Roy, another ex-Skulls member, was hired as the new bass player and second singer, leaving Keithley as the last remaining original member. This line-up would last from 1982–1983 and later 1985–1986 and produced several notable releases, including the EP War on 45 (now expanded into a full-length album). War on 45 found the band expanding their sound with touches of funk and reggae, as well as making their anti-war and anti-imperialist political stance more clear.

1985's Let's Wreck the Party and 1987's True (North) Strong And Free saw the band taking on a more mainstream, hard-rock oriented production, but without watering down the band's political lyrical focus. Meanwhile, the band's line-up changes continued after Let's Wreck the Party, with Dimwit replaced by Kerr Belliveau. Belliveau stayed only three weeks with the band but recorded the Expo Hurts Everyone 7" as well as two songs for True (North) Strong and Free before being replaced by Jon Card from Personality Crisis. Dave Gregg quit in 1988 after D.O.A. fired their manager Ken Lester, to which he was close. The band hired Chris Prohom from the Dayglo Abortions as a replacement.

=== First break-up and reunion (1990–2002) ===
1990's Murder featured rawer, almost thrash metal production, rather than their original basic punk sound. The same year also produced a collaboration with Dead Kennedys singer Jello Biafra with Last Scream of the Missing Neighbors. In August 1990, Joey decided he was breaking up D.O.A. but, at the suggestion of promoter Dirk Dirksen, they did a farewell tour of the West Coast, playing their "final" show on December 1, 1990, at the Commodore in Vancouver. In 1991, they released a posthumous live album entitled Talk Minus Action = 0 while Keithley pursued an acting career.

19 months after D.O.A. broke up, Joey Shithead and Wimpy Roy had reunited as D.O.A in the summer of 1992. Fellow Canadian punk rock veteran John Wright from NoMeansNo suggested they hire Ken Jensen from Red Tide as the new drummer, which they did. The new line-up released an EP and two albums in the early 1990s, 13 Flavours Of Doom and Loggerheads. These albums were produced by Wright, who also played keyboards on the recordings. The band then added Ford Pier on guitar and vocals.

Tragedy struck in 1995 when drummer Ken Jensen died in a house fire. The "Ken Jensen Memorial Single" EP was released on Alternative Tentacles, including two tracks each from D.O.A. and Red Tide. With John Wright filling in on drums, ninth full-length The Black Spot was recorded.

The late 1990s found the band's line-up in turmoil, with Wimpy Roy leaving the band after a decade and a half of service and Kuba joining to play bass from 1997 until 2001. Keithley experimented with different bassists and drummers and released the album Festival Of Atheists in 1998. By the early 2000s, the band had found a permanent drummer in the form of the Great Baldini. In 2002, Keithley put out his first solo album, Beat Trash, and original bassist Randy Rampage returned to the band after nearly 20 years for the Win the Battle album. However, the reunion did not last, with Rampage leaving the band again after the recording of the album, to be replaced by Dan Yaremko.

The Lost Tapes was the first release on Keithley's revived Sudden Death label, followed by Festival Of Atheists. During this period, Keithley also oversaw the re-release of the band's classic early records on Sudden Death, several of which had been out of print for many years.

=== Later years and second hiatus (2003–2013) ===
In 2003, Vancouver Mayor Larry Campbell declared December 21 to be "D.O.A. Day" in honour of the band's 25th anniversary. In the same year, the band released a career-spanning retrospective entitled War And Peace. 2004 found the band releasing the ska-flavoured Live Free or Die. In 2006, Randy Rampage rejoined D.O.A. for his 3rd stint in the band.

The line-up remained stable until 2008, when the Great Baldini left the band to be replaced by new drummer James Hayden. Also in 2008, it was announced that Bob Rock, of Metallica fame would be producing the band's next album in time for their 30th anniversary. James Hayden quit before D.O.A. started to record to be replaced by Floor Tom Jones. In September 2008, D.O.A. released Northern Avenger and embarked on their 30th anniversary tour. On the eve of the tour, it was announced that Randy Rampage was being replaced by Dan Yaremko once again.

D.O.A. played several dates in the summer of 2009 as part of the Van's Warped Tour 2009.

On May 1, 2010, D.O.A. released their fourteenth full-length album Talk Minus Action = Zero (a similarly titled live album Talk Minus Action Equals Zero had previously been released in 1990). Drummer Jesse Pinner (of the band Raised by Apes) took the place of Floor Tom Jones beginning on D.O.A.'s subsequent August 2010 tour due to Floor Tom Jones' commitments to his job at Canada Post.

In 2012, Joe announced that he would be seeking nomination as an NDP candidate in the B.C. provincial election. As a result, D.O.A. announced an indefinite hiatus, and began their farewell tour on January 18, 2013, in celebration of the band's thirty-five year anniversary.

=== Second reunion and recent activity (2014–present) ===
On September 22, 2014, Keithley officially announced on the Sudden Death Records website that he had decided to reform the band with Paddy Duddy on drums and Mike "Maggot" Hodsall on bass, and would be embarking on a Canadian tour in October in support of the recently released live album, Welcome To Chinatown. This line-up recorded and released the studio album Hard Rain Falling in 2015. In April 2016, the band released a new version of "Fucked Up Ronnie" entitled "Fucked Up Donald" (referring to the 2016 Republican presidential nominee Donald Trump) as a single.

== Members ==
Current line-up

- Joe Keithley – vocals, guitar (1978–present), bass (1996–1998)
- Mike Hodsall – bass (2014–present)
- Paddy Duddy – drums (2014–present)

Former members

- Harry Homo – lead vocals (1978)
- Brad Kent – guitar (1978)
- Randy Romance – guitar (1978)
- Zippy Pinhead – drums (1979; died 2019)
- Simon Wilde – bass (1979–1980; died 1994)
- Andy Graffiti – drums (1979–1980)
- Randy Rampage – bass (1978–1979, 1980–1982, 2000–2002, 2006–2009; died 2018)
- Chuck Biscuits – drums (1978–1979, 1980–1982)
- Dave Gregg – guitar (1979–1988; died 2014)
- Brian Roy Goble – bass (1982–1996; died 2014)
- Ken "Dimwit" Montgomery – bass (1982), drums (1982–1983, 1984–1986; died 1994)
- Gregg "Ned Peckerwood" James – drums (1983–1984)
- Kerr Belliveau – drums (1986)
- Jon Card – drums (1986–1990; died 2024)
- Chris Prohom – guitar (1988–1990)
- Ken Jensen – drums (1992–1995; died 1995)
- Ford Pier – guitar (1994–1996)
- Wycliffe – bass (1997)
- Kuba van der Pol – bass (1998–2000, 2002–2003)
- Brien O'Brien – drums (1997–1999)
- The Great Baldini – drums (2000–2008)
- Dan Yaremko – bass (2003–2006, 2009–2013)
- Floor Tom Jones – drums (2008–2010)
- Jesse Pinner – drums (2010–2013)

== Discography ==
=== Studio albums ===
- Something Better Change (1980)
- Hardcore '81 (1981)
- Let's Wreck the Party (1985)
- True (North) Strong and Free (1987)
- Murder (1990)
- 13 Flavours of Doom (1992)
- Loggerheads (1993)
- The Black Spot (1995)
- Festival of Atheists (1998)
- Win the Battle (2002)
- Live Free or Die (2004)
- Northern Avenger (2008)
- Kings of Punk, Hockey and Beer (2009)
- Talk-Action=0 (2010)
- We Come in Peace (2012)
- Hard Rain Falling (2015)
- Fight Back (2018)
- Treason (2020)

=== Live albums ===
- Talk Minus Action Equals Zero (1991)
- Welcome to Chinatown (2013)

=== EPs ===
- Positively (1981)
- War on 45 (1982)
- D.O.A. & Thor – Are U Ready (2003)

=== Collaborations ===
- Last Scream of the Missing Neighbors (with Jello Biafra) (1990)

=== Solo albums ===
- Beat Trash (2002) – Solo project from Joey "Shithead" Keithley
