= Pointed Sticks =

Canadian punk rock/new wave band

- Origin: Vancouver, British Columbia, Canada
- Genres: Punk rock; new wave
- Years active: 1978–1981; 2006–present
- Labels: Stiff; Zulu; Sudden Death; Northern Electric Records; Quintessence
- Members: Nick Jones; Bill Napier-Hemy; Gord Nicholl; Tony Bardach; Ian Tiles
- Past members: Robert Bruce; Ken Montgomery; Johnny Ferreira; Scott Watson

Pointed Sticks (sometimes credited as the Pointed Sticks) are a Canadian punk rock/new wave band from Vancouver consisting of vocalist Nick Jones, guitarist Bill Napier-Hemy, bassist Tony Bardach, drummer Ian Tiles, and keyboardist Gord Nicholl. Originally active from 1978 to 1981, the band reunited in 2006 and have since been sporadically active. As of 2025, they have released four studio albums and three compilations.

== History ==
Pointed Sticks was formed in Vancouver, British Columbia, Canada, in 1978, by vocalist Nick Jones, guitarist Bill Napier-Hemy, bassist Tony Bardach, and drummer Ian Tiles; keyboard player Gord Nicholl joined soon after. They later added Johnny Ferreira on saxophone, Scott Watson took Bardach's place, and Tiles was replaced by Robert Bruce and later by Ken Montgomery.

The band released three singles and were subsequently signed to Stiff Records, the first Canadian band on the British label's roster. They travelled to London and recorded an album with Nigel Gray, but the label chose not to release it, and the band returned to Canada. Once there, they re-recorded their material with Bob Rock and issued their debut studio album, Perfect Youth, in 1980. They appeared in the 1980 Dennis Hopper film Out of the Blue and broke up the following year.

The first compilation of their recordings, Part of the Noise, was released in 1995 on Zulu Records. Perfect Youth was reissued by Sudden Death Records in 2005 with four bonus tracks, and a year later, another compilation, consisting of singles, outtakes, and other rarities, entitled Waiting for the Real Thing, came out.

The original members of Pointed Sticks reunited in 2006 for a tour of Japan and continued to play sporadic concerts in Canada and the United States. A compilation titled Stiff Sessions was issued in Japan in 2008. In 2009, the band recorded an album of all new material, Three Lefts Make a Right, which was released in November by Northern Electric Records.

Pointed Sticks were featured in the 2010 documentary film Bloodied but Unbowed, about the Vancouver punk rock scene, directed by Susanne Tabata.

A third, self-titled full-length album came out on Northern Electric via Sudden Death Records in 2015. In 2022, the band released Beautiful Future.

== Name ==
The band gets its name from a Monty Python sketch, "Self-Defence Against Fresh Fruit", wherein Eric Idle repeatedly suggests that learning to defend against something like a pointed stick might be more useful than defending against fresh fruit.

== Band members ==
Current

- Nick Jones
- Bill Napier-Hemy
- Gord Nicholl
- Tony Bardach
- Ian Tiles

Past

- Robert Bruce
- Ken Montgomery
- Johnny Ferreira
- Scott Watson

== Discography ==
Studio albums

- Perfect Youth (1980)
- Three Lefts Make a Right (2009)
- Pointed Sticks (2015)
- Beautiful Future (2022)

Compilations

- Part of the Noise (1995)
- Waiting for the Real Thing (2006)
- Stiff Sessions Japan only (2008)
