= Sudden Death Records =

- Founded: 1978
- Founder: Joey Shithead
- Genre: Punk
- Country of origin: Canada
- Location: Vancouver, British Columbia
- Official website: suddendeath.com

Sudden Death Records is a Vancouver, British Columbia based record label run by Joe "Shithead" Keithley, frontman of D.O.A.

Sudden Death Records arrived in Canada's burgeoning punk scene in 1978. Keithley formed the label to release his D.O.A.'s album Disco Sucks.

It was only a part-time label until 1998, when they began to expand further into punk rock music. In keeping with the "Do It Yourself" attitude of its founder Joe Keithley, Sudden Death Records remained a friend to smaller musicians while keeping multi-national record conglomerates at bay. In doing so, they have earned themselves the respect of numerous luminaries within the music industry.

Today, Sudden Death Records remains a popular label and have branched off into other areas of music, focusing not only on punk but also ska, rock, pop and other genres.

== Artists ==
- Agriculture Club
- Geoff Berner
- Carmaig de Forest
- d.b.s.
- The Damned
- Dog Eat Dogma
- D.O.A.
- Ese
- Ford Pier
- The Honeymans
- Joe Keithley
- The Jolts
- JP5
- Karen Foster (band)
- MDC
- Modernettes
- Mojo Nixon
- Once Just
- Potbelly
- Portrait of Poverty
- Pigment Vehicle
- Pointed Sticks
- Real McKenzies
- Ripcordz
- Round Eye
- Schulz
- Sham 69
- Thor
- The Vibrators
- Vice Squad
- Young Canadians

== See also ==
- List of record labels
