= Joe Keithley =

Canadian musician and politician (born 1956)

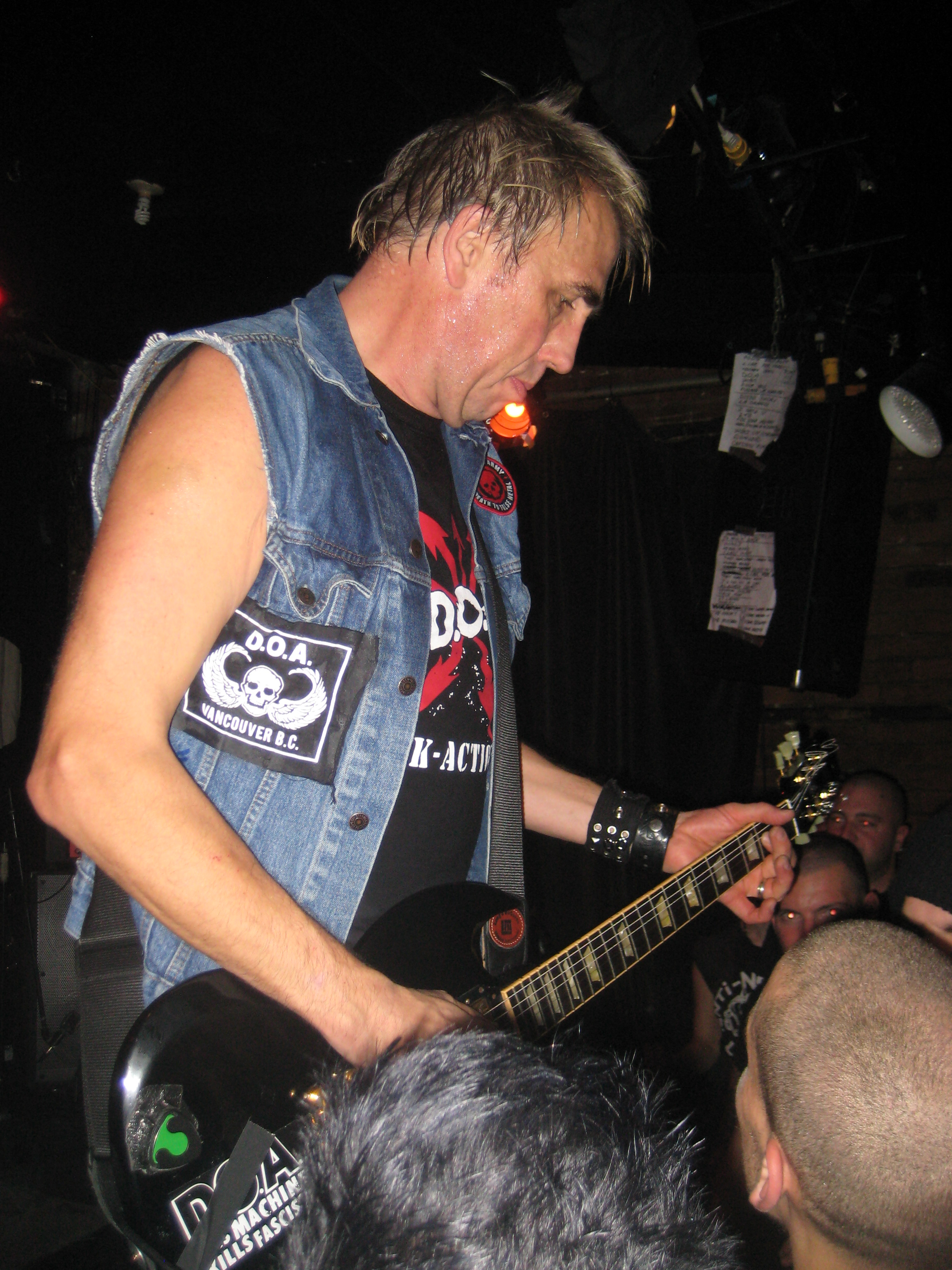
- Keithley playing in Montreal with D.O.A. in 2010

Burnaby City Councillor
- Incumbent
- Assumed office November 5, 2018

Personal details
- Born: Joseph Edward Keighley; June 3, 1956 (age 70) Burnaby, British Columbia, Canada
- Party: Burnaby Citizens Association
- Other political affiliations: Burnaby Green Party (2018–2025); BC Greens (2017)
- Occupation: Singer, songwriter, politician Musical career
- Also known as: Joey Shithead
- Genres: Punk rock, hardcore punk
- Instruments: Vocals, guitar, drums
- Years active: 1977–present
- Label: Sudden Death Records

Joseph Edward "Joey Shithead" Keithley (né Keighley; June 3, 1956) is a Canadian punk musician who is best known as the lead guitarist and vocalist of the punk band DOA. He was elected a city councillor in Burnaby, British Columbia, in the 2018 municipal elections as a member of the Burnaby Green Party and was re-elected in the 2022. As of 2025, he sits on council as a member of the Burnaby Citizens Association.

== Early life ==
Joe Keithley was raised in Burnaby, British Columbia, and attended Burnaby North Secondary. At age 11, he began playing drums after being inspired by a drummer in a jazz band at his sister's wedding. Keithley recalls his father's chagrin at Keithley "banging on a kit of his own", describing his father as "super square... completely right wing". He would later take up the guitar and vocals, with some of his classmates becoming his bandmates.

In 1972, in light of the ongoing Vietnam War and the American's planned testing of nuclear weapons off the coast of Alaska's Amchitka Island, 16 year old Keithley and 300 fellow students participated in a school walkout to join a protest organized by Greenpeace. Since then, music and activism have been "fused at the center of Keithley's life".

== Musical career ==
In 1977, Keithley, along with Chuck Biscuits' older brother, started a band called the Skulls. After the breakup of the Skulls, Keithley formed D.O.A. with Biscuits.

In 2004, he published the autobiography I, Shithead: A Life in Punk. He was inducted into the Canadian Independent Music Hall of Fame the same year. He has also done solo work, releasing a mix of music and spoken word. In 1999, he released his first solo record, Beat Trash. This was followed by "Band of Rebels" in 2007.

Keithley appeared in the punk/cult film Terminal City Ricochet, as well as contributing music (through D.O.A.) to the soundtrack. He and D.O.A. appeared in Bruce McDonald's 1995 cult film Hard Core Logo. He was interviewed for a documentary titled Let's All Hate Toronto, produced by Elevator Films and published by The Disinformation Company. In 2006, Keithley was featured prominently in the feature-length documentary American Hardcore. Keithley was also featured in the 2010 documentary Open Your Mouth And Say... Mr. Chi Pig, a film that looks at the life of Mr. Chi Pig of SNFU, directed by Sean Patrick Shaul and produced by Prairie Coast Films.

In 2008, The Vancouver Sun newspaper named Keithley one of British Columbia's most influential people of all time.

During D.O.A.'s 2011 Canadian tour, in three of the 10 cities where D.O.A appeared, Keithley gave free solo acoustic performances in support of the Occupy Wall Street protests, namely Occupy Ottawa, Occupy Regina and Occupy Vancouver.

He owns and operates his own record company, Sudden Death Records. The recording company was started in 1978 as a DIY response to lack of interest from major labels. His motto is 'TALK-ACTION=ZERO.'

== Politics ==
D.O.A. is known for playing in peace rallies and environmental events. Keithley has been increasingly interested in politics, saying that shows where he can make a difference are more rewarding. While studying at the University of British Columbia, he planned to become a labor lawyer, but found music irresistible. In 1996 and 2001, Keithley ran in the British Columbia provincial elections for the Green Party of British Columbia. In 2001, he received the highest percentage of the vote next to party leader Adriane Carr. He ran for the Burnaby-Lougheed seat in the 2017 British Columbia provincial election. On October 20, 2018, he was elected for Burnaby City Council in the 2018 municipal elections as a member of the Burnaby Green Party.

On December 15, 2025, Keithley announced that he was switching parties and joining the Burnaby Citizens Association. He ran with the party in the 2026 municipal election and topped the polls for reelection.

=== Electoral record ===
2017 British Columbia general election: Burnaby-Lougheed
Party	Candidate	Votes	%	±%	Expenditures
New Democratic	Katrina Chen	10,911	48.06	+3.80	$74,356.10
Liberal	Steve Darling	8,391	36.96	−3.63	$71,973.42
Green	Joe Keithley	3,127	13.77	+5.54	$8,745.26
Independent	Sylvia Gung	145	0.64	–	$87.90
Libertarian	Neeraj Murarka	129	0.57	–	$329.94
Total valid votes		22,703	100.00	–	
Total rejected ballots		188	0.82	−0.29	
Turnout		22,891	60.81	+4.57	
Registered voters		37,641			
Source: Elections BC

== Books ==
- I, Shithead: A Life in Punk (Arsenal Pulp Press)
- Talk-Action=0: An Illustrated History of D.O.A. (Arsenal Pulp Press)

== See also ==
- Justin Brannan, American punk musician and politician
