= PeaceOUT World Homo Hop Festival =

- Genre: Hip hop music, LGBT
- Location: Oakland, California
- Inaugurated: 2001
- Founder: Pete King
- Most recent: 2007

The PeaceOUT (World) Homo Hop Festival was an annual festival of hip hop music and culture created by Lesbian, Gay, Bisexual, and Transgender (LGBT) people from 2001 to 2007. The main festival took place in Oakland, California, although sibling festivals were also held in New York City, Atlanta and London.

== History ==
The festival was first held in August 2001 (and was known as "Cypher") as a part of the East Bay (Oakland) LGBT Pride, following the suggestion of East Bay (Oakland) Pride organizer Pete King. Though King was not a fan of hip hop music or culture, he was familiar with the numerous out queer hip hop artists performing in the San Francisco Bay Area and felt the growing scene was an important component of the LGBT arts community. In June 2001, King approached Juba Kalamka of the group Deep Dickollective about his ideas (including naming the event "PeaceOUT") and inquired as to the possibility of organizing the event.

Though at first reticent as a result of what he viewed as racial and class antagonism toward hip hop at mainstream pride events, Kalamka eventually relented, which led to the organization of "Cypher 2000:One" by his Deep Dickollective bandmate Tim'm West and London-based DJ Christopher "Mister Maker" Harvey, who founded the Gayhiphop.com website in 2000.

The success of the event led to plans to create a larger scale event in 2002. East Bay Pride sponsored the event until its own dissolution after PeaceOUT 2003, at which time main financial sponsorship and organization was coordinated by Kalamka's micro-label Sugartruck Recordings and Matt Wobensmith of the zine and record label Outpunk and later the Queercorps imprint.

Among the performers who appeared at the festival were Deep Dickollective, Katastrophe, Tori Fixx, God-des and She, Deadlee, Jen-Ro, Jaycub Perez, Cazwell and soce, the elemental wizard. Numerous performances from the festival are featured in the documentary film Pick Up the Mic, which premiered at the 2005 Toronto International Film Festival on September 11, 2005.

Despite initial plans to continue with PeaceOUT as a biannual event following the 2007 festival, Kalamka decided to close the event permanently in July 2008. The official website is currently maintained as a permanent historical archive of the festival.
