= Pick Up the Mic =

- Film poster
- Directed by: Alex Hinton
- Produced by: Alan Skinner
- Cinematography: Alex Hinton
- Edited by: Alex Hinton; Alan Skinner
- Release date: 2006
- Running time: 95 minutes
- Country: United States
- Language: English

Pick Up the Mic is a documentary film, released in 2006, which profiles the underground homo hop scene, which is a subgenre of hip hop that includes gay, lesbian, bisexual and transgender artists. The film was directed by Alex Hinton.

The documentary had its premiere at the 2005 Toronto International Film Festival. Subsequently, the film screened at other film festivals around the world. An edited version aired nationally in the United States on the Logo cable television channel.

Though homophobia is a phenomenon commonly laid at the feet of mainstream hip hop, pop culture's relationship to it has also been shaped by white middle class LGBT communities' covert and overt racism and internalized homophobia.

As a result, the attendant conversations in LGBT and straight mainstream media around the subject tend to gravitate toward the speculative (Queen Pen's 1998 single "Your Girlfriend") and the apocryphal (the brief career of self-proclaimed "gay rapper" Caushun, who was the subject of a flurry of mainstream press from 2001 to 2003, yet failed to release an album or single through his reported record deal with Kimora Lee Simmons' Baby Phat imprint).

Homohop is a growing subgenre of aggressive pro-gay lyrics directly confronting the perceived homophobia of mainstream rap. It is a significant underground gay hip hop movement, spearheaded by many of the artists profiled in Pick Up the Mic. The performance footage in the documentary was shot at the PeaceOUT World Homo Hop Festival in Oakland, California between 2002 and 2004, and Peace Out East, a sister festival in New York City curated by Judge "Dutchboy" Muscat and Shante "Paradigm" Smalls. All of the artists featured in Pick Up the Mic have released multiple independent recordings and have toured the United States and internationally over the past several years. Katastrophe, Deep Dickollective and Scream Club have been among the most prolific, with the Scream Club making several tours across Europe in recent years, where they have developed a cult-like following.

== Artists ==
- Juba Kalamka
- Deep Dickollective
- Dutchboy
- Tori Fixx
- Deadlee
- Tim'm T. West
- JB Rap
- JenRO
- Katastrophe
- Marcus Rene Van
- Miss Money
- Paradigm
- Aggracyst
- QBoy
- Cazwell
- Johnny Dangerous
- God-Des
- Tina G (aka She of God-Des and She)
- Scream Club
- Soce, the elemental wizard

== See also ==
- Banjee
