= LGBTQ representation in hip-hop =

LGBTQ hip-hop
- Stylistic origins: West Coast hip-hop, queer theory, third wave feminism, pop-rap, bounce music
- Cultural origins: 1990s in the United States

Other topics
- Progressive rap

LGBTQ representation in hip-hop music has existed since the birth of the genre even while enduring blatant discrimination. Due to its adjacency to disco, the earliest days of hip-hop had a close relation to LGBTQ subcultures, and multiple LGBTQ DJs have played a role in popularizing hip-hop. Since the early 2000s there has been a flourishing community of LGBTQ hip-hop artists, activists, and performers breaking barriers in the mainstream music industry. Despite this early involvement, hip-hop has long been portrayed as one of the least LGBTQ-friendly genres of music, with a significant body of the genre containing homophobic views and anti-gay lyrics, with mainstream artists such as Eminem (who supports LGBT rights) and Tyler, the Creator (whose own sexuality has been repeatedly questioned throughout his career) having used casual homophobia in their lyrics, including usages of the word faggot. Attitudes towards homosexuality in hip-hop culture have historically been negative, with slang that uses homosexuality as a punchline such as "sus", "no homo", and "pause" being heard in hip-hop lyrics from some of the industry's biggest artists.

Labels such as homo hop or queer hip-hop group all artists identifying as members of the LGBTQ community into a subgenre of hip-hop based solely on their sexuality. These subgenre labels are not marked by any specific production style, as artists within it may simultaneously be associated with virtually any other subgenre of hip-hop, or may also make music that falls outside the subgenre entirely. Rather, the terms are defined by a direct engagement with LGBTQ culture in elements such as the lyrical themes or the artist's visual identity and presentation.

Artists who have been labelled as part of the genre have varied in their acceptance of the terminology. Some have supported the identification of a distinct phenomenon of "LGBTQ hip-hop" as an important tool for promoting LGBTQ visibility in popular music, while others have criticized it for trivializing their music as a "niche" interest that circumscribed their appeal to mainstream music fans.

Many artists have contributed to the increased visibility and social acceptance of the LGBTQ community's presence in hip-hop music, most notably Frank Ocean, who penned an open letter addressing his sexuality in 2012. There has also been an increased presence of LGBTQ supporters in the mainstream hip-hop community, including Eminem, Jay-Z, Murs, Kanye West, XXXTentacion, Jack Harlow, Kendrick Lamar, Macklemore, and Ryan Lewis.

== History ==
=== Origins (1970s) ===
Hip-hop was developed in the late 1970s following the popularity of disco. Disco music, which contains origins within Black American culture, had an impact on hip-hop from samples to early hip-hop fashion. The disco scene which was derived from disco music was known for its vibrant nightlife that was considered a haven for those in the LGBTQ community, particularly LGBTQ youth of color.

Despite these origins, early hip-hop artists expressed anti-LGBTQ sentiments and epithets common of the time in their music. Sugarhill Gang's 1979 song "Rapper's Delight", the first hip-hop record to become a top 40 hit, referred to fictional character Superman as a "fairy" for wearing a skin-tight garment.

Soon after the rise of hip-hop in New York, the LA-based openly gay rap group Age of Consent performed their song "Fight Back", an anthem against gay-bashing, at a live rap event in 1981, referring to themselves as "faggot rap" and encouraging other members of the queer community to "fight back" when faced with queer bashing.

=== 1980s–1990s ===
In 1986, the hip-hop trio Beastie Boys originally wanted to name their debut album Don't Be A Faggot. Their record label Columbia Records refused to release it under that title, so it changed the title to Licensed to Ill. Years later, the Beastie Boys formally apologized to the LGBTQ community for the "shitty and ignorant" things they said on their first record.

During what was considered third-wave feminism, there was an infusion of Black feminist thought into hip-hop by way of Black women in the genre who emphasized issues of race, gender, and sexuality. This included black LGBTQ musicians like Meshell Ndegeocello whose 1993 album Plantation Lullabies is considered an example of the evolving attitudes and politics of the hip-hop generation, specifically from younger black feminists. According to Andreana Clay, "Ndegeocello's lyrics are a product of early Black feminism, radical lesbian feminism, and hip-hop feminism."

In her music, Ndegocello has addressed sexuality and blackness as a black bisexual woman, garnering a following from LGBTQ feminists of color. Her musical content and appearance also drew criticism from certain listeners and radio stations who refused to play her music. The ideas of black queer and lesbian feminism influenced hip-hop during a moment when politics surrounding sexuality, gender, and race were shifting.

Although more radical queer politics were influencing more mainstream areas of music and society, discrimination remained and LGBTQ artists continued to face marginalization and barriers in airtime and commercial success.

=== 2000s–present ===
In August 2005, Kanye West denounced homophobia in hip-hop in an interview with Sway Calloway for MTV News. He discussed how his environment led him to be homophobic, and how finding out his cousin was gay changed his perspective. This statement was radical at the time; it was the first major statement against homophobia in hip-hop by a popular artist.

Further advancements in acceptance of LGBTQ in hip-hop took place through the mid-2010s and the 2020s.

In 2012, the Filipino rapper Gloc-9 released the song "Sirena", whose lyrics are a first-person story of a gay man ("bakla") who was initially abused and ostracised by his father for his effeminacy, but reconciled with each other when his father suffered from cancer. In a 2024 interview, Gloc-9 dedicated the song to his son, who came out as gay in 2022.

In 2014, rap duo Macklemore and Ryan Lewis joined the United Nations Free & Equal campaign, which aims to advantage equal rights for LGBTQ people around the world.

In 2017, rapper XXXTentacion spoke out during his concert tour against discrimination towards gay people by hate groups, and was praised as a supporter of transgender rights by multiple transgender artists.

In 2018, rapper Eminem made headlines when he apologized for the first time in his career for previously using homophobic slurs, saying that he now realized "[he] was hurting a lot of other people by saying it." Specifically, Eminem said he regretted calling rapper Tyler, the Creator a "faggot" in his diss track, "Fall".

In 2022, rapper Kendrick Lamar received mixed reactions after he released his song "Auntie Diaries", with some praising the track for being pro-LGBTQ. Others criticized Lamar's delivery within the song, as he at some points deadnames his relatives' pronouns and uses the word "faggot". Lamar recalls at the end of the song a previous performance in which he brought out a white female fan to perform his song with him but disapproved of her usage of the word "nigga" because she was not black, to critique himself as a hypocrite for using the word "faggot" when he is not gay. He says, "Faggot, faggot, faggot, we can say it together / But only if you let a white girl say nigga".

== Homo hop ==
In the 1990s, the homo hop movement emerged as an underground movement spearheaded by the hip-hop group Rainbow Flava, particularly in California, in part as a reaction to the widespread acceptance of homophobia in the lyrics of mainstream hip-hop performers such as Eminem. Lyrics in songs such as "Criminal" on The Marshall Mathers LP demonstrate this homophobia. Initially coined by Tim'm T. West of Deep Dickollective, the term "homo hop" was not meant to signify a distinct genre of music, but simply to serve as a community building tool and promotional hook for LGBTQ artists. According to West:

It reflected an effort to give credence to a subgenre of hip hop that the mainstream was ignoring. It's not a different kind of hip hop, but places identity at the center of production, which is a blessing and curse. I'm a hip hop artist, ultimately, who happens to be queer. Homo Hop, as a mobilizing medium for queer artists, did, in fact, serve a purpose, initially.

West's bandmate Juba Kalamka offered a similar assessment:

Should there be a separate term for female emcees like femcee? Or ones like gangsta? Crunk? Trap music? Snap? Africentrist? Conscious? Whatever. In many cases the terms get created or reappropriated by people because they need something to make them stand out, or to validate their cultural or social space. 'Homohop,' like any other subcultural subgenre designation, gave and still gives a listener or fan something to grab onto. The first person I heard say 'homohop' was my former bandmate Tim'm West in the context of an interview in 2001...and even then it was a big joke, totally tongue-in-cheek. If you called it 'Fruit Rollup,' people would be saying that now.

In a 2001 interview with SFGate.com, West elaborated on the movement's goals:

Ideally, queer hip-hop can create changes. It can be the critical check for all the negative aspects that have come out of the culture in the last few years. You won't be able to assume there isn't a faggot in the room; you won't be able to assume there isn't a feminist in the room. Hip-hop will be different because we decided to participate in it openly and with honor.

The genre received a mainstream publicity boost in 2002 and 2003 when Caushun was widely reported as the first openly LGBTQ rapper to be signed to a major label, although Caushun was later revealed to have been a publicity stunt engineered by heterosexual musician Ivan Matias.

Notable events in the 2000s included the PeaceOUT World Homo Hop Festival, which was founded in 2001 and mounted annually until 2008, and the 2006 documentary film Pick Up the Mic. However, some music critics in this era dismissed the genre as too often sacrificing musical quality in favour of a "didactic" political agenda.

The most commercially successful LGBTQ rapper in the 2000s was Cazwell, who emerged as a popular artist in gay dance clubs, and has scored at least six top 40 hits on Billboard's Hot Dance Club Songs chart, with a hybrid pop-rap style which he has described as "if Biggie Smalls ate Donna Summer for breakfast". Cazwell described his philosophy of music as "create your own space, your own music and have people come to you," and has noted in interviews that he achieved much greater success by "breaking" the rules of the hip-hop industry than he ever did in his earlier attempts to pursue mainstream success with the 1990s hip-hop duo Morplay.

One of the first mainstream artists to speak out publicly against anti-gay discrimination in hip-hop was Kanye West in a 2005 interview with Sway Calloway on MTV News. In the interview Kanye says, "Hip-hop does discriminate against gay people. I want to just come on TV and tell my rappers, my friends, just stop it, fam. Seriously, that's really discrimination". Kanye criticized the hip-hop community, saying, "Hip-hop seemed like it was about fighting for your rights in the beginning, about speaking your mind, and breaking down barriers or whatever, but everybody in hip-hop discriminates against gay people. To me, that's one of the standards in hip-hop is to be like, 'You fag, you gay'".

=== Criticism ===
Some artists have criticized the queer hip-hop genre as an arbitrary label that can potentially limit an artist's audience and may not actually correspond to their artistic goals or career aspirations. In 2013, Brooke Candy told The Guardian:

What is so bothersome to me, with these emerging gay rappers, is that they've created a new genre called 'queer hip-hop'. Why the fuck is there a new genre for the same-sounding music? Half of the people rapping up there are gay and people don't even know it.

One unspecified artist declined to be interviewed for the Guardian feature at all, stating that he preferred to be known as a rapper rather than as a "gay rapper". Eric Shorey, author of "Queer Rap is Not Queer Rap", contests "queer rap" labeling, arguing that "comparisons between gay and straight rap (as if they were two distinct genres) simply doesn't make sense without implied bigotry". Shorey insists that listeners ignore these sexuality-based hip-hop classifications and listen more closely to the quality of music being produced. He also suggests that queer artists should be booked alongside straight artists, showing that they are equally talented, and deserve the same amount of recognition.

Other artists don't mind these classifications. British rapper RoxXxan told the Guardian that "I want to be perceived as 'RoxXxan,' but if people label me as 'gay rapper RoxXxan' I'm not offended." Nicky Da B told Austinist that "Basically, I perform for an LGBTQ crowd but also for everyone. A lot of the bounce rappers that are rapping and touring at the moment are all gay. The LGBTQ community just capitalizes on that I guess, from us being gay, and they support us on it, so that's how it goes I guess."

=== Commercialization ===
Andre Benjamin, primarily known as André 3000 in hip-hop duo OutKast, has also been noted to wear clothing considered "androgynous" or "gender-bending" while performing as he would be seen in bright, colorful pieces traditionally seen worn by women. His presence in the traditionally masculine genre was seen as one of the few exceptions within the culture, but not without speculations circulating around the music industry about whether or not he was actually straight. In 2008, Andre was quoted at the debut of his men's wear fashion line addressing the opinions of his clothing choices told by Observer:

People feel like, just because you like to dress well ... that don't mean you're gay! I don't know where that came from!

While Andre 3000 has shown his growth of support to the LGBTQ community over the years, his presence in the hip-hop community has served as a reminder that queerness is used as an aesthetic while queer-identifying people in the hip-hop community are degraded or forced to stay behind-the-scenes. As for openly queer artists part of the hip-hop genre, Lil Nas X faced backlash in 2021 for the music video made for his song "Montero (Call Me by Your Name)" with most of the controversy coming from parents along with religious organizations claiming the video was "inappropriate" and "harmful" considering he has built a fanbase of younger children since his release of the song "Old Town Road". Lil Nas X has publicly shared the purpose of the music video is to openly embrace his sexuality while making the effort to bring awareness to the oppressive culture towards the LGBTQ community. The artist took to twitter to further address the controversy while also sharing a letter to his 14-year old self describing his coming-out journey:

Dear 14 year old Montero, I wrote a song with our name in it. It's about a guy I met last summer. I know we promised to never come out publicly, I know we promised to never be "that" type of gay person, I know we promised to die with the secret, but this will open doors for many other queer people to simply exist. You see this is very scary for me, people will be angry, they will say I'm pushing an agenda. But the truth is, I am. The agenda to make people stay the fuck out of other peoples lives and stop dictating who they should be. sending you love from the future.

Other notable artists, such as Fly Young Red, Azealia Banks, Angel Haze, and Young M.A. have openly discussed their sexuality in their lyrics and expression of style further opening the narrative for LGBTQ representation in popular music.

== Negative representation of women and homosexuality ==
Gender and sexual diversity among hip-hop artists have existed since the genre's earliest days, yet it has historically and predominantly been perceived as the epitomized expression of Black straight male masculinity and culture, which are usually externalized as the degradation of women and homosexuality within the music and personified as a lifestyle outside the music. In his 2006 documentary Hip-Hop: Beyond Beats and Rhymes, Byron Hurt explores the nuanced relationships between hip-hop, masculinity, misogyny, and homophobia. In the documentary Hurt travels around the country and interviews rap and hip-hop artists, academics, and fans about their perceptions on these issues in the culture. After conducting dozens of interviews, Hurt sees a continued pattern of homophobia, the objectification of women, and the domination of other men, all linked as the means through which one asserts their masculinity over another.

Lauron J. Kehrer writes extensively on the prevalence and issues of misogyny/misogynoir and homophobia/lesbophobia faced by queer women hip-hop artists in Queer Voices in Hip Hop: Cultures, Communities, and Contemporary Performance. The construction of this specific masculinity in hip-hop has made it difficult for artists who don't fit the stereotypical image of a hyper-masculine straight male to succeed. Some scholars have attempted to categorize different types of female hip-hop artists as a means of increasing their representation within the genre, such as Cheryl L. Keyes' formulation of the "Queen Mother", "Fly Girl", "Sista with Attitude" and "Lesbian" rapper archetypes in Empowering Self, Making Choices, Creating Spaces: Black Female Identity via Rap Music Performance.

Some successful female artists, such as Nicki Minaj, have attempted to make space within the male-dominated genre by aligning themselves with stereotypical black, hypermasculine hip-hop traits in their music and performance. Another female artist, Jean Grae, subverts the Black straight hypermasculine male status quo by utilizing the language and lyrical presentation of male artists in the industry, as Shante Paradigm Smalls discusses in The Rain Comes Down: Jean Grae and Hip Hop Heteronormativity. In Getting Freak with Missy: Missy Elliott, Queer Hip Hop, and the Musical Aesthetics of Impropriety, Elliott H. Powell discusses in detail the approach some female artists, such as Missy Elliott, take in hypersexualizing themselves and engaging in 'impropriety' to make space in the genre by centering herself and her sexuality over that of the male subject.

However, Kehrer points out that all of the above examples "challenge but [do] not necessarily disrupt the status quo" of the black, hypermasculine straight male within hip-hop, unlike black queer masculine female artists. The specific brand of female masculinity which these female artists embody is neither temporarily clad for performance nor is it undermined by heterosexuality or a traditional femininity. The categorization of female artists along the lines of Keyes' conceptualization, and the fact that black queer masculine female artists disrupt the status quo in hip-hop in the way Kehrer describes, both contribute to the hypervisibility/invisibility paradox that such artists face in the genre.

In his book Female Masculinity, Jack Halberstam writes that "widespread indifference to female masculinity...has clearly ideological motivations and has sustained the complex social structures that wed masculinity to maleness and to power and domination."

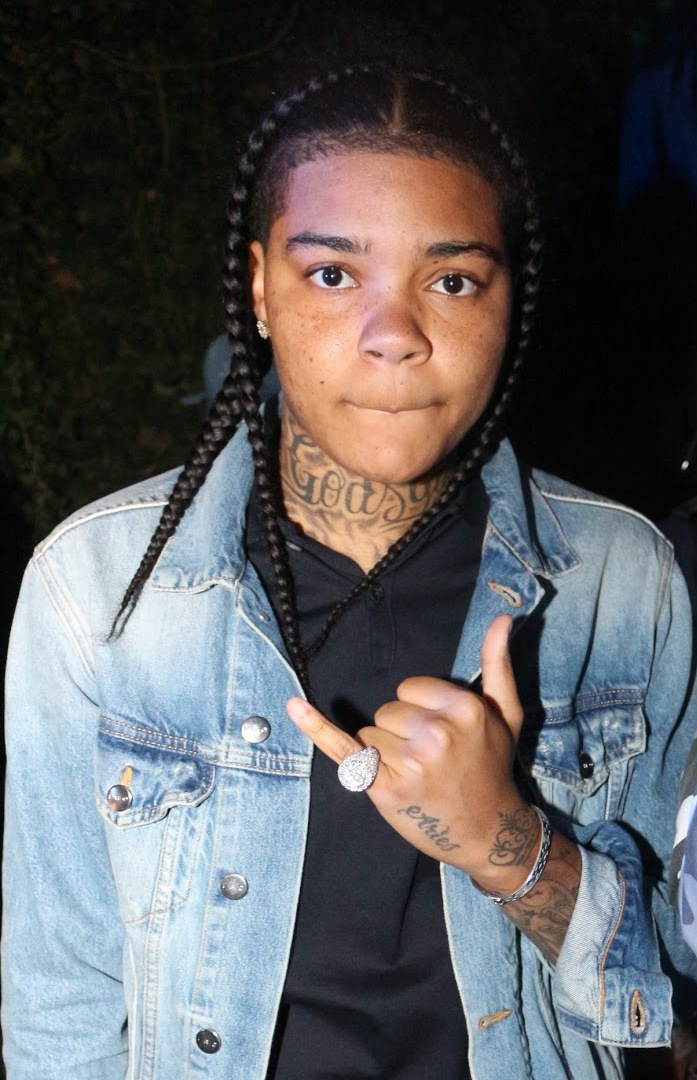
American rapper Young M.A. in 2018

Young M.A. is a prominent queer masculine rapper who exemplifies this dichotomy. As someone who embodies a natural female masculinity within the genre, her masculinity fits directly with the style of hip-hop such that she does not need to fit herself onto it like feminine or heterosexual female artists must. Because this female masculinity threatens the predominant black straight male hypermasculinity prevalent in hip-hop, M.A. is often the target of harassment and abuse by male artists who attempt to undermine her legitimacy as a hip-hop artist by sexualizing and objectifying her in the traditional ways feminine and heterosexual women often are.

To combat this dismissal of her sexuality (i.e., an attempt to make her queer identity invisible), as well as the paradoxical but simultaneous hypervisibility she receives as a queer masculine woman rapper that elicits this abuse in the first place, she distances herself from the labels "lesbian rapper" and "woman rapper." She thereby carves out a space within the industry for her to exist and succeed as a queer masculine woman rapper without succumbing to expectations that she performs within the restrictive category of homo hop, nor is she compelled to perform in the same way her feminine and heterosexual counterparts are expected to in order to be taken seriously as authentic hip-hop artists. As Kehrer writes: "The very delicate balance she achieves allows her queer identity to be seen while making it difficult for anyone to demand that she performs queerness on anyone else's terms but her own."

Syd, another queer masculine hip-hop artist, has received significant backlash from the LGBTQ community for her refusal to identify with the term "lesbian". In an interview for The Guardian, she explains, "I don't feel like a part of the gay community. Like, I don't consider myself a lesbian." She has also been criticized for her music video, "Cocaine," which is a cautionary commentary on the dangers of drug use, but which has been accused of depicting an abusive same-sex relationship between two women.

Some scholars argue that the criticisms Syd has experienced is a result of the unique tension between the cultural significance of the genre in Black culture and the homophobia which pervades the genre. This tension is exemplified by an example in Hurt's documentary, in which rapper Busta Rhymes walks out of his interview when he is asked a question about homophobia in the rap community, saying, "What I represent culturally doesn't condone [homosexuality] whatsoever."

Florida-born rapper Doechii, who identifies as a lesbian as of February 2026, has spoken out about the misogyny and homophobia she has faced. In a 2022 interview with GQ Magazine, she stated that "I always knew that I was queer, and I was bisexual. But I didn't really feel comfortable talking about it, because nobody around me was gay." However, she declares that she aims to use her platform to challenge those attitudes. Doechii's music often reflects her queer identity, feminism, and experiences growing up as a Black girl in Tampa.

== Controversy over homophobic lyrics ==
Ice-T stated on his autobiography that record-label executive Seymour Stein took exception to a line in his song "409": "Guys grab a girl, girls grab a guy / If a guy wants a guy, please take it outside". Ice-T later became one of the first rappers to condemn homophobia on songs such as "Straight Up Nigga" and "The Tower" on his album O.G. Original Gangster (1991).

Many songs by rapper Eminem have been considered homophobic for his frequent use of anti-gay slurs, especially the song "Criminal" from his third album The Marshall Mathers LP (2000), which contains lines like: "My words are like a dagger with a jagged edge, That'll stab you in the head, whether you're a fag or les', Or a homosex, hermaph or a trans-a-vest, Pants or dress, hate fags? The answer's 'yes'". In an interview with Anderson Cooper on 60 Minutes, Eminem denied being homophobic and explained the frequent use of the term "faggot" in his lyrics, stating that this word was "thrown around constantly" in battle rap, and that he does not use it to refer to gay people.

The Marshall Mathers LP was nominated for Album of the Year at the Grammy Awards 2001, which led to protests due to the album's controversial content. At the show, Eminem performed "Stan" with openly gay musician Elton John in response. Eminem experienced more backlash in 2018, after he released his surprise album Kamikaze. On December 11, 2017, rapper Tyler, The Creator tweeted "dear god this song is horrible sheesh how the fuck", which fans quickly realized was directed at Eminem's new single at the time, "Walk On Water". On the track "Fall" from Kamikaze, Eminem responded to Tyler, The Creator's criticisms, where he raps "Tyler create nothin', I see why you call yourself a faggot, bitch / It's not because you lack attention, it's because you worship D12's balls, you're sacrilegious", although, the slur was notably edited in the song and video.

This is most likely in relation to Tyler's sexuality being a major spectacle within his fanbase, with a lot of his lyrics hinting at homosexuality. Before the album was released, however, the slur was censored. Eminem joined Sway Calloway in a series of interviews after Kamikaze's release, where he explained that he regretted using the slur against Tyler. "In my quest to hurt him, I realized that I was hurting a lot of other people by saying it. At the time, I was so mad, it was just whatever...", "...it was one of the things I kept going back to, going 'I don't feel right with this.'" Justin Vernon, who provided the chorus for "Fall", publicly condemned Eminem's language on the song, tweeting "Was not in the studio for the Eminem track ... came from a session with BJ Burton and Mike Will. Not a fan of the message, it's tired. Asked them to change the track, wouldn't do it...". In 2020, Eminem released his album Music To Be Murdered By, in which he collaborated on a song with openly queer New York rapper Young M.A.

The early work of rapper Tyler, The Creator was heavily criticized for homophobic lyrics. Goblin, in particular, was found by publication NME to have used homophobic language 213 times throughout the album. One particular example was in the song "Tron Cat", where Tyler states: "Rashes on my dick from licks of shish-kebab sagets, in some Kanye West glasses screaming out, fuck faggots!" Tyler responded to these pieces in a later NME interview, stating: "I'm not homophobic. I just think 'faggot' hits and hurts people. It hits."

Tegan Rain Quin of Tegan and Sara took particular issue with Tyler's lyrics on Goblin: "If any of the bands whose records are held in similar esteem as Goblin had lyrics littered with rape fantasies and slurs, would they be labeled hate mongers? I realize I could ask that question of DOZENS of other artists, but is Tyler exempt because people are afraid of the backlash? The inevitable claim that detractors are being racist, or the brush-off that not 'getting it' would indicate that you're 'old' (or a faggot)?" Tyler responded in a joking matter with the quote, "If Tegan and Sara need some hard dick, hit me up!"

In 2020, rappers Insane Clown Posse denounced past use of homophobic slurs in their lyrics, saying that, "We wanted to be like gangsta rap, and gangsta rap said it all the time," but "There was never a time when we had a problem with gay people."

In the lyrics of one song on rapper Trick Trick's 2008 album The Villain, he refers to Ellen DeGeneres and Rosie O'Donnell as "dyke bitches" and says that he will send a "scud missile right through their fucking cruise ship". Trick Trick expressed his dislike towards homosexuals in an interview with music site AllHipHop: "Faggots hate me and I don't give a fuck. I don't want your faggot money any goddam way."

The phrase "No homo" is often used in today's hip-hop lyrics and black culture. It means "no gay things" or "nothing gay". One example of the term's usage is in the Jay-Z song, "Run This Town". Kanye West, one of the featured artists on the song, stated, "It's crazy how you can go from being Joe Blow / to everybody on your dick...no homo."

== Evolution ==
It's not a different kind of hip hop, but places identity at the center of production, which is a blessing and curse. I'm a hip hop artist, ultimately, who happens to be queer.

— Tim'm T. West

By the early 2010s, a new wave of openly LGBTQ hip-hop musicians began to emerge, spurred in part by the increased visibility and social acceptance of LGBTQ people, the coming out of mainstream hip-hop stars such as Azealia Banks and Frank Ocean, and the release of LGBTQ-positive songs by heterosexual artists such as Murs, Macklemore, and Ryan Lewis.

Although inspired and empowered by the homo hop movement, this newer generation of artists garnered more mainstream media coverage and were able to make greater use of social media tools to build their audience, and thus did not need to rely on the old homo hop model of community building. Many of these artists were also strongly influenced by the LGBTQ African American ball culture, an influence not widely seen in the first wave of homo hop, and many began as performance art projects and incorporated the use of drag. Accordingly, many of the newer artists were identified in media coverage with the newer "queer hip-hop" label instead of "homo hop".

In 2008, Jipsta released the single "Middle of the Dancefloor" which spent a total of 14 weeks (peaking at #6 for two consecutive weeks) on the Billboard Dance Club Play chart. This achievement was noteworthy for LGBTQ hip-hop as it marked the first time an openly gay White rapper earned a Top 10 single on the Billboard Club Play chart. The following year, Jipsta released a cover of the George Michael song "I Want Your Sex", which rose to the #4 position on the Billboard Dance Club Play chart in only 4 weeks time, resulting in the first Top 5 Billboard charting record by an LGBTQ hip-hop artist.

In March 2012, Carrie Battan of Pitchfork profiled Mykki Blanco, Le1f, Zebra Katz and House of Ladosha in an article titled "We Invented Swag: NYC Queer Rap" about "a group of NYC artists [who] are breaking down ideas of hip-hop identity".

In October 2012, Details profiled several LGBTQ hip-hop artists "indelibly changing the face—and sound—of rap". In the article, it discusses Frank Ocean, then member of the Odd Future collective. The California-born singer-rapper made waves when he came out as bisexual through an offhand missive on his Tumblr in July 2012. His revelation was seen as a significant moment for the LGBTQ community in hip-hop, and it helped pave the way for greater acceptance of queer artists in the industry.

In March 2014, New York rapper Le1f became the first openly-gay rapper to appear on The Late Show with David Letterman. During the performance, Le1f rapped "Wut," a popular track from his EP Hey, while accompanied by a group of backup dancers, producer Moody, and Blood Orange.

In March 2014, the online magazine Norient.com published a first overview of queer hip-hop videos worldwide. The article talks about topics, aesthetics and challenges of LGBTQ hip-hop in Angola, Argentina, Cuba, Germany, Israel, Serbia, South Africa and the USA."

Increasingly, focus on the development of queer voices in the international hip-hop community has gained more precedent with articles published looking at how Queer rappers use the art-form as a type of therapy. A Winter 2016 article from Bulletin of the Council for Research in Music Education looked at how utilizing the art-form helped challenge traditional notions of hip-hop and sexual identity.

In December 2016, Los Angeles-based rapper Thed Jewel, who raps "My skin is black, sexuality is Fuchsia" said: "There are a lot of rappers that are homosexuals and their day to be open with it will come one way or another".

In August 2018, openly gay member of Brockhampton, Kevin Abstract voiced his efforts to change hip-hop's issue with homophobia in an interview with the BBC by stating: "I have to exist in a homophobic space in order to make change and that homophobic space would be the hip-hop community. So me just existing and being myself is making change and making things easier for other young queer kids".

In June 2019, Lil Nas X, who performed the hit song "Old Town Road", took the opportunity to publicly come out during Pride Month, making him one of the most visible Black queer male singers to do so, especially in country or hip-hop genres, which emphasize machismo and "historically snubbed queer artists". Black queer male artists in hip-hop gaining mainstream acceptance are relatively new—preceding Nas X by less than a decade—including Frank Ocean (with his 2012 album Channel Orange), Tyler, the Creator, ILoveMakonnen, Brockhampton frontman Kevin Abstract and Steve Lacy. Black queer female artists have been accepted more readily; while the underground queer hip-hop movement goes back to the 1990s.

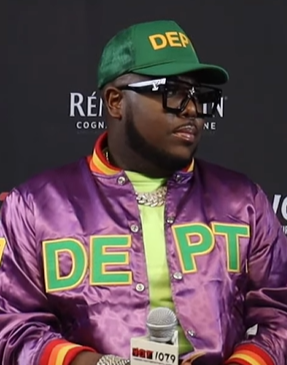
American rapper Saucy Santana in 2022

In 2021, Chicago rapper Kidd Kenn made history as the first openly queer rapper to be broadcast in the BET Hip Hop Awards' yearly cypher. During his performance, his lyrics unapologetically discussed the realities of being a Black queer person within the music industry, rapping: "Kenn going up is the only way, Benjamin is my only bae, eat me up like I be on a plate, they hella mad, I'm hella gay."

In June 2022, Teen Vogue covered American rapper Saucy Santana – who is both openly queer and feminine. In the interview, Santana discusses of his 2019 song "Material Girl", which ended up going viral on TikTok in late 2021. He also talks about his experience as a Black queer rapper, stating: "Before, I didn't want to be labeled a gay rapper," he recalls, "Then, in the middle of my career, I started to embrace it because I just felt like it was helpful to my culture and to my people."

== Notable artists ==
- 070 Shake
- Abdu Ali
- Angel Haze
- Anye Elite
- Backxwash
- Azealia Banks
- Bali Baby
- BbyMutha
- Big Dipper
- Big Freedia
- Big Momma
- Brooke Candy
- Cakes da Killa
- Cardi B
- Cazwell
- Mike E. Clark
- D. Smith
- Da Brat
- Deadlee
- Deep Dickollective
- Delli Boe
- D'Lo
- Doechii
- Doja Cat
- Drebae
- Drew Mason
- Fly Young Red
- Frank Ocean
- God-Des and She
- House of Ladosha
- Ice Spice
- ILoveMakonnen
- Isaiah Rashad
- Jai'Rouge
- Jane Remover
- Jay Dillinger (aka Marlon Williams)
- Jesse Dangerously
- Jipsta
- Jonny Makeup
- Jonny McGovern
- Juba Kalamka
- Katastrophe
- Kae Tempest
- Katey Red
- Kaytranada
- Kehlani
- Kevin Abstract
- Kidd Kenn
- K.Flay
- Pierre Kwenders
- Lady Sovereign
- Le1f
- Lil Nas X
- Lil Peep
- Lil Phag
- Lil Uzi Vert
- Lucas Charlie Rose
- Megan Thee Stallion
- Melange Lavonne
- Mista Strange
- Mykki Blanco
- Nicky da B
- Oliver Twixt
- ppcocaine
- Princess Nokia
- QBoy
- Queen Pen
- Rainbow Flava
- Rainbow Noise
- Rodney Chrome
- RoxXxan
- Samantha Ronson
- Saucy Santana
- Saul Williams
- Sissy Nobby
- Sasha Sathya
- Shorty Roc
- Snow Tha Product
- Soce, the elemental wizard
- Solomon
- Steve Lacy
- Syd tha Kid
- Taylor Bennett
- Tim'm T. West
- Titica
- Tori Fixx
- TT the Artist
- Tyler, the Creator
- Willow Smith
- Will Sheridan
- Xaviersobased
- Yo Majesty
- Young M.A.
- Zebra Katz

== See also ==
- African-American culture and sexual orientation
- Homophobia in ethnic minority communities
- LGBTQ representation in country music
- LGBTQ representation in jazz
- Misogyny in rap music
- Stop Murder Music
