= Camilo Arenivar =

American musician

Camilo Arenivar (left) and rapper Deadlee (right) in 2007.

Camilo Arenivar (born June 2, 1967) is an ordained minister who officiates weddings. Additional work included creation of the now defunct LGBT Hip Hop website, OutHipHop.com. He was the organizer and tour manager for the HomoRevolution Tour, the first ever organized road tour of LGBT hip hop artists which traveled to 10 cities in the southwestern United States. In 2009, he launched Big Milo Records, the first independent record label geared toward LGBT Hip Hop with distribution.

Arenivar has managed gay rappers such as Deadlee and Latino hip hop group, Salvimex, Tori Fixx in the past.

Arenivar has also been a movie reviewer blogging on his blog The Camilo Post as well as the popular rottentomatoes.com and on his site. He has also been a freelance journalist in the Los Angeles area for several years.
