= Throw That Boy Pussy =

2013 single by Fly Young Red

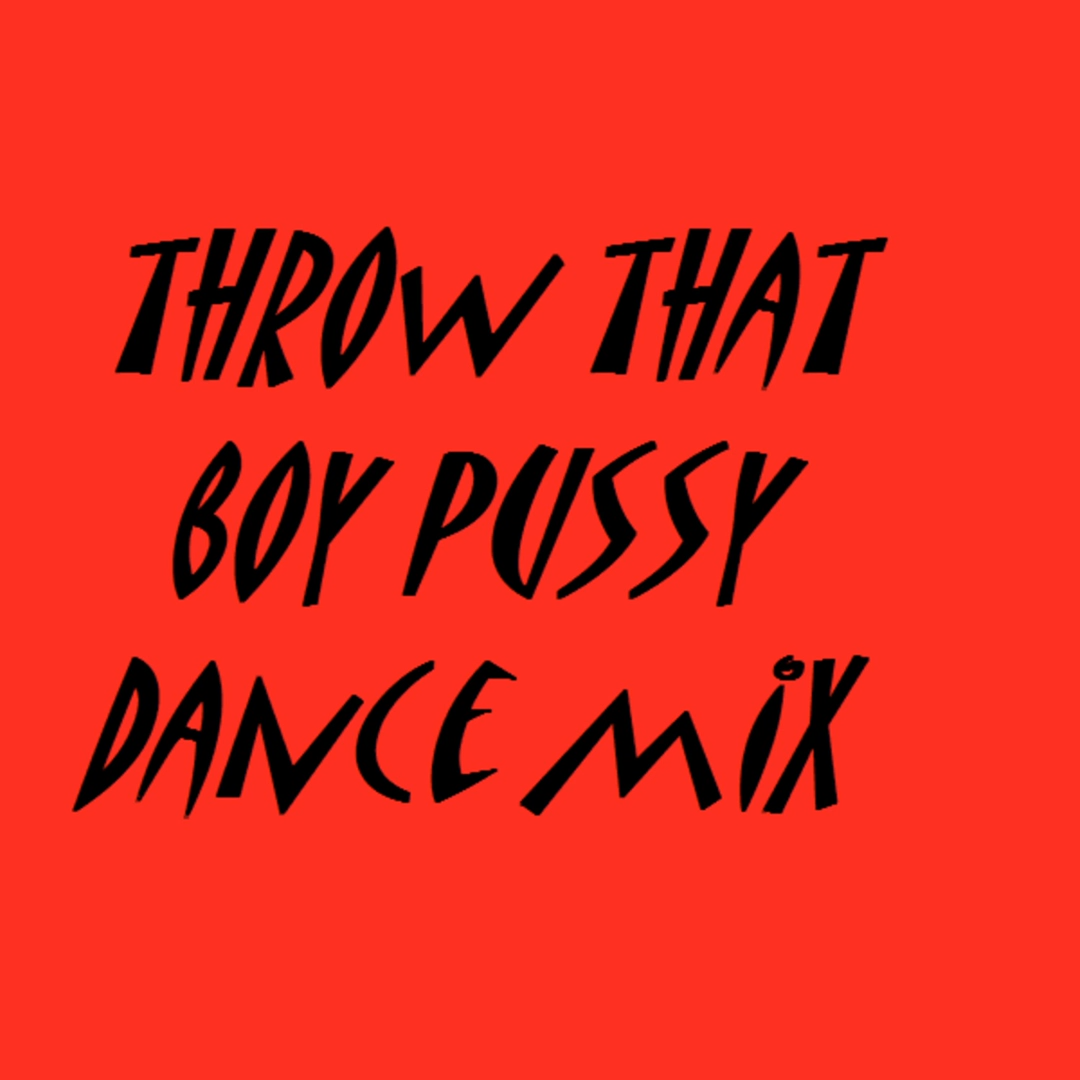
- Cover art

Single by Fly Young Red
- Released: September 20, 2013
- Recorded: 2013
- Genre: Homo hop; dirty rap
- Length: 3:42
- Songwriters: Lil Wayne; Trina; Fly Young Red; Aaron Hinton

"Throw That Boy Pussy" is a song performed by American rapper Fly Young Red, issued as a single in September 2013; with the music video premiering in March 2014. The song heavily references homosexual anilingus with many same gender sexual overtones. The song mainly samples Lil Wayne and Trina's "Wowzers" single also released in 2013.

== Music video ==
The video features male background dancers twerking in a nightclub with Fly Young Red and his friends watching on the other side of the bar drinking and complimenting the male dancers. The video was filmed in Club XL in Houston. Fly Young Red selected "Throw That Boy Pussy" as his first video release after observing view counts on some pre-release previews of songs from his album.

== Critical reception ==
The provocative lyrics have sparked debate over such social and sexual issues as creative freedom, sexism, and black gay culture. Darnell Moore has described the song as "honest, but not transformative", while Wade Davis has called it "revolutionary". It was plagued with controversy within the African American and hip hop community as the references to the song are not mainly what are associated with the culture.

Gawker described the song as "the new What What (In the Butt)", and said the song is destined to be a classic, while Dan Savage referred to it as an "anthem".

== See also ==
- "What What (In the Butt)"

General:

- LGBT hip hop
- African-American culture and sexual orientation
