= The Click List: Top 10 Videos =

The Click List: Top 10 Videos

The Click List: Top 10 Videos is an hour-long music video show that aired on the television channel Logo. Viewers vote for their top ten favorite videos online, and each week the winners are counted down in a new episode. An episode usually includes Indie and big label LGBT artists such as Rufus Wainwright, God-Des, Ari Gold, Deadlee, Scissor Sisters, Naked Highway, and Jonny McGovern. Mainstream artists like Madonna, Hilary Duff, Rihanna, and Justin Timberlake have also made the list.

A few special editions of The Click List: Top 10 Videos have aired in the past, including The Click List: Ultimate Madonna Videos and The Click List: Ultimate Comebacks. The videos for Vogue by Madonna and Believe by Cher were voted into the number one spots, respectively.
