= Anye Elite =

American singer

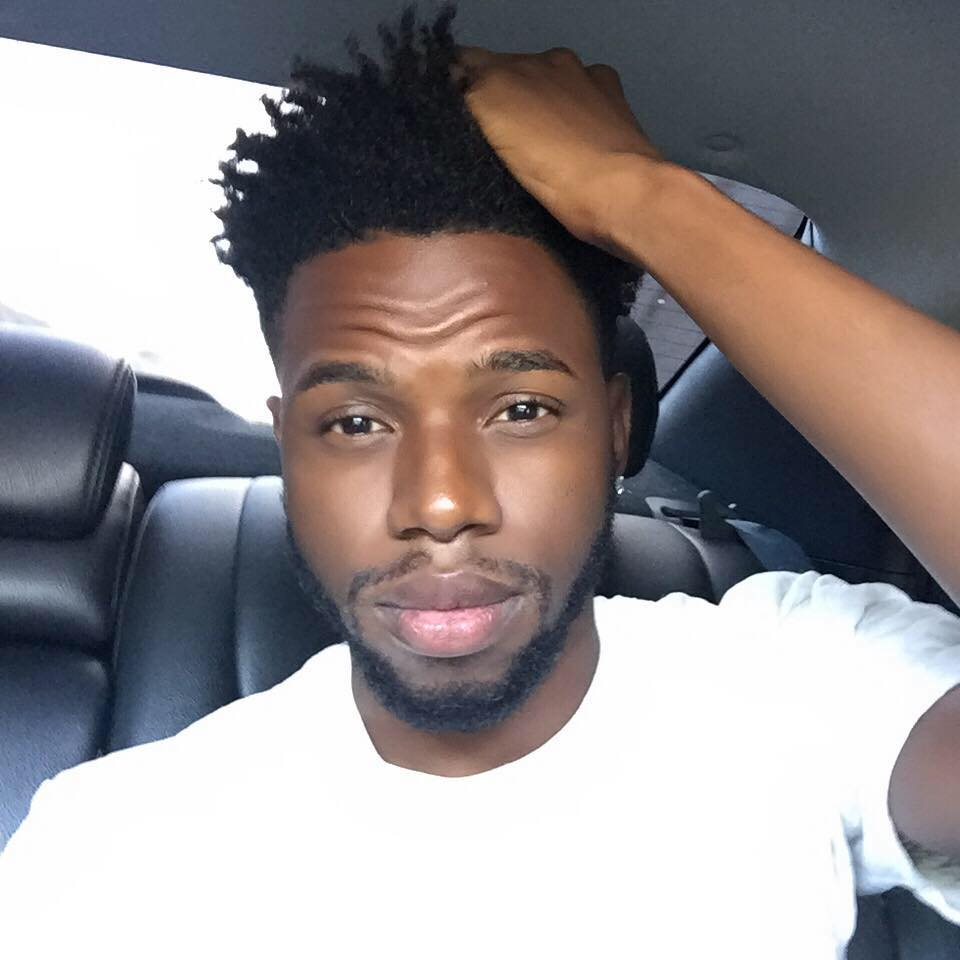

Background information
- Also known as: Anye Elite, Anye Ellis
- Born: August 31, 1987 (age 38); Philadelphia, Pennsylvania, U.S.
- Origin: Atlanta, Georgia, U.S. by way of Daytona, Florida, U.S.
- Genres: Pop, R&B, dance, Latin
- Occupations: Singer, rapper, activist
- Years active: 2009−present
- Label: Ellis Island
- Website: iconcity.net

Anye Elite (born August 31, 1987) is an American singer, rapper and LGBT activist. He is best known for his contributions to Atlanta's gay community.

== Early life ==
Elite was born to an African-American mother, Robin Monique Ellis, and an Afro-Dominican father, Bruce Jonathan Perry. Growing up Elite had little contact with his father. His mother's drug abuse led Philadelphia's department of human services to place him into the custody of his maternal grandfather, Cornelius Ellis. Elite began singing and community organizing relatively early in his life, ages 7 and 16 respectively. On August 31, 1993, Elite's seventh birthday, his grandfather purchased his first cassette tape, Mariah Carey's Music Box. During a chaotic childhood Elite found strength in the lyric's message of perseverance. Inspired by Carey's voice and songwriting abilities, Elite began writing and singing his own music. At sixteen, and in high school, he became Mainland High School's first openly gay homecoming king and around the same time began working with regional community improvement campaigns.

== Music career ==
In 2003, Elite started his student career at Philadelphia High School for Creative and Performing Arts in South Philadelphia, before relocating to the southern United States where he continued performing and writing. In 2004, Elite began singing in central Florida nightclubs. The Other Place, The Groove, and Zeba are all Daytona area clubs that Elite frequently played. He has also featured at Orlando's Parliament House. In late 2006, Elite relocated to Atlanta, Georgia, and began working on his debut album GAY 101. Due to a promotional tour of the black gay pride circuit that included Boston's New England Black Gay Pride, Houston Splash, and Jacksonville Black Pride. With the death of his grandfather, GAY 101's production was delayed, Elite, however, gained exposure with underground releases, "Everytime We Make Love" (2006), "What You've Been Missing" (2007), and "They Love It" (2008).

On February 27, 2008, "Just In Case", a song about the effects of violence and homophobia on gay, black Americans, was released with a corresponding video. The song was inspired by three recent hate crimes. Simmie Williams, Jr., a 17-year-old gay male gunned down in Broward County, Florida, United States on February 22, 2008. Michael Sandy, a 28-year-old gay male hit by a car after trying to outrun his attackers in Plumb Beach, an area of Brooklyn, New York. Lawrence King, a 15-year-old student of E.O. Green Junior High School in Oxnard, California, who was shot by another student, Brandon McInerney, because King asked McInerney to be his valentine. This song has become an anthem in Atlanta's gay scene. Elite has performed "Just In Case" at various events and venues including Atlanta nightclub, Sugarhill, Atlanta's queer music festival, Mondo Homo, and House of Integritea. Elite has also performed with black gay music pioneer, Tim'm West. His with Tim'm have received critical acclaim.

In 2016 after a 7-year hiatus, Anye Elite returned with "Yass Lawt" a song controversial for its use of religious imagery and gay sex references. "Yass Lawt" is from the Elite's upcoming album "No Faux". He also debuted his pop culture e a d lifestyle blog IconCity.net and made the G Listed's list of 100 Outstanding LGBT People of Color.

=== Mixtapes ===
Title	Album details	Ref.
Sneak Preview	Release: 29 Novemberl 2009; Label: Ellis Island Entertainment; Format: Digital download	
Sober Thoughts	Release: November 7, 2014; Label: Ellis Island Entertainment; Format: Digital download	

== Community activism ==
In early 2006, Elite began his role as an activist by lending his talents to community initiatives including the American Cancer Society's Relay for Life in Miami, Florida. After witnessing the epidemic of new HIV infections in the Miami-Dade area, Elite started working with the University of Miami's Future Leaders of the World (F.L.O.W.) program. There, he toured the area educating youth about the dangers of unsafe sex in a performance art piece he helped create. In October 2006, Logo's hit show, Noah's Arc, inspired him to influence unity and progress in the black, gay community. He decided to relocate to Atlanta, Georgia, an area considered by many to be the black, gay Mecca. Elite has volunteered at AID Atlanta, the largest AIDS service organization in the southeastern United States, in programs such as The Deeper Love Project and Evolution Project.

In February 2007, Elite helped organize Phyre, Atlanta's first weeklong celebration of black gay, lesbian, bisexual, and transgender history. Phyre includes the controversial Question homoPhobia media campaign. Elite was a spokesmodel for the campaign and was featured in a February 2007 edition of Atlanta's gay publication, Southern Voice, where he outlined the importance of the arts and their relationship to social equality. In the spring 2007 edition of Clik magazine, Elite shared his coming out experience as an inspiration for people who are struggling with their sexuality. Elite's maternal grandfather shared his take on the experience as a way to support those coming to terms with the coming out of a family member. Presently, Elite continues to work with the community to foster education and to empower gay people to live independent and fulfilling lives. His most recent work has included aiding in finding and establishing quality care for LGBT youth.

== See also ==
- Homohop
