= Philip Goff =

Philip Goff or Phillip Goff may refer to:

- Phil Goff, New Zealand politician
- Philip Goff (philosopher), British philosopher
- Phillip Atiba Goff, American psychologist
