= Mélange Lavonne =

American rapper

- Born: Rialto, California
- Genres: Hip-hop; homo hop; Christian hip-hop
- Occupation: Rapper
- Years active: 2007–present

Mélange Lavonne is an American rapper active in the homo hop movement, a subgenre of hip hop performed by LGBTQ artists. Her songs focus on issues such as social equality, discrimination, and faith.

== Early life ==
Lavonne was born and raised in Rialto, California, and attended Luther Burbank High School in Sacramento, California. In 1991, when she was twelve years old, she was diagnosed with Hodgkin lymphoma, which went into remission after chemotherapy. She was later diagnosed with thyroid cancer, a possible result of previous radiation treatments.

She attended college at Dillard University in New Orleans on a basketball scholarship, but was forced out by the coach, who suspected she was gay. As she was not out to her parents at the time, she instead told them it was due to injury.

"Mélange Lavonne" is a stage name, a combination of the French word mélange, meaning mixture, and her middle name, Lavonne.

== Career ==
=== 2007–2009: The Movement ===
Lavonne's 2007 song, "Gay Bash", tells the story of Kevin, a fictional gay man murdered by gay bashers. The music video, directed by Camrin Pitts, was nominated as one of Logo TV's videos of the year, and played at the 2007 Queens International Film Festival in New York City and the 2008 Outfest Film Festival in Los Angeles. Later that year, she starred in a television series called Don't Go, directed by Amber Sharp, playing butch character Jaden.

Her album, The Movement, was released in 2008, produced by Bobby King of Lethal Recordz. The album addresses themes of domestic violence, AIDS, gang culture, and climate change.

Lavonne toured as part of HomoRevolution, the first LGBT hip-hop tour, in 2007 and 2008. She also appeared on the Southern California version of Showtime at the Apollo.

She was named one of "Who's Who in the Black LGBT Community" by BET in 2009.

=== 2013: A Walk in My Shoes ===
In 2013, Lavonne released a studio album, A Walk in My Shoes. In an interview, she called it "a bit more relaxed, more addressing entertainment, a party atmosphere. My last CD was more on the activist level."

== Influences ==
Lavonne grew up listening to Tears for Fears, Duran Duran, and Michael Bublé. She has cited LGBT hip-hop artist Deadlee as one of her influences, saying, "he definitely paved the way, he wasn't afraid to be himself, he wasn't afraid to rap about basically being gay, as a gay male I know it's a little bit harder."

== Personal life ==
Lavonne is lesbian, coming out publicly in 2007 with the release of her song "Gay Bash".
