= Soce, the elemental wizard =

American rapper

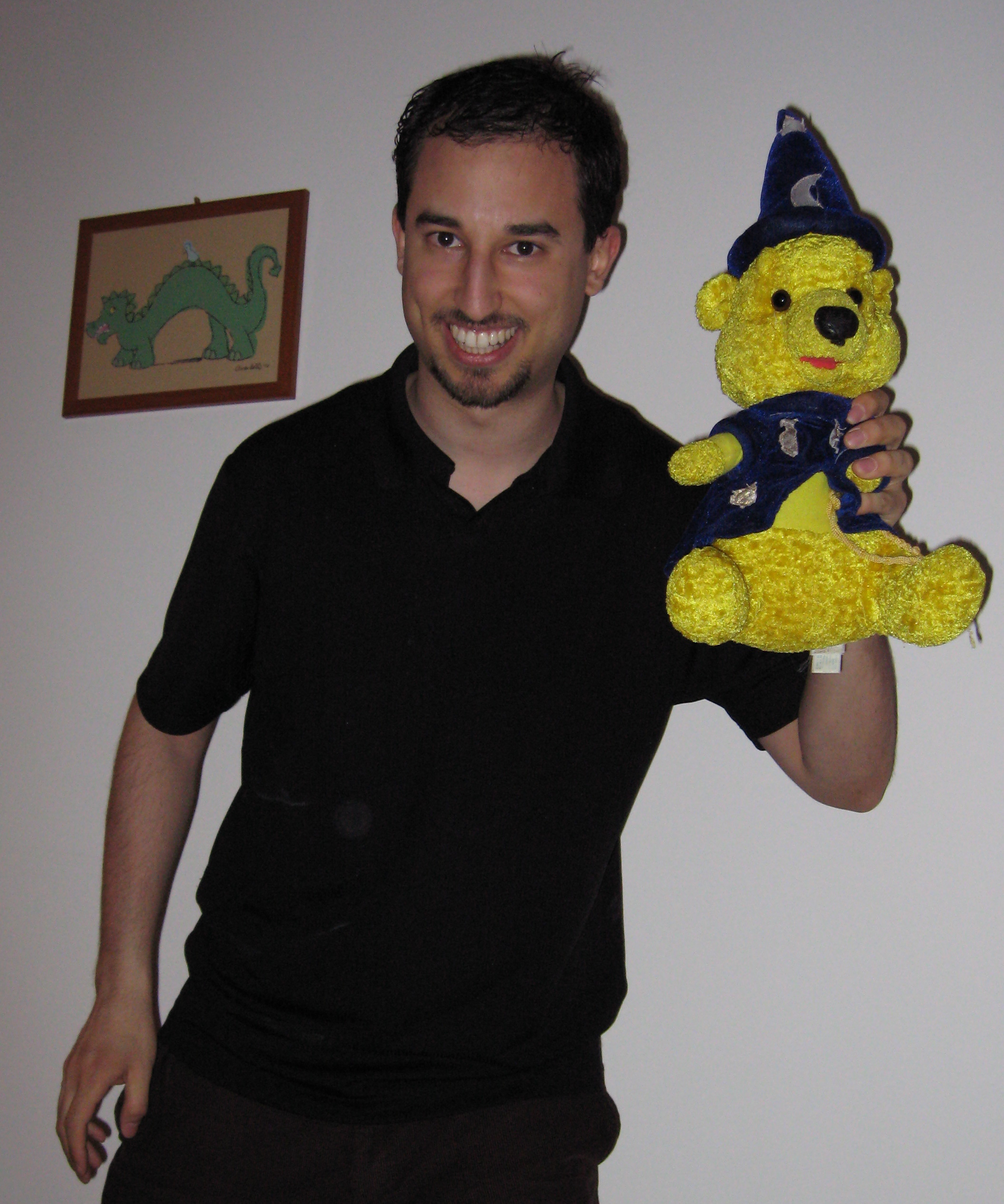
- Soce, the elemental wizard in 2007

Background information
- Born: Andrew Singer
- Origin: New York City, US
- Genres: Hip hop, homo hop
- Occupations: Rapper, record producer
- Years active: 2003–present
- Website: djsoce.com

Andrew Singer, also known as Soce, the elemental wizard, is an American rapper and producer and one of the rap scene’s openly gay MCs.

== Personal life ==
In addition to rapping onstage, Soce plays the violin, piano, guitar and bass. During his performances, he typically dons a wizard’s cap.

Soce is a graduate of Yale University and Phillips Exeter Academy. He is Jewish.

== Music ==
=== Videos and Flash Featurettes ===
Soce has four flash featurettes: Sad and Lonely, RPG Interlude, Internet Treasure Quest and The Shortest Adventure Game You'll Ever Play. Sad and Lonely was screened at film festivals in Minneapolis, Los Angeles, San Francisco, Florida and Brazil, and Soce floats has been screened in at a festival in LA. Music videos for his singles "I Am (So Gay)" and "They Call Me" (both directed by Liam Ahern) have recently begun circulating the web.

=== Appearances ===
Soce had a US tour, where he did shows in Chicago, Indianapolis, Iowa City, Dubuque, Minneapolis, Mountain View, San Diego and Los Angeles. He appeared on MTV, VH1, here!, Logo, WNYC, and Sirius Satellite Radio, (Howard Stern, OutQ, Raw Dog Comedy and Shade 45). He performers and reviews shows for NYC comedy blog The Apiary and also City Scoops, writes a blog for outhiphop.com, reviews videogames for WayTooHip Radio, co-hosted a monthly Math Bee at Chelsea Market with comedian Jen Dziura and co-hosts a monthly stand-up comedy show at The PIT (formerly a weekly show in East Village at Cellar 58) with Abbi Crutchfield called Positively Awesome.

He produces music for many other performers, including the track "Lick It" by God-des and She, which they performed live on the season finale of The L Word and produced "The Whole World" by MF Grimm—which appears on Grimm's 2006 album American Hunger, in addition to "U & U", "Karma" and "Sick" by QBoy, which features soce contributing a guest verse. He produced the music for the music video "Hold Tight" by Rob Cantrell and the intro to "EZ Heeb" plus the entirety of "Booty Shake" by Athens Boys Choir.

Bigg Nugg released a CD single and a music video of his collaboration with Soce, entitled "I Remember".

In 2007, Soce co-hosted NYC's gay pride parade, along with fellow gay artist Sandra Grace. Soce and Sandra co-hosted the gay pride parade again in 2008, and he did it again in 2009, this time with Sybil Bruncheon.

In 2008, Soce competed in the Sirius Shade 45 gay hip hop competition and won by audience vote.

In 2009, Soce was nominated for two OutMusic Awards; one for hip hop and one for production.

In 2010 and 2011, Soce has been co-hosting a traveling music documentary video produced by Scion. The other co-hosts are Prince Paul and Mr. Dead.

Soce has created a video series called Math Problems in which he asks a special guest a few math questions that they then answer correctly. Each episode contains the following four aspects: 1) Discussion of math. 2) Silly dancing at the beginning. 3) One awkward touch. 4) The intro dancing always takes place in a doorway. Featured guests so far have included Ophira Eisenberg, Prince Paul, Myq Kaplan, Jessica Delfino and Corn Mo.

From 2017 onward, Soce has done most of his live appearances as DJ Soce, DJ'ing a variety of corporate and private events in the CT/NY/NJ/PA region.

Starting at the end of 2023, Soce has been leading a variety of thought-provoking discussions on his personal Facebook page. In January 2025, he posted a rap verse on his TikTok that has been seen over 1.9 million times.

== Discography ==
- Dream de la Dream (2003)
- I'm in My Own World (2004)
- The Lemonade Incident (2005)
- Master of Fine Arts (2009)

=== Life Lessons ===
Soce's upcoming album, Life Lessons, is planned for release soon and features various songs he has released as singles and performed at live shows, including "The Mic" (a song about his love of his microwave oven), "Rob" (a gospel song) and "Too Many Fish" (a collaborative track features 3-bar guest verses by Prince Cat-Eyez, Lester Greene, Humility's Hand, Tim'm West, Amnesia Sparkles, FoxxJazell, Mistamaker, Tori Fixx, Wayne Latham, JFP, Delacruz and Chewy).

== Production Discography ==
=== 2003 ===
- "Passport to the Future" - End of the Weak
- "What You Thought It Was" - Access Immortal
- "Mi Corazon R&B Remix" - Julio Granados
- "Bronx" - PM US & Migs
- "You Don't Know" - PM US & Migs
- "Love Me" - PM US & Migs
- "Violence" - Keith Zarriello
- "Fight" - Chaz Neo

=== 2004 ===
- "On and On" - Timothy Dark
- "LSDF Remix" - Houston Bernard

=== 2005 ===
- "Lick It" - God-Des and She
- "Dream Songs" - Brer Brian
- "By Your Side" - Brer Brian

=== 2006 ===
- "The Whole World" - MF Grimm
- "Sick" - QBoy

=== 2007 ===
- "The Bunny" - Scotty the Blue Bunny
- "Wedding Flowers" - Po2.com (produced all of the music for this online flash game)

=== 2008 ===
- "Hold Tight" - Rob Cantrell
- "Special Needs" - Prince Cat-Eyez
- "Black and Blue" - The Vagilantes

=== 2009 ===
- "How to Rob Comics" - Miss CKC, TMC (recorded, mixed)
- "Summer Jam" - Miss CKC, TMC, Beena Steena (recorded, mixed, added drums)
- "DAMN (You Wish)" - Miss CKC, TMC, Beena Steena (recorded, mixed, added drums, record scratching)
- "Date an Asian" - Jen Kwok
- "U & U" - QBoy
- "Karma" - QBoy
- "Booty Shake" - Athens Boys Choir
- "EZ Heeb" - Athens Boys Choir (intro only)
- "Beer Belly" - Lester Greene
- "Hit the Bar" - Lester Greene featuring Amnesia Sparkles
- "Life is What You Make It" - Lester Greene
- "Most People Are Idiots" - Jeff Scott
- "Reclaim" - Jeff Scott

=== 2010 ===
- "Take You Home" - Jen Kwok featuring Miss CKC
- "Less Money, Mo Problems" - TMC featuring Miss CKC
- "Graduation Day" - Coolzey
- "Player 2" - Whitney Meers

=== 2011 ===
- "That Thang" - Jen Kwok featuring DanAKADan
- "Scarlett Johansson" - Amy Albert
- "Cheap" - St. Laz
- "Hooda Math Theme Song" - Hooda Math

=== 2012 ===
- "Wu-Tang Killa Beatles" - Zach Sherwin
- "Toothpick" - Zach Sherwin
- "No Shade" - Shorty Roc featuring Bone Intell
- "Theme Song" - The Miscellaneous Math Show

=== 2013 ===
- "Spicify My Love" - Jackie Silvestri
- "Buddha Worm" - Zach Sherwin
- "Afraid of Everything" - Schäffer the Darklord featuring BB Heart
- "Babies n Sh**" - Rob Cantrell featuring Miss CKC
- "Stage Name" - Zach Sherwin
- "Grabbing Lunch Podcast Theme Song" - Matt Knudsen
- "Mice" - Schäffer the Darklord
- "Giant Iron Snake" - Schäffer the Darklord
- "End of the World Reunion" - Schäffer the Darklord featuring Katastrophe and Strict Chem
- "Intervention" - Schäffer the Darklord featuring Dr. Awkward, Adam WarRock, Jesse Dangerously, MC Frontalot, YTCracker, Coolzey and Nelson Lugo
- "The Amender" - Schäffer the Darklord

=== 2014 ===
- "Letter C" - Zach Sherwin
- "Row J Theme Song" - The Jewish Channel
- "American - Intro Music" - Matt Knudsen

=== 2015 ===
- "Coolsay" - EP by Coolzey featuring Schäffer the Darklord, Nelson Lugo, Tyler Davis Parkford and Belly Belt
- "Pop Music" - Zach Sherwin

=== 2016 ===
- "Circumcising Wolverine" - Zach Sherwin
- "Ghost Boo" - Moondrunk featuring Jelly Donut of Freestyle Love Supreme
- "Flab Slab" - Zach Sherwin

=== 2017 ===
- "Coolsay Too" - EP by Coolzey featuring Cat Greenfield, Schäffer the Darklord, DJ Douggpound, Jesse Dangerously

=== 2022 ===
- ”Hooda Math Theme Song 2022” - Hooda Math
