= Juba Kalamka =

American rapper

- Kalamka In 2022

Background information
- Born: July 12, 1970 (age 56); Chicago, Illinois
- Origin: Chicago, Illinois
- Genres: Rap, Electronic, LGBT music, music,
- Instruments: Voice, drum machine, sampler
- Years active: 1988–present
- Label: sugartruck recordings Agitprop! Records Kill Rock Stars
- Website: http://jubakalamka.com

Juba Kalamka (born July 12, 1970) is an African American artist and activist recognized for his work and founding member of homohop group Deep Dickollective (D/DC) and his development of the micro-label sugartruck recordings.

Kalamka has coordinated the release and promotion of five critically successful D/DC albums, the Outmusic Award winning solo debut of former Sister Spit member Rocco "Katastrophe" Kayiatos, and the distribution of the work of numerous other artists in the homohop community.

Kalamka's personal work centers on dialogues on the convergences and conflicts of race, identity, gender, sexuality and class in pop culture. He has written and illustrated several articles for pop culture magazines and journals, Kitchen Sink, ColorLines, and the now-defunct bisexual issues magazine Anything That Moves.

== Activism and advocacy ==
He has been a speaker, panelist, and curator for numerous organizations and conferences, among them the San Francisco Black Gay/Lesbian Film Festival, GLAAD, Hip Hop as a Movement at the University of Wisconsin–Madison, and Burning Closets/Working Our Way Home at Oberlin College. In 2005, Kalamka was contacted by artist and sex worker advocate Annie Oakley (whom he'd met at the Olympia, Washington queer arts fest HomoAGoGo) and accepted an invitation to tour with The Sex Workers'Art Show, a month-long cross-country cabaret-style theater event featuring current and former sex worker artist/activists.

In November 2005, Kalamka was chosen to be one of six plenary speakers at the National Gay and Lesbian Task Force's 2005 Creating Change Conference and received a Creating Change Award for his activist work in queer music community.

Kalamka served as Festival Director for the now defunct East Bay (Oakland, California) Pride in 2003 and the curator/director of PeaceOUT World Homo Hop Festival which ran annually from 2001 through 2007. The success of PeaceOUT inspired the creation of three now-defunct sister festivals; Peace Out East in New York City, Peace Out South in Atlanta, Georgia, and Peace Out UK in London, England.

Kalamka appears extensively in Alex Hinton's 2005 documentary Pick Up the Mic, an active survey of the scene through documentation of homohop artists on tour and in performance at the various PeaceOUT festivals.

He was elected to the Board of Directors of the Queer Cultural Center (producers of the National Queer Arts Festival) and the Strategic Committee of sex worker advocacy organization Desiree Alliance in 2011. He joined the board of national bisexual advocacy organization BiNet USA in 2018 and was elected vice president in 2019. He was elected to the San Francisco EMA HIV Planning Council in September, 2019. Kalamka resigned as vice president of BiNet USA in August 2020 and left the organization in October 2020.

An essay/interview with Kalamka and former bandmate Tim'm West appears in hip hop writer Jeff Chang's collection Total Chaos: the Art and Aesthetics of Hip Hop (Basic Civitas Books).

Kalamka's first poetry collection Son of Byford was released by Nomadic Press in July, 2022. | url = https://www.sf.gov/news--mayor-london-breed-swears-84-appointed-commissioners

== Personal life ==
In December 2006, Kalamka completed the MFA program in Poetics (minoring in Queer and Activist Performance through the schools Experimental Performance Institute) at New College of California in San Francisco. Kalamka identifies as bisexual.

== Discography ==
Kalamka was a founding member of homohop group Deep Dickollective (D/DC) and has frequently collaborated with various music artists.

Deep Dickollective's fifth and final disc, On Some Other was released on Sugartruck in June 2007.

On January 18, 2022 Kill Rock Stars announced the release of the first single and accompanying music video(directed by media artist John Sanborn) by queer rap rock/nü metal collective COMMANDO, featuring performances by Kalamka, The Living Earth Show, former Tribe 8 lead singer Lynnee Breedlove and RuPaul’s Drag Race performer Honey Mahogany, with a full-length album to be released on March 4, 2022.

=== with Deep Dickollective ===
- 2001 - BourgieBohoPostPomoAfroHomo - sugartruck recordings
- 2001 - Independent Sounds:Amoeba Music Compilation Vol. III - Hip Hop Slam
- 2002 - Phat Family Compilation Volume One:Tha Dozens - Phat Family Records
- 2003 - Them Niggas Done Went And Said... - sugartruck recordings
- 2004 - Azadi!: A Benefit CD For RAWA (compilation) - Fire Museum/ElectroMotive Records
- 2003 - Movin' b/w Straightrippin'(C-Phlavormix) (7" single) - Agitprop!/sugartruck
- 2004 - The Famous Outlaw League of Proto-Negroes - sugartruck recordings
- 2004 - Phat Family Compilation Volume Two:Down 4 Tha Swerve - Phat Family Records
- 2005 - Live at Wildseed and Mo - sugartruck recordings
- 2007 - On Some Other - sugartruck recordings
- 2012 - With The Key(Sissies):The Very Best of Deep Dickollective - sugartruck recordings

=== as Juba Kalamka ===
- 2012 - Ooogaboooga Under Fascism - sugartruck recordings
- 2012 - This and That (Instrumental/s) - sugartruck recordings
- 2014 - Codeswitchings (Black Things Tomorrow?) - sugartruck recordings

=== as The Joe Louis Milk Company ===
- 2020 - You Don't Have To Be (instrumentals) - Motisa Methods/sugartruck recordings

=== with Rainbow Flava ===
- 2001 - Family Business - Phat Family Records

=== with Leroy F. Moore Jr. (as JKLM) ===
- 2018 - Invalidations, Volume Too - sugartruck recordings/KripHopNation

=== with Marvin K. White (as Black Ellipsis...) ===
- 2020 - Tth Spc Btwn...A Seminary Avenue - Motisa Methods/sugartruck recordings

=== with He Who Walks Three Ways ===
- 1994 - Me, IBM and The Baby Jesus (self-released demo) - Biglip/WGBL?
- 2020 - Technology Delivered 91/94 - Motisa Methods

=== with COMMANDO ===
- 2022 - Hotel Essex (single) - Kill Rock Stars
- 2022 - COMMANDO (album) - Kill Rock Stars
- 2023 - EMET(Izdis Hymn?) (single) - Kill Rock Stars
- 2023 - Diet Soda (single) - Kill Rock Stars
- 2023 - Four (single) - Kill Rock Stars
- 2023 - Big Big Black (single) - Kill Rock Stars
- 2023 - Luggage n’Umbrage:The Skeebo Sides EP (EP) - Kill Rock Stars

== Filmography ==
In 2003, Kalamka appeared in three sex films; Good Vibrations/Sexpositive Productions G Marks the Spot, Joani Blank's Orgasm: Faces of Ecstasy, and the unreleased Radio Dildo Libre (David Findlay/Blissful Itch Productions) as a part of a personal and artistic dialogue on sexuality and race.

- 2003 - G Marks The Spot: The Good Vibrations Guide to the G-Spot - Sexpositive Productions
- 2004 - Orgasm! The Faces of Ecstasy - Joani Blank, dir. Blank Tapes
- 2005 - Pick Up The Mic - Juba (as himself), Alex Hinton, dir. Planet Janice Films
- 2006 - Making It (background music) - Sobaz Benjamin, dir. National Film Board of Canada
- 2007 - Godspeed (Weed Man/Dime Bag Dealer) - AltCinema Productions
- 2008 - La bisexualité: tout un art? - Juba (as himself), Laure Michel and Eric Wastiaux. dir.
- 2010 - That's So GAY! - Juba (as himself), KB Boyce, dir. QPOC Artists and Mass Media
- 2011 - The Craving - Juba (prod., additional music), Val Killmore Castro, dir. Hellfire Cinema
- 2012 - Heavenly Spire: Juba (as himself), Shine Louise Houston, dir. Pink Label
- 2013 - Sins Invalid (producer, additional music) - Patty Berne, dir.
- 2014 - Fuckstyles 2 - (as himself) - Trouble Films Courtney Trouble, dir.
- 2014 - Fucking Mystic - Juba (as himself) Trouble Films Courtney Trouble, dir.
- 2019 - Is Friendship Legal - Ms. Zoe Kat and Salty Brine, dir.
- 2019 - Whores On Film (aka The Celluloid Bordello) - Juba (as himself), Juliana Piccilo, dir.
- 2020 - The Shock of Gary Fisher(w/COMMANDO) music video - John Sanborn, dir.
- 2021 - The Friend (as St. Fractious) - John Sanborn, dir.
- 2022 - Hotel Essex(w/COMMANDO) music video - John Sanborn, dir.
- 2022 - Prince(w/COMMANDO) music video - Daniel Foerste, dir.
- 2024 - What Does Revolution Sound Like? (documentary) - Alecia Harger, dir.
- 2025 -The Craziest Story -documentary short (as himself) Numeric Pictures - Dave Steck, dir.
