= The Love Rocker Project =

EP by Solomon
- Released: June 28, 2011
- Recorded: December 2010 – April 2011
- Genre: Dance-pop, pop
- Length: 22:50
- Label: SolRay Records
- Producer: Solomon, DJ Shaw-t, Moscow Mark, E-Motion-L Productions, Blackfrost

Solomon chronology
Shades of Black (2009)	The Love Rocker Project (2011)	Le Garçon (2014)

The Love Rocker Project is the second EP by pop singer Solomon, released worldwide on June 28, 2011. The lead single, "Wit Us U Can't..." featuring American rapper Bry'Nt, was released on February 15, 2011, along with a music video.

== Background ==
Back in May 2010, Solomon told OutHipHop.com that his upcoming EP will be more Hip-Hop. At the time of this statement he began work with the original producers from his mixtape past and from his "Shades of Black" EP, but those tracks never surfaced or made it on the new EP. In the beginning of 2011 a track titled, "Dancing All Alone" was released with positive reviews. It was slated as a buzz single off the new project. Everyone was then informed that Solomon was in fact back in the studio working on a full Pop EP with a slated Spring 2011 release.

Solomon took to Twitter and tweeted to fans that "Dancing All Alone" was not the first single and a song titled, "U Can't F*ck Wit Us" was in fact the first single off the new EP. It was later noted that US rapper Bry'Nt would make a feature on the song as well. Based on high demand, the single was initially leaked late January. The title of the single was immediately amended to "Wit Us U Can't..." and rushed to iTunes. Filming of the music video began immediately, with the music video premiering on MTV network LOGO on their NewNowNext PopLab April 7, 2011.

Solomon began touring in promotion of the new EP. On June 28, 2011 the EP was released worldwide in digital and physical formats. AOL Music celebrated with a Listening Party the week of release. While iTunes holding the exclusives to the Deluxe Version with two bonus tracks.

== Recording ==
Upon relocating from California to New York, Solomon began writing songs for other artist in October 2009 and also began writing songs for his upcoming EP. One of the songs "Serial Killer" was for Rihanna's fifth studio album, but was later not added as the song was too dark and not the direction they were going at the time. Solomon then reproduced the song and decided to add the song to "The Love Rocker Project".

== Track listing ==
No.	Title	Writer(s)	Producer(s)	Length
1.	"Wit Us U Can't... (Feat. Bry'Nt)" (featuring Bry'Nt)	S. Barnett, B. Bailey	DJ Shaw-t	3:48
2.	"West Coast !$#"	S. Barnett	DJ Shaw-t, Solomon	3:45
3.	"Hold Me Close"	S. Barnett	BlackFrost	3:41
4.	"Bang! Bang!"	S. Barnett	DJ Shaw-t, Solomon	3:56
5.	"Serial Killer"	S. Barnett	DJ Shaw-t, Solomon	4:18
6.	"Dancing All Alone"	S. Barnett	Epik	3:06
7.	"Never Again (Bonus)"	S. Barnett	E-Motion-L	3:49
8.	"Round and Round (Bonus)" (featuring LastO)	S. Barnett, G. Hayes	Moscow Mark	3:40
