= Center for Policing Equity =

Research center on policing

Coordinates: 34.08809°N 118.37945°W

The Center for Policing Equity (CPE) is a research center founded at University of California, Los Angeles and now based at Yale University. Dr. Phillip Atiba Goff, a Professor of African-American Studies and Psychology at Yale University, is the Co-founder and CEO. Dr. Tracie L. Keesee, who spent 25 years in the Denver Police Department, co-founded CPE with Dr. Goff and is the President and COO.

The Center for Policing Equity is a 501(c)3 nonprofit that collects and analyzes data surrounding police interactions with the community to diagnose disparities in policing. Their mission is “justice through science”, using social science to improve policing and reduce racial disparities.
