= Solomon Ray =

American rapper

- Also known as: Sol B., Solomon
- Born: Solomon Raymond Barnett
- Origin: San Diego, California, United States
- Genres: Reggaeton, latin Pop, pop, indie pop, electropop, hip hop
- Occupations: singer, rapper, producer, songwriter, performer, DJ, model
- Years active: 2008–present
- Label: SolRay Records
- Website: www.solomonraymusic.com

Solomon Raymond Barnett, better known as Solomon Ray, is an American recording artist, producer, DJ, singer and songwriter.

== Biography ==
Solomon Ray is a pop recording artist, rapper, producer, and songwriter based in San Diego California. He is of Mexican and African American descent. He is also the founder of SolRay Records.

Releasing two street mixtapes and numerous freestyles, Solomon has generated a massive internet buzz, selling more than ten thousand copies of his mixtapes.

In the Summer of 2008, Solomon, along with other out rappers, was featured on Eminem's Sirius Satellite Radio Shade 45 to be featured on a month-long segment of the Cipha Sounds Effect Morning Show. Openly gay, he is one of the first gay rappers to ever be featured on the uncensored radio station, along with Soce, JFP, Shorty Roc and Bry'Nt.

On June 28, 2011, Solomon released his highly anticipated sophomore EP titled "The Love Rocker Project." AOL Music highlights the EP for "blending synth-pop and club-banging beats." The first single was club anthem "Wit Us U Can't..." which explores more of Solomon's confident exterior and has a dubstep breakdown. The music video for the song debuted on VEVO and MTV network LOGO on NewNowNext: PopLab along with remixes by SpekrFreks. Solomon later embarked on a tour opening up for Deborah Cox reaching cities nationwide including New York City, West Hollywood, Boston and more.

In January 2012, Solomon announced that he was back in the studio and working on new music. The singer released a cover of Swedish pop star and singer Robyn's 2010 hit "Dancing on my Own." During this time he release his single, "Life Goes On..." May 2012. In early 2013 he announce he began working on his debut album, "Why Boys Cry."

In 2017, Solomon Ray returned to music with the single "El Otro", his first original song in three years and his first original Spanish-language release. In 2018, he released the reggaeton single "Asi Asi!". In 2020, he released the EP La Mala Introducción. In 2021, he launched The Solomon Ray Podcast. In 2022, Ray released the single "Quiero Tu Amor", which Latina described as his first release since the 2020 EP La Mala Introducción. In 2024, he published his debut cookbook, Divine Cooking with Solomon Ray.

== Discography ==
- Rhyting Rhymes Vol. 1 - Mixtape 2008
- Rhyting Rhymes Vol. 2 - Mixtape 2008
- Shades of Black - EP 2009
- The Love Rocker Project - EP 2011
- "Life Goes On..."
- Le Garçon - EP 2014
- La Mala Introducción - EP 2020
- SR2 - EP 2022

=== Rhyting Rhymes Vol. 1 and Vol. 2 ===
Rhyting Rhymes Vol. 1 was recorded from January 2008 to April 2008. Solomon began recording remixes to popular songs, such as Danity Kane's "Pretty Boy", and eventually released a 28 track mixtape to the public. After promoting Vol. 1, he was then urged to record the follow-up. Solomon began recording Rhyting Rhymes Vol. 2 May 2008 to July 2008 and released a 27 track mixtape, which includes a remake of Lil' Kim's song "How Many Licks?".

=== Shades of Black ===
In 2009, Solomon released his first EP, Shades of Black - EP. He began recording the EP in October 2008, after a tough breakup. The mood of the EP is very somber, yet the sound of the music very upbeat. Shades of Black was Solomon's first international release and a departure from his prior hip-hop efforts. In support of the release of Shades of Black, Solomon conducted a nationwide tour of small club venues.

=== The Love Rocker Project ===
In October 2009, Solomon moved to New York City, where he continues to work on his pop and hip-hop efforts and to write songs for himself and other artists. In early 2011, Solomon began recording The Love Rocker Project, his follow-up to Shades of Black. The Love Rocker Project exhibits the influence of all the musical genres that are important to Solomon—including, pop, dance, electronic pop and hip-hop. In February 2011, Solomon released "Wit Us U Can't...", the first single from the upcoming album. Wit Us U Can't..., featuring rapper Bry'Nt, is a perfect example of Solomon's ability to create magnetic music that incorporates all his influences. On April 6, 2011, MTV's Logo Networks premiered the music video to "Wit Us U Can't..." on its new music show, PopLab. The video can be found on SolomonTV on YouTube. The release of "The Love Rocker Project" was June 28, 2011.

=== Life Goes On... ===
On May 29, 2012, Solomon released is single, "Life Goes On..." with an accompanying lyric video. The single was exclusively premiered on OUT.com and was featured on the front page of the iTunes Dance page. The dance single because a major success for Solomon, as it was remixed by various DJ's including Chew Fu, SpekrFreks and more, helping get the single noteworthy attention from Sirius Radio and Pandora. The music video, directed by JD Forte, was released on August 10 which showcased Solomon's more artistic side. Solomon and JD Forte created a heavily styled music video with lots of symbolism and dark themes, forcing them to create a Director's Cut and a mainstream edit for VEVO. A month later, VEVO featured the music video edit on their website.

February 2013 Solomon went on a promo tour visiting London and Paris, in support of the European release of "Life Goes On...". The European single spent 3 months on the front page on iTunes Dance and went No. 1 in Germany and Denmark.

=== Le Garçon ===
While working on his debut album, "Why Boys Cry" Solomon decided to give fans a new EP as a prelude to the album. Titling the EP "Le Garçon" (meaning "The Boy" in French), the EP is said to be his darkest body of work yet. In December Solomon announced the release date and track listing. Out February 4, 2014, Le Garçon will contain 11 tracks. In a press release the EP is said to be, "Crafted out of isolation and inspired by digital art media, the prelude to Solomon's highly anticipated debut album, Le Garçon is packed with hard-hitting beats, smooth melodies and vulnerable lyrics. The EP, a collection of new original songs, interludes, a poem and a hidden track, finds Solomon comfortably flexing his musical talents while assessing a new generation of music listeners."

=== Why Boys Cry ===
While promoting "Life Goes On..." in Europe, Solomon was photographed sitting front row at various shows during London Fashion Week where he announced he began recording his debut album, Why Boy's Cry. In May, Solomon took to Twitter and unveiled the artwork for his new single, "The Way We Were" as the introduction to his new album. The album is tentatively titled, "Why Boys Cry" and scheduled for a September 2014 release. This will be Solomon's first efforts at a full-length album.

== Name change ==
In March 2015, Solomon changed his stage name to Solomon Ray. He told Out Magazine, Advocate and HIV Plus Magazine, "The music I'm doing now is different and more refined. I can't group it together with my older stuff. So I felt a new name was appropriate. Still Solomon, but just a different ending." To coincide with his name change the artist released a cover of Beck's "Guess I'm Doing Fine".

== Bibliography ==
- Divine Cooking with Solomon Ray (2024) ISBN 979-8218486327
