= Fly Young Red =

American rapper

- Also known as: FYR
- Born: Franklin Randall; October 5, 1991 (age 34); New Orleans, Louisiana
- Origin: Houston, Texas
- Genres: Hip hop
- Occupation: Rapper
- Years active: 2005–present
- Website: www.flyyoungred.com

Franklin Freeman Randall, known by his stage name Fly Young Red is an American rapper who gained notoriety due to his controversial song "Throw That Boy Pussy".

== Career ==
Red was born in New Orleans, Louisiana, and was raised in Southern California to a religious baptist family where he was an active Christian at that time. In his early teenage years, he was a member of a short lived male hip hop/R&B group. When he was fourteen years old, due to events of Hurricane Katrina, he moved to Houston, Texas, where he currently resides.

Red negotiated a deal with Las Vegas based music video production team Level Eight Studios to produce a music video for the song "Throw That Boy Pussy". The video was shot in Summer 2013, and was released on March 18, 2014. In an April 2014 interview with BET, Red stated that he "wasn't ready for a record deal", and that he wasn't contracted by a music label.

== Personal life ==
Red is gay. He decided to be open about his sexuality due to the lack of hip-hop songs played in gay clubs.

== See also ==
- LGBT hip hop
