= Le Garçon (EP) =

EP by Solomon
- Released: February 4, 2014
- Recorded: May – December 2013; Studio West (San Diego), Studios de la Seine (Paris)
- Genre: Dance-pop, pop, electronic, hip hop
- Length: 36:47
- Label: SolRay Records
- Producer: Solomon, DJ Shaw-t

Solomon chronology
The Love Rocker Project (2011)	Le Garçon (2014)

Singles from Le Garçon
- 1. "The Way We Were" Released: July 2, 2013; 2. "Swim No More" Released: October 15, 2013

Le Garçon is the third EP by pop singer Solomon. Released worldwide on February 4, 2014. Lead single "Swim No More" was released October 15, 2013.

== Background ==
While working on his debut album, Solomon decided to release an EP as a prelude to the album. Titling it "Le Garçon" meaning "the boy" in French, the EP is said to be his darkest work yet.

On July 2, 2013, Solomon released his single for "The Way We Were" with accompanying music video on August 25, 2013. The music video was picked by vevo as one of their top 5 R&B songs. However, it was "Swim No More" that was picked to set the tone for the EP and act as the leading single.

== Track listing ==
No.	Title	Writer(s)	Producer(s)	Length
1.	"Ne Me Quitte Pas"	Jacques Brel	Solomon, DJ Shaw-t	1:18
2.	"Swim No More"	S. Barnett	DJ Shaw-t, Solomon	3:25
3.	"Tell Me You Like It (Intermède)"	S. Barnett	Solomon	0.09
4.	"3 Dolla Bill"	S. Barnett	Solomon, DJ Shaw-t	3:33
5.	"Let You Go (Part Une)"	S. Barnett, W. Freeman	Solomon, DJ Shaw-t	2:55
6.	"Boomerang" (featuring LastO)	S. Barnett, LastO	Solomon, DJ Shaw-t	3:47
7.	"Let You Go (Part Deux)"	S. Barnett	Solomon, DJ Shaw-t	1:14
8.	"Crash Into You" (featuring Baron)	S. Barnett, B. Wright	Solomon, DJ Shaw-t, Drummabox	4:52
9.	"Wild Horse (Poésie)"	S. Barnett	Solomon, DJ Shaw-t	1:46
10.	"The Way We Were"	S. Barnett, W. Freeman	Solomon, DJ Shaw-t	3:37
11.	"We Made It Tonight"	S. Barnett	Solomon, DJ Shaw-t, J.D Beatz	10:12
