= Killing of Michael Sandy =

American manslaughter victim (1977–2006)

Michael J. Sandy (October 12, 1977 – October 13, 2006) was a man from Brooklyn, New York, who died after being hit by a car during an attempted robbery. His assailants admitted that they planned their robbery because Sandy was gay.

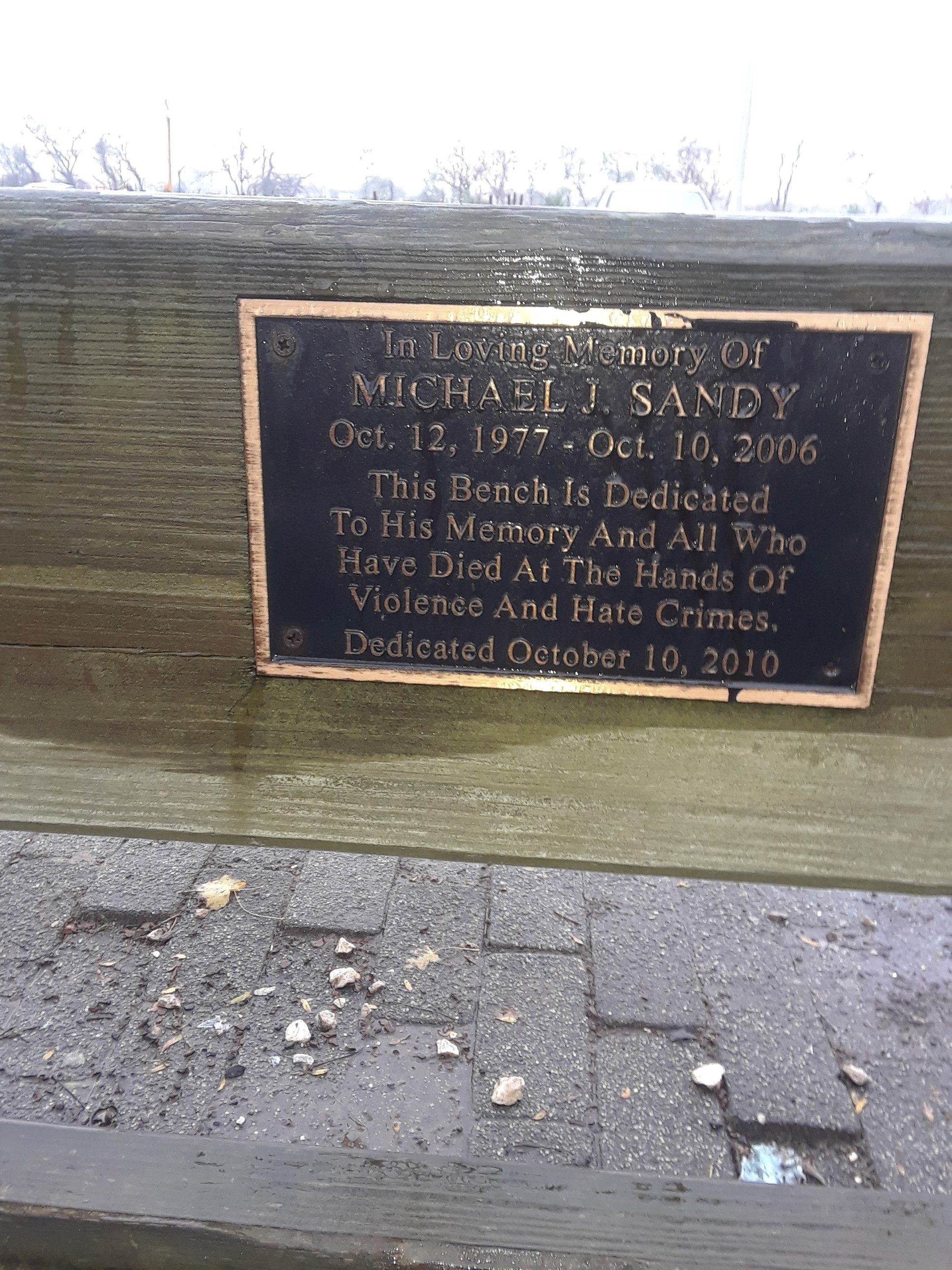
Memorial plaque for Michael Sandy at Plumb Beach, Brooklyn

== Background ==
Michael Sandy, 29, was a native of Bellport, New York, and lived in East Williamsburg, Brooklyn. He worked as a display designer at the IKEA store in Hicksville, New York.

On the night of October 8, 2006, Sandy met Anthony Fortunato, 20, and John Fox, 19, in an online chatroom. After exchanging emails about having sex, Fortunato arranged to meet Sandy at Plumb Beach, a rest stop and popular cruising location on Belt Parkway in Sheepshead Bay, Brooklyn. The meeting took about an hour to arrange. Fox and Fortunato then departed for Plumb Beach with friends Ilya Shurov, 20, and Gary Timmons, 17.

== Attack ==
Sandy drove his 2004 Mazda to the location, and met Fox first, near Emmons Avenue. They then drove to Plumb Beach, where Fortunato, Shurov, and Timmons were waiting.

Shortly after Sandy arrived, witnesses saw two young white men approaching his car. At that time, Sandy was confronted by two of the young men, who began looking through his vehicle. Shurov pulled Sandy from the car and began punching him. At about 9:45 p.m., at least four witnesses saw one white man assaulting another man.

Attempting to escape, Sandy ran toward the highway. He appeared to be calling for help on his cell phone. Two of his attackers caught up with him in the right lane of the highway. Shurov pursued Sandy across the guard rail, caught up with him in the right lane, and punched him. Sandy backpedaled into the middle lane, and was struck. One of the attackers dragged Sandy back to the side of the road. Shurov was seen rifling through Sandy's pockets after he was struck. The driver who hit Sandy left the scene and was never identified.

Unconscious and suffering possible brain injuries, Sandy was taken to Brookdale Hospital, where he was placed on a respirator and remained in a vegetative state. Sandy remained on life support for five days, without regaining consciousness. He died on October 13, 2006, one day after his 29th birthday, when his family made the decision to remove life support.

== Arrests and indictment ==
Following the attack, police got their first lead in the case from Sandy's computer, which was still running the day after. They found exchanges with the AOL screen name "fisheyefox," traced the IP address, and learned that the screen name belonged to Fox.

Investigators visited Fox's home at 11:00 p.m., and Fox's father directed them to SUNY Maritime College, where Fox was a sophomore. Investigators arrived at the college at 2:00 a.m. and asked Fox to come to the 61st Precinct, where they began interviewing him at 2:52 a.m. During his interview, Fox made statements implicating himself, Shurov, Fortunato, and Timmons in the attack on Sandy. Fox also gave two videotaped statements. He identified Shurov as "that Russian kid," but identified him when police took a picture of Shurov from Fox's MySpace page. A detective compared Shurov's picture to mug shots of young men arrested in the 61st precinct, and found a match. Detectives went to Shurov's home and asked him to come to the 60th Precinct police station for an interview. Shurov arrived at the 60th Precinct station at about 8:00 p.m. on October 10. He was read his Miranda rights and later gave statements implicating himself in the crime. Shown a news report about the attack, Shurov disputed the details of the report. At 1:00 a.m. on October 11, Shurov dictated a written statement, and made a videotaped statement at 10:20 p.m. on the same day. Witnesses picked Fox and Shurov out of line-ups and identified them as having been at the scene, attempting to grab Sandy.

Timmons was arrested on October 11. Fortunato was implicated by statements from Shurov and Fox, and surrendered to police on October 25. Fortunato's family raised $1.3 million in hopes he would be granted bail. Bail, however was denied. The suspects were held at Rikers Island without bail.

Following Sandy's death, Fox, Fortunato and Shurov were indicted on October 25, 2006, on charges of second degree murder as a hate crime and attempted robbery as a hate crime. The three also faced possible charges of manslaughter as a hate crime, and faced potential sentences of 25 years to life in prison.

On October 25, 2006, Timmons pled guilty to one count of attempted robbery in the second degree as a hate crime.

== Trial and sentencing ==
During questioning after arrest, the suspects made statements indicating that they had used the Internet to lure gay men in the past. On April 24, 2007, the taped statements by Fox and Timmons were played in court to determine their admissibility at trial.

On August 3, 2007, Judge Konviser ruled that Fox, Fortunato, and Shurov could be charged with hate crimes in Sandy's death. In her written statement, Judge Konsiver said that prosecutors only need to show that Sandy was chosen because of his sexual orientation, under the state's Hate Crimes Act of 2000.

Jury selection started on September 10, 2007, in the New York Supreme Court in Brooklyn for the trial of Anthony Fortunato and John Fox, two of the four men accused of chasing Michael Sandy to his death. They were charged with two counts of second-degree murder, one as a hate crime, four counts of attempted robbery with two as hate crimes, two manslaughter counts, one as a hate crime, and two assault counts, one as a hate crime. The third man, Ilya Shurov, was to be tried separately later on the same charges. The fourth, Gary Timmons, had already pleaded guilty in 2006 to the reduced crime of attempted robbery as a hate crime in return for testifying as a prosecution witness.

On Friday, October 5, 2007, a jury came back with a verdict of guilty against John Fox Jr. on the charges of manslaughter, attempted robbery in the second degree, and attempted robbery in the first degree. All counts were as hate crimes. The prison times Fox faced ranged from 5 to 50 years.

On October 11, 2007, Anthony Fortunato, the third defendant, was found guilty of manslaughter as a hate crime for his role in the death of Michael Sandy. He was also convicted of attempted petty larceny, but acquitted of attempted robbery.

On November 5, 2007, Ilya Shurov, 21, the fourth and last defendant in the Michael Sandy case, pleaded guilty to manslaughter and attempted robbery as hate crimes on the day his trial was to have started. As part of the plea bargain, the charge of felony murder as a hate crime was dropped. Shurov agreed to serve 17.5 years for his guilty plea. If he had been found guilty of felony murder as a hate crime, it could have resulted in a life sentence. Shurov was the only defendant accused of physical violence against Michael Sandy.

Three of the four men were sentenced on November 20, 2007, for their role in causing the death of Michael Sandy in 2006. They received the following sentences from Justice Jill Konviser-Levine of State Supreme Court in Brooklyn, New York: Anthony Fortunato (21), 7 to 21 years. John Fox (20), 13 to 21 years. Ilya Shurov (21), 17 1/2 years. Each of those received slightly less than the maximum sentence. Gary Timmons (17), who in a plea bargain made the previous year, testified as a prosecution witness during the trial against John Fox and Anthony Fortunato, and he was to be sentenced to four years at a later date. Michael Sandy's attorney was Tarsha C. Smith.

== Aftermath ==
On February 27, 2008, openly gay singer-songwriter and community activist Anye Elite released the song "Just in Case", a tribute to Sandy and other gay violence victims.

Sandy's death also brought back to public attention the death of Michael Griffith, an African American man who was killed after being hit by a car in Howard Beach, Queens, New York, while trying to escape a group of attackers.

Fortunato was released on parole in 2015, while Fox was released in November 2017. Shurov, the only one convicted of physical violence against the victim, was released in August 2021.

== See also ==
- Violence against LGBT people
