= QBoy =

- Also known as: Q-Form, Sam LeMans
- Born: Marcos Jose Brito; 10 October 1978 (age 47)
- Origin: Pitsea, Essex, England
- Genres: Hip hop, electronic
- Occupation(s): Rapper, DJ, writer, music producer
- Instrument(s): Vocals, turntables
- Years active: 2001–present
- Website: qboymusic.com

QBoy (born Marcos Jose Brito on 10 October 1978) is a UK-based rapper, producer, DJ, writer and presenter. He is one of the original few out rappers in hip hop circa 2001 that became pioneers of the new subgenre colloquially known as "homo hop". QBoy is currently a DJ and promoter of popular LGBTQ club night and party 'R & She: The Queens of Hip-Hop & R&B' which hosts events in London, Berlin and New York City.

== Early life ==
Brito was born to an English mother and Gomeran (Spanish) father. He studied at De Montfort University in Leicester and received his Contemporary Dance, Acting and Performing Arts B.A. (Hons) degree.

Brito was originally in a group with DJ Mistermaker and rapper Ill Form, recording under the name of Q-Form. Their first recordings, "Dirty Dirty" and "3 Different Stories", were featured on homo-hop CD collections Phat Family volume 1 and Phat Family volume 2, respectively. He was also part of the gay hip-hop DJ crew Pac-Man, which featured DJs NineBob, Gideon, Mistermaker and fashion artist Noki.

Q-Form changed its name to Q-Fam (for Queer Family) and its status from a group to a collective, to include Pac-Man members NineBob, Gideon, Noki and lesbian rapper Mz Fontaine, with whom they recorded the track "New Era." Later members of Q-Fam included singer-songwriter/producer Wayne Latham, rapper Icykal and vocalists Grace Orlando and Katanya. UK gay magazine The Pink Paper featured the Q-Fam Collective with QBoy and Mistermaker on the front cover.

== Career ==
=== 2004–2006: Beginnings ===
QBoy's initial recordings had a tongue-in-cheek sexual humour which was inspired by his then current influences of artist such as Lil' Kim, Foxy Brown, Notorious B.I.G. and Trina, with the notion "if they can be sexual explicit, so can I" making a political standpoint on his prominent sexuality.

In 2004, QBoy released his first extended play "Even the Women Like Him". His first soulful and conscious track Quarter Life Crisis sampled long time idol Neneh Cherry's hit Buffalo Stance and featured singer and producer Wayne Latham with lyrics inspired by his childhood, explaining the transformation from child to adult and drawing from his readings of the book Conversations With God by Neale Donald Walsch. QBoy shot his first music video, Quarter Life Crisis, in September 2004 in London. The video also features the track "Bent Spittin" and is directed by Khalid Laith.

He continued writing in this style with the track "A Deal With God" which originally cleverly used Kate Bush's Running Up That Hill and covered his experiences of homophobic bullying when at school. This propelled him into a more political stratosphere, performing for the Home Office, UK Government in 2006, and making him a patron of the charity Beatbullying and the LGBT Excellence Centre Wales for which he is involved in a programme that goes into schools and breaks down the ideas of homophobia to teenagers.

In 2005, QBoy received a nomination for "Performing Artist of the Year" at the 2005 GALAs. In August 2005, QBoy organised PeaceOUT UK, the first gay hip-hop festival in Europe. He also co-organised the following year's event in 2006.

=== 2006–2008: Remixes Don't Count: The Mixtape and various singles ===
In 2006, he released his first mixtape "Remixes Don't Count: The Mixtape". In July 2006, he was featured in the homo-hop documentary Pick Up the Mic and toured with the film, performing at film festivals in Los Angeles (Outfest), Chicago (The Gay Games) and Philadelphia. Later that month, he shot his second music video, Q.B.O.Y. (Is Just So Fly) in New York. This video was directed by Jarrah Gurrie and fashion photographer Nicolas Wagner. Later that year, he was featured Channel 4's live TV discussion show 40 Years Out.

In 2008, QBoy released two singles "Oh Yeah!" and "Faggot M.C.'s". In late 2008, he toured the US for three months, making New York City his temporary home where he shot the music video to his single "Coming Out 2 Play" with previous director Jarrah Gurrie. He also played extensively with over 30 live dates in New York City, Seattle, Fort Lauderdale and Key West in Florida, and Chicago where he also shot a music video with Johnny Dangerous to their single Hotline which also features rapper Soce and he made a cameo appearance in Johnny Dangerous's video Wan Dat (Ass Is). Plus he got extensive media coverage in HX, Next and interviews with Jonny McGovern, Daniel Nardicio, Shawn Hollenbach and Feast of Fools.

=== 2009–2010: Moxie ===
In July 2009, QBoy released his first album Moxie. The album's lead single and music video to "Coming Out 2 Play" reached No. 6 in the US LOGO Click Chart and was nominated as one of the best new videos of 2010 by LOGO. In February 2010, he released the singles "Keep Keepin' On" and "Yellow Flower" both with music videos. In March 2010, he released the fourth single "Bounce Rave" also promoted with a music video. The DVD release of documentary Pick Up The Mic in which QBoy is one of the featured artists was also released.

=== 2011–2013: New project and moniker ===
QBoy recorded several tracks, including "Party Girl", with NYC producer/DJ Larry Tee under the moniker Sam LeMans in 2011. It was released on Beatport as a single and featured on Larry Tee's album Super Electric Party Machine.

Also in 2011, QBoy performed a LIVE set at Glastonbury Festival within Block 9 at the NYC Downlow.

In 2012, as co-promoter and DJ, QBoy started roadblock party "R & She: A Night Dedicated To The QUEENS Of R&B And HIP-HOP From The 90s To Present" with fellow DJs Neil Prince and David Oh in Dalston, London originally at "Vogue Fabrics" and then moved to larger venue "Tipsy". In the same year he also started the hip-hop and R&B party "Put It In Your Mouth" at venue "Dalston Superstore" also with Neil Prince. Both parties attracted a large queer following.

In 2013, QBoy was booked to DJ at Block 9 at Glastonbury Festival with his party "R & She", which hosted the Vogue Fabrics space within the NYC Downlow.

In June 2013, QBoy started the first queer hip-hop party in Spain with promoter Pepo Bethencourt and DJ "Cascales" AKA Agustin Gomez Cascales, then deputy editor of Spanish gay magazine '"Shangay". The party quickly got invited to regularly host a room at Madrid's popular gay party "Stardust" at venue "Sala Cool" and at Barcelona's "Razzmatazz" club. The party only lasted successfully for one year but attracted much attention from local and national media for its originality.

In July 2013, QBoy alongside promoter Paul Bonham launched "GULLY LIVE", a LIVE performance-based event designed to give a platform to queer hip-hop artist visiting the UK on tour. The first show was held at "VICE" magazine owned venue "Birthdays" in Dalston, London and featured headline US rapper "Cakes Da Killa" with his first ever UK date. He was supported by performances by QBoy and UK rapper "Evon" with DJ "Mistamaker" and hosted by "NineBob". The second "GULLY LIVE" was held again with support from "VICE" magazine, this time at their venue "The Old Blue Last" in Shoreditch in February 2014 during London Fashion Week. Headline acts were QBoy and US rapper "AB Soto" and support came from "Jai Rouge", DJ "Mistamaker" and hosted by "NineBob". This time fashion designers were invited to dress the performers to tie in with London Fashion Week and they included Roberto Piqueras, NOKI, Digby Jackson and TZUJI by Larry Tee.

=== 2014–2016: QING ===
In 2014, QBoy released a new single "Music Makes Us Dance" featuring singer Darkwah. The video for "Music Makes Us Dance" was shot in and around Shoreditch and Dalston, London, where QBoy is based professionally. QBoy then had a selection of summer tour dates around Europe that included performing and playing (DJ) at the Milkshake festival in Amsterdam, UK festivals Secret Garden Party and Glastonbury, Brighton Pride and parties "Sissy" in Berlin and "Boyakasha" in Zurich. His party "R & She" also hosted a tent at The Secret Garden Party.

In 2015, QBoy released a single and music video "DragOn", featuring Norwegian goth-rock artist "Ray Noir" and rapper and DJ "FRANK.co". The song and video has a strong Game of Thrones theme.

In 2016, QBoy released his visual EP QING, (pronounced 'KING' as in a deck of cards, which was the theme of the project) featuring videos for "DragOn", "Show Me Your Deck" sponsored by webcam service CAM4, "Set It Up", a cover version of 1979 classic "Pop Muzik" and an updated remix of "Music Makes Us Dance".

In September 2017, he disclosed on his Facebook page that he had been living with HIV for 6 years and that he was healthy and undetectable. In the statement he explained he wanted to share the information "as maybe someone else out there is having a difficult time coming to terms with their own diagnosis. Or perhaps it could break down the stigma of HIV in someone's mind a little?"

== Other ventures ==
=== Interviewer and writer ===
In his early years, Brito was a journalist and editor of the website gayhiphop.com. He has written for Gay Times, attitude, The Pink Paper and Exprezo and has interviewed artists Salt-N-Pepa, Princess Superstar, Beverley Knight, Mark Ronson, Blu Cantrell, Mica Paris, Nicole Wray and Five Star.

In 2005, he also presented a radio documentary on "The Rise of Homo-Hop" for BBC Radio One.

In February 2007, he presented the much-acclaimed TV documentary Coming Out to Class for Channel 4 where he looked at his own experiences of homophobic bullying at his school and investigating what today's young gay teens are experiencing and demonstrating the lack of support they currently have. The personal and political nature of the film prompted an immediate response from the British Parliament the day after its initial screening where an Early Day Motion was passed in favour to look at the subject brought up in the film. He supported the TV documentary with two radio podcasts for Channel 4 Radio which he also presented. In December 2007, he interviewed his long-time idols, rap supergroup Salt-N-Pepa in New York City for a radio documentary he created and co-produced with Made in Manchester Productions which was aired on BBC Radio 1Xtra.

== Discography ==
Albums

- 2009: Moxie
- 2011: Moxie – Remixes

Mixtapes

- 2006: Remixes Don't Count: The Mixtape

Extended Plays

- 2004: Even the Women Like Him
- 2016: QING

Singles

- 2004: Quarter Life Crisis
- 2006: Q.B.O.Y. (Is Just So Fly)
- 2008: Oh Yeah!
- 2008: Faggot M.C.'s (featuring Johnny Dangerous)
- 2008: Come Out 2 Play
- 2010: Yellow Flower
- 2010: Bounce Rave
- 2010: Keep Keepin' On (featuring Wayne Latham)
- 2014: Music Makes Us Dance (featuring Darkwah)
- 2015: DragOn (featuring Ray Noir & FRANK.co)

Guest Features

- 2006: Keep Outta My Vicinity (Wayne Latham featuring QBoy)
- 2007: Does Your Mother Know (Dusty 'O' featuring QBoy)
- 2007: My Family (Bigg Nugg featuring QBoy & Deadlee)
- 2008: Hotline (Johnny Dangerous featuring QBoy & Soce)
- 2008: Don't Speak (Matthew Duffy featuring QBoy)
- 2009: Str8 Boy! (Peppermint featuring QBoy)
- 2010: JUMP DJ Volume 1 - Bounce Rave (Mixes) (Charity compilation featuring QBoy, Disco Damage, Peppermint, T-Total, Dickey Doo, Luminium)
- 2011: Juicy (Claudia Patrice featuring Sam LeMans)
- 2013: Party Girl (Super Electric Party Machine featuring Sam LeMans & Larry Tee)
- 2013: Love Revolution (Levis Kreis featuring QBoy)
