= Phillip Atiba Solomon =

American psychologist

Phillip Atiba Solomon f.k.a Goff
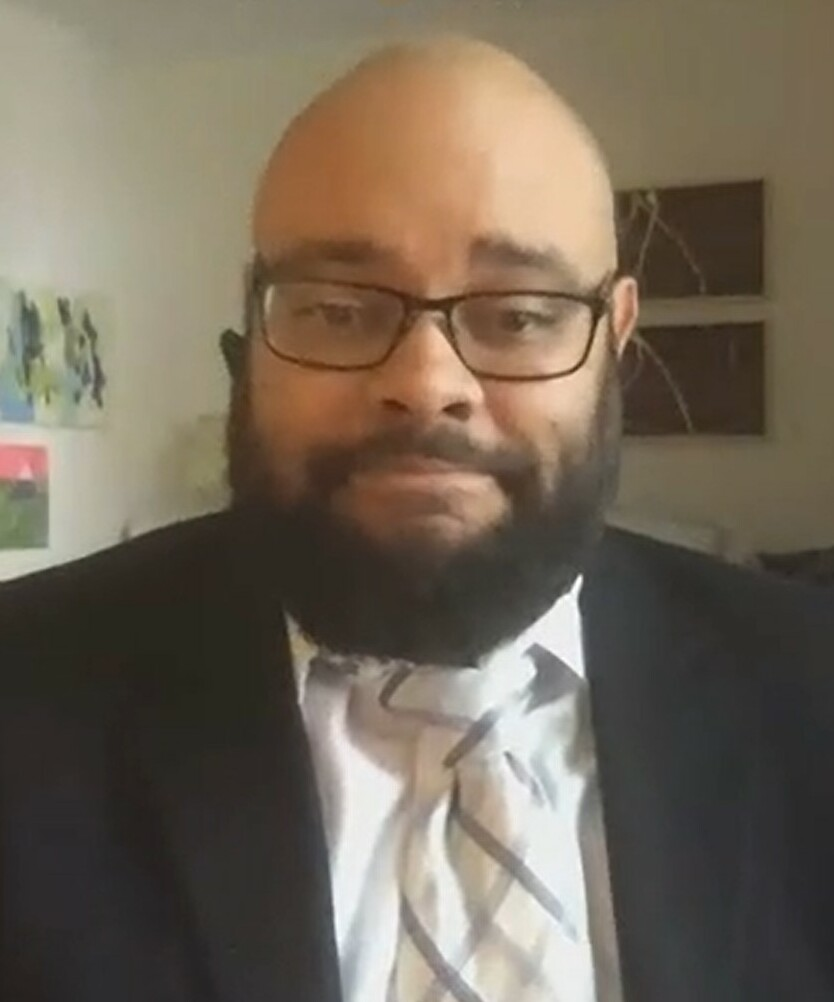
- Solomon in 2020
- Born: 1977 (age 48–49); Philadelphia
- Education: Harvard University AB 1999; Stanford University MA 2001; PhD 2005
- Known for: Work on race and policing in the United States: Policing in the United States; racism; race; psychology
- Scientific career
- Fields: Social psychology
- Institutions: Pennsylvania State University; UCLA; John Jay College of Criminal Justice, Yale University
- Thesis: The space between US: stereotype threat for whites in interracial domains (2005)
- Doctoral advisor: Claude Steele

Phillip Atiba Solomon (formerly known as Philip Atiba Goff) is an American psychologist known for researching the relationship between race and policing in the United States. He was appointed the inaugural Franklin A. Thomas Professor in Policing Equity at the John Jay College of Criminal Justice in 2016, the college's first endowed professorship. In 2020, he became a Professor of African-American Studies and Psychology at Yale University.

== Early life ==
Solomon grew up in Philadelphia. He earned an AB from Harvard University in 1999 in Afro-American studies. He received an MA in 2001 in Social Psychology and a Ph.D. in Social Psychology from Stanford University in 2005.

Solomon is the son of Edwin L. Goff, a Villanova University associate dean, and Florence Withers Goff.

== Career ==
Solomon has been a visiting scholar at the Harvard University Kennedy School of Government and an associate professor of social psychology at the University of California, Los Angeles. He taught at Pennsylvania State University between 2004-2005.

Solomon is the co-founder and CEO of the research center/action organization Center for Policing Equity, which conducts research with the aim of ensuring accountable and racially unbiased policing in the United States. CPE is the host of a National Science Foundation-funded effort to collect national data on police behavior, specifically stops and use of force, called the National Justice Database. The analytic framework Solomon developed as part of the NJD has been called a potential model for police data accountability nationally. In 2016, a decade after its founding, the Center relocated from UCLA to John Jay. In 2020, the Center relocated from John Jay to Yale.

Solomon was also a key figure in the founding of the National Initiative for Building Community Trust and Justice in 2014 and gave testimony before the President's Task Force on 21st Century Policing.

In 2025, Solomon wrote a piece "Am I Still Allowed to Tell the Truth in My Class?" in The Atlantic questioning higher education's response to changes in the United States Department of Education policy to cease all funding for programs that "advance DEI or gender ideology” by the Trump administration.

== Research ==
In 2008, Solomon, Margaret Thomas, and Matthew Christian Jackson published findings that white undergraduates incorrectly identified black women by sex more than any other race or gender.

He has published extensively in journals.

== Personal life ==
Solomon changed his name from Phillip Atiba Goff to Philip Atiba Solomon. He wrote about the reasons for his name change in Time Magazine ("What I Gained When I Gave Up My Father’s Last Name").

In 1999, Solomon co-founded the Oakland, California-based queer hip hop group Deep Dickollective. During his time as a musician in this group, he was known as "Lightskindid Philosopher" or LSP.
