= Tim'm T. West =

American performance artist, author, hip hop musician, poet, and activist

Timothy Terrell West (born July 6, 1972), better known as Tim'm T. West, is an American educator and multi-discipline performance artist, author, hip hop recording artist, poet, activist, and youth advocate. Humboldt State University notes West as a Renaissance man who has achieved success as a performer, activist, author, teacher, and poet. He has been featured in many documentaries about hip hop culture, in addition to his books, he is widely anthologized, and has produced nine hip hop albums including with Deep Dickollective. West has been interviewed by an array of media outlets from Newsweek to the New York Times. He was awarded a "2013 Esteem Award", and in 2015 was named an LGBTQ icon.

== Early life and education ==
West was born with a speech impediment that caused him to stutter and repeat the 'M' on his first name. His family began calling him "Tim'm" which has remained his moniker. He is the second son of nine children, born into a musical family in Cincinnati, Ohio to Charles Edward, a minister, and his mother, Irma Pearl Stinson, who served at various times as an administrative assistant and nurse. He counts his mother as one of the biggest influences on his life, showing him how to be thankful, loving, forgiving, and gracious. His early influences besides his family were reggae, rap and house music. He says his dad was more of a storefront preacher with mixed success, but it did offer the first times West recalls being a poet, and performing. West grew up primarily in Little Rock, Arkansas and later Taylor, Arkansas in extreme poverty, where he attended Taylor High School. He served as captain of his high school basketball team and president of his school's chapter of Future Farmers of America.

He participated in Upward Bound at Southern Arkansas University and competed in the National Science Competitions where he was twice selected to represent his state at the National Junior Science and Humanities Symposium. He met then-Governor Bill Clinton and traveled to The United States Military Academy at West Point to compete. He was interviewed by West Point recruiters, but after revealing he had same-sex interests, he was dropped as a potential recruit. West is now openly queer.

His activity as a Boy Scout led him to join the Church of Jesus Christ of Latter-day Saints (LDS Church) which sponsored his troop. He began attending LDS Church functions at the age of twelve. While being considered for a Mormon mission, he came out to his Bishop, which heightened his existing feelings of rejection and shame. This was a difficult for him, and he contemplated his future, as well as suicide. He struggled with depression and anxiety. He decided to move on to attend college, accept himself, even if uncertain about what his future held. His tireless work as a high school student enabled many opportunities for college, Cornell University and Duke University among others.

West enrolled at Duke University, in Durham, North Carolina, and used an opportunity while at Duke, to attend Howard University in his senior year to experience and study at a historical black college. He returned to complete his studies at Duke, and graduated in 1994, earning a Bachelor of Arts degree in philosophy, with a concentration in women's studies and pre-law. After a few years working as a college admissions officer at Duke, he moved to New York City to attend The New School for Social Research where he earned a Masters of Arts degree in liberal studies and philosophy in 1998, while immersing himself in the spoken word and poetry scene in Brooklyn and Manhattan. He later earned a master's in modern thought and literature from Stanford University.

== Deep Dickollective/hip hop ==
West traveled to the west coast, enrolling in a Ph.D. program in interdisciplinary modern thought and literature at Stanford University. Shortly thereafter in 1999, he discovered that he had HIV, so he took an academic break to focus on his health and options for his future. It was during this time that he started youth advocacy work and joined forces in early 2000 with Juba Kalamka, and Phillip Atiba Goff to form the black and queer hip-hop group Deep Dickollective (DDC). West believes the Bay Area, with San Francisco's AIDS activism, and Oakland's Black Panthers, was one of the few settings where DDC could emerge. The "idea of pan-Africanism and black nationalism is also kind of working against progay [causes]. It's one of the few places were those two identities converge." DDC was one of the first groups of their kind. They were formed, in part, as a response to the pandemic of HIV/AIDS among queer black men. Curator William Jones booked them as part of his "Black Gay Male Radical Performances" series at the Black Dot Café in Oakland, California. Their debut recording "BourgieBohoPostPomoAfroHomo" surprised hip hop and spoken word communities, with a fresh approach to the political and social issues, from a perspective of an increasingly vocal black and queer community. What started as a parodic exercise became an underground, and critical success. West continues to educate on homophobia in hip hop. West coined the term homohop but feels that the term should be replaced. At first it helped organize LGBTQI hip hop artists, but he feels now it serves to separate artists who are fundamentally just hip hop artists.

West is featured prominently in the 2005 hip hop documentary, Pick Up the Mic and appears in Byron Hurt's documentary Beyond Beats and Rhymes. Most recently he appeared in a set of documentaries directed by Mario Van Peebles about black manhood and responsibility; Bring Your 'A' Game and its complement, Fair Game? In Spring of 2007, DDC released its final, full-length studio project, On Some Other, on Sugartruck Recordings. The group disbanded in 2007. DDC was a part of The Anthology of Rap book from Yale University Press in 2010. West credits DDC for breaking through the media as queer and black artists, and enabling him to perform as an out LGBT black soloist, "We had pretty much remained invisible in the media prior to Deep Dickollective, so the effect was far-reaching."

As a solo artist, West released Songs from Red Dirt on Cellular Records in 2004. The debut provided musical complement to his first book, Red Dirt Revival: a poetic memoir in 6 Breaths (2003). West says the book and CD are testimonial, they are "literary and musical projections of my rites of passage from shame and silence into self-love."

In 2005 he released a chapbook, BARE: Notes From a Porchdweller. Flirting (2007), was his second full-length poetic memoir book. Also in 2007 he completed his second solo album, Blakkboy Blue(s), which was met with positive critical response. In the Fall of 2008, and in support of the campaign against California's Proposition 8, West created a limited edition chapbook Love In Full Color. In January 2009, he released a third solo rap project, In Security: The Golden Error. In July 2011 he released Fly Brotha, which also received critical acclaim. His fifth solo release, Snapshots: The He-Art and Experience of Tim'm T. West, was released in April 2013.

West continues to host "Front Porch," a spoken word/hip-hop/soul showcase that has appeared at various colleges and universities nationwide. He continues to teach and perform nationally, promoting a collection of poetry released in April 2015, "pre|dispositions: affirmations on loving" and a new Hip-Hop/Soul/House project, "ICONography," which was released in October 2015.

== Educator ==
West worked in HIV/AIDS advocacy awareness and mobilization, specializing his work for young black gay, bisexual, same gender loving men at both AID Atlanta and Saint Hope Foundation's FUSION Center in Houston, Texas. He has been recognized for his work over multiple years with the National Association of People with AIDS's "Positive Youth Institute," and his graduation as a distinguished fellow of the Black AIDS Institute's "African-American HIV University's Community Mobilization College."

West served as the Department Chair of English and Creative Writing at the Oakland School of the Arts from 2002 to 2004 before relocating to Washington, DC where he taught in the English Department of the Cesar Chavez Public Charter High School. In various capacities, since 1995, West has also worked for College Summit, notably as a high school coordinator in DC in 2006 and 2007, where he helped to the build capacity of high schools to get more of their students into college. He is known for his engaging teaching methods, and has taught on the post-secondary level as an instructor of Writing Pedagogy classes at Eugene Lang College of The New School in New York City, and as an instructor in Stanford University's first-year Writing and Critical Thinking Program. In the 2008 to 2009 Academic Year, West taught in the Department of World Languages and Cultures as a Visiting Lecturer in Ethnic Studies at California's Humboldt State University. More recently, West served as an adjunct professor of English and Philosophy at Houston Community College, and in the summer of 2011, joined distinguished faculty with the Washington National Cathedral Scholars Program where he taught a 6-week blog-based social justice/activism course.

In May 2011, West relocated to Chicago, Illinois, where his daughter, Shannon Rose Matesky, a recent DePaul University graduate and well known poet, spoken word artist and performer, lives. He started MyWritingProfessor.com where he serves as the owner and principal consultant, and remains a longstanding advocate for youth. In December 2012, he accepted a position at the Center on Halsted where he was swiftly promoted to serve as the director of youth services through May 2014. Tim'm's desire to have a broader impact on LGBTQ youth and young adults led his interest in Teach For America, who'd just launched its LGBTQ Initiative and was seeking a managing director. Given the trajectory of his own struggles as a queer black male in the South and even a suicide attempt at sixteen, Tim'm proudly accepted this position with Teach For America in July 2014; a position he feels bridges his work as an educator with his long-standing commitment to LGBTQ youth advocacy. He relocated from Washington, DC to Atlanta, GA where he serves on the Atlanta-based Programming Board for the LGBT Institute. Tim'm was promoted to Senior Managing Director of Teach For America's LGBTQ Community Initiative and continues to do work nationally to advance safer and braver classrooms for LGBTQ kids and educators.

== See also ==
- Assotto Saint
- Essex Hemphill
- Gil Scott Heron
- Langston Hughes
- Marlon Riggs
- Melvin Dixon
