= Tori Fixx =

American rapper

Tori Fixx is one of the first openly gay hip hop artists. He also produces music for other noted queer performers. He is based in Minneapolis.

== Career ==
In the mid-90s, he DJed at parties for Prince at Paisley Park Studios in Minnesota.

After moving to San Francisco circa 1997, he became a part of the hip hop group Rainbow Flava and appeared on their second CD, Digital Dope. He released the first of six solo CDs to date in 1998.

Fixx was living again in Minneapolis in 2001 but paid a visit back to the Bay Area to appear in the 2003 PeaceOUT World Homo Hop Festival in Oakland.

Fixx's music appeared on the soundtrack of the 2004 film The Ski Trip.

He appeared in the 2005 documentary Pick Up the Mic about the LGBT hip hop scene; he had produced music for or worked with half of the artists in the film. His CD Marry Me was named as one of The Advocate's top 10 indie CDs for 2005; the title song was a commentary on same-sex marriage and it was nominated for a 2005 Outmusic Award for Out Song of the Year.

Fixx produced fellow gay rapper Johnny Dangerous' CD Dangerous Liaisons; Fixx released it on his label US 2, and it was nominated for a 2004 Outmusic Award for Outstanding New Recording - Male.

In 2007, Tori Fixx was part of the "HomoRevolution Tour 2007" and appeared on The Tyra Banks Show along with Deadlee and Foxxjazell. His CD Code Red marks 10 years of being an openly gay hip hop artist.

Late in 2008 he released Couture, which he had planned to have cover more political topics, but it turned towards the personal after a relationship break-up.

== Discography ==
Year	Title
1998	Impact
2000	The Mochasutra
2001	REfixx
2003	Black.Out
2004	Marry Me
2007	Code Red
2008	Couture (Code Red 2)
2009	The Fixxology
2017	Get It On (single)
2017	That's Me (Remixes - LGTFX)
2018	Cocktails (LGTFX)

== See also ==
- Homo hop
- No homo
