= Deep Dickollective =

American hip hop group

- Origin: Stanford University, California, United States
- Genres: Hip hop, Homo hop
- Years active: 2000–2008
- Labels: Sugartruck Recordings, Agitprop! Records
- Past members: Juba Kalamka (2000-2008); Tim'm T. West (2000-2008); Phillip Atiba Goff(2000-2001); Ralowe Trinitrotoluene Ampu (2000-2003); Doug E. (2001); Dazie' R. Grego (2001); Jerry 'JbRAP' Brown (2002-2008); Marcus René Van (2002-2008); Leslie "Buttaflysoul" Taylor (2004-2008); Soulnubian (2003-2006); Solas B. Lalgee (2005-2008); Baraka Noel (2005-2008)
- Website: www.deepdickollective.com

Deep Dickollective (D/DC) was an LGBT hip hop group based in Oakland, California that were active in the homo hop scene of openly queer/LGBT artists during the 2000s. They were regular performers at the PeaceOUT World Homo Hop Festival curated by group co-founder Juba Kalamka.

== History ==
Deep Dickollective was formed in early 2000 by Juba Kalamka, Tim'm T. West and Phillip Atiba Goff.

The three began working together after Kalamka and West met following a 1999 screening of black gay filmmaker and scholar Marlon Riggs' film Tongues Untied. Kalamka and West later met Goff on the campus of Stanford University, where West and Goff were enrolled in PhD programs. Though Goff, Kalamka, and West had performed solo work at several readings in the previous months, The group's first performance as Deep Dickollective was May 12, 2000 as a part of curator William Jones' Black Gay Male Radical Performances series at the legendary Black Dot Cafe's original location at 2330 International Blvd. Titled "With The Key: SISSSIES", the show's naming served as an overt recontextualization of popular early 1990s Afrocentrist/Black Nationalist rap group X-Clan's homophobic tag line.

Kalamka and West had been performing for years as MCs but had few opportunities to work as out queer artists until encountering each other and Goff shortly thereafter. Kalamka had begun recording an experimental spoken word project called "Pre/tensions" with San Francisco blues and avantgarde jazz guitarist/bassist Dick Deluxe Egner (formerly of Club Foot Orchestra) and with groundbreaking queer hip hop group Rainbow Flava, but both were interested in the possibility of creating a project that would push buttons around race, queerness and masculinity in hip hop all at once.

Frustrated with the resistance they had faced from an allegedly progressive "conscious" spoken word scene, the three began jamming together in private on Stanford's campus and came up with the skeletons of about 20 songs, 13 of which would become their debut recording BourgieBohoPostPomoAfroHomo. In a moment of anger while discussing their difficulty with the local scene (West had been performing at readings and with bands since his arrival in 1998, but lost all of his bookings once the scene became aware that he was gay) Kalamka blurted "well, if them girls can call themselves the Punany Poets (a then popular Oakland poetry group), we can be Deep Dick Collective!". The name was then shortened to "Deep Dickollective", but the initials "D/DC" remained as the three letter abbreviation seemed to roll off the tongue well, and signified the group's deconstructionist intent. What started as a parodic exercise to vent frustration became a blooming underground yet internationally critical success that involved 11 queer men who recorded and performed as members of D/DC.

During the recording of BourgieBoho, Kalamka decided that it would be easier to promote and manage the group's work if there was a micro-label of some sort that served as a reference point for people that were hearing about the group. Taking its name from a comment on his and West's choice of clothing by an old black man in downtown San Francisco, Kalamka created Sugartruck Recordings, which has since released additional recordings by D/DC as well as that of rapper Katastrophe (the Outmusic Award winner Let's Fuck Then Talk About My Problems), and did micro-distribution of close to 20 titles by other artists in the scene.

BourgieBoho's release was followed by the 6-song EP Them Niggas Done Went and Said... in 2003, concurrent with a 7" vinyl single release of "Movin' b/w Straighttrrippin'(C-Phlavormix)" by the now defunct Boston punk distro Agitprop! Records.

The group recontextualized statements such as the lyrics "In a circle of faggots, your name is mentioned" from the song "Dooinit" from Common's album Like Water for Chocolate.

The same year, D/DC won the "Best Hip Hop Group" category in the San Francisco Bay Guardian's Best of the Bay reader's poll. In February 2004, the group released its third project, The Famous Outlaw League of Proto-Negroes, which was a double nominee in the 2005 Outmusic Awards as well as being named to Out's Top Ten Gay Albums of 2004 list. March 2005 saw the release of the nine-song EP Live at Wildseed and Mo', as well as much more extensive touring as a group and solo following the premiere of Alex Hinton's documentary Pick Up the Mic at the 30th Toronto International Film Festival.

The ensuing increase in visibility created for queer hip hop artists (as well as the opportunities for self-promotion and distribution created by MySpace) led Kalamka to shift Sugartruck's promotional attentions to releases by himself, Deep Dickollective and Katastrophe.

Its fifth disc, On Some Other was released by Sugartruck on June 22, 2007. Ongoing creative differences and the desire to work on other projects led to Kalamka's formal dissolution of the group in April, 2008. Deep Dickollective played its last contractually obligated show at Albuquerque (New Mexico) Pride on June 13, 2008.

Lyrics from the song "For Colored Boys" (from the album "On Some Other") were included in the lyric compendium The Anthology of Rap of Yale University Press (2010). The group's members currently perform and work as solo artists and lecturers based in various cities across the United States.

== Discography ==
- 2001 BourgieBohoPostPomoAfroHomo (sugartruck recordings)
- 2001 Independent Sounds:Amoeba Music Compilation Vol. III (Hip Hop Slam)
- 2002 Phat Family Compilation Volume One:Tha Dozens (Phat Family Records)
- 2003 Them Niggas Done Went And Said...EP (sugartruck recordings)
- 2004 Azadi!: A Benefit CD For RAWA (compilation) (Fire Museum/ElectroMotive Records)
- 2003 Movin' b/w Straightrippin'(C-Phlavormix) (7"single) (Agitprop!Records/sugartruck recordings)
- 2004 The Famous Outlaw League of Proto-Negroes (sugartruck recordings)
- 2004 Phat Family Compilation Volume Two:Down 4 Tha Swerve (Phat Family Records)
- 2005 Live at Wildseed and Mo' EP (sugartruck recordings)
- 2007 On Some Other (sugartruck recordings)
- 2012 With The Key (Sissies): The Very Best of Deep Dickollective (sugartruck recordings)
