= Shades of Black (EP) =

Shades of Black - EP

EP by Solomon
- Released: August 11, 2009
- Recorded: 2008–2009
- Genre: Pop
- Length: 26:08
- Label: SolRay Records
- Producer: Solomon Barnett

Shades of Black is the debut EP by recording artist Solomon, released on August 11, 2009.

== Background ==
After releasing two hip-hop mixtapes, Solomon began working on the third mixtape. During the creation he began instead playing with more pop sounds. He has stated, "I'm actually in the studio right now working on my new EP. It's a five track EP titled, "Shades of Black". I started more as a full on rapper, releasing mixtapes, doing remixes and stuff. I was featured on Eminem's Shade45 Sirius Radio, did the whole XXL, hip hop magazines and stuff and next thing you know I was thrown into this category that didn't fully reflect me."

== Promotion ==
Along with the release, a remix for "Break My Heart" without gay rapper, Bry'Nt was released as a free bonus track.

== Track listing ==
No.	Title	Writer(s)	Producer(s)	Length
1.	"Hallucination"	Solomon Barnett	Eric Harris	2:46
2.	"Break My Heart"	Solomon Barnett	Eric Harris	3:54
3.	"Cry Baby"	Solomon Barnett	Dan Traynor	3:36
4.	"Fortune Teller"	Solomon Barnett	Gabriel Santiago, Andrew Stewart, Solomon Barnett	3:17
5.	"Over and Over"	Solomon Barnett	Solomon Barnett, Gabriel Santiago, Andrew Stewart	3:37
6.	"Still Waiting"	Solomon Barnett	Solomon Barnett	5:36
7.	"Prodigal"	Solomon Barnett[	Chloé, Eric Harris, Solomon Barnett	4:11
8.	"Break My Heart Remix" (featuring Bry'Nt)	Solomon Barnett, Bryant Bailey	Eric Harris, Solomon Barnett	3:56
