= Caushun =

American rapper

- Born: Jason Herndon; 1977 (age 48–49); Brooklyn, New York

Caushun (born Jason Herndon, 1977) is an American rapper, often erroneously referred to as the first openly gay hip-hop artist to be signed to a major record label in the United States. It was reported that he was to be signed to Kimora Lee Simmons' Baby Phat Records, which was formed for the purpose of releasing/distributing Caushun's album as well as Kimora Lee's attempt at a recording career. Neither record was ever released. "Caushun" sparked interest and was mentioned in a variety of publications, television programs and documentaries, including MTV as a rapper and celebrity judge, BET, VH1, Newsweek, The New York Times and Interview magazine.

After a 2002 interview in the Washington, D.C. LGBT newspaper Metro Weekly, a 2003 profile in The New York Times by Touré, and a feature in The Advocate, prominent hip-hop figures took interest and began to endorse Caushun publicly. In a 2007 interview in Allhiphop.com, Ivan Matias revealed that he created Caushun and that he wrote, recorded and performed all of the work attributed to Caushun. Matias revealed that the Caushun persona started out as a prank when he and friends called into the "Star and Buc Wild Show" on Hot 97 in New York as a flamboyantly gay rapper. After a series of call-in performances that became increasing popular, Matias agreed to meet with radio host Star (aka Troi Torain) at Hot 97, where he explained the situation. Together, they decided that Caushun needed a face as the popularity and demand for the character grew. Matias contacted Jason Herndon who agreed to play the role of Caushun in public.
