= Katastrophe (rapper) =

American rapper

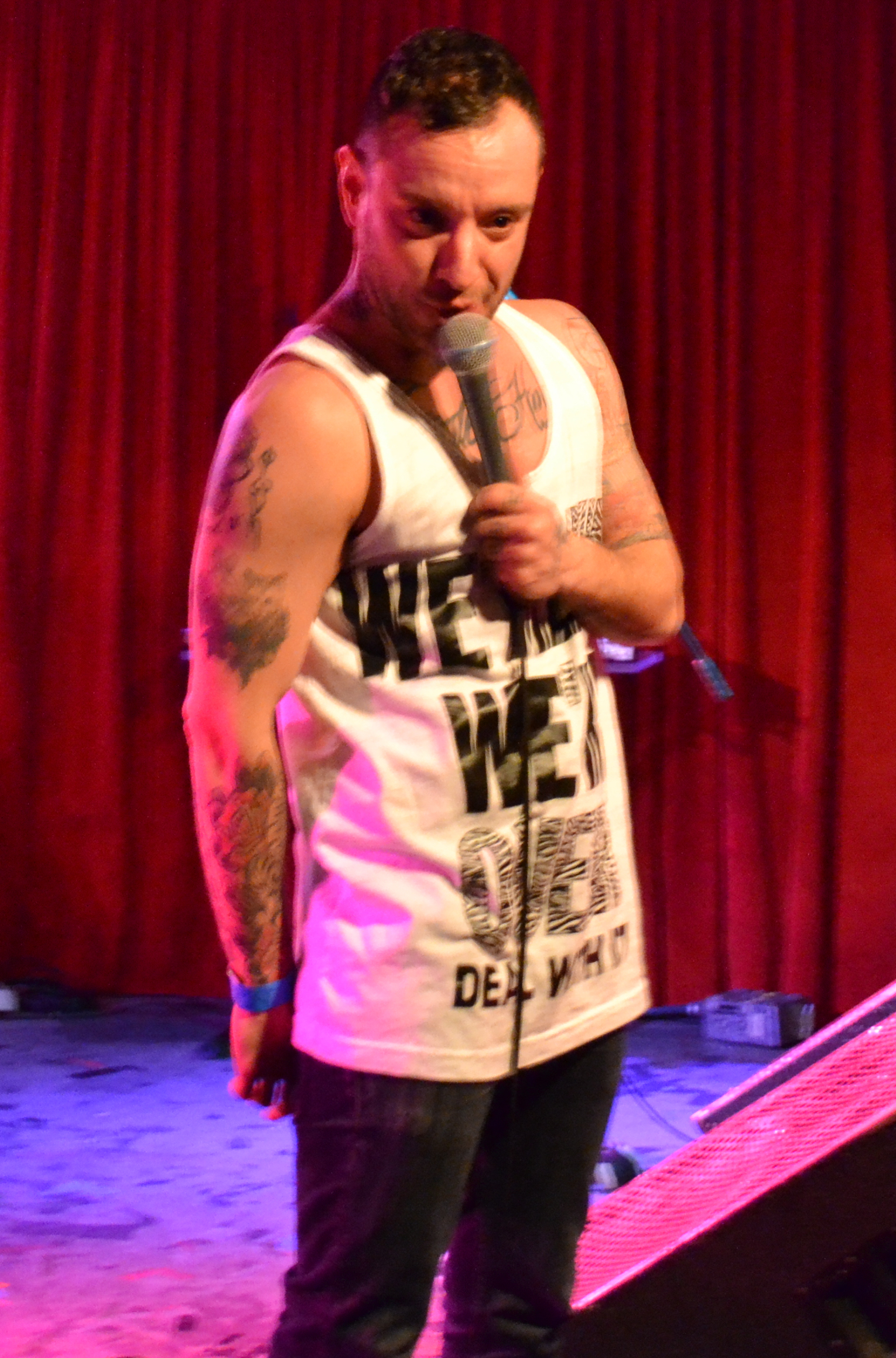
- Katastrophe at Grog Shop, Cleveland Heights, Ohio, 2011

Background information
- Born: October 2, 1979 (age 46)
- Genres: Hip hop
- Occupations: Rapper, record producer
- Years active: 1997–2014
- Labels: Knox; Cherchez La Femme; Sugartruck
- Website: roccokayiatos.com

Rocco Kayiatos, known professionally as Katastrophe and in some later releases as Rocco Katastrophe, is an American rapper.

Based in the San Francisco Bay Area, he began competing in poetry slams in 1997. After winning the 1998 Youth Speaks poetry slam, he went on tour with Sister Spit's Rambling Road Show tour. As a teenager, Kayiatos had poems on four compilation CDs.

He is widely credited as the first openly transgender singer in the hip-hop genre and he often incorporates his identity as a trans man into his work.

== Music career ==
In 2001, he recorded with Mark Schaffer the title song, Candyass, to the feature film Sugar High Glitter City, directed by Shar Rednour (who broached the project to Katastrophe on a Sister Spit tour) and Jackie Strano; the soundtrack was nominated for an AVN Award but lost to Snoop Dogg. Katastrophe and Schaffer then formed hip-hop group The End of the World along with Ricky Lee; Schaffer subsequently began performing solo as Schaffer the Darklord.

Katastrophe started making beats in 2002. He raps about lives lived outside the mainstreams of education, gender, and culture. He uses his struggle as a trans man and his contested place in contemporary queer and hip hop culture to discuss larger issues of community, space, privilege, sex, and self-worth.

He was named Producer of the Year by Outmusic Awards for his debut album Let's Fuck, Then Talk About My Problems on the Sugartruck Recordings label, released in 2004. In 2005, Kayiatos toured nationally with the Tranny Roadshow, a first of its kind, all transgender, touring variety show. Kayiatos released a second album entitled Fault, Lies and Faultlines on the Cherchez La Femme label in 2005, and a third full-length release, The Worst Amazing, was released in October 2009 on 307 Knox Records. In 2008 he wrote, produced, directed, and starred in a multimedia show, HomeMade SuperHero. He also performs with Jenna Riot as the music act Ice Cream Socialites.

He is featured in the documentary films Poetic License, Pick Up the Mic, Enough Man, and Riot Acts. He was described as one of the most accomplished rappers in the homo hop documentary Pick Up the Mic. His video for the song "The Life" was on MTV networks LOGO top ten Click List for 12 weeks. His music has been featured on Showtime's soundtracks for the contemporary series The L Word, as well as several short films. Kayiatos is the subject of a forthcoming biopic entitled The State of Katastrophe. He has toured in the U.S. and Europe.

== Publishing career ==
In October 2009, he and Amos Mac founded Original Plumbing, the first magazine by and for trans men.

== Post-musical Career ==
Kayiatos has held leadership positions at BuzzFeed and Grindr, is currently Chief Content Officer at FOLX Health, and co-creator and director of Camp Lost Boys, a sleep away summer camp "exclusively for adult men of trans experience."

== Discography ==
=== Albums ===
- 2004: Let's Fuck, Then Talk About My Problems (Sugartruck Recordings)
- 2005: Fault, Lies and Faultlines (Cherchez La Femme label)
- 2009: The Worst Amazing (307 Knox Records)
- 2012: Second Hand Emotion (307 Knox Records)

=== Videography ===
- 2007: "The Life" (Katastrophe feat. Shaggy Manatee & Ruby Valentine)
- 2012: "Sour Milk" (Tommy B, Brookside & Katastrophe)
- 2012: "Eat Everything" (Rocco Katastrophe feat. Margaret Cho, De=MC² and Athens Boys Choir)
- 2012: Second Hand Emotion including "Wake Me If I'm Dreaming" / "Let Me Go" (Rocco Katastrophe)
