= Deadlee =

American rapper

- Born: Joseph Lee
- Origin: Los Angeles, California, United States
- Genres: Hip-hop; homo hop
- Occupations: Rapper; songwriter
- Years active: 2000–present
- Labels: Clyde-n-Clyde; Bombastic
- Website: Official site; Official Myspace

Joseph Thomas Lee, better known by his stage name Deadlee, is an American rapper and songwriter. He is based in Los Angeles, California, is of Mexican American and African American descent, and launched his career in 2000. In 2002, he released his critically acclaimed first album 7 Deadlee Sins. The follow-up album, Assault With a Deadlee Weapon, was released in late 2006.

Deadlee is known for his lyrics, which tackle subjects such as race, class, sexuality and police brutality. On July 15, 2013, he changed his name to Joseph Thomas LeMar when he married his partner. The name is the combination of his last name and Martinez, the last name of his partner.

== Career ==
=== 2000–2005: 7 Deadlee Sins ===
Deadlee launched his career in 2000. In 2002, he released his first album 7 Deadlee Sins. A blend of hip-hop and thrash rock, his lyrics tackled subjects like race, class, sexuality and police brutality. The album became one of the first albums produced during the underground musical movement, "homo hop", which started in the early 2000s. He performed at a variety of music festivals including the "Peace Out Festival" in Oakland, California, "Peace Out East" in New York City, and "HomoAGoGo" in Olympia, Washington. The mainstream gay community did not accept his confrontational style during his first few years in the music industry. The "Long Beach Gay and Lesbian Pride Festival" grew larger and even restricted him from performing at the festival. As he became more synonymous with the growing homo hop scene, the LGBT community eventually accepted him and his music. Deadlee later performed at the "Los Angeles Latin Gay Pride Festival", the annual Christopher Street "West Los Angeles Pride" festival in West Hollywood, and the "San Francisco LGBT Pride" Main Stage two years afterwards.

=== 2006–2012: Assault With a Deadlee Weapon ===
Manager Camilo Arenivar (left) and Deadlee (right) in 2007.

After being involved in several motion picture soundtracks and documentaries, Deadlee released his second album in 2004, Assault With a Deadlee Weapon. Fueled with retaliatory attacks on rap and hip-hop's alleged homophobes such as Eminem, DMX and 50 Cent, the lyrics deal with LGBT issues and hardships that are recurring. Assault With a Deadlee Weapon has heavier production and a lot of support from fellow rappers and artists such as Johnny Dangerous, Tori Fixx, Salvi-Mex, Dutchboy, Barnes, Drastiko and Clint Catalyst. The music video for his song "Good Soldier II" has been played numerous times on the MTV-owned network Logo. To support Assault With a Deadlee Weapon, Deadlee toured with a number of other LGBT rappers on the "Homo Revolution" tour, managed by Camilo Arenivar.

In June 2009, Deadlee made four appearances in the prestigious Fresh Meat Festival, a trés moderne variety show spotlighting the cream of LGBT performers. He began with an angry spoken word piece written during a college tour, and moved into two classic Deadlee 2213 songs, the dance anthem "Nasty" and "Carnival in My Mind". Deadlee was acclaimed as both riveting and ferocious, surprising and astonishing the audience and proving himself a superb performer, able to bring the goods in any venue, gay or otherwise.

=== 2012–present: Turn to acting ===
Deadlee has made serious inroads into the movie industry as an actor, appearing in several films including the 'hood comedies', Hoochie Mamma Drama and Getting High in the Barrio. He also made an appearance as a homeless junkie in the Bruce LaBruce zombie thriller, L.A. Zombie, and as Pharmacy Punk in Rampart. He starred in Los Angeles' longest running play Eavesdropper. DEADLEE has shifted his focus to writing with a script for the upcoming satirical comedy CHOLO #1 based partially on his days auditioning in Hollywood. A new documentary AKA DEADLEE directed by Quentin Lee is slated for a 2023 release. DEADLEE is also host of the podcast "DEADLEE USA" where he formerly came out as an "America 1st Republican" supporting 2024 Republican candidate Vivek Ramaswamy.

== Public reception ==
He received considerable press coverage with articles or reviews in the now defunct QV magazine, LA Weekly, The Advocate, Frontiers magazine and Urb. In 2007, Deadlee was the subject of mainstream entertainment news, with publications like Rolling Stone and CNN, after he announced a spring tour called "HomoRevolution Tour 2007" and attacked Eminem, DMX, and 50 Cent as "homophobic". The tour was reported in the British Guardian newspaper and Deadlee appeared on The Tyra Banks Show with Tori Fixx and Foxxjazell.

Despite his notoriety as a controversial gay rapper, Deadlee has also contributed music to On the Downlow, directed by Tadeo Garcia, and Vengeance, directed by Daniel Zirilli. Both movies include songs from Assault with a Deadlee Weapon. Deadlee demonstrated his acting skills in Zirilli's gangbanger drama. He is member of the Screen Actors Guild. In 2006, he made film festival appearances in support of the homohop documentary, Pick Up the Mic, in which he appears. He also appears on the Logo network's documentary series, Hip Hop Homos.

== Discography ==
#	Title	Release date	Label	Format	Catalog
1	7 Deadlee Sins	2002	D&D Records	CD	
2	Assault With a Deadlee Weapon	August 15, 2006	Bombastic Records	CD; digital download	100546
