= God-Des and She =

American hip hop group

God-Des and She are an American hip-hop/pop/soul duo from the Midwest, composed of Alicia Smith (God-des) and Tina Gassen (She).

Since they appeared on the Showtime hit series The L Word in 2006, they have sold more than 30,000 albums and toured the world.

God-Des is currently home-based in Austin, Texas and has been a regular on the club scene there since 2004.

== Activism ==
A documentary about God-Des and She was released in 2014, entitled “God-Des & She: Never Give Up.” The film is named after one of their songs “Never Give Up” which is for children who are bullied and feel lost, and discusses affirming identities within the LGBTQIA+ community. The group is largely focused on activism within the LGBTQIA+ community, and wants to build an even bigger community in which they tackle the ever-growing problem of bullying. God-Des and She uses songs like “Never Give Up” as a platform to bring awareness, especially in schools. They believe there is not enough awareness especially within academic institutions, for far too many kids that identify as LGBTQIA+ have been severely threatened, bullied, and discriminated against. They hope to provide a curriculum to schools throughout the United States in order to educate teachers, faculty, and students about LGBTQIA+ issues and how to be allies.

== TV appearances ==
- Season 3 finale of The L Word, "Shane McCutcheon's Bachelor party"
- Logo channel's Hip hop Homo's documentary Pick Up The Mic
- ONE TV Show.com Episode 11

== Discography ==
Year	Title	Label
2004	Reality	God-Des & She Music
2005	Awesome EP	God-des & She Music
2007	Stand Up	God-Des & She Music
2009	Three	G & S Records
2009	United States of God-des & She	G & S Records

Nedra Johnson's song "Scooter Phat" features God-Des & She
