= Against Equality =

Queer organization

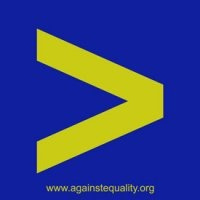
- The AE logo is a riff on the HRC logo signifying a greater than.
- Formation: October 2009
- Website: www.againstequality.org

Against Equality (AE) is an online archive founded in 2009 of writings and arts, and a series of books, by queer and trans writers that critique mainstream LGBT politics. AE has focused on issues regarding the institution of marriage, the U.S. military, and the prison-industrial complex via hate crime law.

== Structure ==
Against Equality is an anti-capitalist collective of radical queer and trans writers, thinkers, and artists. AE maintains an online archive of written work and cultural references. AE has also self-published three anthologies that highlight work from the three sections of their online archive. These three anthologies were combined into a single book and was published by AK Press in April 2014.

== Publications ==
AE published its first book in the fall of 2010. Against Equality: Queer Critiques of Gay Marriage contains essays and op-ed pieces by prominent queer thinkers, including Kate Bornstein, Eric A. Stanley, Dean Spade, Craig Willse, Kenyon Farrow, Kate Raphael, Deeg, John D'Emilio, Ryan Conrad, Yasmin Nair, MJ Kaufman, Katie Miles, and Mattilda Bernstein Sycamore. Against Equality: Queer Critiques of Gay Marriage ranked sixth on AK Press Distribution's Top 10 of 2010 list.

A.E published the second book, Against Equality: Don't Ask to Fight Their Wars, in the fall of 2011 and contains a collection of essays and illustrations critiquing the mainstream gay and lesbian politics and its uncritical approach to "don't ask, don't tell". Contributors include Mattilda Bernstein Sycamore, Kenyon Farrow, Cecilia Cissell Lucas, Yasmin Nair, Erica Meiners, Therese Quinn, Tamara K. Nopper, Larry Goldsmith, Jamal Rashad Jones, Bill Andriette, and illustrator Mr. Fish.

AE published the third and final book in its trilogy, Against Equality: Prisons Will Not Protect You, in the fall of 2012. This book focuses on hate crime law and the prison industrial complex. Contributors include Dean Spade, Jason Lydon, the Sylvia Rivera Law Project, Liliana Segura, Jack Aponte, Yasmin Nair, Imani Keith Henry, Sébastien Barraud, Erica Meiners, Liam Michaud, Josh Pavan, and Bridget Simpson.

AK Press released a three-in-one anthology titled Against Equality: Queer Revolution, Not Mere Inclusion in March 2014 that combines the collective's previous three anthologies and includes a new introduction from the collective.

== Events ==
Members of the Against Equality collective have also traveled extensively to speak at bookstores, community spaces, colleges, and universities across the United States, Canada, Europe, Australia, and New Zealand.

== See also ==
- Anarcho-queer
- Pink capitalism
- Gay Shame
- LGBT social movements
- Queercore
- Queeruption
- Gay Liberation
- Gay Liberation Front
- Human Rights Campaign, an LGBT-rights group with a similar logo
- Homotopia
