= Gay Shame =

Radical queer collective and movement

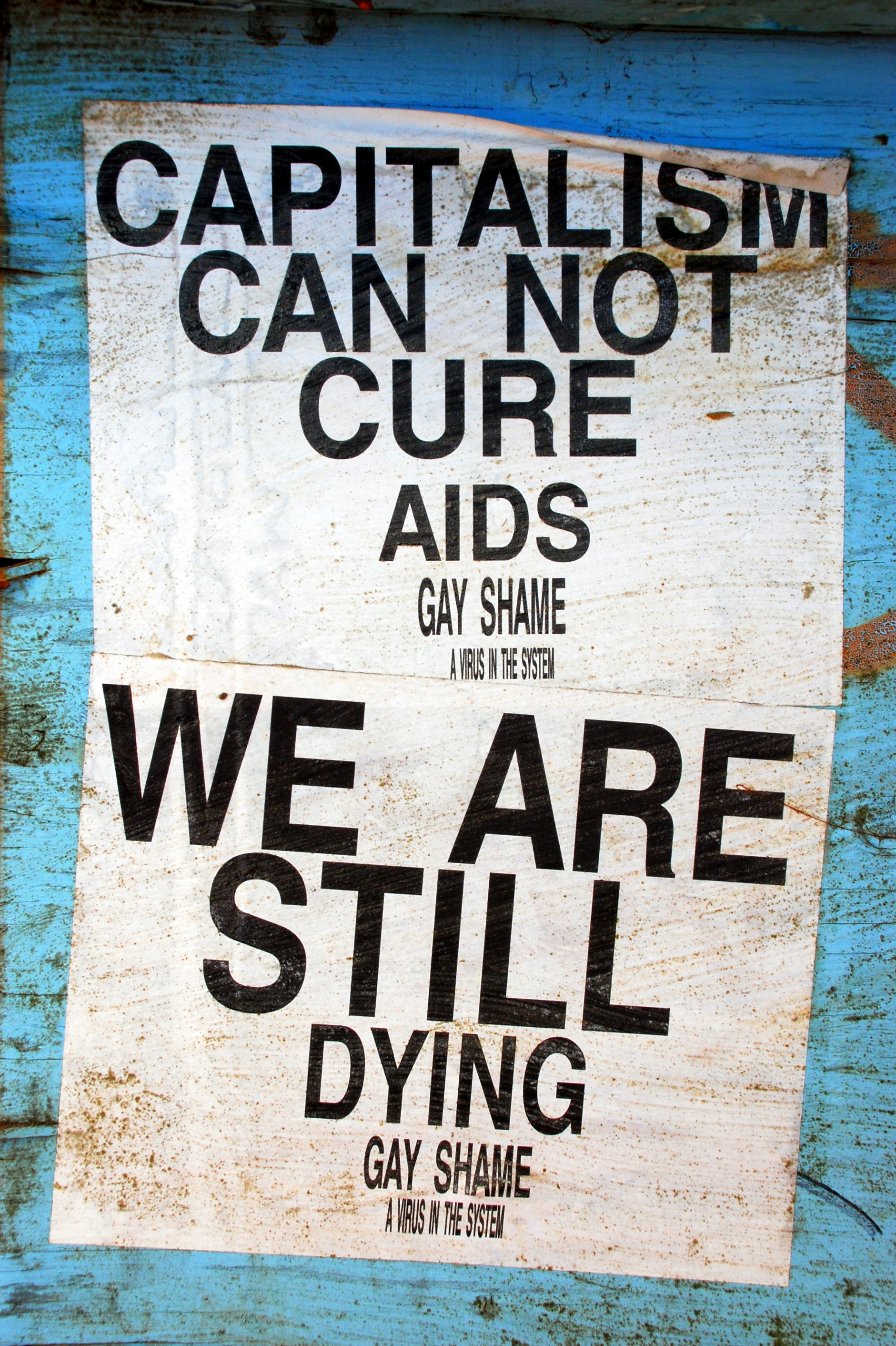
Gay Shame posters from 2007 with HIV/AIDS activist slogans

Gay Shame is a movement from within the queer communities described as a radical alternative to gay mainstreaming. The movement directly posits an alternative view of gay pride events and activities which have become increasingly commercialized with corporate sponsors as well as the adoption of more sanitized, mainstream agendas to avoid offending supporters and sponsors. The Gay Shame movement has grown to embrace radical expression, counter-cultural ideologies, and avant-garde art.

== Background ==
Gay Shame was created as a protest of (and named in opposition to) the over-commercialization of the gay pride events. Members attack "queer assimilation" into what they perceive as oppressive societal structures. As such, its members disagree with the legalization of same-sex marriage, stating that:

What we are calling for is an abolishment of State sanctioned coupling in either the hetero or homo incarnation. We are against any institution that perpetuates the further exploitation of some people for the benefit of others. Why do the fundamental necessities marriage may provide for some (like healthcare) have to be wedded to the State sanctioned ritual of terror known as marriage? […] Gay marriage and voting are symbolic gestures that reinforce structures while claiming to reconfigure them.

== History ==
Gay Shame began in 1998 as an annual event in Brooklyn, New York. It was held for a number of years at DUMBA, an artists' run collective center. Bands such as Three Dollar Bill and Kiki and Herb and speakers such as Eileen Myles, Mattilda Bernstein Sycamore and Penny Arcade appeared at the first event, and the evening was documented by Scott Berry and released as the film Gay Shame '98. Swallow Your Pride was a zine published by the people involved in planning Gay Shame in New York. Three issues were released. The movement later spread to San Francisco, Toronto, and Sweden.

LAGAI – Queer Insurrection (formerly Lesbians and Gays Against Intervention) put such a protest in context. They wrote that the "origins of the LGBTQ movement are revolutionary […]

In 2002, AlterNet published a piece by queer activist Tommi Avicolli Mecca who lived in San Francisco about Gay Shame. What he wrote expressed many of the ideas of Gay Shame:

...Gay Shame is an outgrowth of a younger generation's disgust with over-commercialized pride celebrations that are more about corporate sponsorships, celebrity grand marshals, and consumerism than they are about the radicalism that gave birth to our post-Stonewall gay-liberation movement, and radicalism such as that displayed by the Cockettes. Every movement undergoes changes in three decades, but pride, especially in Los Angeles, San Francisco and New York, transformed a street protest into a multi-million dollar extravaganza that has no political through line...thousands stand along the sidelines and cheer every corporate contingent that passes despite the fact that many of them, while good on gay rights, have policies and practices that oppress other groups...Many in my generation will find gay shame a hard pill to swallow, not unlike the word queer...But I like Gay Shame. It challenges us to ask important questions about what we've become as a community. Not everything we did was wrong; obviously, queers are an important part of the fabric of this country, thanks to the efforts of those who gave their lives to make it easier for all of us to live outside the closet. But no one back in the 70s could have imagined what a market niche we would become...This mass appeal and corporate sponsorship of our pride has been accompanied by a de-emphasis on politics. As more and more of corporate America gravitated toward pride, the "gay pride march" changed to a "parade" (or "celebration")...The Gay Shame folks will most certainly be dismissed as PC leftists who want to knock everything. Such a characterization will not make their criticisms go away.

In 2009, according to an article on IndyBay, SF Gay Shame had a protest outside San Francisco's LGBT Center. A press release they put out about the event they wrote:

GAY SHAME has uncovered shocking new truths! Upon studying the blueprints to the San Francisco LGBT Community Center, GAY SHAME has gathered evidence that it is in fact a portal to the 8th dimension. Cleverly disguised as a community center, familiar evil mega-corporate donors (ranging from Lennar to PG&E to Bechtel) and the San Francisco power elite, have been using their office park portal to suck away all our time, energy and passion...30 years after the White Night Riots and 40 years after Stonewall, radicals from splintering time periods and multiple movements without number shall join forces...This will be a high-concept anachronistic interpretive dance-off to determine the fate of radical queer politics!

That same year there was an event of London's chapter of Gay Shame, which they had a so-called "indoor playground of interactive art and alternative ideas...[which was in a] club [that] shares a similar non-commercial, anti-consumerist angle...[and there were] thirty-five sideshows, 100 performance artists and 3,000 revellers."

A book titled Gay Shame was reviewed on Lambda Literary in 2010. The reviewers noted that the book looks at the origins of Gay Shame, the question of gay pride and challenges readers to "question and explore the possibility that the modern LGBT rights movement's push for acceptance, assimilation, and—they would argue—pride, results in a loss of something importantly queer as it attempts to eradicate shame...[by] exploring the ways in which pride and shame connected with race, gender and sexuality."

In 2011, Mattilda Bernstein Sycamore was interviewed by an online publication called We Who Feel Differently. Carlos Motta, the interviewer asked about how to open up spaces, and in a response, Mattilda described her work with Gay Shame:

I was also involved with Gay Shame, a group that emerged in New York in 1998. Originally what we wanted to do was to create a radical alternative to "Gay Pride." Instead of having an endless gated procession of corporate floats, we thought we would just invite people for free into a space to share skills and strategies for resistance. We had bands, music, dancing and also people talking about welfare reform, trans liberation, or gentrification in New York. We thought we could make culture on our own terms...When I moved to San Francisco we started Gay Shame there along similar lines, it was a "direct action extravaganza"; we were committed to challenging the hypocrisy, not just of mainstream gay people but also of all hypocrites. We would throw together these very elaborate events like the "Gay Shame Awards" where we awarded the most hypocritical gay people for their service to the community. We had categories like "helping right wingers cope," "exploiting our youth," an "award for celebrities who should never have come out in the first place," etc. The award was a burning rainbow flag. What was really interesting about Gay Shame's actions, was that we wanted to create a spectacle. We wanted to create something that used the militancy of ACT UP, but fused it with spectacle, to focus on reclaiming the streets in an anti-capitalist, extravagant way, so that people would be drawn in.

Gay Shame was also mentioned on Mission Local, the Bay Area Reporter, writer Toshio Meronek on the Huffington Post, a radical magazine titled Slingshot, SF Weekly, Sarah Jaffe on Alternet, in a 7-page article in the Quarterly Journal of Speech and many others.

=== Fizzling out and the aftermath ===
The San Francisco Gay Shame became a non-hierarchical direct action and radical queer collective that continued until early 2013 when it petered out. It was also "primarily responsible for the protests, mobilizations, and guerrilla tactics that shut down the city of San Francisco in response to the declaration of war on Iraq". An interview posted on the Mission Local website noted that the group began organizing in 2001, doing radical direct action with ideas like the "Goth Cry-In" which they described as a "space for basking in our sadness around the current state of LGBT politics and the horrors of the larger world." The group also said that "the current state of LGBT politics is a scramble for straight privilege" and that "things like health care ... should be available to us all ... [but that] a queer identity is about challenging institutions of domination, like marriage and the military, not becoming part of them [because] ... we would be working against traditional institutions and building connections with people that make us feel love, joy, freedom and safety—which in many cases, as we know, is the exact opposite of marriage ... [since] Gay Shame supports gender self-determination in all its manifestations."

Their website described themselves as committed to "a queer extravaganza that brings direct action to astounding levels of theatricality [that rejects a] commercialized gay identity that denies the intrinsic links between queer struggle and challenging power ... counter[ing] the self-serving 'values' of gay consumerism and ... fighting the rabid assimilationist monster with a devastating mobilization of queer brilliance." Despite this, in 2012, according to writer Toshio Meronek, a criticism of the "corporatization of Pride events has officially gone viral ... [and] that Pride actually started as a day of political action called Christopher Street Liberation Day." At one point, after Don't Ask Don't Tell was repealed, Gay Shame put out a flier declaring: "No Gays in the Military! We need you on the streets. Keeping the status quo in check and on fire."

After the end of the last chapter of Gay Shame, there were some reflections on the movement as a whole. One of the main organizers, Mattilda Bernstein Sycamore, told the San Francisco Bay Guardian that:

... this activist group that meant so much to me, that challenged and inspired me in so many ways ... ultimately failed me. ... There is so much self-congratulatory rhetoric in San Francisco, especially in radical-identified queer spaces, and we’re never going to get to something beyond a cooler marketing niche unless we can examine the ways that so often in radical queer spaces people treat one another just as horribly as in dominant straight culture or mainstream gay culture, and it hurts so much more when this kind of viciousness comes from people you actually believe in.

This is similar to her remarks on a radio show in late October 2012 called Horizontal Power Hour.

In June 2013, an article on White Rose Reader added to this, noting that: "Starting in 1998, these “Gay Shame” events promoted counter-cultural ideologies and radical expression...some have picked up on this: a blog popped up recently to demand Gay Shame, started by a 48-year old queer male DJ."

=== Re-emergence ===
In September 2013, Gay Shame SF, or San Francisco Gay Shame, re-emerged. Gay Shame SF describes themselves as a 'Virus in the System," declaring a "new queer activism...to counter the self-serving "values" of gay consumerism and the increasingly hypocritical left." Organizationally, Gay Shame SF is consensus based, meaning everyone has to agree on decisions before they proceed and that they will make sure everyone is fully informed on the actions that are going to occur. When any member of the group speaks to the press, they will identify as 'Mary' so no one is seen as a leader, incorrectly identified and so that anonymity can be preserved.

Most recently, Gay Shame SF has attracted attention for its prison abolition and anti-gentrification organizing. In 2014, six members of Gay Shame were arrested for protesting a "prison-themed" pride party hosted by Kink.com. In an open letter co-signed by queer abolition leaders Miss Major and Angela Davis, Gay Shame demanded that Kink.com change the party's theme, and "not use themes of arrest and incarceration... in promoting your event." In 2015, a series of "anti-tech" fliers posted by Gay Shame in the Mission District, San Francisco, demanded 'Brogrammers' leave the neighborhood and implied violence.

Additionally, other chapters have emerged as well. In around May 2013, Gay Shame San Diego emerged, describing itself on a Facebook page as being "created as a protest to the over-commercialization of pride events and opposes queer assimilation." This Facebook page has covered topics ranging from same-sex marriage, Lou Reed, and gay pride. Around the same time, a Tumblr blog of the organization popped up as well repeating the same description on their Facebook page and it has been around ever since. This blog currently consists of reposted material written by Gay Shame SF, criticisms of capitalism, and discussions of topics like queer and trans liberation.

=== Criticism ===
Due to the opposition to mainstream LGBTQ culture, some have criticized Gay Shame. Another criticism, from a queer perspective, while praising the group in certain ways, commented: "...it is difficult for the group to wholly remove themselves from the overarching structure as their ideology demands..." By removing individual names, and by extent, individual identities within the group, Gay Shame conforms to the very commercialization it seeks to fight against."

== Academic conference ==
An academic conference at the University of Michigan Ann Arbor took place in March, 2003. Supposedly, during that weekend, there was friction between the activists and the academics, growing out of different strategies, and the activists' claim that the academics didn't do enough to acknowledge their power and class privilege, and to share more of that with the activists. A professor from the University of Texas adds to this account, reviewing a book called Gay Shame:

In 2003 the University of Michigan at Ann Arbor hosted a generative yet controversial conference titled Gay Shame. Seven years later, conference organizers David M. Halperin and Valerie Traub have compiled essays, spoken-word texts, art works, interviews, short documentary films, video performances, and images that were either inspired by, inspiration for, or a product of the conference proceedings in the anthology and accompanying DVD also titled Gay Shame. Most all of the diverse collection of contributions to the anthology and DVD were provided by the distinguished community of scholars, activists, and artists who attended the conference not only as presenters but also as active participants in the conversations it facilitated. Reflective of the vast scope of this book, the contributions are divided into six categories: "Gay Shame," which offers an introduction to both the conference and the volume; "Performing Shame," which examines shame as an affect produced and reflected through performance; "Spectacles of Shame," which considers imagery, both popular and erotic, that induces shame; "Disabled Shame," which explores shame in the lives of those living with disabilities; "Histories of Shame," which concerns shame in LGBTQ histories; and lastly "Communities of Shame," which examines shame and its relationship to identity politics.

== Events ==
The club night Duckie, run by Simon Casson and Amy Lamé in London, England, has run annual Gay Shame events since 1996. The events include performance art, live music, pageants, and typically have a theme with corresponding "dress code."

=== Duckie Gay Shame Themes ===
- 1996: Gay Shame & Lesbian Weakness
- 1997: (Un)Clean
- 2004: (Un)Fair
- 2005: The Suicides
- 2006: Euroshame; for EuroPride, the booths and shows themed as different European countries.
- 2008: Gay Shame Goes Macho
- 2009: Gay Shame Goes Girly
- 2014: Compulsory Entertainment
- 2015 National Borders (the plight of LGBTQ asylum seekers).
- 2018: The Light at the End of the Tunnel
- 2019: Lost
- 2021: Narcissus, Crumpet & Chippy
- 2022: Straight Pride
- 2023: Summer Fete
- 2024: Trans Daddy
- 2025: Dirty Thirty

From 2001 to 2004, there were Shame events in Stockholm, Sweden. As of 2026, Gay Shame SF meets every Saturday in the Mission district of San Francisco and online.

== See also ==
- Against Equality – Queer organization
- Bash Back! – Anarchist cells in the US
- Gay Liberation Front – Gay liberation groups in major US, UK, and Canadian cities during the 1960s-70s
- Gay liberation – Social and political movement in the 1960s and 70s
- Homotopia – 2007 short film
- LGBT social movements – Social identity movements
- Pink capitalism – Capitalist appropriation and assimilation of sexual diversity
- Pinkwashing (LGBT) – Promotional use of LGBTQ rights
- Queer anarchism – Anarchist school of thought
- Queer nationalism – Idea that the LGBTQ community is a nation in and of itself
- Queercore – Music genre and art movement
- Queeruption – Annual queercore festival
- Straight pride – Countermovement to LGBTQ+ pride movements and events
- Wrath month – Neologism and meme about LGBTQ+ activism occurring after Pride Month
