= Homotopia =

2007 short film

- Directed by: Eric Stanley; Chris Vargas
- Written by: Eric Stanley; Chris Vargas
- Release dates: May 19, 2007 (Inside/Out Toronto Gay and Lesbian Film Festival)
- Running time: 27 minutes
- Country: United States
- Language: English

Homotopia is a short film by Eric A. Stanley and Chris E. Vargas in 2007. The film addresses the politics of gay marriage, assimilation and highlights issues such as racism, colonialism, HIV/AIDS, and the state.

== Plot ==
Yoshi, the protagonist, falls in love with someone he meets in a park bathroom while reading Frantz Fanon's Black Skin, White Masks. Sadly, his new love interest is about to marry another man. Yoshi and his friends decide to stop the wedding from happening.

== Cast ==
- Jason Fritz Michael, a San Francisco-based performance/visual artist
- Susan Withans, a gender illusionist
- Kentaro J. Kaneko, also known for his work in Gay Shame
- Ralowe T. Ampu, former member of Deep Dickollective
- Mattilda Bernstein Sycamore

== Sequel ==
A sequel to Homotopia was created in 2013, titled Criminal Queers. The film is a "Prison-Break style comedy," meant as a commentary on the American prison system and its oppression of LGBTQ people. Angela Davis makes a cameo appearance in the sequel.

== See also ==
- Anarcho-queer
- Rainbow capitalism
- Gay Shame
- Bash Back!
- LGBT social movements
- Queer nationalism
- Queercore
- Queeruption
- Gay Liberation Front
