= Octant =

Octant may refer to:

- Octant (solid geometry), one of the eight divisions of 3-dimensional space by orthogonal coordinate planes
- Octant of a sphere, a spherical triangle with three right angles
- Octant (plane geometry), one eighth of a full circle
- Octant (instrument) for celestial navigation
- Octans, a constellation also called The Octant
- Octant (band), from Seattle, Washington
