= Bash Back! =

Anarchist cells in the US

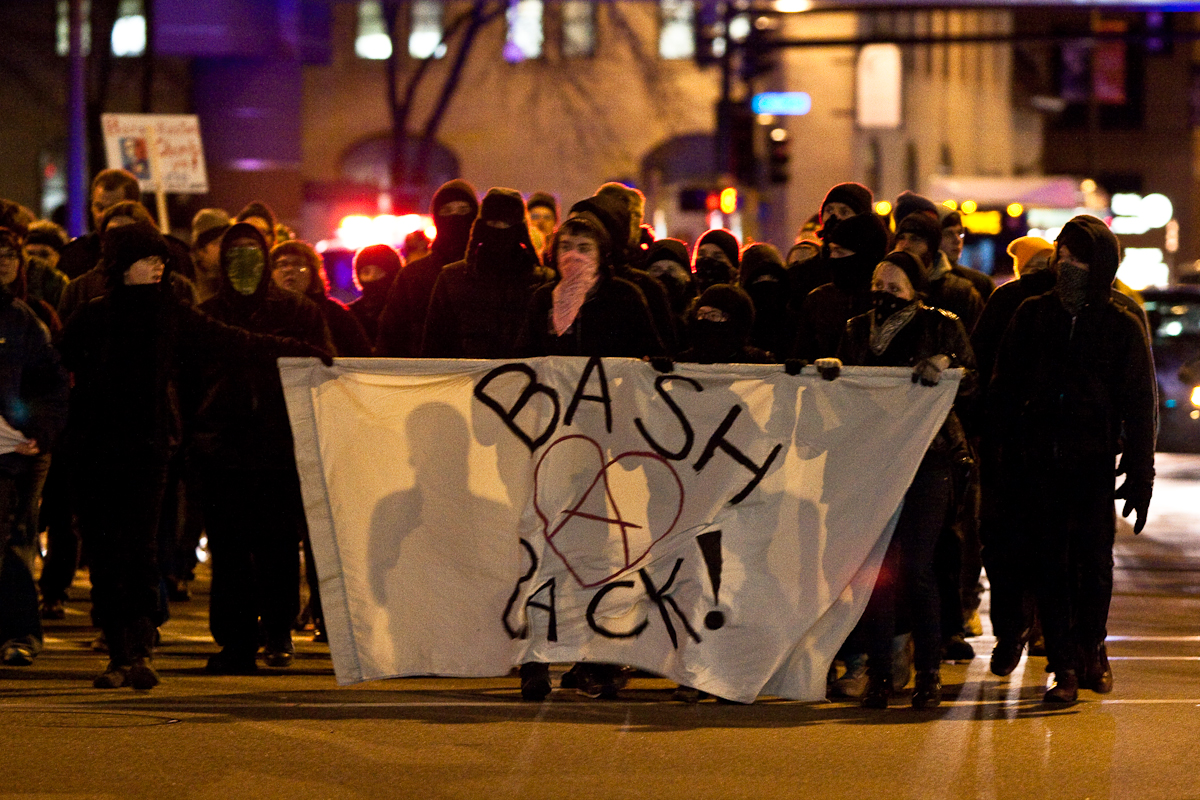
Bash Back marches in Minneapolis, 2009

Bash Back! was a network of queer insurrectionary anarchist cells active in the United States between 2007 and 2011.

Formed in Chicago in 2007 to facilitate a convergence of radical transgender and gay activists from around the country, Bash Back! sought to critique the ideology of the mainstream LGBTQ movement, which the group saw as assimilation into the dominant institutions of a heteronormative society. Bash Back! was noticeably influenced by the anarchist movement and radical queer groups, such as ACT UP, and took inspiration from the Stonewall and San Francisco's White Night riots.

The group arose out of anti–Republican National Convention and anti–Democratic National Convention organizing, and continued up to 2011. Chapters sprang up across the country, including in Philadelphia and Seattle. The organization's model was a nonhierarchical autonomous network based on agreed-upon points of unity, such as fighting for "queer liberation" rather than "heteronormative assimilation", and accepting a diversity of tactics, "including an individual’s autonomy to participate in actions deemed illegal by the government".

== Actions ==
Bash Back! Chicago carried out a number of actions during their city's Pride Weekend in 2008. The first was participation in the annual Chicago Dyke March in Chicago's Pilsen neighborhood. Bash Back!'s contingent in the march focused on resistance to gentrification in the Pilsen community. In addition, members of Bash Back! also took part in Chicago's larger Chicago Pride Parade. Bash Back! Chicago wheeled a cage through the parade containing a member dressed as Chicago's Mayor Richard M. Daley, whom the group charged was responsible for cutting AIDS funding, turning a blind eye to police torture and brutality, and supporting gentrification. Simultaneously, members of the group also distributed barf bags with slogans written on them such as "Corporate Pride Makes Me Sick," a statement about the commercial and assimilative intentions of mainstream gay culture.

A contingent from Bash Back! picketed in Lansing, Michigan, in November 2008 outside Mount Hope Church, a church that promoted anti-gay beliefs. Several members interrupted a worship service, unfurling a banner and showering fliers. In May 2009, Alliance Defense Fund filed a federal lawsuit against Bash Back! on behalf of the church, under the Freedom of Access to Clinic Entrances Act. The suit ended in 2011 with an agreement for the defendants to pay $2,750 in damages and refrain from future church demonstrations.

Bash Back dissolved by July 2011 due to internal politics.

In March 2023 a Bash Back! international convergence was announced and set to occur on September 8–11 of that year in Chicago, IL.

== See also ==
- Anarchism in the United States
- S.T.A.R.
- Gay Shame
- ACT UP
- OutRage!
- Homosexual Front for Revolutionary Action
- Gay Liberation Front
- Queer anarchism
- Queer Nation
- The Lesbian Avengers
- Best Revenge
