= Pride (LGBTQ culture) =

Positive stance toward LGBTQ people

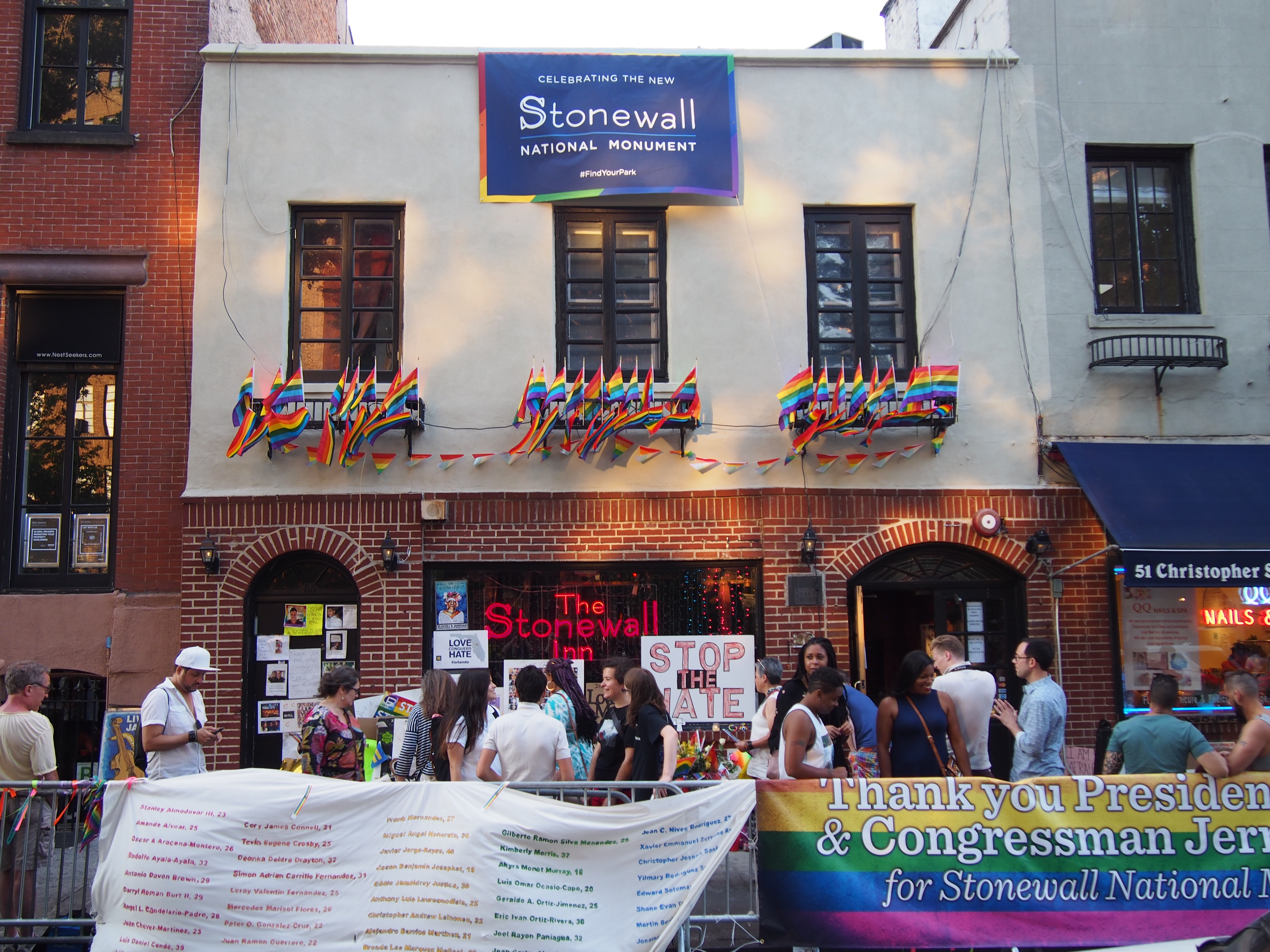
The Stonewall Inn in Greenwich Village, Manhattan, site of the June 1969 Stonewall riots, the cradle of the modern LGBTQ rights movement, and an icon of queer culture, is adorned with rainbow pride flags.

In the context of LGBTQ culture, LGBTQ pride (also known as queer pride, gay pride, or simply pride) is the promotion of the rights, self-affirmation, dignity, equality, and increased visibility of lesbian, gay, bisexual, transgender and queer (LGBTQ) people as a social group. Pride, as opposed to shame and social stigma, is the predominant outlook that bolsters most LGBTQ rights movements. Pride has lent its name to LGBTQ-themed organizations, institutes, foundations, book titles, periodicals, a cable TV channel, and the Pride Library.

Ranging from solemn to carnivalesque, pride events are typically held during LGBTQ Pride Month or some other period that commemorates a turning point in a country's LGBTQ history; one example is Moscow Pride, which is held every May for the anniversary of Russia's 1993 decriminalization of homosexuality. Some pride events include Pride parades and marches, rallies, commemorations, community days, dance parties, and festivals.

Common symbols of pride include the rainbow flag and other pride flags, the lowercase Greek letter lambda (λ), the pink triangle and the black triangle, these latter two reclaimed from use as badges of shame in Nazi concentration camps.

== Terminology origins ==
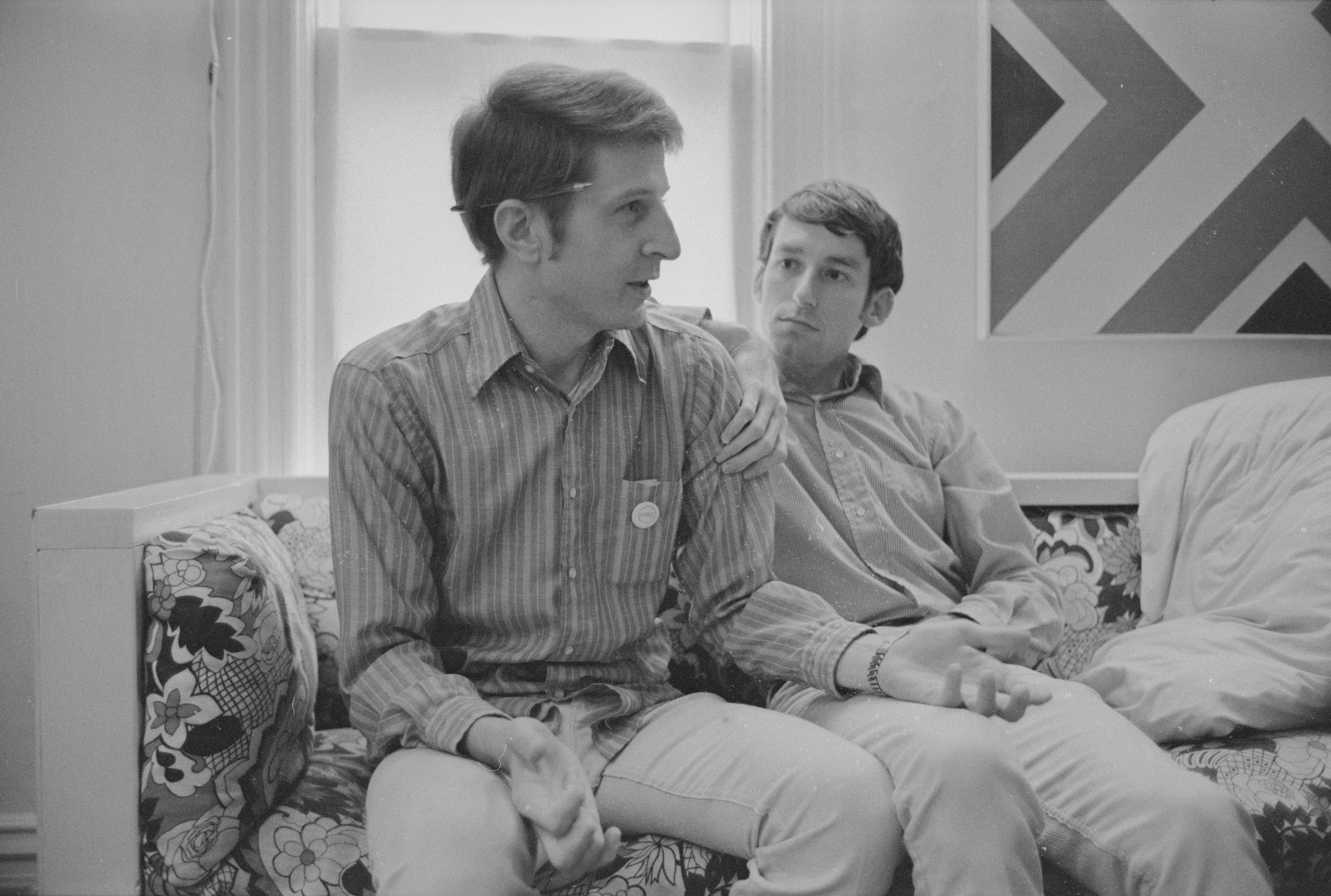
Baker and McConnell (r) at their Minneapolis home, 1970

In the earlier decades of the 20th century before the term "Pride" became widely used, gatherings and protests by the LGBTQ community were often referred to as Homophile demonstrations; this reflected a more conservative and assimilationist approach to LGBTQ rights. As the movement became more radical in the late 1960s, particularly after the Stonewall Uprising, they were called Gay Liberation marches or rallies which emphasized demands for full equality and liberation.

The term "Gay Pride" was claimed to be coined either by Jack Baker and Michael McConnell, an activist couple in Minnesota, or by Thom Higgins, another gay rights activist in Minnesota. Higgins, a former member of the Catholic Church, sought to combat the negative energy emanating from the institution. Higgins paired one of the seven deadly sins, "pride", with "gay" due to the church's stance on same-sex behaviors as going against divine and natural laws. "That language was transformative", McConnell said. This approach not only opened doors but also propelled individuals forward. In 1971, McConnell introduced the term "gay pride" in Chicago, setting off a powerful movement.

Brenda Howard along with the bisexual activist Robert A. Martin (aka Donny the Punk) and gay activist L. Craig Schoonmaker are credited with popularizing the word "Pride" to describe these festivities.

== Historical background ==
=== Pride precursors ===
Karl Heinrich Ulrichs was one of the first openly gay activists and is considered a predecessor of the LGBTQ pride movement.

==== Annual Reminders ====
The 1950s and 1960s in the United States constituted an extremely repressive legal and social period for LGBTQ people. In this context American homophile organizations such as the Daughters of Bilitis and the Mattachine Society coordinated some of the earliest demonstrations of the modern LGBTQ rights movement. These two organizations in particular carried out pickets called "Annual Reminders" to inform and remind Americans that LGBTQ people did not receive basic civil rights protections. Annual Reminders began in 1965 and took place each July 4 at Independence Hall in Philadelphia.

==== "Gay is Good" ====
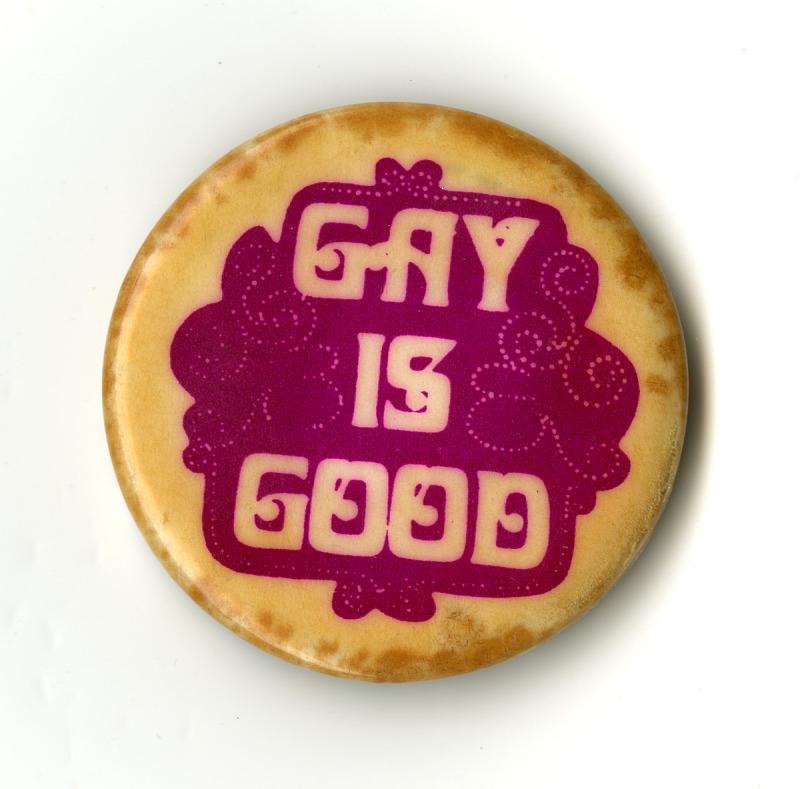
"Gay is Good" button, 1963

The anti-LGBTQ discourse of these times equated both male and female homosexuality with mental illness. Inspired by Stokely Carmichael's "Black is Beautiful", gay civil rights pioneer and participant in the Annual Reminders Frank Kameny originated the slogan "Gay is Good" in the early 1960s to counter social stigma and personal feelings of guilt and shame.

=== Christopher Street Liberation Day ===
Early on the morning of Saturday, June 28, 1969, lesbian, gay, bisexual, and transgender persons rioted following a police raid on the Stonewall Inn, a gay bar at 43 Christopher Street in Greenwich Village, Manhattan, New York City. This riot and further protests and rioting over the following nights were the watershed moment in the modern LGBTQ rights movement and the impetus for organizing LGBTQ pride marches on a much larger public scale.

On November 2, 1969, Craig Rodwell, his partner Fred Sargeant, Ellen Broidy, and Linda Rhodes proposed the first pride march to be held in New York City by way of a resolution at the Eastern Regional Conference of Homophile Organizations (ERCHO) meeting in Philadelphia.

That the Annual Reminder, in order to be more relevant, reach a greater number of people, and encompass the ideas and ideals of the larger struggle in which we are engaged—that of our fundamental human rights—be moved both in time and location.

We propose that a demonstration be held annually on the last Saturday in June in New York City to commemorate the 1969 spontaneous demonstrations on Christopher Street and this demonstration be called CHRISTOPHER STREET LIBERATION DAY. No dress or age regulations shall be made for this demonstration.

We also propose that we contact Homophile organizations throughout the country and suggest that they hold parallel demonstrations on that day. We propose a nationwide show of support.

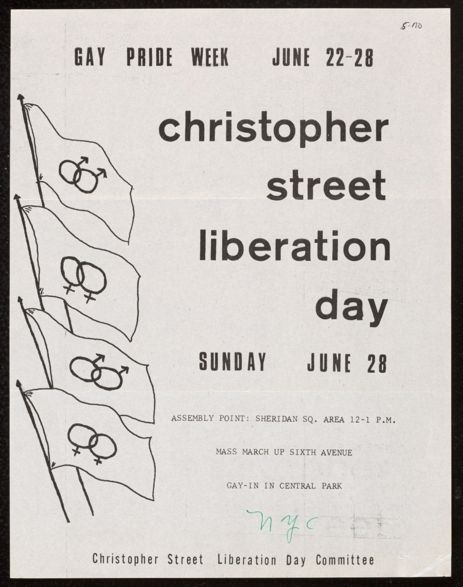
Christopher Street Liberation Day flyer, 1970

All attendees to the ERCHO meeting in Philadelphia voted for the march except for Mattachine Society of New York, which abstained. Members of the Gay Liberation Front (GLF) attended the meeting and were seated as guests of Rodwell's group, Homophile Youth Movement in Neighborhoods (HYMN).

Meetings to organize the march began in early January at Rodwell's apartment in 350 Bleecker Street. At first there was difficulty getting some of the major New York City organizations like Gay Activists Alliance (GAA) to send representatives. Craig Rodwell and his partner Fred Sargeant, Ellen Broidy, Michael Brown, Marty Nixon, and Foster Gunnison Jr. of Mattachine made up the core group of the CSLD Umbrella Committee (CSLDUC). For initial funding, Gunnison served as treasurer and sought donations from the national homophile organizations and sponsors, while Sargeant solicited donations via the Oscar Wilde Memorial Bookshop customer mailing list and Nixon worked to gain financial support from GLF in his position as treasurer for that organization. Other mainstays of the organizing committee were Judy Miller, Jack Waluska, Steve Gerrie and Brenda Howard of GLF. Believing that more people would turn out for the march on a Sunday, and so as to mark the date of the start of the Stonewall uprising, the CSLDUC scheduled the date for the first march for Sunday, June 28, 1970. With Dick Leitsch's replacement as president of Mattachine NY by Michael Kotis in April 1970, opposition to the march by Mattachine ended.

There was little open animosity, and some bystanders applauded when a tall, pretty girl carrying a sign "I am a Lesbian" walked by. – The New York Times coverage of Gay Liberation Day, 1970

Christopher Street Liberation Day on June 28, 1970, marked the first anniversary of the Stonewall riots with the march, which was the first Gay Pride march in New York history, and covered the 51 blocks to Central Park. The march took less than half the scheduled time due to excitement, but also due to wariness about walking through the city with gay banners and signs. Although the parade permit was delivered only two hours before the start of the march, the marchers encountered little resistance from onlookers. The New York Times reported (on the front page) that the marchers took up the entire street for about 15 city blocks. Reporting by The Village Voice was positive, describing "the out-front resistance that grew out of the police raid on the Stonewall Inn one year ago". There was also an assembly on Christopher Street.

=== Spread ===
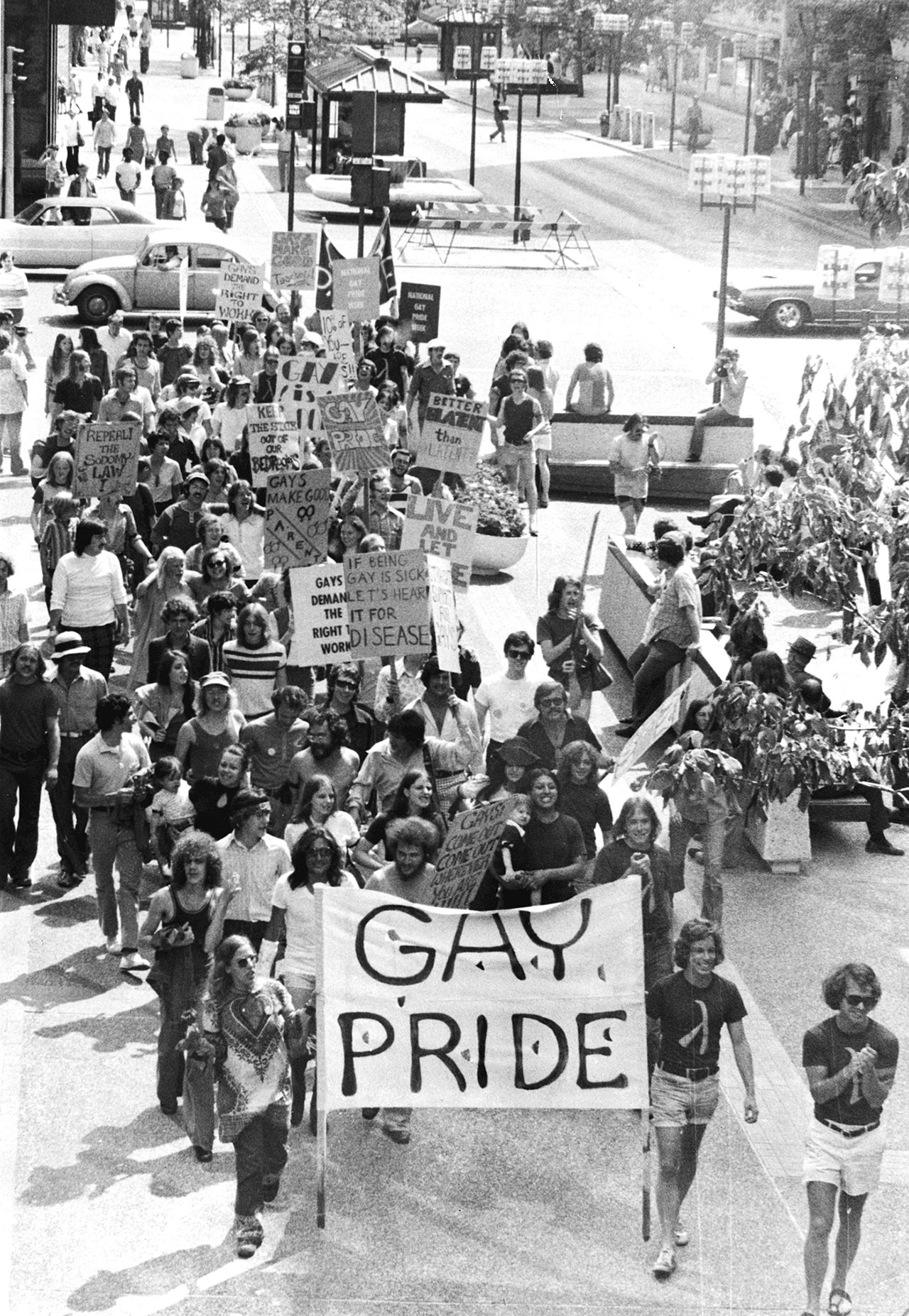
1973 celebrations end with a Gay Pride March in Downtown Minneapolis.

On Saturday, June 27, 1970, Chicago Gay Liberation organized a march from Washington Square Park ("Bughouse Square") to the Water Tower at the intersection of Michigan and Chicago avenues, which was the route originally planned, and then many of the participants extemporaneously marched on to the Civic Center (now Richard J. Daley) Plaza. The date was chosen because the Stonewall events began on the last Saturday of June and because organizers wanted to reach the maximum number of Michigan Avenue shoppers. Subsequent Chicago parades have been held on the last Sunday of June, coinciding with the date of many similar parades elsewhere. Subsequently, during the same weekend, gay activist groups on the West Coast of the United States held a march in Los Angeles and a march and "Gay-in" in San Francisco.

The next year, Gay Pride marches took place in Boston, Dallas, Milwaukee, London, Paris, West Berlin, and Stockholm. By 1972 the participating cities included Atlanta, Brighton, Buffalo, Detroit, Washington D.C., Miami, and Philadelphia, as well as San Francisco.

Frank Kameny soon realized the pivotal change brought by the Stonewall riots. An organizer of gay activism in the 1950s, he was used to persuasion, trying to convince heterosexuals that gay people were no different from themselves. When he and other people marched in front of the White House, the State Department and Independence Hall five years earlier, their objective was to look as if they could work for the U.S. government. Ten people marched with Kameny then, and they alerted no press to their intentions. Although he was stunned by the upheaval by participants in the Annual Reminder in 1969, he later observed, "By the time of Stonewall, we had fifty to sixty gay groups in the country. A year later there were at least fifteen hundred. By two years later, to the extent that a count could be made, it was twenty-five hundred."

Similar to Kameny's regret at his own reaction to the shift in attitudes after the riots, Randy Wicker came to describe his embarrassment as "one of the greatest mistakes of his life". The image of gays retaliating against police, after so many years of allowing such treatment to go unchallenged, "stirred an unexpected spirit among many homosexuals". Kay Lahusen, who photographed the marches in 1965, stated, "Up to 1969, this movement was generally called the homosexual or homophile movement... Many new activists consider the Stonewall uprising the birth of the gay liberation movement. Certainly it was the birth of gay pride on a massive scale."

=== 1980s and 1990s ===
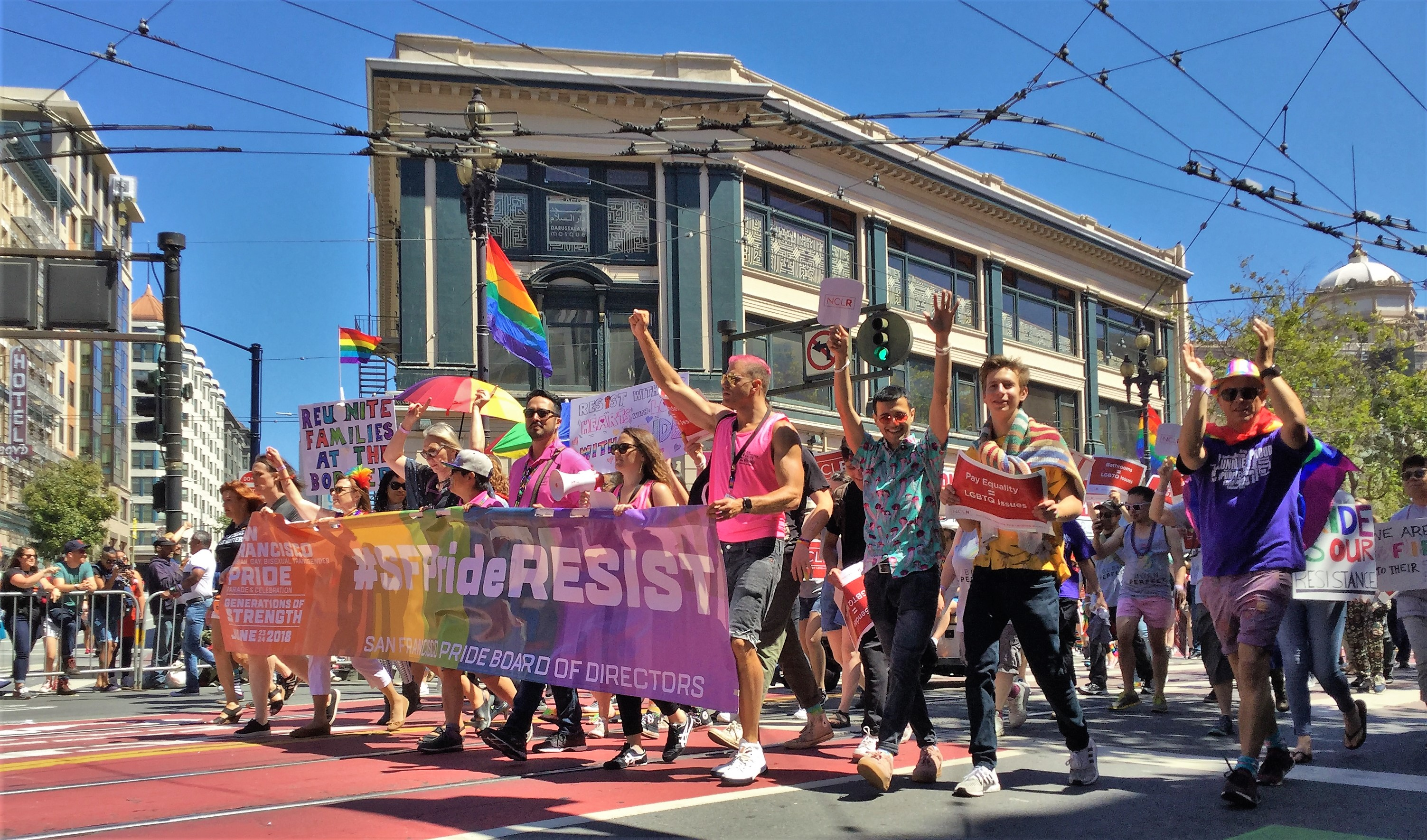
San Francisco Pride 2018

In the 1980s there was a major cultural shift in the Stonewall Riot commemorations. The previous more loosely organized, grassroots marches and parades were taken over by more organized and less radical elements of the gay community. The marches began dropping "Liberation" and "Freedom" from their names under pressure from more conservative members of the community, replacing them with the philosophy of "Gay Pride" (in San Francisco, the name of the gay parade and celebration was not changed from Gay Freedom Day Parade to Gay Pride Day Parade until 1994). The Greek lambda symbol and the pink triangle, which had been revolutionary symbols of the Gay Liberation Movement, were tidied up and incorporated into the Gay Pride, or Pride, movement, providing some symbolic continuity with its more radical beginnings. The pink triangle was also the inspiration for the homomonument in Amsterdam, commemorating all gay men and lesbians who have been subjected to persecution because of their homosexuality.

=== Pride Month ===
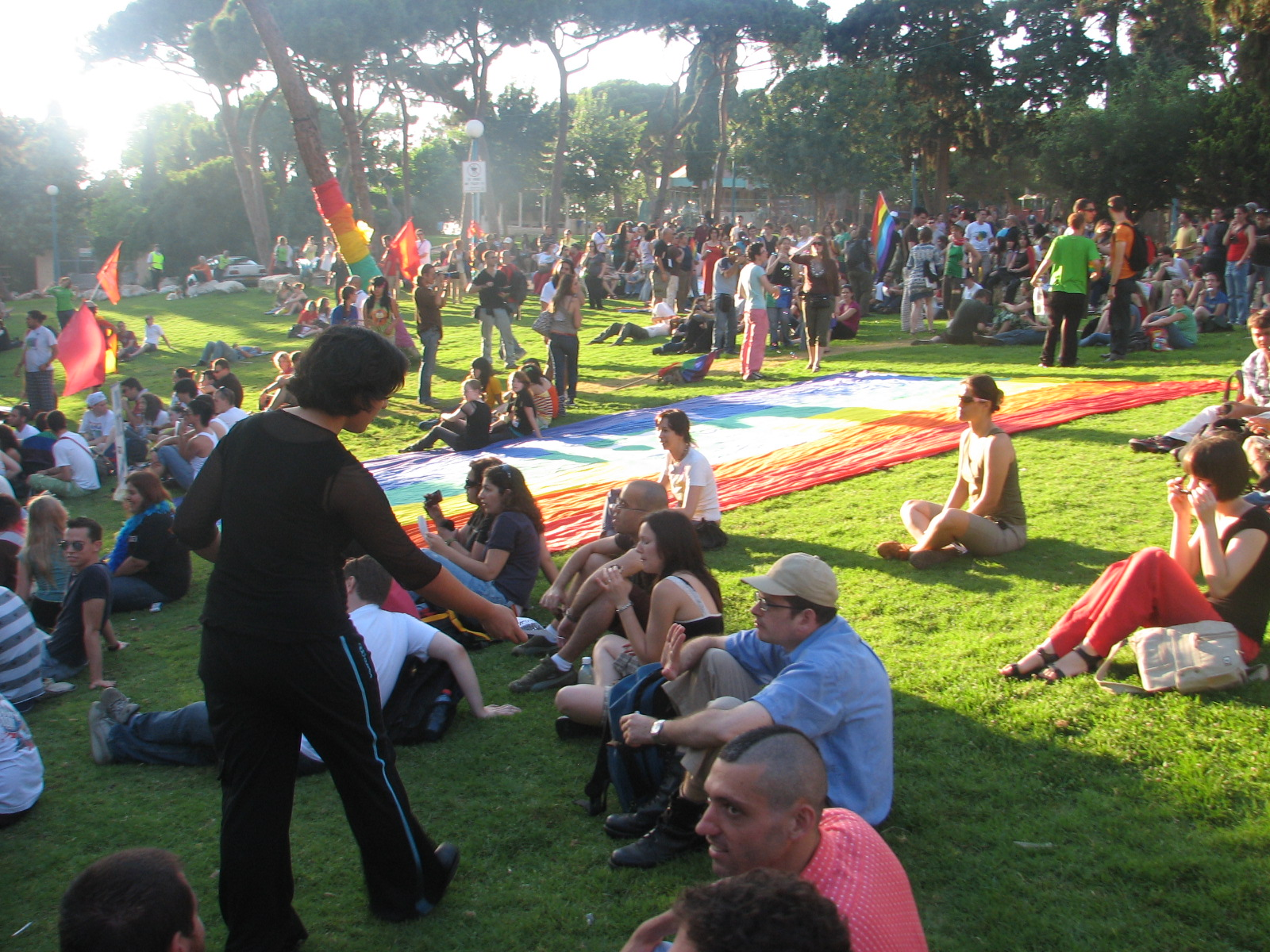
HBT rally in Carmel, Haifa, Israel

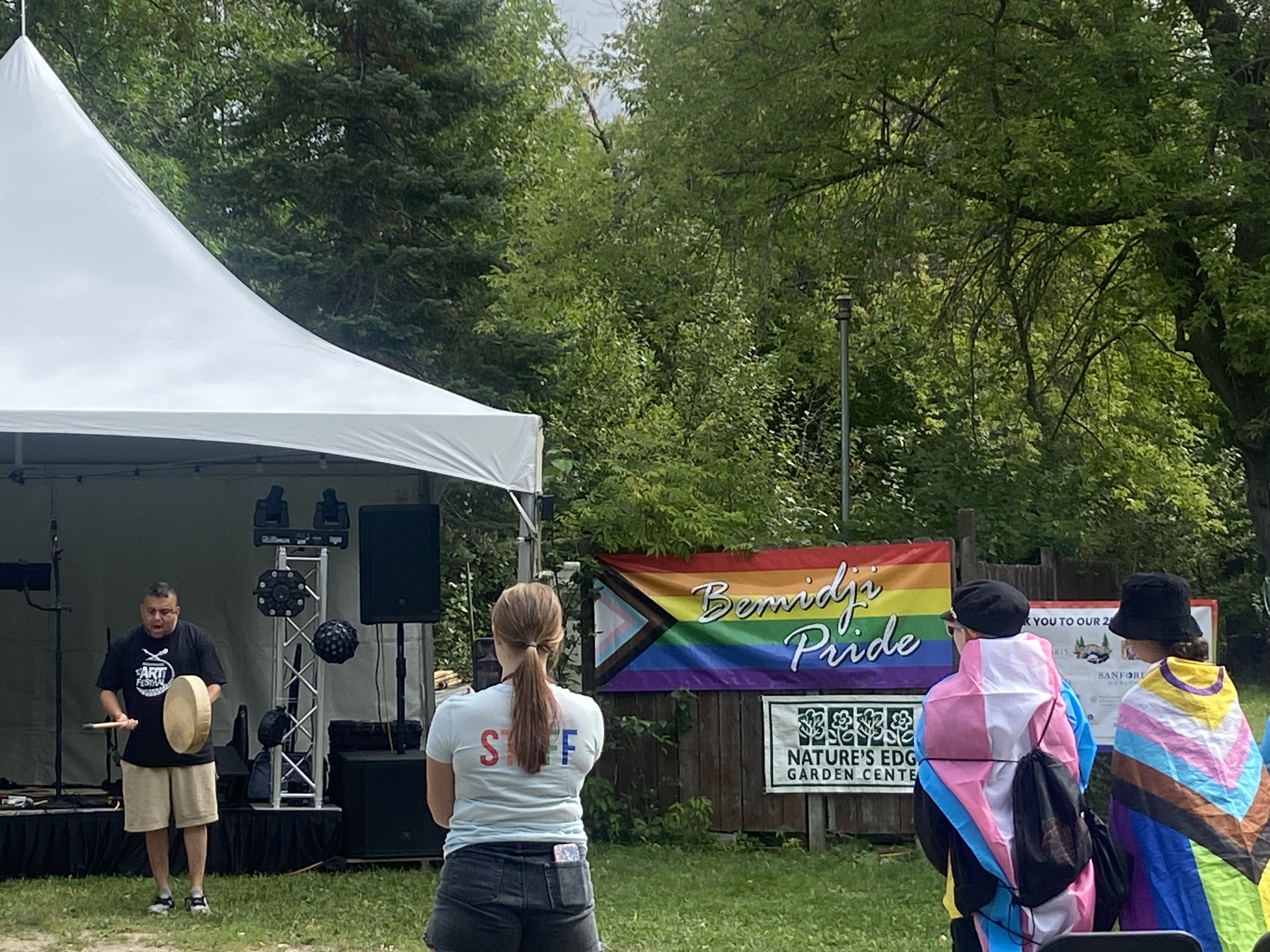
Native drum ceremony at pride festival opening, Bemidji, Minnesota

Pride Month occurs in the United States to commemorate the Stonewall riots, which occurred at the end of June 1969. As a result, many pride events are held during this month to recognize the impact LGBTQ people have had in the world.

I call upon all Americans to observe this month by fighting prejudice and discrimination in their own lives and everywhere it exists. – Proclamation 8529 by U.S President Barack Obama, May 28, 2010

Three presidents of the United States have officially declared a pride month. First, President Bill Clinton declared June "Gay & Lesbian Pride Month" in 1999 and 2000. Then from 2009 to 2016, each year he was in office, President Barack Obama declared June LGBTQ Pride Month. Later, President Joe Biden declared June LGBTQ Pride Month in 2021. Donald Trump became the first Republican president to acknowledge LGBTQ Pride Month in 2019. However, he did so through tweeting rather than an official proclamation; the tweet was later released as an official "Statement from the President."

Beginning in 2012, Google displayed some LGBTQ-related search results with different rainbow-colored patterns each year during June. In 2017, Google also included rainbow-coloured streets on Google Maps to display Gay Pride marches occurring across the world.

At many colleges, which are not in session in June, LGBTQ pride is instead celebrated during April, which is dubbed "Gaypril".

Pride month is not recognized internationally as pride celebrations take place in many other places at different times, including in the months of February, August, and September. In Canada, Pride Season refers to the wide array of Pride events held from June to September. In other countries like the United States, the month of June is recognized as Pride Month whereas in Canada, it's a full season.

For the first time in the history of an Arab monarchy, diplomatic embassies in the United Arab Emirates supported the LGBTQ community by raising the rainbow flag to celebrate Pride Month 2021. The UK embassy in the UAE posted a picture on Twitter of the Pride flag alongside the Union Jack, affirming their "pride in the UK's diversity and our values of equality, inclusion and freedom". The US embassy in the Emirates also posted a picture of the flying American and Pride flags on its Abu Dhabi residence, stating that it supported "dignity and equality of all people". While the move was remarkable, it faced backlash online and was extensively criticized by the locals over social media. Many called it "disrespectful" and "insulting".

The term Wrath Month, which started as a Twitter meme in 2018, eventually came to be used by some as a response to the perceived tameness of Pride Month.

=== Rainbow/Pride flag ===
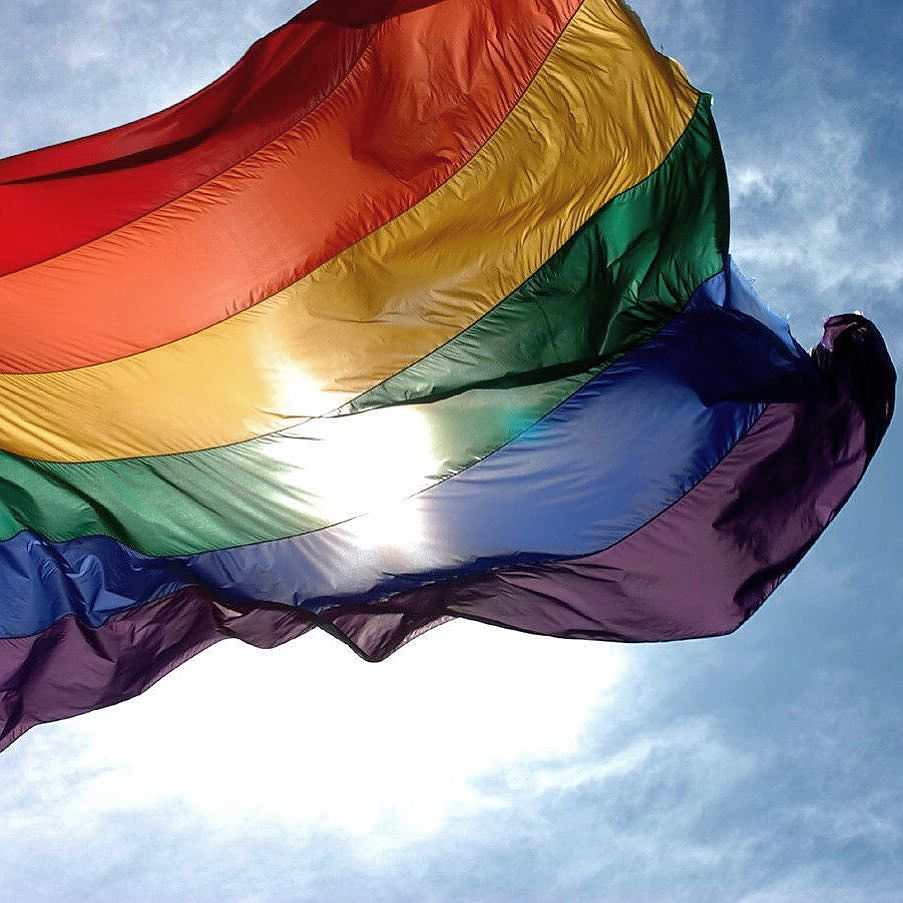
Six-striped pride flag

The rainbow flag, also known as the pride flag, is a symbol of lesbian, gay, bisexual, transgender, and queer (LGBTQ) pride and social movements. The most common variant consists of six horizontal stripes of red, orange, yellow, green, blue, and violet. Designed in 1978 by artist Gilbert Baker, the flag's colors were originally eight and had specific meanings in relation to the LGBTQ community. The design has undergone revisions over the years, but it remains a widely recognized symbol of LGBTQ identity and activism.

== Criticism ==
From both outside and inside LGBTQ communities, there is criticism and protest against pride events. Bob Christie's documentary Beyond Gay: The Politics of Pride evaluates gay pride events in different countries within the context of local opposition.

=== Initiatives and criticism by governments and political leaders ===
==== Brazil ====
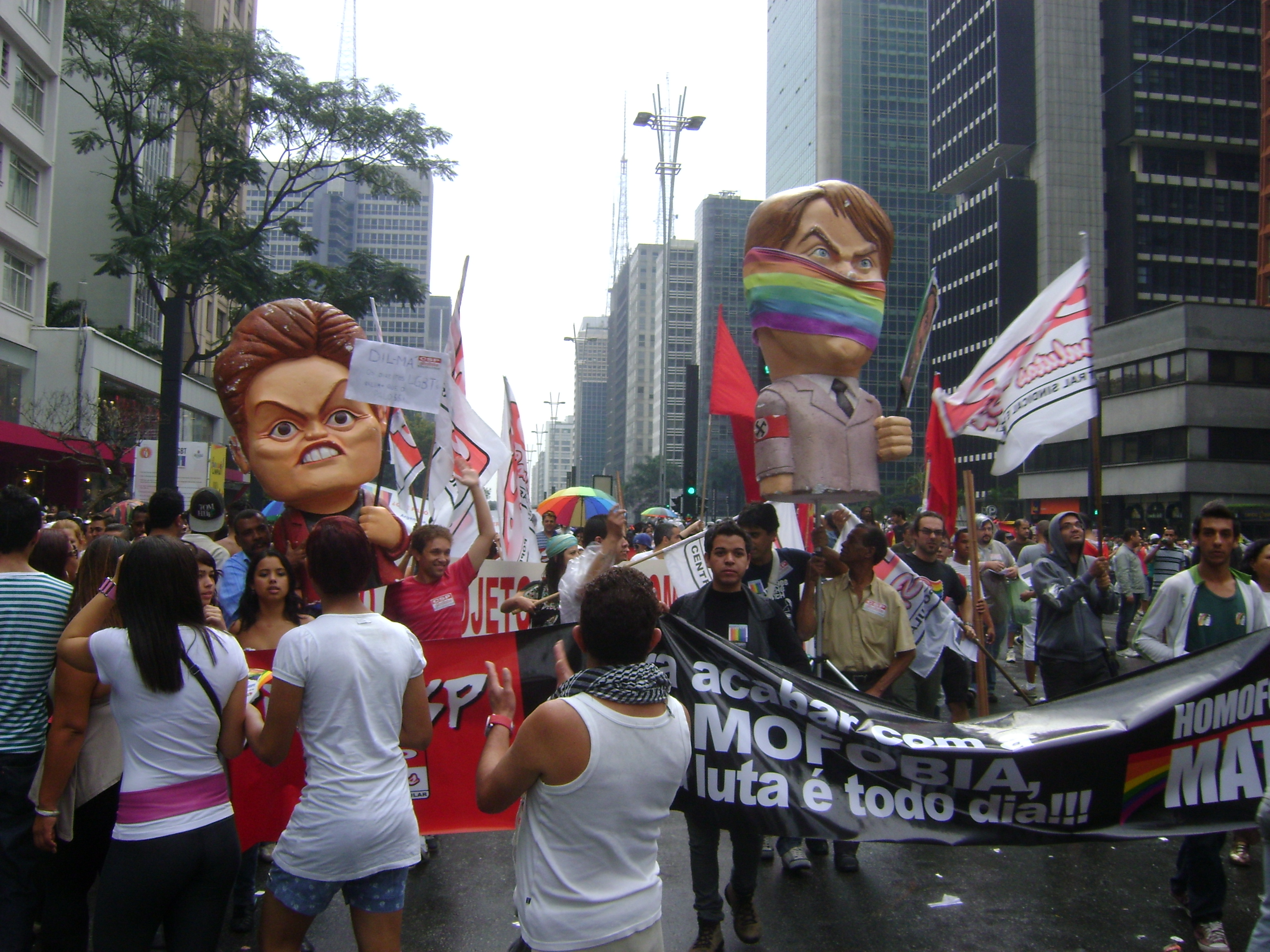
Gay Pride in São Paulo. The LGBTQ-related magazine The Advocate has called Jair Bolsonaro "Brazil's biggest homophobe".

In August 2011, São Paulo city alderman Carlos Apolinário of the right-wing Democrats Party sponsored a bill to organize and sponsor "Heterosexual Pride Day" on the third Sunday of December. Apolinário, an Evangelical Protestant, stated that the intent of the parade was a "struggle ... against excesses and privileges". Members of Gay Group of Bahia and the Workers' Party opposed the bill as enhancing "the possibility of discrimination and prejudice". The bill was nevertheless passed by the city council, but never received the signature of mayor Gilberto Kassab.

A Brazilian photographer was arrested after refusing to delete photos of police attacking two young people participating in a gay pride parade on October 16, 2011, in the city of Itabuna, Bahia, reported the newspaper Correio 24 horas. According to the website Notícias de Ipiau, Ederivaldo Benedito, known as Bené, said four police officers tried to convince him to delete the photos soon after they realized they were being photographed. When he refused, they ordered him to turn over the camera. When the photographer refused again, the police charged him with contempt and held him in jail for over 21 hours until he gave a statement. According to Chief Marlon Macedo, the police alleged that the photographer was interfering with their work, did not have identification, and became aggressive when he was asked to move. Bené denied the allegations, saying the police were belligerent and that the scene was witnessed by "over 300 people", reported Agência Estado.

==== Spain ====
In a 2008 interview for the biography La Reina muy cerca (The Queen Up Close), by Spanish journalist and writer Pilar Urbano, Queen Sofía of Spain sparked controversy by voicing her disapproval of LGBTQ pride. This was in addition to overstepping her official duties as a member of the Royal Family by censoring the Spanish Law on Marriage in how it names same-sex unions as "matrimonio" (marriage). Without using the slogan "Straight Pride", Queen Sofía was directly quoted as saying that if heterosexuals were to take the streets as the LGBTQ community does for Gay Pride parades, that the former collective would bring Madrid to a standstill.

Even though the Royal Household of Spain approved publication of the interview and Pilar Urbano offered to share the interview recording, both Queen Sofía and the Royal Household have refuted the comments in question.

==== Turkey ====
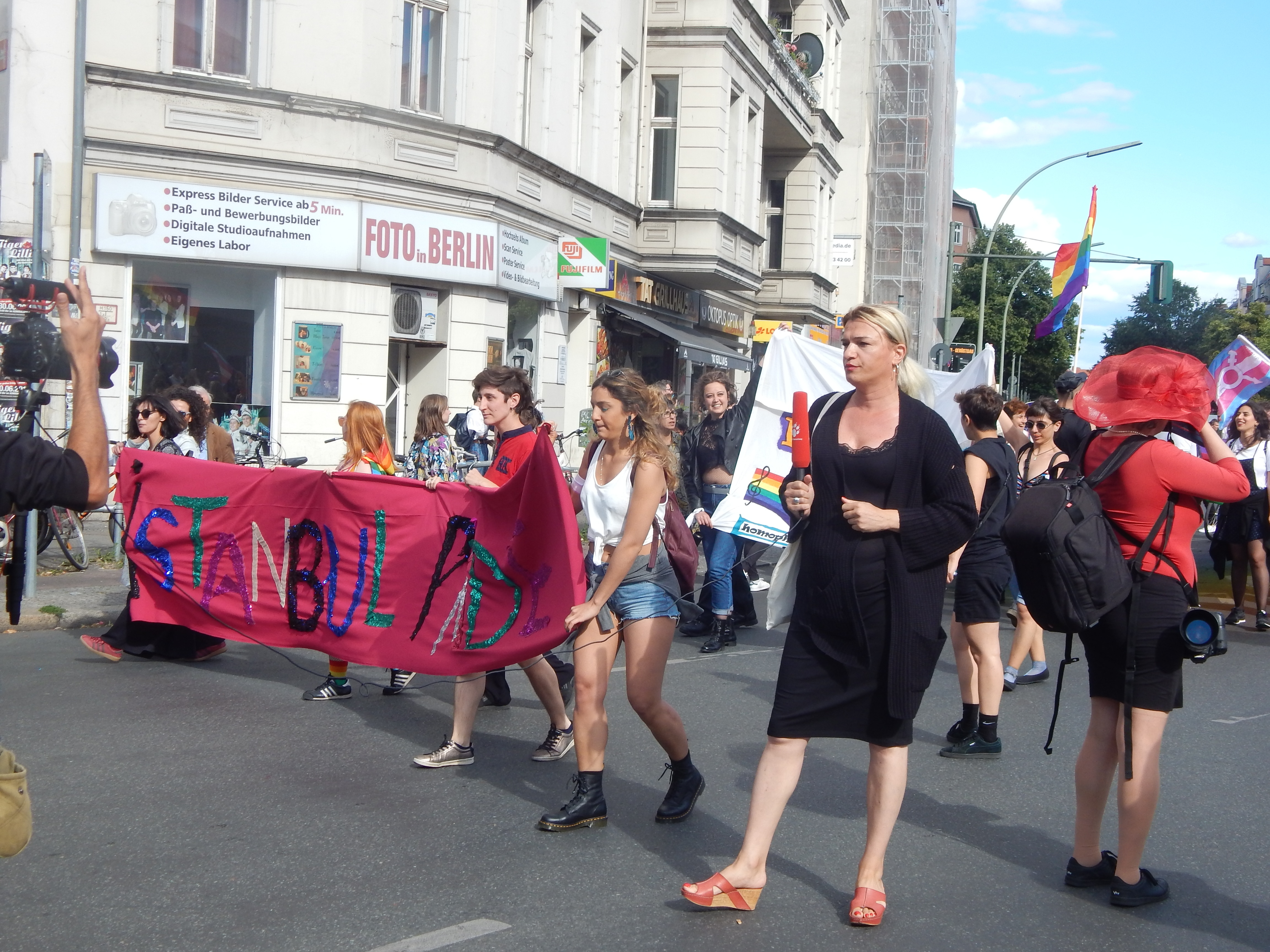
Istanbul Pride Solidarity in Berlin, Germany, 2018

In 2015 police dispersed the Pride parade using tear gas and rubber bullets.

In 2016 and 2017, the Istanbul Governor's Office did not allow the Pride Parade to take place, citing security concerns and public order.

==== Uganda ====
In 2016, Ugandan police broke up a gay pride event in the capital. Homosexual acts are illegal in Uganda.

=== In-group ===
In a special queer issue of The Stranger in 1999, openly gay author, pundit, and journalist Dan Savage questioned the relevance of pride thirty years later, writing that pride was an effective antidote to shame imposed on LGBTQ people, but that pride is now making LGBTQ people dull and slow as a group, as well as being a constant reminder of shame; however, he also states that pride in some simpler forms is still useful to individuals struggling with shame. Savage writes that gay pride can also lead to disillusionment where an LGBTQ individual realizes the reality that sexual orientation does not say much about a person's personality, after being led by the illusion that LGBTQ individuals are part of a co-supportive and inherently good group of people.

The growth and commercialization of Christopher Street Days, coupled with their de-politicization, has led to an alternative CSD in Berlin, the so-called "Kreuzberger CSD" or "Transgenialer" ("Transgenial"/Trans Ingenious") CSD. Political party members are not invited for speeches, nor can parties or companies sponsor floats. After the parade, there is a festival with a stage for political speakers and entertainers. Groups discuss lesbian/transsexual/transgender/gay or queer perspectives on issues such as poverty and unemployment benefits (Hartz IV), gentrification, or "Fortress Europe".

In June 2010, American philosopher and theorist Judith Butler refused the Civil Courage Award (Zivilcouragepreis) of the Christopher Street Day Parade in Berlin, Germany, at the award ceremony, arguing and lamenting in a speech that the parade had become too commercial, and was ignoring the problems of racism and the double discrimination facing homosexual or transsexual migrants. According to Butler, even the organizers themselves promote racism. The general manager of the CSD committee, Robert Kastl, countered Butler's allegations and pointed out that the organizers already awarded a counseling center for lesbians dealing with double discrimination in 2006. Regarding the allegations of commercialism, Kastl further explained that the CSD organizers do not require small groups to pay a participation fee (which starts at €50 and goes up to €1,500). He also distanced himself from all forms of racism and Islamophobia.

Some social movements and associations have criticized modern iterations of pride, viewing it as a depletion of the claims of such demonstrations and the merchandization of the parade. In this respect, they defend, in countries like Spain, the United States or Canada, a Critical Pride celebration to give the events a political meaning again. Gay Shame, a radical movement within the LGBTQ community, opposes the assimilation of LGBTQ people into mainstream, heteronormative society, the commodification of non-heterosexual identity and culture, and in particular the (over) commercialization of pride events.

=== "Straight pride" analogy ===
"Straight pride" and "heterosexual pride" are analogies and slogans that contrast heterosexuality with homosexuality by copying the phrase "gay pride". Originating from the culture wars in the United States, "straight pride" is a form of conservative backlash as there is no straight or heterosexual civil rights movement.

== See also ==
- Black gay pride
- Christopher Street Day
- Council on Religion and the Homosexual
- Lesbian bar
- Gay bar
- EuroPride
- InterPride / IALGPC
- LGBTQ identity
- List of LGBTQ events
- Pride Nights
- Sexuality and gender identity-based cultures
- World's biggest LGBT events by participants
- Suicide among LGBTQ people
