= Shock-No-Par =

Studio album by Octant
- Released: August 10, 1999
- Recorded: December 1998 – March 1999
- Studio: Octant Electronic Music Studio
- Genre: Electronic; rock; pop; krautrock; new wave; lo-fi; electronica
- Length: 27:22
- Label: Up
- Producer: Matthew Steinke

Octant chronology
Shock-No-Par (1999)	Car Alarms and Crickets (2000)

Shock-No-Par is the debut studio album by American musical group Octant, a project led by Seattle-based musician Matt Steinke. Recorded at the group's own studios, the album was then released by Up Records in August 1999. Shock-No-Par exemplifies the group's unusual lineup and set-up, with much of the music being played with Steinke's homemade inventions and the distinctive Octant robot—also created by Steinke—which provides the album's percussion and was credited as a band member, alongside Steinke, who added vocals and keyboards, and Tassany Zimmerman, who added backing vocals and operated the Macintosh used to control the homemade creations.

The album's music is lo-fi in style despite its computerised origins, and explores the group's unusual take on electronica and rock music. The songs are accessible despite their unusual creation, although much of the music is instrumental. The album's CD edition also included two surreal music videos created by Steinke as bonus CD-ROM content. Upon release, the album found favour with music critics, who highlighted the album's unusual sound.

== Background and recording ==
Described as a multimedia project, Octant was formed in Seattle by singer-songwriter and multi-instrumentalist Matt Steinke, who at the time was also the leader of the indie band Mocket. Noted as the act's distinguishing feature, Octant featured a robot, also named Octant, which was built by Steinke from pieces found in laboratories, lofts and pawn shops, after wishing to create a machine which combined the disciplines he had accumulated having studied music and kinetic art at evergreen State College, and later electronics post-graduation. Described as an "automated collection of mallets bolted onto a drum kit," the robot acted as the group's drum machine. Writer Heather Phares wrote that "this willingness to reject conventional ideas about electronics, music, and electronic music defines Octant's unpretentious yet inventive stance."

Octant recorded Shock-No-Par at Electronic Music Studio from December 1998 to March 1999. The Octant robot, among homemade robots, played the percussive and noise parts on the album, while Steinke contributed keyboards and vocals, and third member Tassany Zimmerman added backing vocals and operated the Macintosh which controlled the robots. Among the Octant inventions on the record are the Ad3 Robotic Percussion Unit, Light-Modulated Synthesizer, Random Tone Generator, Photo Theremin and Electrified String Board. Pierre Crutchfield played bass clarinet on the songs "Auto 1", "Ingenous" and "This or What". The album was mixed by Octant and Martin Feveyear at Jupiter Seattle in April 1999.

== Composition ==
"Like yesterday's vision of the future, Octant is a mechanised wonderland of familiar melody and alienating cacophony living peacefully side by side. This drum and keyboard duo features Tassany Zimmerman and Matthew Steinke (of Mocket and Satisfact) along with some mad scientist-type machines that will take us into the next century."

—Ian Danzig, Exclaim!

Although most of Shock-No-Par was created using the homemade robots, the album departs from other robot-centred bands like Servotron and Captured! by Robots due to the record's "odd, cluttered rock songs" which incorporate bleeping, whirring and clattering sounds. Despite the high-minded concept behind the act, the album's music is accessible, aided by the simplistic vocals. Tim Dickinson of Mother Jones Magazine felt that, due to the robots, Octant's take on electronica on the album is accordingly raw and tactile, with "a live feel that belies its computer origins." He noted the record's "unusual marriage of high-tech and lo-fi, of baroque feedback loops and hummable melodies, is difficult to categorise." Writer Glen Sarvady, meanwhile, described the music as a hazy hybrid of krautrock and new wave with dance backbeats, while comparing the album to "deranged carnival music." Most of the album is instrumental, emphasising the robot instruments.

Among the album's songs, "The Move" and "Simplexity" incorporate understated guitars, "boy-girl" vocals, layered synthesizers and the Octant drum robot. "Auto 1" emphasises drumbeats and basslines which sound reversed, while "Ingenous" features wildly distorted tones and an organ line reminiscent of Booker T. The multimedia CD edition also contains two music videos credited to Steinke. These are set to the act's music and are surreal in style, shot in stop-action and featuring disembodied baby doll heads, not unlike the act's visual aspects during live performances. Reviewer Heather Phares described the music on the videos as "techno-scapes". Unlike the CD version, the vinyl edition features two bonus tracks in "3/4 Nostalgia" and "Green Drop .2", the latter of which features a dot matrix printer.

== Release and reception ==
Professional ratings
Review scores
Source	Rating
AllMusic	3/5 stars
PopMatters	8/10

Shock-No-Par was released by Up Records on August 10, 1999. The packaging was designed by Mariko Marrs and Robert Jordan. The album was added to numerous college radio stations, as evidenced by it reaching number 11 on the Radio 200 Adds chart, published in CMJ New Music Monthly. In the same magazine's CMJ Radio 200 chart, compiled by reports of airplay from the magazine's panel of radio stations, the album reached number 45, and also peaked at number 38 on the Core Radio chart.

Heather Phares of AllMusic wrote that the album "combines homespun visual and musical artistry with technological know-how," and praised "Octant's unpretentious yet inventive stance." Similarly, Tim Dickinson of Mother Jones hailed the album as adventurous and "easy to love" despite its unusual sound. Ian Danzig of Exclaim! commented that the act's sonic landscape is populated by "[s]trange gurgles and squelches," highlighting how the "mad scientist-type machines that will take us into the next century." He highlighted how the album's dark pop songs inhabit "a world of sensory overload, but an overload of samples and analogue sounds we know."

In a positive review for PopMatters, Brendan Maher wrote that "Shock-No-Par expertly explores the duo's music-meets-machine as the living accompany the automated in on a bouncy little trip into the mind of a mad scientist." He hailed Octant as an original act on an aesthetic level, but noted that "their music is surprisingly infectious, if not just a little danceable." Glen Sarvady of CMJ New Music Monthly recommended the album to fans of Devo, Kraftwerk and Quasi, and praised the approachable music. Stephen Thompson of The A.V. Club wrote that the record is an often "fairly compelling racket," especially on the "Pong" instrumental, but nonetheless felt the album's concept was more successful than the music, commenting: "If you didn't know Octant's music was made by robots, you'd just think Shock-no-par is an extremely clamorous, relatively minor rock record." Television music supervisor Shawn Petersen named Shock-No-Par as one of his top ten albums of 1999, as listed in the year-end issue of CMJ New Music Monthly.

== Track listing ==
All songs written by Octant

1. "The Move" – 2:34
2. "Auto 1" – 3:28
3. "Igneous" – 3:02
4. "Revert" – 2:57
5. "This and What" – 3:33
6. "Uncomplexed" – 2:05
7. "Simplexity" – 3:03
8. "Pong" – 4:06
9. "65CXV" – 0:34

=== CD-ROM content ===
10. "Mow" (video) – 1:54
11. "65CXV" (video) – 3:59

== Personnel ==
- Tassany Zimmerman – performer, mixing, recording, writing
- Matthew Steinke – performer, films, mixing, writing
- Mariko Mars – art direction, design
- Robert Jordan – art direction, design, artwork (resin sphere)
- Joe Walker – artwork (CD-ROM projector)
- Krista Steinke – photography
- Martin Feveyear – mixing
- Barry Corliss – mastering
