= Kenyon Farrow =

LGBTQ and HIV/AIDS activist

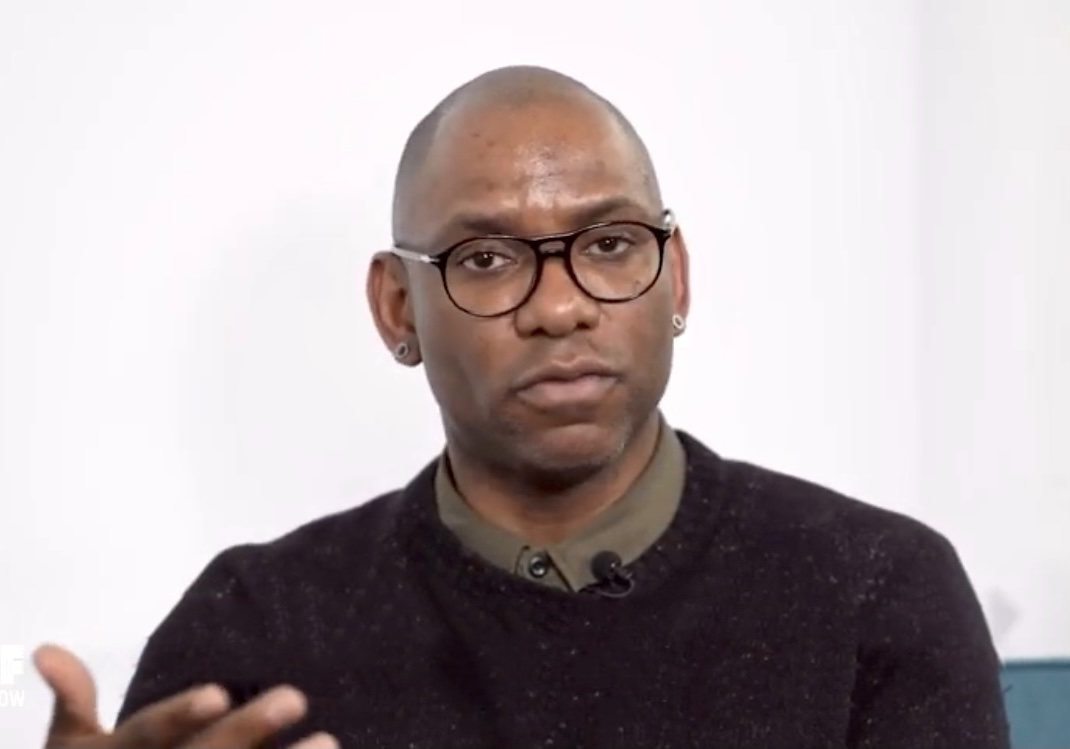
- Farrow in 2020
- Born: November 13, 1974 (age 51); Cleveland, Ohio

Kenyon Farrow (born November 13, 1974) is an American writer, activist, director, and educator focused on progressive racial and economic justice issues related to the LGBTQ community. He served as the executive director of Queers for Economic Justice, policy institute fellow with National LGBTQ Task Force, U.S. & Global Health Policy Director of Treatment Action Group, public education and communications coordinator for the New York State Black Gay Network, senior editor with TheBody.com and TheBodyPro.com, and co-executive director of Partners for Dignity and Rights. In 2021, Farrow joined PrEP4All as managing director of advocacy & organizing.

== Early life and education ==
Descended from generations of African Methodist Episcopal ministers, Farrow began his work as an activist in 1985 at the AIDS Task Force of Greater Cleveland, where he taught and organized sex-education workshops for high school students across his home city. The experience left him intensely interested in social determinants surrounding HIV/AIDS. Witnessing HIV/AIDS discrimination in the church was a motivator for his activism:. "Since HIV/AIDS was automatically linked to homosexuality back then, you'd hear a lot of the fire-and-brimstone-type speeches, about how being gay was an abomination and a sin."

An alumnus of the Hawken School, after graduating from Ohio Wesleyan University with his BA in theatre, he moved to NYC in 1999 to pursue an acting career. Arriving 3 weeks before the death of Amadou Diallo, Farrow found himself profoundly affected by the event as well as by pervasive incidents of violence against black and brown queer youth in the West Village. Following an acclaimed performance as James Baldwin in Mr. Baldwin Goes to Heaven at La MaMa Etc., Farrow shifted his focus from performing to combating these acts of social injustice.

For the next few years he worked against incarceration issues as the southern region coordinator of Critical Resistance and fought against gentrification and the unjust prosecution of queer youth in New York City as a founding member and adult ally of FIERCE! Responding to the dearth of Black voices on queer and racial issues, Farrow began blogging resulting in the publication of a number of acclaimed essays. These essays continue to receive citations in numerous books and academic journals and helped to expand the tone of conversations on race and sexuality in the media. Concurrent with this time, Farrow attended City University of New York's School of Journalism while also working at Clamor Magazine as the magazine's culture editor.

== Career ==
Working with the New York State Black Gay Network as communications and public education coordinator in the mid-2000s, Farrow created anti-homophobia social marketing campaigns to combat misconceptions about HIV/AIDS and discrimination against the LGBTQ community in NYC by collaborating with religious organizations to diminish the impact of homophobia. Farrow joined Queers for Economic Justice as a volunteer shelter project facilitator, later becoming the organization's executive director.

As U.S. & Global Health Policy Director of Treatment Action Group, Farrow used his platform to push coverage of access to healthcare as a social justice and human rights issues, fight against HIV discrimination, mobilize campaigns to halt the rapid spread of HIV and tuberculosis among people of color throughout the south, and push for the expansion of the Affordable Care Act, Medicare, and fair drug pricing to end the national HIV epidemic. During this time he also published a qualitative research project exploring the role of community mobilization in response to HIV, as well as helping to craft a national strategy to end stock-outs of TB drugs. Additionally, as a direct consequence of his lobbying, Governor Andrew Cuomo's NYS End AIDS 2020 agenda was moved to include new funding for the expansion of LGBTQ youth housing options and provide minors with HIV or reproductive care while maintaining their privacy, even if they were on their parents’ insurance. On October 30, 2017, Farrow joined TheBody and TheBodyPro—the world's largest publications devoted to reporting on HIV and AIDS—as a Senior Editor.

He departed the HIV/AIDS focused publications in August 2020 to assume leadership of Partner for Dignity and Rights as co-executive director. In June 2021, he joined PrEP4All―a health equity organization co-founded by Peter Staley―as managing director of advocacy & organizing.

A strong advocate for equal representation, Farrow is noted for his hard line against discrimination. He is also a proponent and user of Pre-exposure prophylaxis (PrEP) as a means of deterring HIV.

== Writing ==
Farrow's writing tackles a range of difficult topics including race, inequality, healthcare, and sexuality and has appeared in major publications including LEVEL, The Atlantic, Color Lines, The American Prospect, Out, POZ, Logo, HIV Plus, Rewire.News, HuffPost, Q Salt Lake Magazine, The Feminist Wire, TheGrio, Washington Blade, The Scholar and Feminist Online, LAMDA Literary, The Black AIDS Institute, and AlterNet.

He also co-edited Letters from Young Activists: Today's Rebels Speak Out and Stand Up!: The Shifting Politics of Racial Uplift. His work is included in the anthologies: We Have Not Been Moved: Resisting Racism and Militarism in 21st Century America, Spirited: Affirming the Soul of Black Lesbian and Gay Identity, Against Equality: Queer Critiques of Same-Sex Marriage, For Colored Boys Who Have Considered Suicide When The Rainbow Is Still Not Enough, and Black Gay Genius: Answering Joseph Beam's Call.

He has appeared as a panelist, lecturer, and keynote speaker at Harvard University, UC Berkeley School of Law, Schomburg Center for Research in Black Culture, Columbia School of Law, Columbia University Center for Study of Social Difference, Columbia University School of Public Health, NYU, The New School Vera List Center for Arts and Politics, CUNY, University of Pennsylvania, Hamilton College, Mount Sinai Hospital Institute for Advanced Medicine, National Conference of Black Political Scientists Annual Meeting, NYPL Stephen A. Schwarzman Building, NAACP, Black Lives Matters Conference, University of Wisconsin–Madison, Murphy Institute, Macalester College, University of Maryland, Hampshire College, Roosevelt House Public Policy Institute at Hunter College, National Association of Black Journalists Conference, Middlebury College, Seattle University, Left Forum, UCLA, and Baker University Center at Ohio University.

He has appeared on PBS Newshour to talk about the commercialization of the Gay Pride Parade specifically in 2019, NPR to discuss President Obama's record on LBGT issues, WNYC to discuss the CDC's decision to under report national HIV transmission rates, in the documentary Sex in an Epidemic tracing the impact of AIDS on the gay community, on GRITtv with Laura Flanders to discuss GetEQUAL's activism, Democracy Now to discuss NY's Marriage Equality Bill, LogoTV's #WORLDAIDSDAY Facebook Live Panel hosting a discussion with Guy Anthony, Kia LaBeija, and Zachary Barnett, BRIC Arts Media with Ashley C. Ford to discuss mental health, race, sexuality, and gender identity, Barnard Center for Research on Women's webseries on marriage, inequality, and violence, 94.1 KPFA to discuss the evolution of the queer mainstream beyond marriage equality, SiriusXM Urbanview Town Hall hosted by Kelly Kinkaid to discuss supporting Black men living with HIV, Making Contact on a panel discussion titled The Color of AIDS, CounterSpin to discuss NC Amendment 1, and in the documentary Unstoppable Feat: The Dances of Ed Mock, an investigation into the life and death of experimental choreographer Ed Mock.

== Accolades ==
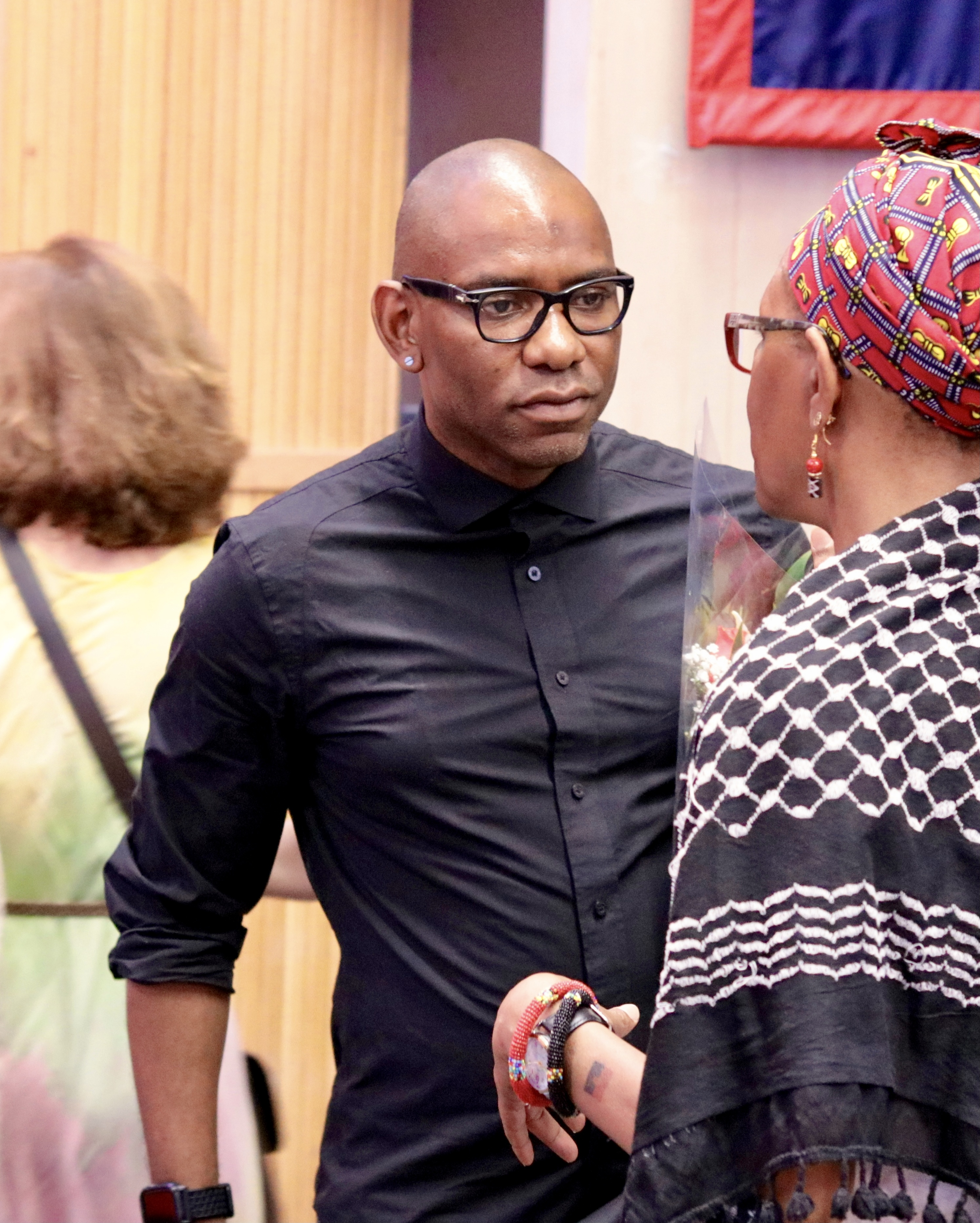
Farrow after his keynote address at the Left Forum in 2019

In 2021, POZ Magazine named Farrow to its POZ 100 list to honor his work as an HIV activist. In 2008, Farrow was listed among Out magazine's Out 100. Two years later, The Advocate named him one of the "40 Under 40" LGBT Leaders in the United States. Black Entertainment Television included him among "Modern Black History Heroes" in 2011, and he was one of The Root's 20 Black LGBT Movers and Shakers for 2012.

Farrow also received the Community Activist award at Chicago Black Pride's Esteem Awards in 2013, was awarded the 2016 Sexual Freedom Award by the Woodhull Institute, was an honoree of Black, Gifted & Whole Foundation's 2017 Gala, and received The Red Door Foundation's 2019 Flame Thrower Award at its 7th Annual Red Gala.
