= Mattilda Bernstein Sycamore =

American activist and author (born 1973)

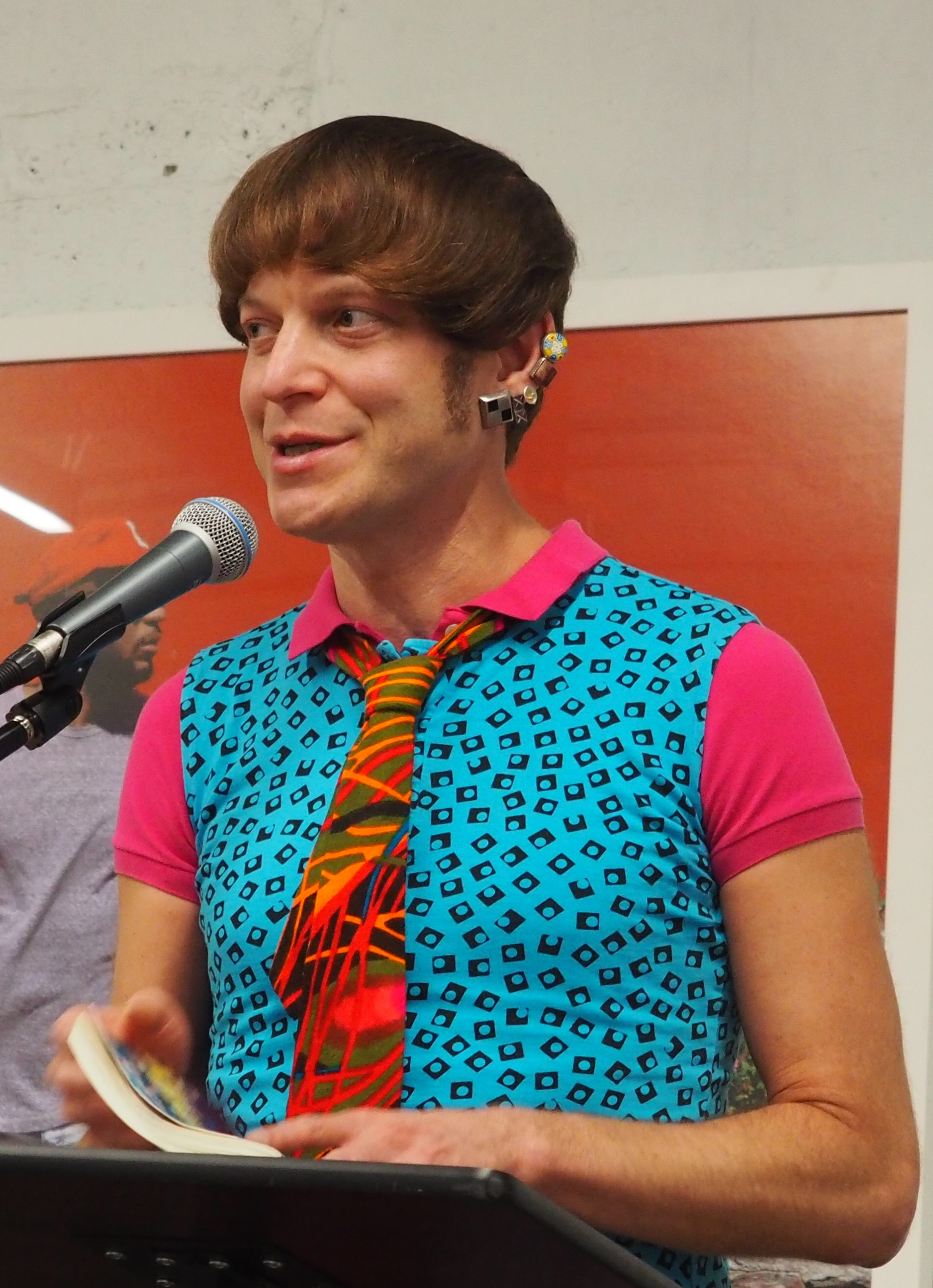
- Born: May 31, 1973 (age 53); Washington, D.C., U.S.
- Writing career
- Genres: Non-fiction, novel, memoir
- Notable awards: Lambda Literary Award

Mattilda Bernstein Sycamore (born May 31, 1973) is an American author and activist. She is the author of three memoirs and four novels, and the editor of six nonfiction anthologies.

== Early life and education ==
Sycamore was born in Washington, D.C. to a Jewish family and was raised in the Potomac Highlands neighborhood of Rockville, Maryland. After spending a year in college at Brown University, in 1992 she moved to San Francisco where she became involved in activism with ACT UP.

== Activism and literary career ==
Sycamore was involved in ACT UP in the early 1990s and Fed Up Queers in the late 1990s. In 1998, she was the host of the first Gay Shame event in New York, appearing with performer Penny Arcade, writer Eileen Myles, cabaret artists Kiki and Herb, and queercore band Three Dollar Bill held in Brooklyn, NY, which was captured in the documentary film entitled Gay Shame 98, by Scott Berry. She was one of the instigators of Gay Shame in San Francisco, which started in 2000 and became "a year-round direct action extravaganza dedicated to exposing all hypocrites". Sycamore was involved in the cultural center Dumba, and is a leading critic of assimilationist trends in gay culture.

Sycamore's first anthology, Tricks and Treats: Sex Workers Write About Their Clients, was published by Haworth Press in 2000. Her first novel, Pulling Taffy, was published by Suspect Thoughts Press in 2003. Her second anthology, Dangerous Families: Queer Writing on Surviving, was published by Haworth Press in 2004. Her third anthology, That's Revolting!: Queer Strategies for Resisting Assimilation, was published by Soft Skull Press that same year. Her fourth anthology, Nobody Passes: Rejecting the Rules of Gender and Conformity, was published by Seal Press in 2006.

Her second novel, So Many Ways to Sleep Badly, was published by City Lights Books in 2008. Her fifth anthology, Why Are Faggots So Afraid of Faggots? Flaming Challenges to Masculinity, Objectification, and the Desire to Conform, was published by AK Press in 2012, and was an American Library Association Stonewall Honor Book as well as a finalist for the Lambda Literary Award for LGBT Anthology.

Sycamore's first memoir, The End of San Francisco, was published by City Lights Books in 2013, and won the 2014 Lambda Literary Award for Transgender Nonfiction. Her third novel, Sketchtasy, was published by Arsenal Pulp Press in 2018. Her second memoir, The Freezer Door, was published by Semiotext(e) in 2020, and received rave reviews in The New York Times and The Washington Post on the publication date. The Freezer Door was named one of the Best LGBTQ Books of 2020 by O, The Oprah Magazine, was a New York Times Editors' Choice, and was a finalist for the 2021 PEN/Jean Stein Book Award, an annual award which recognizes a "book-length work of any genre for its originality, merit, and impact, which has broken new ground by reshaping the boundaries of its form and signaling strong potential for lasting influence."

Sycamore's sixth anthology, Between Certain Death and a Possible Future: Queer Writing on Growing Up with the AIDS Crisis, was published by Arsenal Pulp Press in 2021. Her third memoir, Touching The Art, was published by Soft Skull Press in 2023, and was a finalist for a Pacific Northwest Book Award and a Washington State Book Award. Touching the Art, a hybrid work of memoir, biography, and criticism, focuses on Sycamore’s relationship with her late grandmother, Gladys Goldstein, a Baltimore artist, as well as the themes of gentrification, structural racism, Jewish history, familial homophobia, and artistic legacy.

Sycamore's fourth novel, Terry Dactyl, will be published by Coffee House Press on November 11, 2025. It will be simultaneously released in the UK by Cipher Press. Terry Dactyl received a starred review in Publishers Weekly on September 1, 2025.

As of 2025, she was working on her seventh anthology, ACT UP Beyond New York: Stories and Strategies from a Movement to End the AIDS Crisis, which will be published by Haymarket Books.

Sycamore's work appeared in the Los Angeles Review of Books.

In January 2009, Sycamore initiated a public postering project called Lostmissing, which she describes as:

You know when you have a friend who you think will always be there—no matter what, at least you'll have that friendship, right? Lostmissing is a public art project about the loss of that relationship, a specific relationship for me—right now it's missing.

Sycamore opposed the push among the LGBT movement for same-sex marriage, arguing that it distracts from more pressing issues like the securing of universal health care and housing security for all. Sycamore also opposed the LGBT movement's focus on inclusion in the US military, arguing instead that the movement should be focused on opposing the harmful impacts of the military at home and abroad. In 2010, she appeared on Democracy Now! in the segment "Does Opposing 'Don't Ask, Don't Tell' Bolster US Militarism? A Debate with Lt. Dan Choi and Queer Activist Mattilda Bernstein Sycamore", and later penned op-eds against trans inclusion in the military in Truthout and The Baffler. In 2018, in collaboration with Dean Spade, Sycamore co-organized a Queer Anti-Militarism Townhall: Trans Liberation Not U.S. Invasion at the Seattle Public Library, alongside other queer and trans anti-military voices, including Micha Cárdenas, Soya Jung, Nikkita Oliver and Matt Remle. Sycamore contributed to Against Equality: Queer Critiques of Gay Marriage, and wrote the introduction to Against Equality: Queer Revolution, Not Mere Inclusion, anthologies printed by the Against Equality collective in 2010 and 2014. In 2008, Sycamore was named as a "visionary" as part of Utne Reader magazine's "50 Visionaries Who Are Changing the World".

Sycamore’s papers are archived in the LGBTQIA Center at the San Francisco Public Library.

== Awards and honors ==
- 2005 finalist for the Lambda Literary Award for Anthology Nonfiction, That's Revolting!
- 2006 finalist for the Lambda Literary Award for Erotica with Richard Labonté, Best Gay Erotica 2006
- 2008 finalist for the Lambda Literary Award for Transgender Literature, Nobody Passes
- 2013 American Library Association Stonewall Honor Book and finalist for the Lambda Literary Award for LGBT Anthology, Why Are Faggots So Afraid of Faggots? Flaming Challenges to Masculinity, Objectification, and the Desire to Conform
- 2014 Lambda Literary Award for Transgender Non-Fiction, The End of San Francisco
- 2018 NPR Book Concierge Best Books of 2018, Sketchtasy
- 2018 Artist Trust Fellowship, writer
- 2019 finalist for the Lambda Literary Award for Transgender Fiction, Sketchtasy
- 2020 New York Times Editors' Choice, The Freezer Door
- 2020 O, The Oprah Magazine Best LGBTQ Books of 2020, The Freezer Door
- 2021 finalist for the Lambda Literary Award for Transgender Non-Fiction, The Freezer Door
- 2021 PEN/Jean Stein Book Award Finalist, The Freezer Door
- 2022 finalist for the Lambda Literary Award for LGBTQ Anthology, Between Certain Death and a Possible Future
- 2024 Washington State Book Award Finalist, Touching the Art
- 2025 Pacific Northwest Book Award Finalist, Touching the Art

== Personal life ==
Sycamore is genderqueer and uses she/her pronouns. She has described herself as, "A genderqueer, faggot, and a queen, on the trans continuum, in a gender bending, gender blur kind of place. But the words I relate to the most are probably 'faggot' and 'queen.' 'Queer' would be more of a broader political identity."

Sycamore’s papers are archived in the James C. Hormel LGBTQIA Center at the San Francisco Public Library.

== Bibliography ==
=== Novels ===
- Terry Dactyl Minneapolis: Coffee House Press, 2025. ISBN 978-1-56689-741-9 OCLC 1499213191
- Sketchtasy Vancouver: Arsenal Pulp Press, 2018. ISBN 9781551527291, OCLC 1028209630
- So Many Ways to Sleep Badly San Francisco: City Lights Books, 2008. ISBN 9780872864689, OCLC 768530865
- Pulling Taffy San Francisco: Suspect Thoughts, 2003. ISBN 9780971084636, OCLC 56658648

=== Memoir ===
- Touching the Art New York: Soft Skull Press, 2023. ISBN 9781593767358, OCLC 1370217246
- The Freezer Door South Pasadena: Semiotext(e) 2020. ISBN 9781635901283 OCLC 1140735749
- The End of San Francisco San Francisco: City Lights Books, 2013. ISBN 9780872865723, OCLC 812258393

=== Non-fiction anthologies ===
- Between Certain Death and a Possible Future: Queer Writing on Growing Up with the AIDS Crisis Vancouver: Arsenal Pulp Press, 2021.
- Why Are Faggots So Afraid of Faggots? Flaming Challenges to Masculinity, Objectification, and the Desire to Conform Oakland: AK Press, 2012. ISBN 9781849350884, OCLC 854723328
- Nobody Passes: Rejecting the Rules of Gender and Conformity Emeryville: Seal Press, 2006. ISBN 9781580051842, OCLC 71285289
- That's Revolting!: Queer Strategies for Resisting Assimilation Brooklyn: Soft Skull Press: Distributed by Publishers Group West, 2004. ISBN 9781593761950, OCLC 182552895
- Dangerous Families: Queer Writing on Surviving New York: Haworth Press, 2004.
- Tricks and Treats: Sex Workers Write About Their Clients New York: Haworth Press, 2000. ISBN 9780789007032, OCLC 1013296341

== Filmography ==
- Homotopia (2007)
- All That Sheltering Emptiness (2010), 16mm, 7 mins
