= Mission Local =

American news website

- Type: Local news website
- Format: Online
- Owner: Independent
- Founder: Lydia Chavez
- Publisher: Lydia Chavez
- Language: English and Spanish
- Headquarters: 2489 Mission St. #22; San Francisco, California, 94110; U.S.
- Website: missionlocal.org

Mission Local is a bilingual local independent online news site that also publishes a semiannual printed paper that covers the Mission District of San Francisco.

== History ==
In 2008, UC Berkeley's Graduate School of Journalism received funding from the Ford Foundation to launch several hyperlocal news websites, including Mission Local, Oakland North and Richmond Confidential, focusing on “underserved” Bay Area neighborhoods. With Berkeley professor Lydia Chavez serving as the founder and executive editor, Mission Local provided students with the opportunity to gain “hands-on reporting experience” by covering the latest happenings across the San Francisco's Mission District. In 2009, Mission Local began publishing news in Spanish in addition to English.

In February 2014, Edward Wasserman, the Dean of Berkeley's Graduate School of Journalism, announced that Mission Local will re-launch as an independent, for-profit standalone media operation. In his memo, he clarified that the decision to withdraw funding, faculty support and student participation was prompted by Mission Local’s operating costs. He also said that the news website “distracted students from the core curriculum of the program.”

Mission Local became a fiscally sponsored nonprofit in 2018, and its own nonprofit in 2022.

== Staff and features ==
In 2024, Christopher Haugh, Doug Ng and Genisha Saverimuthu were unanimously elected to Mission Local’s board for three-year terms starting January 1, 2025. The announcement also acknowledged the departure of Mimi Chakarova, Bulgarian-American photographer and filmmaker, who was a member of Mission Local’s inaugural board. Joe Eskenazi, the managing editor of Mission Local was re designated to an ex-officio position on the board.

On January 28, 2015, a 108-year-old Mission Street building which housed the offices of Mission Local caught fire. The fire resulted in the loss of one life, and left 58 homeless. Mission Local continued to cover the fire extensively despite the “unsalvageable” damage to the office space.

As of 2014, the website distributes 10,000 free, printed editions of Mission Local as a newspaper twice a year.

== Awards ==
In June 2009, Mission Local won a Webby Award for being the best student news site in the country.

Mission Local staff won awards from the Society of Professional Journalists Northern California chapter in 2010, 2015, 2018, 2019, 2020, 2022, 2023, 2024 and 2025.

Mission local also won California Journalism Awards in 2024.

== See also ==
- Institute for Nonprofit News (member)
