= Wrath Month =

Neologism and meme about LGBTQ+ activism occurring after Pride Month

Wrath Month is a neologism that generally refers to July, the month after Pride Month. It originated as an Internet meme in 2018.

== History ==
"Wrath Month" originated as a Twitter meme in 2018. The term is a play on the seven deadly sins, pride and wrath being two of them. Other Twitter users joked about highlighting months for the remaining deadly sins, including sloth and envy. The term came to be used in other contexts, highlighting ongoing issues for the LGBT community during and outside of Pride Month.

== Usage and analysis ==
The term has been described, in part, as a response to the idea that Pride Month has become increasingly docile, where Wrath Month provides an opportunity to call attention to issues affecting LGBT acceptance and equality. John Paul Brammer, writing for Them.us, introduces his piece on Wrath Month with a criticism of Pride Month's ties to rainbow capitalism. Patrick Lenton with Junkee writes that Pride Month is no longer a message of "rebellion and resistance", instead trending towards "acceptance and love". He also criticizes police forces and politicians who pander to LGBT people – only during Pride Month – for support.

Other sources depict it as a response to what Out describes as Pride Month's "sense of comradery" dissipating after the month ends.

Wrath Month has also been used as a replacement for Pride Month, with a Colorado Springs Independent opinion piece drawing from the emotions of the Stonewall riots that Pride Month is intended to commemorate. The piece specifically cited solidarity with the ongoing George Floyd protests as one reason the LGBT community should feel angry.

In July 2022, Them.us began a series titled Wrath Month, describing the month as an "unofficial celebration of LGBTQ+ anger".

== See also ==
- Gay Shame – Radical queer collective and movement
