= Queer anarchism =

Anarchist school of thought

Queer anarchism, or anarcha-queer, is an anarchist school of thought that advocates anarchism and social revolution as a means of queer liberation and abolition of systems of oppression such as homophobia, lesbophobia, transmisogyny, anti-transmasculinity, biphobia, transphobia, aphobia, heteronormativity, patriarchy, and the gender binary.

== History ==
The early gay liberation movement shared many theoretical foundations and philosophies with anarchist movements in the mid twentieth century. Chants such as "2-4-6-8, smash the church, smash the state!" were popular around the time of the Stonewall riots, setting the tone for a queer rights movement grounded in anarchist thought. The two campaigns both focus on rejecting normative thinking and the state in favor of personal liberty and pleasure.

Anarchism and queer theory both reject paternalistic state structures that depend on capitalism and the nuclear family. Instead, both favor forms of self-determination and the reordering of society. An example of anarchism and queerness intersecting can be found in those who engage in non-monogamous relationships, these are inherently anarchical, as they are rejecting traditional power structures that shape the nuclear family. This concept has been coined Relationship Anarchism.

Queer anarchists have been active in protesting and activism, using direct action against what is seen as homonormative consumerism and pink capitalism. Queer anarchists have set up squats and autonomous zones as well as urban communities for the queer and LGBT community. Rural communities often rely on social media to grow anarchist movements and networks, due to these communities being geographically isolated from urban centers. Social networking sites facilitate knowledge transmission that provides alternative ideals to people in rural populations that were previously only available to urban dwellers.

Many queer anarchists embrace the notion of radical individualism, influenced by individualist and egoist philosophers like Max Stirner. Organizations like ACT-Up, a punk anti-racist, anti-fascist organization, supported and were composed of queer anarchists and have supported queer radicals and direct action. Later during the WTO protests, queer anarchists played a vital role in organizing the mass protests. The protests would lead to the explosion of the anti-globalization movement.

=== "Be Gay, Do Crime" ===
"Be gay, do crime" is a slogan popular in contemporary Pride parades, LGBTQ+-related protests, and graffiti. In 2018, it was popularised on Twitter by a meme created by Io Ascarium of the ABO Comix collective, which sells comics made by other abled LGBTQ+ prisoners. Ascarium describes the phrase as coming "from the communal grab-bag of anti-assimilationist queer slogans. Like 'ACAB' or 'Stonewall was a Riot' it was pulled from the chaotic ether, originated nowhere and belongs to nobody," though Google Trends suggests interest has existed since at least 2011. The "memeification" of the "be gay do crime" slogan is an example of increased accessibility into anarchist schools of thought.

The slogan "Be gay, do crime" is an anti-capitalistic and anti-authoritarian statement, implying that crime and incivility may be necessary to earn equal rights given the criminalization of homosexuality around the world and that the Stonewall uprising was a riot. Within the anarchist space, the Mary Nardini Gang reflected on their manifesto Toward the Queerest Insurrection with the book Be Gay Do Crime, where they affirm "the reality and the continuity of a culture and a history of experiencing outlawness, illegality, and lack of citizenship". Mark Bieschke, a curator at the GLBT History Museum, claimed that the slogan is meant to stand against the "polished, corporate narrative of Pride".

American cartooning publication The Nib compiled Be Gay, Do Comics, an anthology of short comics "featuring queer history, memoir, and satire", launched on the crowdfunding platform Kickstarter in November 2019, and later published for mainstream distribution in September 2020. In the book's foreword, Nib co-editor Mattie Lubchansky explained the title as an homage to Ascarium's meme, interpreting it as a reminder that "Queerness has always been transgressive, regardless of its legal status."

== Gallery ==
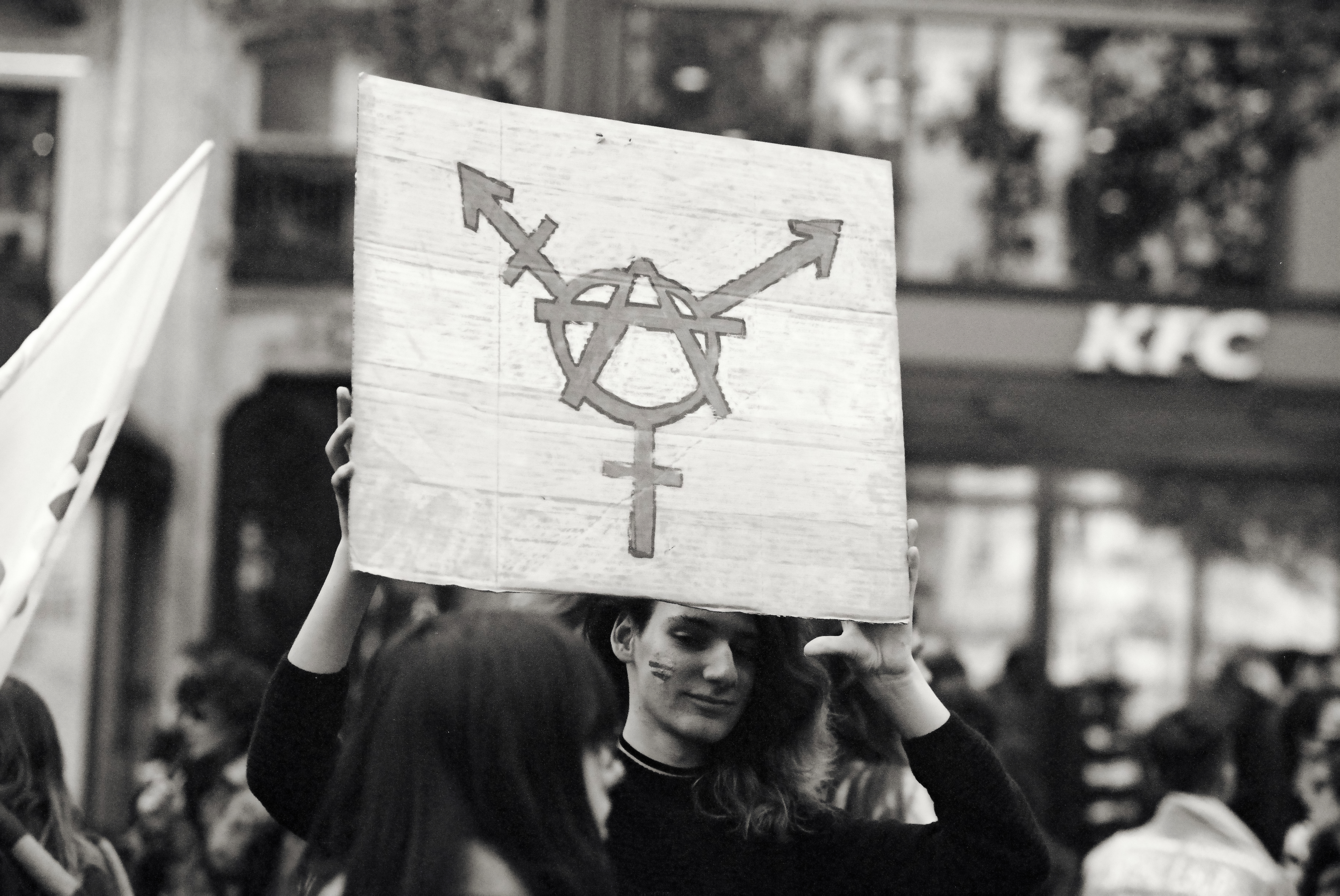
Anarchist and queer symbolism

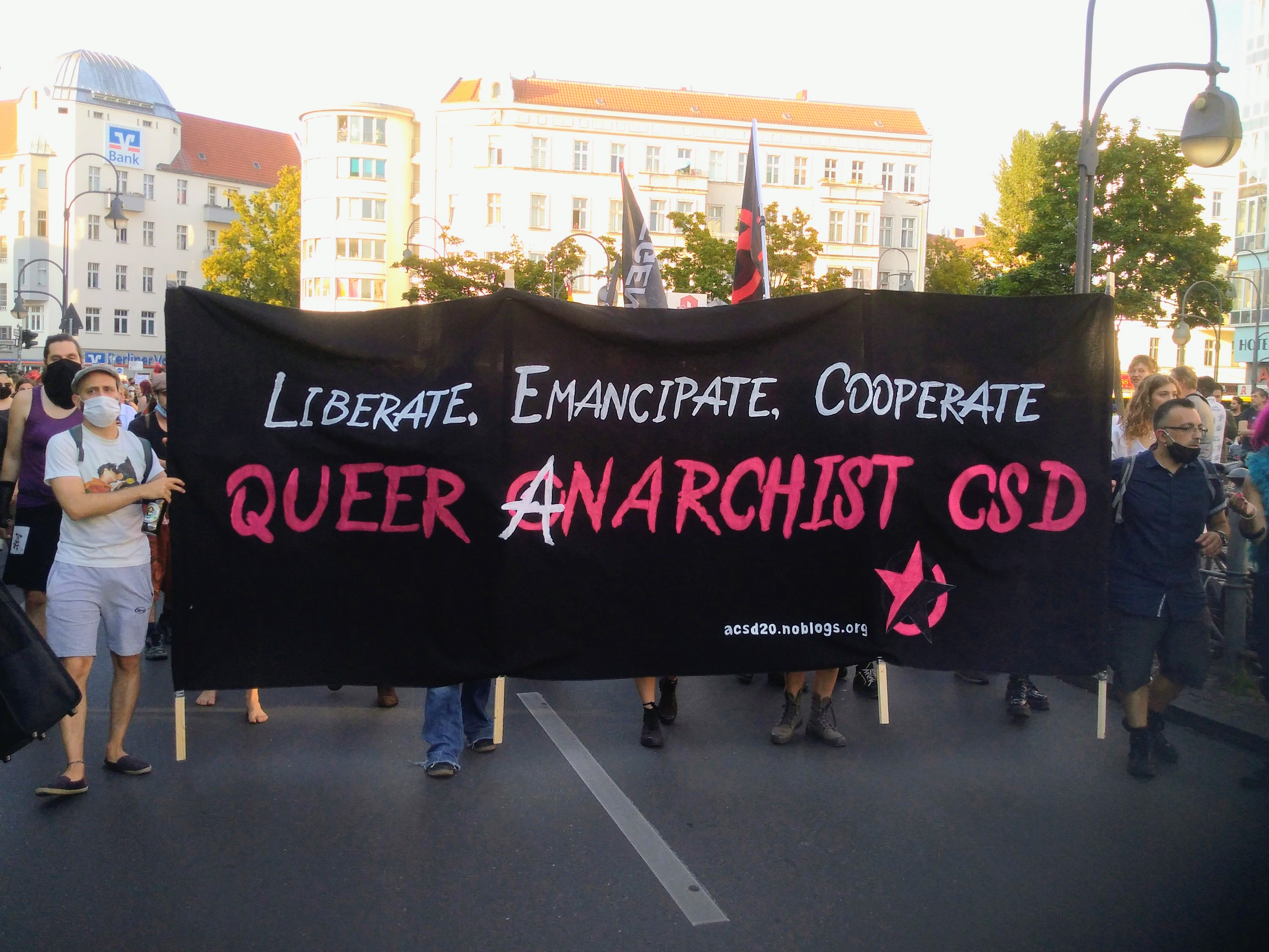
Queer anarchist banner at Christopher Street Day parade, Berlin, 2020

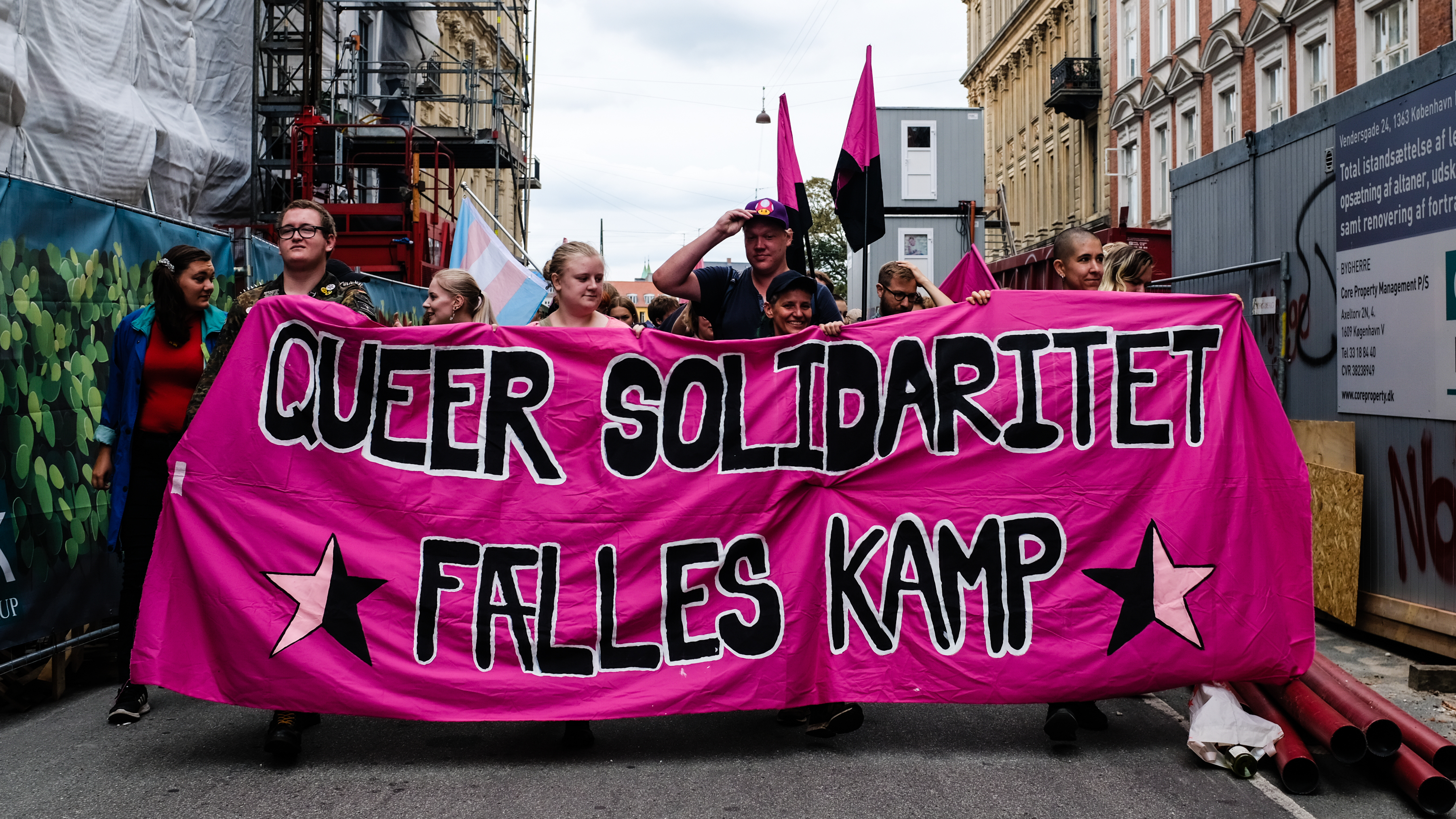
Queer anarchists in Denmark with banner reading "Queer solidarity"

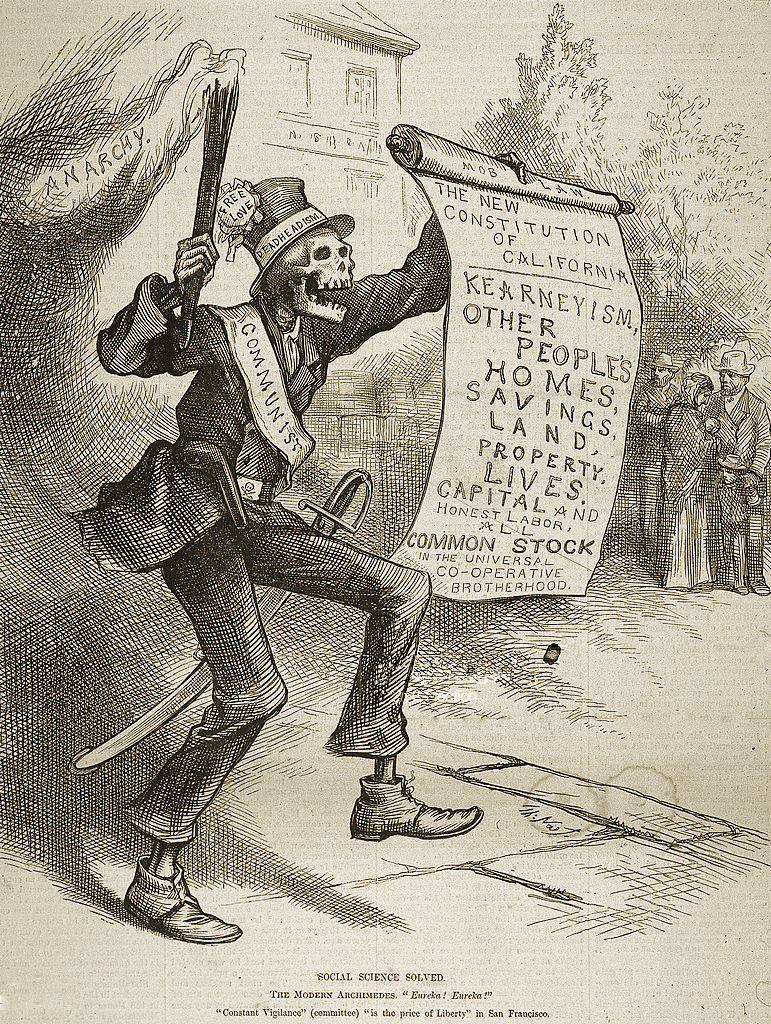
1880 cartoon by Thomas Nast that was used in Ascarium's meme

== See also ==
- Anarchism and issues related to love and sex
- Communism and LGBT rights
- DUMBA – a New York collective living space with Anarcha-queer tendencies
- Gay Shame – a movement self-described as a radical alternative to gay mainstreaming
- Rainbow capitalism
- ACT UP
- Queeruption – a queercore festival where anarchists are prominent
- Relationship anarchy
- Socialism and LGBT rights

== Bibliography ==
- Daring, C. B.; Rogue, J.; Shannon, Deric; Volcano, Abbey, eds. (2012). Queering Anarchism: Addressing and Undressing Power and Desire. AK Press. ISBN 978-1-84935-120-1. LCCN 2012914347.
- Heckerson, Jamie; Clemison, Richard, eds. (2011). Anarchism & Sexuality: Ethics, Relationships and Power. Routledge. ISBN 978-0-203-82844-1. LCCN 2010039814 – via Google Books.
- Jeppesen, Sandra; Nazar, Holly (2012). "Genders and Sexualities in Anarchist Movements". In Kinna, Ruth (ed.). The Continuum Companion to Anarchism. Continuum International Publishing Group. pp. 162–191. ISBN 978-1-4411-4270-2.
- Jeppesen, Sandra; Nazar, Holly (2017). "Anarchism and Sexuality". In Jun, Nathan (ed.). Brill's Companion to Anarchism and Philosophy. Leiden: Brill. pp. 216–252. doi:10.1163/9789004356894_010. ISBN 978-90-04-35689-4.
- Nicholas, Lucy (2018). "Gender and Sexuality". In Adams, Matthew S.; Levy, Carl (eds.). The Palgrave Handbook of Anarchism. London: Palgrave Macmillan. pp. 603–621. doi:10.1007/978-3-319-75620-2_34. ISBN 978-3319756196. S2CID 242073896.
- Shepard, Benjamin (August 2010). "Bridging the divide between queer theory sage and anarchism". Sexualities. 13 (4): 511–527. doi:10.1177/1363460710370656. ISSN 1363-4607. S2CID 146813842. Archived from the original on September 22, 2021.
