= Octant (band) =

- Origin: Olympia, WA, United States
- Genres: Art rock, experimental rock, electronic rock, indietronica, krautrock
- Years active: 1996–2001, 2010–present
- Label: Up Records
- Members: Matt Steinke
- Past members: Tassany Zimmerman
- Website: www.myspace.com/octantmusic

Octant was an experimental noise rock duo formed in 1996 in Washington State. They recorded two full-length albums, released on Up Records. The duo was led by multiinstrumentalist and instrument designer Matt Steinke, with Tassany Zimmerman primarily on synthesizer. Their live show included an electromechanical automated drum machine designed and built by Steinke.

In 2010, Steinke announced a Kickstarter campaign for a new Octant record. Zimmerman was not involved. The self-titled album was released on January 15, 2011.

== Discography ==
- Shock-No-Par, album from Up Records; (1999)
- Car Alarms and Crickets, album from Up Records; (2000)
- Octant, self-released album (2011).
- ABSENT, Self-released EP (2022)
