= Queeruption =

Annual queercore festival

Queeruption (a compound/portmanteau/blend word of queer and eruption) is an annual international queercore festival and gathering started in 1998 where alternative, radical, and disenfranchised queers can exchange information, network, organize, inspire and get inspired, self-represent, and challenge mainstream society with do-it-yourself ideas and ethics. Shows featuring queer punk bands, performance artists, and other entertainment are put on at night, while workshops and demonstrations take place during the day. Queeruption generally takes place in a different city in a different country every year. It has contributed to anarcha-queer movements. The groups that organize each event and even within the same city may have disagreements about how aspects should represent politics including queer safe spaces.

== History ==
The first Queeruption was held in London in 1998 by a network of radical queer anarchists. According to the 2004 Queeruption Zine, the first Queeruption started with several queer activists in London squatting in a building one weekend with the goal of a "politically inspiring and educational gathering." This squatting and gathering of queer anarchists was the result of gentrification in a neighborhood in South London. This same zine states that the first Queeruption was in the Spring of 1998. An article from Bi Community News in 1998 contests this account, asserting that the first event occurred on a weekend in September. According to this same article from Bi Community News, the first Queeruption in London involved many different performances and presentations from various personalities and acts such as the performance artist The Divine David, bisexual writer Charlotte Cooper, queercore band Mouthfull, artist Sexton Ming, and playwright Marissa Carr.

Although framed as a festival, Queeruption's main purpose is community activism and outreach within queer communities around the world. Squatting has been an important part of past Queeruptions, as the first one in London was founded upon squatting in a gentrified area of South London. The justification behind squatting is the reclaiming of "public spaces" in order to use them as political, educational, and artistic spaces by queer individuals. Inherently, Queeruption participants see this squatting and gathering as an act of resistance against capitalism.

Information for Queeruption has typically been spread through zines. In more recent years, the information has been spread online, such as the now defunct Queeruption website or Instagram for the 2017 Budapest festival. The motto of Queeruption is "Queer mutiny, not consumer unity," and generally these events stand for a display of queer expression that the groups argue diverts from the conventional Gay Pride events. According to the 2004 Queeruption Zine, the gatherings in the past have included "vegan meals, political discussions, direct action, skills, workshops, bands, spoken word, dressup and cabaret, dance parties, film screenings, radical sex, spontaneous haircuts, and more."

== List of gatherings ==
- Queeruption 1 (1998) London
- Queeruption 2 ( Oct 7-11, 1999) New York City
- Queeruption 3 (2001) San Francisco
- Queeruption 4 (2002) London
- Queeruption 5 (2003) Berlin
- Queeruption 6 (2004) Amsterdam
- Queeruption 7 (2005) Sydney
- Queeruption 8 (2005) Barcelona
- Queeruption 9 (2006) Tel Aviv
- Queeruption 10 (2007) Vancouver
- Queeruption 11 (2010) Manchester
- Queeruption 12 (2017) Budapest
- Queeruption 13 (2026) Brandon, Manitoba

== See also ==
- Ladyfest
- Queer
- Queer Mutiny
- Rainbow capitalism
