= Pansy Division discography =

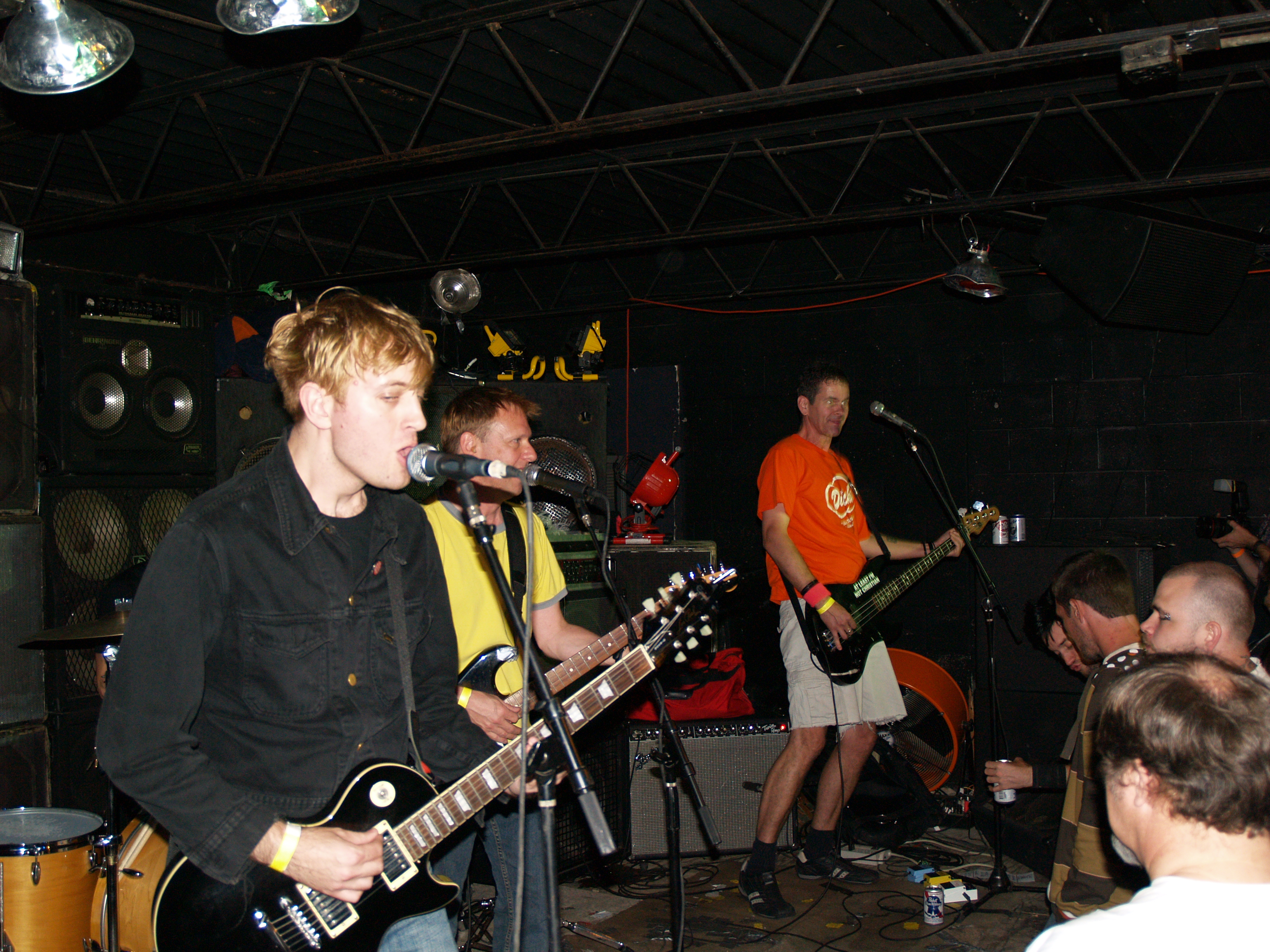
- Studio albums: 7
- Compilation albums: 5
- Singles: 13
- Music videos: 7

The discography of Pansy Division, a San Francisco, California-based queercore band, consists of seven studio albums, five compilations and thirteen 7" singles, among other releases.

== Studio albums ==
Year	Title	Label
1993	Undressed	Lookout! Records
1994	Deflowered	Lookout! Records
1996	Wish I'd Taken Pictures	Lookout! Records / Mint Records
1998	Absurd Pop Song Romance	Lookout! Records
2003	Total Entertainment!	Alternative Tentacles
2009	That's So Gay	Alternative Tentacles
2016	Quite Contrary	Alternative Tentacles

== Compilation albums ==
Year	Title	Label
1995	Pile Up	Lookout! Records
1996	More Lovin' from Our Oven	Lookout! Records
2006	The Essential Pansy Division	Alternative Tentacles
2010	Lost Gems & Rare Tracks	Self-released on iTunes and Bandcamp
2010	Pansy Division Live 1992-2003	Self-released on iTunes and Bandcamp

== 7" singles and EPs ==
Year	Title	Label	Tracks
1992	Fem in a Black Leather Jacket	Lookout! Records	1. "Fem in a Black Leather Jacket"; 2. "Homo Christmas"; 3. "Smells Like Queer Spirit"
1993	Bill & Ted's Homosexual Adventure	Outpunk Records	1. "Bill & Ted's Homosexual Adventure"; 2. "Big Bottom"
1993	Touch My Joe Camel	Lookout! Records	1. "Touch My Joe Camel"; 2. "Homosapien"; 3. "Trash"
1994	Nine Inch Males EP	Lookout! Records	1. "Fuck Buddy"; 2. "Cry for a Shadow"; 3. "The Biggest Lie"
1994	Jack U Off	Empty Records	1. "Jack U Off"; 2. "Strip U Down"
1994	Jackson	K Records	1. "Jackson" (w/ Calvin Johnson); 2. "I Really Wanted You"
1995	James Bondage	Lookout! Records	1. "James Bondage"; 2."Flower"; 3. "Real Men"; 4. "Denny (Naked)"
1996	Valentine's Day	Lookout! Records	1. "Valentine's Day"; 2. "He Could Be The One"; 3. "Pretty Boy (What's Your Name?)"
1996	For Those About to Suck Cock	Lookout! Records	1. "Headbanger"; 2. "Sweet Pain"; 3. "Breaking the Law"
1997	Manada	Mint Records	1. "Manada"; 2. "One Night Stand"; 3. "Hockey Hair"; 4. "Manada (Version Quebecois)"
1997	Queer to the Core	Lookout! Records	1. "Political Asshole"; 2. "Two Way Ass"; 3. "Expiration Date"
2009	Average Men	Alternative Tentacles	1. "Average Men" (w/ Jello Biafra); 2. "Coming Clean"
2016	Blame the Bible	Alternative Tentacles	1. "Blame the Bible"; 2. "Neighbors of the Beast"

=== Split 7" ===
Year	Title	Label	Tracks
1994	Stop Homophobia (split with Fagbash, Happy Flowers and Black Angel's Death Song)	Turkey Baster Records	1. "Cowboys Are Frequently, Secretly Fond Of Each Other"
1995	Gay Pride (You Don't Know What Your Missing) (split with Chumbawamba, Mambo Taxi, Wat Tyler and Spdfgh)	Rugger Bugger Records	1. "Bill & Ted's Homosexual Adventure"
1998	Tummy Shaking (Split with Bis, Sourtooth and Ozma)	Scutter Records	1. "Vicious Beauty (live)"
2004	Dirty Queers Don't Come Cheap (split with Skinjobs)	Mint Records	1. "Your Loss"; 2. "I Know Your Type"

== Compilation appearances ==
- "I Can't Sleep" on Outpunk Dance Party (Outpunk Records, 1992)
- "Homo Christmas" on Punk Rock Christmas (Rhino Records, 1995)
- "Ring of Joy" on A Slice Of Lemon (Lookout! Records, 1996)
- "Jackson" on Project: Echo (K Records, 1996)
- "Bunnies" on Stars Kill Rock (Kill Rock Stars, 1996)
- "Pillow Talk" on Team Mint (Mint Records, 1996)
- "The Summer You Let Your Hair Grow Out" on Heide Sez Lookout! (Lookout! Records, 1996)
- "Can't Make Love" (with Tré Cool) on Generations, Vol 1: A Punk Look at Human Rights (Ark 21 Records, 1997)
- "Loose" on We Will Fall: The Iggy Pop Tribute (Royalty Records, 1997)
- "Political Asshole" on The Last Great Thing You Did (Lookout! Records, 1997)
- "He Could Be The One" on Fer Shure: A Tribute to the Valley Girl Soundtrack (Itchy Korean Records, 1997)
- "Expiration Date" on Milkshake – A CD to Benefit the Harvey Milk Institute, (timmi-kat ReCoRDS, 1998)
- "Musclehead" on Forward 'Til Death: A Sampler Compilation (Lookout! Records, 1999)
- "Hockey Hair" on Puck Rock, Vol. 2 (Sudden Death Records, 2000)
- "The Summer You Let Your Hair Grow Out (Live)" on Songs for Summer (Oglio Records, 2000)
- "Used to Turn Me On (Demo)" on Lookout! Freakout (Lookout Records!, 2000)
- "Luv Luv Luv" on Bi the People: A Compilation of Bisexual Artists & Friends (Violent Yodel Records, 2003)
- "Luv Luv Luv" on Queer Stock Queer Soup (Queer Stock, 2003)
- "I Can Make You A Man" on The Rocky Horror Punk Rock Show (Springman Records, 2004)
- "Musclehead" on Plea for Peace, Vol. 2' (Asian Man Records, 2007)
- "You'll See Them Again" on Kat Vox: Celebrating 20 Years of timmi-kat ReCoRDS (timmi-kat ReCoRDS, 2011)

=== Soundtrack appearances ===
- "Deep Water" in Angus, directed by Patrick Read Johnson (1995)
- Queercore: A Punk-U-Mentary, directed by Scott Treleaven (1996)
- Skin & Bone, directed by Everett Lewis (1996)
- "Sweet Insecurity" and "Luv Luv Luv", Luster, directed by Everett Lewis (2002)
- "First Betrayal" in Hellbent, directed by Paul Etheredge-Ouzts (2005)
- Pansy Division: Life In A Gay Rock Band (2008)

== Videography ==
=== Video releases ===
Year	Details
2009	Pansy Division: Life in a Gay Rock Band: Released: 2009; Label: Alternative Tentacles; Formats: DVD
2009	Live Insubordination Fest '09: Released: 2009; Label: Insubordination Records; Formats: DVD

=== Music videos ===
Year	Title
1993	"Hippy Dude"
1993	"Homo Christmas"
1993	"Touch My Joe Camel"
1996	"I Really Wanted You"
1997	"Manada"
1998	"Bad Boyfriend"
1998	"Vicious Beauty"
