= The Essential Pansy Division =

Compilation album by Pansy Division
- Released: January 24, 2006
- Recorded: 1992–2003
- Genre: Queercore, pop-punk, power pop
- Length: 1:18:23
- Label: Alternative Tentacles

Pansy Division chronology
Total Entertainment! (2003)	The Essential Pansy Division (2006)	That's So Gay (2009)

Professional ratings
Review scores
Source	Rating
AllMusic	link
Pitchfork	(7.8/10) link

The Essential Pansy Division is a compilation album by American queercore band Pansy Division, released on January 24, 2006 by Alternative Tentacles. Its name is an allusion to Legacy Recordings' The Essential series.

Personally selected by the band themselves, The Essential Pansy Division is a collection of Pansy Division's most notable and popular songs, spanning from their 1992 debut single Fem in a Black Leather Jacket to their 2003 studio album Total Entertainment!. The CD album is accompanied by a DVD featuring live footage and the band's music videos, as well as extensive liner notes written by singer-songwriter Jon Ginoli, detailing each track.

== Reception ==
The Essential Pansy Division received unanimously positive acclaim from the music press. AllMusic, rating it with a score of 4.5 out of 5 stars, wrote that the compilation "[showcases] exactly what they're good at -- playing tight, catchy pop-punk songs with clever lyrics that ooze with upfront and hilarious sexual references", summarizing it as a perfect "starter kit for those just discovering these witty and energetic punks". PopMatters wrote "Pansy Division at their best have always combined elements of '60s pop and '70s punk into an irresistible cocktail that was outrageous, touching, funny and real in roughly equally measures. Despite its many omissions, all of these elements are displayed richly on The Essential Pansy Division, ultimately rating the album with 9 out of 10 stars. Pitchfork gave the album a score of 7.8 out of 10, praising the band's material as "fun, three-chord punk at its best" and "fine examples of how fun pop-punk can be".

== Track listing ==
=== CD ===
No.	Title	Original album	Length
1.	"Who Treats You Right" (Ginoli/Freeman)	Total Entertainment! (2003)	2:21
2.	"Fem in a Black Leather Jacket" (Ginoli)	Fem in a Black Leather Jacket 7" (1992)	2:03
3.	"Anthem" (Ginoli)	Undressed (1993)	2:24
4.	"I'm Gonna Be a Slut" (Freeman/Ginoli)	More Lovin' From Our Oven (1997)	2:09
5.	"Horny in the Morning" (Ginoli/Freeman)	Wish I'd Taken Pictures (1996)	1:35
6.	"Dick of Death" (Freeman)	Wish I'd Taken Pictures	2:40
7.	"Bad Boyfriend" (Ginoli/Freeman)	Absurd Pop Song Romance (1998)	2:29
8.	"The Summer You Let Your Hair Grow Out" (Ginoli/Freeman)	Wish I'd Taken Pictures	2:11
9.	"Spiral" (Freeman)	Total Entertainment!	3:08
10.	"Denny (Naked)" (Ginoli/Healey)	James Bondage 7" (1995)	2:31
11.	"Boyfriend Wanted" (Ginoli)	Undressed	2:51
12.	"Luv Luv Luv" (Ginoli)	Absurd Pop Song Romance	2:35
13.	"James Bondage" (Freeman)	Deflowered (1995)	2:49
14.	"Vanilla" (Ginoli/Freeman)	Wish I'd Taken Pictures	2:08
15.	"Alpine Skiing" (Ginoli)	Total Entertainment!	3:11
16.	"Bunnies" (Ginoli)	Undressed	2:00
17.	"Groovy Underwear" (Ginoli)	Deflowered	3:40
18.	"No Protection" (Freeman/Ginoli)	Total Entertainment!	3:52
19.	"Sweet Insecurity" (Ginoli/Freeman/Goodwin/Illades)	Absurd Pop Song Romance	4:03
20.	"Deep Water" (Ginoli)	Deflowered	2:07
21.	"You're Gonna Need Your Friends" (Freeman)	Absurd Pop Song Romance	3:16
22.	"The Best Revenge" (Ginoli/Freeman/Goodwin/Illades)	Absurd Pop Song Romance	4:53
23.	"Negative Queen (Stripped Bare)" (Ginoli)	More Lovin' From Our Oven	2:15
24.	"Headbanger" (Ginoli/Freeman)	For Those About to Suck Cock EP (1997)	2:53
25.	"Political Asshole" (Ginoli)	Queer to the Core EP (1997)	1:14
26.	"I Can't Sleep" (Ginoli)	Outpunk Dance Party compilation (1994)	1:32
27.	"I Really Wanted You" (Ginoli)	Wish I'd Taken Pictures	2:12
28.	"The Cocksucker Club" (Ginoli)	Undressed	2:18
29.	"Homo Christmas" (Ginoli)	Fem in a Black Leather Jacket 7"	2:31
30.	"He Whipped My Ass In Tennis (Then I Fucked His Ass In Bed)" (Ginoli)	Total Entertainment!	2:12
31.	"Two Way Ass" (Freeman/Ginoli)	Queer to the Core EP	0:16
Total length:			1:18:23

=== DVD ===
Music video

1. "Hippy Dude" – 3:23
2. "Homo Christmas" – 2:29
3. "Touch My Joe Camel" – 2:48
4. "I Really Wanted You" – 2:47
5. "Manada" – 2:10
6. "Bad Boyfriend" – 2:38
7. "Vicious Beauty" – 5:03

Live in Chicago – November 18, 1994

1. "Fem In A Black Leather Jacket (Live)" – 1:58
2. "The Cocksucker Club (Live)" – 2:12
3. "Fuck Buddy (Live)" – 2:14
4. "Versatile (Live)" – 2:43

Live on Italian television – November 26, 1998

1. "Bad Boyfriend (Live)" – 2:43
2. "interview" – 3:29
3. "You're Gonna Need Your Friends (Live)" – 3:00
4. "The Best Revenge (Live)" – 4:58
