= Chris Freeman (musician) =

American musician (born 1961)

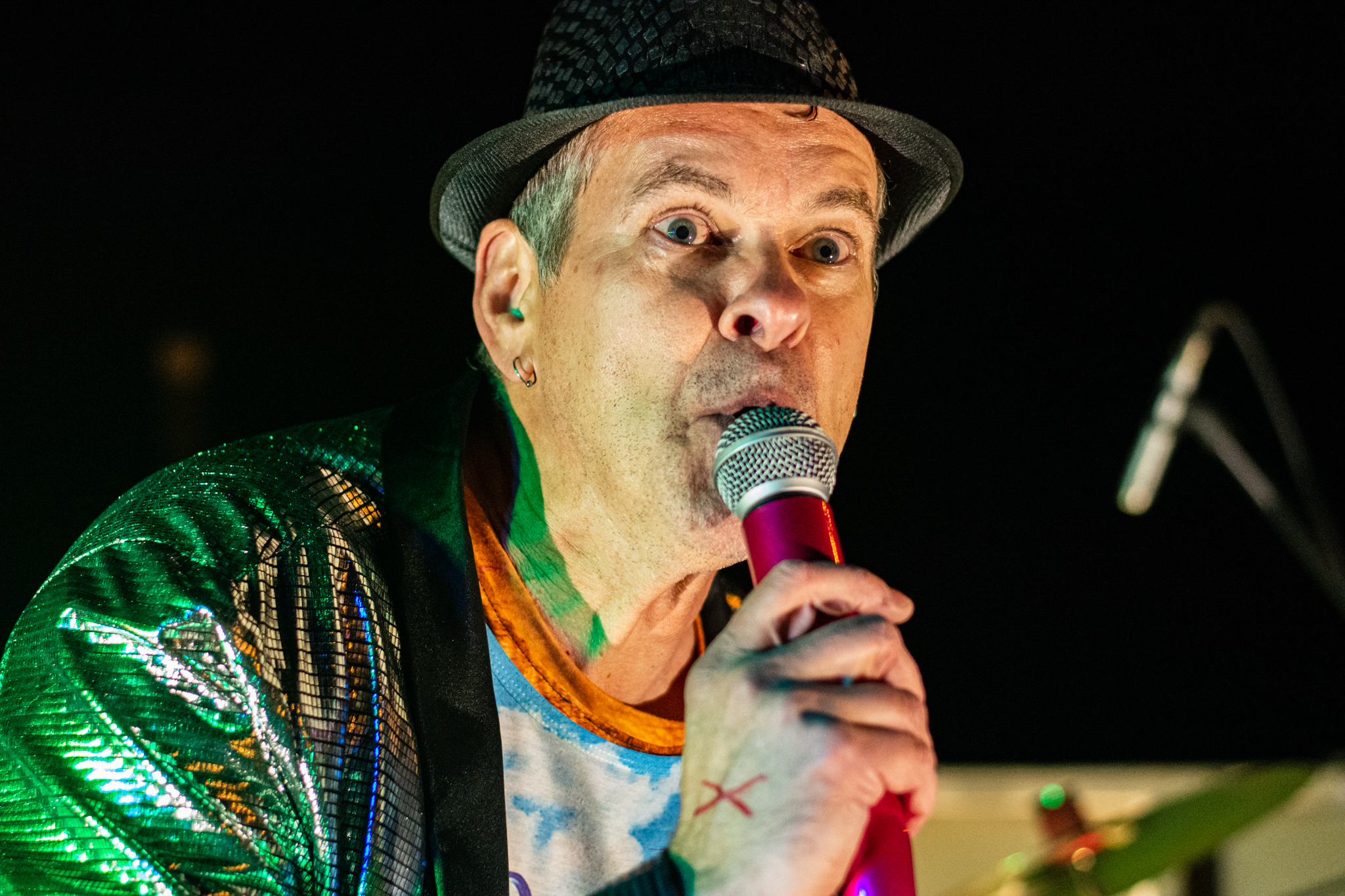
- Chris Freeman performing with GayC/DC in May 2021.
- Born: Christopher Mark Freeman; August 8, 1961 (age 65); Seattle, Washington, U.S.
- Occupations: Bassist, vocalist
- Known for: Pansy Division; GayC/DC

Chris Freeman (born Christopher Mark Freeman, August 8, 1961 in Seattle, Washington) is an American bassist and vocalist, best known as a member of the band Pansy Division.

== Early life ==
Freeman was born in Seattle and attended Weatherwax High School in Aberdeen, Washington. At school, he got beaten up routinely and tried to hide his homosexuality. At age nineteen, Freeman was going to marry a girl that he played in a band with, before breaking it off and admitting he was gay.

== Career ==
=== Pansy Division ===
Freeman eventually left Washington and moved to San Francisco. In 1991 he met Jon Ginoli through an ad Ginoli placed in the San Francisco Weekly looking for "gay musicians into the Ramones, Buzzcocks and early Beatles". With Freeman playing bass, and Ginoli guitar, Pansy Division went through a series of drummers before settling on Luis Illades, who has been in the band since 1996.

They became known as one of the founders of the queercore genre of punk rock, and received mainstream recognition by being Green Day's opening act for their first arena tour in 1994.

=== GayC/DC ===
After Freeman moved to Los Angeles in 2001, he later joined a band of gay musicians who started a Go-Go's tribute band called The Gay-Gays, which lasted for 10 years. Freeman started another band with guitarist Karl Rumpf and drummer Brian Welch in 2013 called GayC/DC, an all-gay tribute to Australian hard rock band AC/DC.

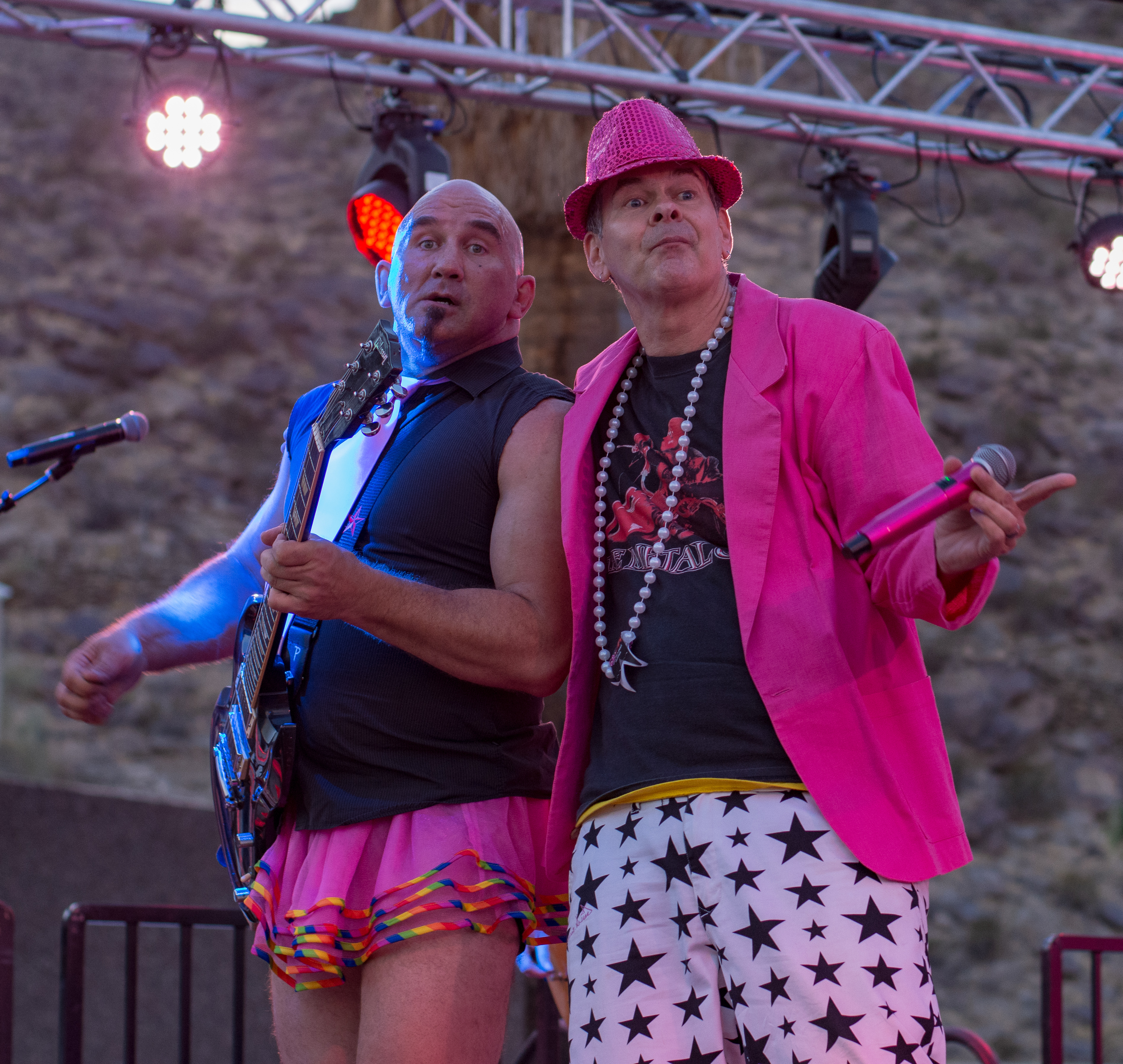
Steve McKnight (left) and Freeman (right) perform with GayC/DC at Palm Springs Pride in Palm Springs, California in 2018.

The band met their guitarist Steve McKnight after Freeman found an ad he posted on the gay personals site DaddyHunt. They also added former Best Revenge bassist Glen Pavan.

McKnight, Pavan and Freeman also formed a side project called Mary and performed at Palm Springs Pride in Palm Springs, California on November 3, 2019.

== Discography ==
=== Albums ===
- Attachments on Art & Economix Records (1985)
- Undressed on Lookout! Records (1993)
- Deflowered on Lookout! Records (1994)
- Wish I'd Taken Pictures on Mint Records (1996)
- Absurd Pop Song Romance on Lookout! Records (1998)
- Total Entertainment! on Alternative Tentacles (2003)
- That's So Gay on Alternative Tentacles (2009)

=== Compilation albums ===
- Pile Up on Lookout! Records (1995)
- More Lovin' From Our Oven on Lookout! Records (1997)
- The Essential Pansy Division on Alternative Tentacles (2006)
- Lost Gems & Rare Tracks exclusively on iTunes (2010)

=== 7" singles ===
- "How Do You Feel About Me" (Art & Economix Records, 1984)
- "Do You Hear What I Hear / Masques" (Art & Economix Records, 1985)
- "Fem In A Black Leather Jacket" b/w "Homo Christmas" & "Smells Like Queer Spirit" (Lookout! Records, 1992)
- "Bill & Ted's Homosexual Adventure" b/w "Big Bottom" (Outpunk, 1993)
- "Touch My Joe Camel" b/w "Homosapien" & "Trash" (Lookout! Records, 1993) (cover art by Anonymous Boy)
- "Nine Inch Males" EP: "Fuck Buddy", "Cry for a Shadow" & "The Biggest Lie" (Lookout! Records, 1994)
- "Jack U Off" b/w "Strip You Down" (Empty Records, 1994)
- "Jackson" b/w "I Really Wanted You" (K Records, 1994) (Collaboration with Calvin Johnson)
- "Cowboys Are Frequently, Secretly Fond Of Each Other", on 'Stop Homophobia' compilation with Fagbash, Happy Flowers and Black Angel's Death Song (Turkey Baster Records, 1994)
- "James Bondage" b/w "Flower", "Real Men" & "Denny (Naked)" (Lookout! Records, 1995)
- "Gay Pride" split EP, with Chumbawamba and Spdfgh, (Rugger Bugger Records, 1995)
- "Valentine's Day" b/w "He Could Be The One" & "Pretty Boy (What's Your Name?)" (Lookout! Records, 1996)
- "For Those About to Suck Cock" EP: "Headbanger", "Sweet Pain" & "Breaking the Law" (Lookout! Records, 1996)
- "Manada" b/w "One Night Stand", "Hockey Hair", "Manada (Version Quebecois)" (Mint Records, 1997)
- "Queer to the Core" EP: "Political Asshole", "Two Way Ass" & "Expiration Date" (Lookout! Records, 1997)
- "Scutter Fanzine presents 'Tummy Shaking'" split EP, with Bis, Sourtooth & Ozma (Scutter Records, 1998)
- "Dirty Queers Don't Come Cheap" split EP w/ Skinjobs: "Your Loss" & "I Know Your Type" (Mint Records, 2004)
- "Average Man" b/w "Coming Clean" (Green Day cover) (Alternative Tentacles, 2009)

=== Compilation appearances ===
- "I Can't Sleep" on Outpunk Dance Party (Outpunk Records, 1992)
- "Homo Christmas" on Punk Rock Christmas (Rhino Records, 1995)
- "Ring of Joy" on A Slice Of Lemon (Lookout! Records, 1996)
- "Jackson" on Project: Echo (K Records, 1996)
- "Bunnies" on Stars Kill Rock (Kill Rock Stars, 1996)
- "Pillow Talk" on Team Mint (Mint Records, 1996)
- "The Summer You Let Your Hair Grow Out" on Heide Sez Lookout! (Lookout! Records, 1996)
- "Can't Make Love" (with Tré Cool) on Generations, Vol 1: A Punk Look at Human Rights (Ark 21 Records, 1997)
- "Loose" on We Will Fall: The Iggy Pop Tribute (Royalty Records, 1997)
- "Political Asshole" on The Last Great Thing You Did (Lookout! Records, 1997)
- "He Could Be The One" on Fer Shure: A Tribute to the Valley Girl Soundtrack (Itchy Korean Records, 1997)
- "Expiration Date" on Milkshake – A CD to Benefit the Harvey Milk Institute, (timmi-kat ReCoRDS, 1998)
- "Musclehead" on Forward 'Til Death: A Sampler Compilation (Lookout! Records, 1999)
- "Hockey Hair" on Puck Rock, Vol. 2 (Sudden Death Records, 2000)
- "The Summer You Let Your Hair Grow Out (Live)" on Songs for Summer (Oglio Records, 2000)
- "Used to Turn Me On (Demo)" on Lookout! Freakout (Lookout Records!, 2000)
- "Luv Luv Luv" on Bi the People: A Compilation of Bisexual Artists & Friends (Violent Yodel Records, 2003)
- "Luv Luv Luv" on Queer Stock Queer Soup (Queer Stock, 2003)
- "I Can Make You A Man" on The Rocky Horror Punk Rock Show (Springman Records, 2004)
- "Musclehead" on Plea for Peace, Vol. 2' (Asian Man Records, 2007)
- "You'll See Them Again" on Kat Vox:A CD To Celebrate 20 Years of timmi-kat ReCoRDS (timmi-kat ReCoRDS, 2011)

=== Soundtrack appearances ===
- "Deep Water" in Angus, directed by Patrick Read Johnson (1995)
- Queercore: A Punk-U-Mentary, directed by Scott Treleaven (1996)
- Skin & Bone, directed by Everett Lewis (1996)
- "Sweet Insecurity" and "Luv Luv Luv", Luster, directed by Everett Lewis (2002)
- "First Betrayal" in Hellbent, directed by Paul Etheredge-Ouzts (2005)
- Pansy Division: Life In A Gay Rock Band (2008)

== Other work ==
In 2000 Freeman moved to Los Angeles to attend film school. One of his classmates was Michael Carmona, who would go on to direct the 2008 documentary film Pansy Division: Life In a Gay Rock Band, which Freeman edited and co-produced. He was also in the 1997 documentary Queercore: A Punk-U-Mentary and appeared as an actor in the 2002 film Luster.

Freeman has also written for various magazines and publications including Frontiers.
