= Lost Gems & Rare Tracks =

Compilation album by Pansy Division
- Released: June 21, 2010
- Recorded: 1993–2009
- Genre: Queercore, punk rock
- Length: 37 minutes

Pansy Division chronology
That's So Gay (2009)	Lost Gems & Rare Tracks (2010)

Lost Gems & Rare Tracks is a compilation of singles, unreleased tracks, demos and other rare songs by queercore band Pansy Division. It was released exclusively on iTunes in 2010. The album follows the band's two other rarities albums 1995's Pile Up and 1997's More Lovin' from Our Oven.

== Track listing ==
1. "Homosapien" (7" version) (Pete Shelley)
2. "I Really Wanted You" (7" version) (Jon Ginoli)
3. "Son of a Preacher Man" (John Hurley, Ronnie Wilkins)
4. "Can't Make Love" (Wall of Voodoo)
5. "Loose" (The Stooges)
6. "Musclehead" (Ginoli)
7. "Used To Turn Me On" (demo version) (Chris Freeman, Ginoli)
8. "Vicious Beauty" (live) (Ginoli, Pansy Division)
9. "I Can Make You a Man" (Richard O'Brien)
10. "You Make Me Hot" (The Donnas)
11. "Your Loss" (Ginoli)
12. "I Know Your Type" (Freeman)
13. "Too Many Hoops" (alternate guitar solo) (Ginoli, Freeman)
14. "Coming Clean" (Billie Joe Armstrong)

== Track origins ==
- "Homosapien" B-side to "Touch My Joe Camel" single (1993)
- "I Really Wanted You" B-side to "Jackson" single (1994)
- "Can't Make Love" from Generations, Vol 1: A Punk Look at Human Rights (1997)
- "Loose" from We Will Fall: The Iggy Pop Tribute (1997)
- "Musclehead" from Forward 'Til Death: A Sampler Compilation (1999)
- "Used to Turn Me On" (Demo) "from Lookout! Freakout (2000)
- "I Can Make You A Man" from The Rocky Horror Punk Rock Show (2004)
- "Coming Clean" B-side to "Average Man" single (2009)

== Personnel ==
- Jon Ginoli- guitar, vocals
- Chris Freeman- bass, vocals
- Patrick Goodwin- guitar tracks 5–13
- Luis Illades- drums on tracks 5–14
- David Ward- drums on track 1
- Dustin Donaldson- drums on tracks 2–3
- Tre Cool- drums on track 4
- Joel Reader- guitar on track 14
