= Smells Like Teen Spirit =

1991 single by Nirvana

Single by Nirvana

from the album Nevermind
- B-side: "Drain You" (UK only); "Even in His Youth"; "Aneurysm"
- Released: September 10, 1991
- Recorded: May 1991
- Studio: Sound City (Van Nuys, California)
- Genre: Grunge; alternative rock
- Length: 5:01 (album version); 4:38 (single version)
- Label: DGC
- Composers: Kurt Cobain; Dave Grohl; Krist Novoselic
- Lyricist: Kurt Cobain
- Producers: Butch Vig; Nirvana

Nirvana singles chronology
"Here She Comes Now / Venus in Furs" (1991)	"Smells Like Teen Spirit" (1991)	"On a Plain" (1991)

Alternative cover
- US CD single

Music video
- "Smells Like Teen Spirit" on YouTube

"Smells Like Teen Spirit" is a song by the American rock band Nirvana. It is the opening track and lead single from Nirvana's second album, Nevermind (1991), released on DGC Records. Having sold over 13 million copies worldwide, it is one of the best-selling songs of all time. The success propelled Nevermind to the top of several albums charts and is often marked as the point when grunge entered the mainstream. It was Nirvana's biggest hit, charting high on music industry charts around the world in 1991 and 1992, and was number one on the charts in Belgium, France, New Zealand and Spain.

The guitarist and singer, Kurt Cobain, described "Smells Like Teen Spirit" as an attempt to write "the ultimate pop song", inspired by the soft-and-loud dynamics of the Pixies. The title derives from a phrase written by his friend Kathleen Hanna, the singer of the riot grrrl band Bikini Kill: "Kurt smells like Teen Spirit." Hanna was referring to the deodorant Teen Spirit, but Cobain misinterpreted it as a revolutionary slogan.

The music video depicts a high school pep rally which ends in chaos, inspired by Jonathan Kaplan's 1979 film Over the Edge and the Ramones' film Rock 'n' Roll High School. It won two MTV Video Music Awards, and was in heavy rotation on MTV during the 1990s. Amy Finnerty, formerly of MTV's programming department, said the video "changed the entire look of MTV" by giving the channel "a whole new generation to sell to". In 2000, the Guinness World Records named "Smells Like Teen Spirit" the most played video on MTV Europe.

"Smells Like Teen Spirit" was met with acclaim and described as an "anthem for apathetic kids" of Generation X. It was included in the Rock and Roll Hall of Fame's list of "The Songs That Shaped Rock and Roll". In 2001, the Recording Industry Association of America ranked it number 80 on their "Songs of the Century" list. In 2002, NME named it the second-greatest single, and in 2013 Kerrang! ranked it the greatest. In 2021, Rolling Stone ranked "Smells Like Teen Spirit" fifth on its list of "the 500 Greatest Songs of All Time". In 2017, it was inducted into the Grammy Hall of Fame.

== Writing and recording ==
"Smells Like Teen Spirit" was one of several songs written following Nirvana's first recording sessions with producer Butch Vig in 1990. Lead singer and guitarist Kurt Cobain began writing it a few weeks before recording their second album, Nevermind, in 1991. He said it was an attempt to write a song in the style of the Pixies, a band he admired:

I was trying to write the ultimate pop song. I was basically trying to rip off the Pixies. I have to admit it. When I heard the Pixies for the first time, I connected with that band so heavily that I should have been in that band—or at least a Pixies cover band. We used their sense of dynamics, being soft and quiet and then loud and hard.

When Cobain presented the song to his bandmates, it comprised just the main guitar riff and the chorus vocal melody. Cobain said the riff was "clichéd", similar to a riff by Boston or the Richard Berry song "Louie Louie". Bassist Krist Novoselic dismissed it as "ridiculous"; in response, Cobain made the band play it for an hour and a half. Eventually, Novoselic began playing it more slowly, inspiring drummer Dave Grohl to create the drum beat, which drew from disco artists such as the Gap Band. As a result, it is the only song on Nevermind to credit all three band members as writers.

The title derives from a phrase coined by Cobain's friend Kathleen Hanna, singer of the riot grrrl band Bikini Kill: "Kurt smells like Teen Spirit." Hanna and Tobi Vail, Cobain's then-girlfriend, had been at a grocery store earlier in the day, discovered Teen Spirit deodorant, thought the name was funny and joked that various things "smelled like Teen Spirit". Later on, Hanna wrote the phrase in sharpie on Cobain's wall. Cobain said that he was unaware of the deodorant until months after the single was released, and had interpreted it as a revolutionary slogan, as they had been discussing anarchism and punk rock.

Prior to the album recording, the band sent Vig demos for songs including "Teen Spirit". While the sound was distorted due to the band playing at a high volume, Vig felt it had promise. Vig and the band recorded "Smells Like Teen Spirit" at Sound City Studios in the Los Angeles, California neighborhood of Van Nuys in May 1991. Vig suggested changes to the arrangement, including moving a guitar ad lib to the chorus and shortening the chorus. The band recorded the basic track in three takes, and used the second take. Vig corrected some timing errors created by Cobain switching between his guitar effects pedals. Cobain recorded only three vocal takes; according to Vig, "I was lucky to ever get Kurt to do four takes."

== Music ==
"Smells Like Teen Spirit"
Sample of "Smells Like Teen Spirit" from Nirvana's 1991 album Nevermind. The sample illustrates the change in dynamics.

"Smells Like Teen Spirit" is a grunge and alternative rock song. It was recorded in the original key of F minor and follows a F^{5}-B♭^{5}-A♭^{5}-D♭^{5} chord progression, with the main guitar riff constructed from four power chords played in a syncopated sixteenth note strum by Cobain. The guitar chords were double tracked to create a "more powerful" sound. The chords occasionally lapse into suspended chord voicings as a result of Cobain playing the bottom four strings of the guitar for the thickness of sound. The riff resembles that of Boston's 1976 hit "More Than a Feeling", although it is not identical; the band would sometimes play a fragment of that song as an introduction. During the verses, Cobain used a Small Clone effect pedal to add a chorus effect.

"Smells Like Teen Spirit" uses a "somewhat conventional formal structure" consisting of four-, eight-, and twelve-bar sections, including an eight-bar verse, an eight-bar pre-chorus, a twelve-bar chorus and a post-chorus. Musicologist Graeme Downes, who led the band the Verlaines, says that "Smells Like Teen Spirit" illustrates developing variation. Elements of the structure are marked with shifts in volume and dynamics, moving from quiet to loud several times. This structure of "quiet verses with wobbly, chorused guitar, followed by big, loud hardcore-inspired choruses" became an alternative rock template.

During the verses, the band maintains the same chord progression as the chorus. Cobain plays a two-note guitar line over Novoselic's root-note eighth note bassline, which outlines the chord progression. In the pre-chorus, Cobain begins to play the same two notes on every beat of the measure and repeats the word "Hello". In the post-chorus, Cobain simultaneously sings the word "Yay" and performs a unison bend on his guitar. After the second chorus, Cobain plays a 16-bar guitar solo restating his vocal melody from the verse and pre-chorus. During the outro, Cobain sings "A denial" repeatedly; his voice becomes strained from the force of yelling.

== Lyrics and interpretation ==
The lyrics to "Smells Like Teen Spirit" were often difficult for listeners to decipher, both due to their nonsensicality and because of Cobain's slurred, guttural singing voice. This problem was compounded by the fact that the Nevermind album liner notes did not include any lyrics for the songs aside from selected lyrical fragments. This incomprehensibility contributed to the early resistance from radio stations towards adding the song to their playlists; one Geffen promoter recalled that people from rock radio told her, "We can't play this. I can't understand what the guy is saying." MTV went as far as to prepare a version of the video that included the lyrics running across the bottom of the screen, which they aired when the video was added to their heavy rotation schedule. The lyrics for the album—and some from earlier or alternate versions of the songs—were later released with the liner notes of the "Lithium" single in 1992. American rock critic Dave Marsh noted comments by disc jockeys of the time that the song was "the 'Louie Louie' of the nineties" and wrote, "Like 'Louie', only more so, 'Teen Spirit' reveals its secrets reluctantly and then often incoherently." Marsh, trying to decipher the lyrics, felt after reading the correct lyrics from the song's sheet music that "what I imagined was quite a bit better (at least, more gratifying) than what Nirvana actually sang", and added, "Worst of all, I'm not sure that I know more about [the meaning of] 'Smells Like Teen Spirit' now than before I plunked down for the official version of the facts."

The book Teen Spirit: The Stories Behind Every Nirvana Song describes "Teen Spirit" as "a typically murky Cobain exploration of meaning and meaninglessness". Azerrad plays upon the juxtaposition of Cobain's contradictory lyrics (such as "It's fun to lose and to pretend") and states "the point that emerges isn't just the conflict of two opposing ideas, but the confusion and anger that the conflict produces in the narrator—he's angry that he's confused". Azerrad's conclusion is that the song is "alternately a sarcastic reaction to the idea of actually having a revolution, yet it also embraces the idea". Additionally, the "famously obscure couplet" in the chorus—"A mulatto, an albino / A mosquito, my libido"—is, according to Azerrad, "nothing more than two pairs of opposites, a funny way of saying the narrator is very horny". In Heavier Than Heaven, Charles R. Cross' biography of Cobain, Cross argues that the song is a reference to Cobain's relationship with ex-girlfriend Tobi Vail. Cross cites the line "She's over-bored and self-assured" and states the song "could not have been about anyone else". Cross backs up his argument with lyrics which were present in earlier drafts, such as "Who will be the King & Queen of the outcasted [sic] teens". (Note: Earlier drafts of the lyrics to "Smells Like Teen Spirit" have been reprinted in Kurt Cobain's Journals (2002).)

"Teen Spirit" is widely interpreted as a teen revolution anthem, an interpretation reinforced by the music video. In an interview conducted the day Nevermind was released, Cobain stated the song was about his friends, explaining, "We still feel as if we're teenagers because we don't follow the guidelines of what's expected of us to be adults ... It also has kind of a teen revolutionary theme." In Michael Azerrad's biography Come as You Are: The Story of Nirvana, Cobain said he felt a duty "to describe what I felt about my surroundings and my generation and people my age". He also said, "The entire song is made up of contradictory ideas ... It's just making fun of the thought of having a revolution. But it's a nice thought." As Cobain did more interviews, he changed his explanation of the song and rarely gave specifics about the meaning. Grohl stated he does not believe the song has any message, and said, "Just seeing Kurt write the lyrics to a song five minutes before he first sings them, you just kind of find it a little bit hard to believe that the song has a lot to say about something. You need syllables to fill up this space or you need something that rhymes."

== Release and reception ==
Professional ratings
Review scores
Source	Rating
AllMusic	4/5 stars

"Smells Like Teen Spirit" was released to radio on August 27, 1991. On September 10, it was released as the lead single from Nevermind, Nirvana's major label debut on DGC Records. The song did not initially chart, and it sold well only in regions of the United States with an established Nirvana fanbase.

The single was intended to be a base-building alternative rock cut from the album, and was not expected to be a hit; the follow-up "Come as You Are" was planned as the single that could cross over to mainstream radio formats. However, campus and modern rock radio stations placed "Smells Like Teen Spirit" on heavy rotation. Danny Goldberg of Nirvana's management firm Gold Mountain said: "None of us heard it as a crossover song, but the public heard it and it was instantaneous ... They heard it on alternative radio, and then they rushed out like lemmings to buy it."

The video received its world premiere on MTV's late-night alternative rock program 120 Minutes on September 29, and proved so popular that the channel began to air it during its regular daytime rotation. MTV added the video to its "Buzz Bin" selection in October, where it stayed until mid-December. By the end of the year, the song, music video, and the Nevermind album had become hits. "Smells Like Teen Spirit" and Nevermind became a rare cross-format phenomenon, reaching all the major rock radio formats including modern rock, hard rock, album rock, and college radio.

"Smells Like Teen Spirit" was also a critical and commercial success. It topped the 1991 Village Voice "Pazz & Jop" and Melody Maker year-end polls and reached number two on Rolling Stone's list of best singles of the year. The single peaked at number six on the Billboard Hot 100 singles chart the same week that Nevermind reached number one on the albums chart. "Teen Spirit" hit number one on the Modern Rock Tracks chart and in April 1992 it was certified Platinum (one million copies shipped) by the Recording Industry Association of America. However, many American Top 40 stations were reluctant to play the song in regular rotation and restricted it to night-time play.

The single was also successful in other countries. In the United Kingdom, "Smells Like Teen Spirit" was released on November 18, 1991, reaching number seven on the UK Singles Chart and charting for 184 weeks. The song was nominated for two Grammy Awards: Best Hard Rock Performance with Vocal and Best Rock Song. Entertainment Weekly would later name Nirvana's loss to Eric Clapton in the Best Rock Song category as one of the 10 biggest upsets in Grammy history. Outside the United States, the song topped the charts of Belgium, France, New Zealand, and Spain. It charted within the top five of several European countries and reached number five in Australia. In Israel, it was voted in at number 2 on the IBA's "Voice of Israel" singles chart. It appeared on several year-end charts, including number 10 in New Zealand, number 17 in Belgium and Germany, and number 32 on the Billboard Hot 100 Year-End Chart.

In the wake of Nirvana's success, Michael Azerrad wrote in a 1992 Rolling Stone article: "'Smells Like Teen Spirit' is an anthem for (or is it against?) the 'Why Ask Why?' generation. Just don't call Cobain a spokesman for a generation." Nevertheless, the music press awarded the song an "anthem-of-a-generation" status, placing Cobain as a reluctant spokesman for Generation X. The New York Times wrote that "'Smells Like Teen Spirit' could be this generation's version of the Sex Pistols' 1976 single, 'Anarchy in the U.K.', if it weren't for the bitter irony that pervades its title ... as Nirvana knows only too well, teen spirit is routinely bottled, shrink-wrapped and sold".

Nirvana grew uncomfortable with the song's success and, in later concerts, often excluded it from the set list. Prior to the release of the band's 1993 follow-up album In Utero, Novoselic remarked, "If it wasn't for 'Teen Spirit' I don't know how Nevermind would have done ... There are no 'Teen Spirits' on In Utero." Cobain said in 1994, "I still like playing 'Teen Spirit', but it's almost an embarrassment to play it ... Everyone has focused on that song so much."

== Music video ==
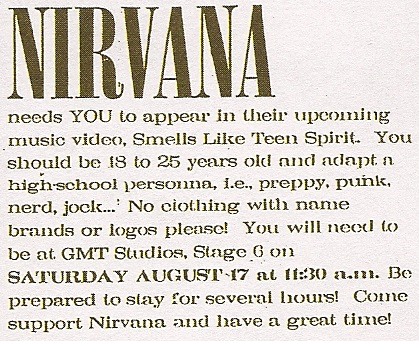
Announcement from the band encouraging people to participate in the making of the music video for "Smells Like Teen Spirit"

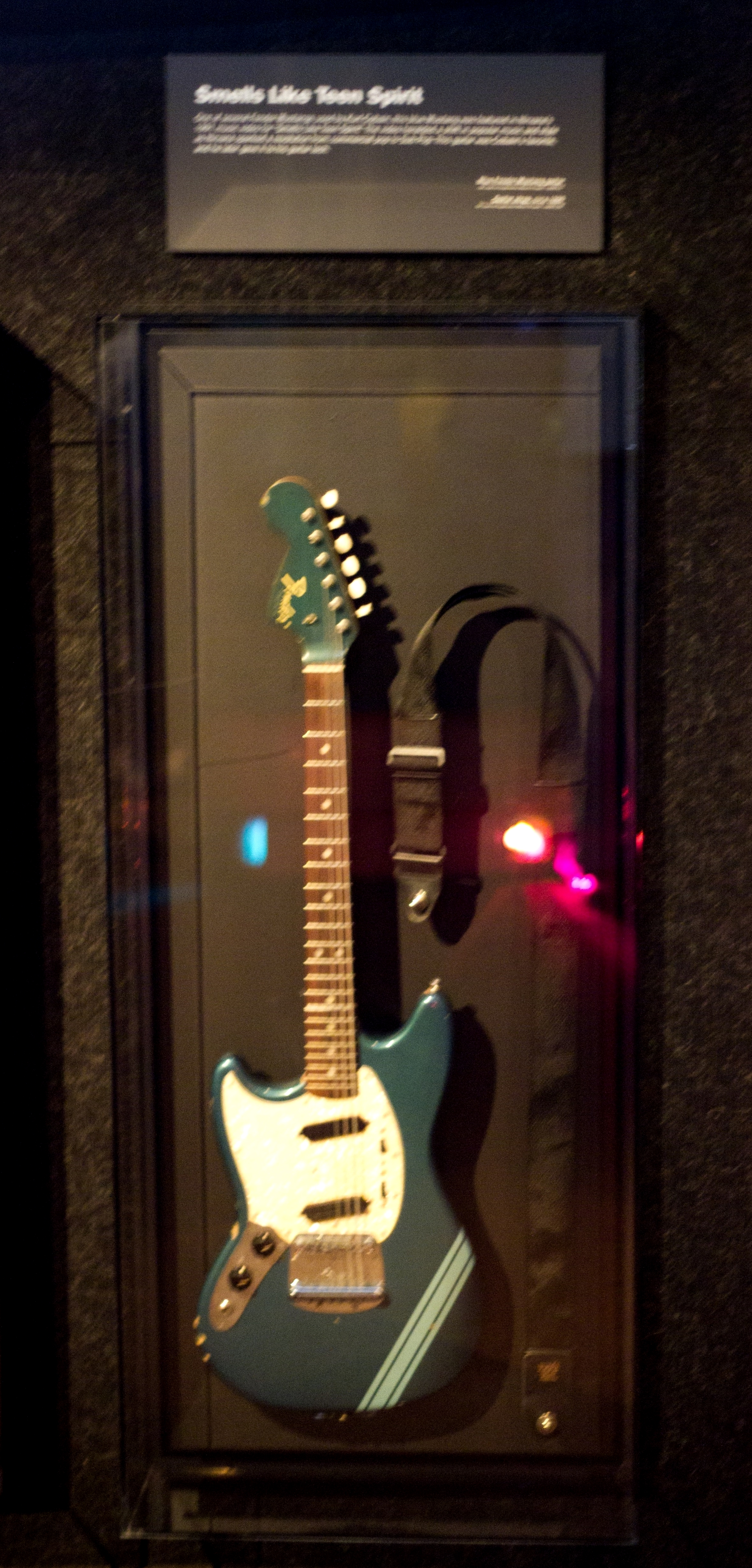
The Fender Mustang guitar played by Kurt Cobain in the "Smells Like Teen Spirit" music video

The music video for "Smells Like Teen Spirit" was the first for director Samuel Bayer. Bayer believed he was hired because his test reel was so poor the band anticipated his production would be "punk" and "not corporate". The video is based on the concept of a school concert which ends in anarchy and riot, inspired by Jonathan Kaplan's 1979 film Over the Edge and the Ramones' film Rock 'n' Roll High School. It had an estimated budget of between $30,000 and $50,000.

The video was filmed on August 17, 1991, on Stage 6 of GMT Studios in Culver City. It features Nirvana playing at a pep rally in a high school gym to an audience of apathetic students on bleachers, and cheerleaders wearing black dresses with the Circle-A anarchist symbol. The video features an appearance by Burton C. Bell, later known as frontman of heavy metal band Fear Factory. Occasionally, the scene cuts to a janitor (played by Tony De La Rosa) wearing a navy blue jumpsuit and dancing with a push broom handle. The video ends with the students destroying the set and the band's gear. The discontent was genuine; the extras who filled the bleachers had been forced to stay seated through numerous replays of the song for an entire afternoon of filming. Cobain convinced Bayer to allow the extras to mosh, and the set became a scene of chaos. "Once the kids came out dancing they just said 'fuck you', because they were so tired of his shit throughout the day," Cobain said.

Cobain disliked Bayer's final edit and oversaw a re-edit of the video, creating the final version. One of Cobain's major additions was the penultimate shot, a close-up of his face after it had been obscured for most of the video. Another major change involved two sequences of a principal standing next to a loudspeaker and being sprayed with confetti, and a teacher dressed like a nerd dancing to the song with a "Dunce" cap before being tied to a basketball hoop pole. Cobain had the principal footage and most of the teacher footage removed, aside from the ending scene which shows the teacher tied to the pole as the janitor sweeps the floor. Bayer said that unlike subsequent artists he worked with, Cobain was not vain, and was more interested that "the video had something that was truly about what they were about".

=== Reception ===
The music video received positive reviews. The Rolling Stone writer David Fricke described the video as looking like "the greatest gig you could ever imagine". In addition to a number-one placing in the singles category, "Teen Spirit" also topped the music video category in the Village Voice's 1991 "Pazz & Jop" poll. The video won Nirvana the Best New Artist and Best Alternative Group awards at the 1992 MTV Video Music Awards, and in 2000 the Guinness World Records named "Teen Spirit" the Most Played Video on MTV Europe. Amy Finnerty, formerly of MTV's Programming department, later said the video "changed the entire look of MTV" by giving them "a whole new generation to sell to".

Rolling Stone placed the music video for "Smells Like Teen Spirit" at number two on their 1993 list of "The 100 Top Music Videos". MTV ranked the song's music video at number three on its "100 Greatest Music Videos Ever Made" list in 1999. VH1 placed the debut of the "Teen Spirit" video at number eighteen on its 2000 list of "100 Greatest Rock & Roll Moments on TV", noting that it made alternative rock "a commercial and pop culture force". In 2001, VH1 named it the fourth-greatest video. The video was parodied in "Weird Al" Yankovic's music video for "Smells Like Nirvana" and referenced in Bob Sinclar's 2006 music video for "Rock This Party (Everybody Dance Now)". "Smells Like Teen Spirit" had reached one billion YouTube views by December 25, 2019, and two billion by June 12, 2025.

== Live performances ==
"Smells Like Teen Spirit" was first performed live on April 17, 1991 at the OK Hotel in Seattle, Washington. The international television debut performance of "Smells Like Teen Spirit" was on November 8, 1991, on the UK TV series The Word. Cobain opened by declaring: "I want everyone in this room to know that Courtney Love, the lead singer of the sensational pop group Hole, is the best fuck in the world." Cobain and Love married the following year.

Nirvana often altered the song's lyrics and tempo for live performances. Some live performances of the song had the line "our little group has always been" changed to "our little tribe has always been", which can be heard on the 1996 live album From the Muddy Banks of the Wishkah. Rolling Stone remarked that the Wishkah version of "Teen Spirit" "[found] Cobain's guitar reeling outside the song's melodic boundaries and sparking new life in that nearly played-out hit". A notable alternate performance of "Smells Like Teen Spirit" occurred on BBC's Top of the Pops in 1991, during which the band refused to mime to the pre-recorded backing track and Cobain deliberately sang the whole song an octave lower and altered numerous lyrics in the song (for example, "Load up on guns, bring your friends" became "Load up on drugs, kill your friends"). Cobain later said he was trying to sound like former Smiths frontman Morrissey. When Top of the Pops was cancelled in 2006, The Observer listed Nirvana's performance of "Smells Like Teen Spirit" as the third greatest in the show's history. This performance can be found on the 1994 home video Live! Tonight! Sold Out!!.

== Legacy ==
Dubbed an "anthem for apathetic kids" of Generation X, in the years following Cobain's 1994 suicide and Nirvana's breakup, "Smells Like Teen Spirit" has continued to garner critical acclaim, and is often listed as one of the greatest songs of all time. It was inducted into the Rock and Roll Hall of Fame's list of "The Songs That Shaped Rock and Roll" in 1997. In 2000, VH1 rated the song at number forty-one on its "100 Greatest Rock Songs" list, while MTV and Rolling Stone ranked it third on their joint list of the "100 Greatest Pop Songs". The Recording Industry Association of America placed "Smells Like Teen Spirit" at number eighty on their 2001 "Songs of the Century" list. In 2002, NME awarded the song the number two spot on its list of "100 Greatest Singles of All Time", with Kerrang! ranking it at number one on its own list of the "100 Greatest Singles of All Time". VH1 placed "Smells Like Teen Spirit" at number one on its list of "100 Greatest Songs of the Past 25 Years" in 2003, while that same year, the song came third in a Q poll of the "1001 Best Songs Ever". In 2021, Rolling Stone ranked "Smells Like Teen Spirit" fifth on its list of "The 500 Greatest Songs of All Time". The song was placed at number six in NME's "Global Best Song Ever Poll" in 2005. In 2022, it was included in the list "The story of NME in 70 (mostly) seminal songs": Mark Beaumont wrote that with this song, Nirvana rejuvenated American rock, "honing the melodic roars of Husker Du, Pixies, Dinosaur Jr and Sonic Youth into an MTV friendly quiet-loud dynamic".

In the 2006 VH1 UK poll The Nation's Favourite Lyric, the hook "I feel stupid and contagious / Here we are now, entertain us" was ranked the third-favorite lyric by over 13,000 voters. VH1 placed "Smells Like Teen Spirit" at number one on its list of the "100 Greatest Songs Of The '90s" in 2007, while Rolling Stone ranked it number ten on its list of "The 100 Greatest Guitar Songs of All Time". In 2009, the song was voted number one for the third time in a row on the Triple J Hottest 100 of All Time in Australia (it was first place previously in 1991 and 1998). That year, VH1 ranked the song seventh on its list of the "100 Greatest Hard Rock Songs". Despite previously proposing in its 2006 entry for Nevermind on "The All-TIME 100 Albums" that "'Smells Like Teen Spirit' ... may be the album's worst song", Time magazine later included it on its list of "The All-TIME 100 Songs" in 2011. That same year, "Smells Like Teen Spirit" kept its number nine ranking on Rolling Stone's updated list of "The 500 Greatest Songs of All Time", while in 2019, the magazine ranked it at number one in its list of "50 Best Songs of the Nineties". NME placed the song at number two on its list of the "100 Best Tracks Of The '90s" in 2012, and at number one on its list of "The 500 Greatest Songs of All Time" in 2014. In 2015, the song was also named the most iconic song of all time according to a study by Goldsmith's College, which analysed various songs featured in numerous 'all-time best' lists, using analytical software to compare their key, BPM, chord variety, lyrical content, timbral variety, and sonic variance—the result of which designated the title to this song. In 2017, it was inducted into the Grammy Hall of Fame.

"Smells Like Teen Spirit" was rereleased as a limited edition 7-inch vinyl single in December 2011. In an attempt to emulate a successful 2009 Facebook campaign to promote Rage Against the Machine's song "Killing in the Name", an online campaign was launched to promote "Smells Like Teen Spirit" to 2011 Christmas number one in the UK Singles Chart in protest at the dealings of The X Factor television series with the children's charity Rhythmix. A similar campaign was also launched in Ireland to get the track to 2011 Christmas number one in the Irish Singles Chart. The campaign resulted in the song reaching number 11 on the UK Singles Chart, selling 30,000 copies. According to Nielsen Music's year-end report for 2019, "Smells Like Teen Spirit" was the most-played song of the decade on mainstream rock radio with 145,000 spins. All of the songs in the top 10 were from the 1990s. In June 2021, "Smells Like Teen Spirit" became the second song from the 1990s to reach 1 billion streams on the Spotify platform.

== Covers and parodies ==
Tori Amos recorded the song and released it in 1992 on her "Crucify" EP single. Dave Grohl commented on Nirvana covers in 1996: "There are a few bands that go out there and do Nirvana covers and it's absolutely ridiculous, That's almost like desecration, that's what I think of it as. Tori Amos' take on it (Smells Like Teen Spirit) was fine. I mean that was pretty hilarious. She can do whatever the hell she wants." "Weird Al" Yankovic parodied the song in 1992 with "Smells Like Nirvana", a song about Nirvana itself. Cobain quickly gave permission, but asked, "It's not about food, is it?" Yankovic answered, "No, it's about how nobody can understand your lyrics." Upon hearing the parody, Cobain and his bandmates laughed hysterically. Yankovic has said Cobain told him he realized that Nirvana had "made it" when he heard the parody. In 1995, the queercore band Pansy Division released a cover version with altered lyrics titled "Smells Like Queer Spirit" on their Pile Up album. Pansy Division guitarist Jon Ginoli insisted that his band's version of the song was not a parody but "an affectionate tribute". In the 2011 film The Muppets and its soundtrack, one of the acts of the Muppet Telethon involves Rowlf the Dog, Link Hogthrob, Sam Eagle, and Beaker performing the song as a barbershop quartet, where unwilling special guest Jack Black accuses them of "ruining one of the greatest songs of all time". The 2015 film Pan features a cover of the song performed by Hugh Jackman in character as the pirate Blackbeard and other members of the cast in a musical sequence that introduces the character and his crew. It was selected for the scene after other traditional pirate songs "just wasn't jelling" with the filmmakers during rehearsals. A version recorded by singer Malia J is used in the opening credits sequence of the 2021 film Black Widow.

== Formats and track listing ==
All lyrics are written by Kurt Cobain; all music is composed by Nirvana

- US 7" single (DGCS7-19050)
1. "Smells Like Teen Spirit" – 4:38
2. "Even in His Youth" – 3:03
- US/Australian/Australasian cassette single (DGCCS-19050)
1. "Smells Like Teen Spirit" – 4:38
2. "Even in His Youth" – 3:03
- US & Australian CD single (DGCDS-21673)
1. "Smells Like Teen Spirit" – 4:38
2. "Even in His Youth" – 3:03
3. "Aneurysm" – 4:47
- UK 7" single (DGCS 5)
1. "Smells Like Teen Spirit" – 4:38
2. "Drain You" – 3:43
- UK 12" single (DGCT 5)
1. "Smells Like Teen Spirit" – 5:00 (LP Version)
2. "Drain You" – 3:43
3. "Even in His Youth" – 3:03
- UK picture disc 12" single (DGCTP 5)
1. "Smells Like Teen Spirit" – 5:00 (LP Version)
2. "Drain You" – 3:43
3. "Aneurysm" – 4:47
- UK CD single (DGCTD 5)
1. "Smells Like Teen Spirit" – 4:38
2. "Drain You" – 3:43
3. "Even in His Youth" – 3:03
4. "Aneurysm" – 4:47

== Personnel ==
Personnel adapted from Nevermind liner notes

Nirvana

- Kurt Cobain (uncredited) – guitar, vocals
- Krist Novoselic (uncredited) – bass
- Dave Grohl (uncredited) – drums

Technical personnel

- Butch Vig – producer, engineer
- Nirvana – producer, engineer
- Craig Montgomery – production and engineering on "Even in His Youth"^{†}and "Aneurysm"^{‡}
- Andy Wallace – mixing

† Appears in all release formats, except for UK 7" and some promos.
‡ Paired with the track "Even in His Youth" on CD and promo 12" only; also separately on UK 12" (picture disc).

== Charts ==
=== Weekly charts ===
1991–1992 weekly chart peaks for "Smells Like Teen Spirit"
Chart (1991–1992)	Peak position
Australia (ARIA)	5
Australia Alternative (ARIA)	1
Austria (Ö3 Austria Top 40)	8
Belgium (IFPI Belgium)	1
Belgium (Ultratop 50 Flanders)	1
Belgium (VRT Top 30 Flanders)	1
Buenos Aires (UPI)	1
Canada Top Singles (RPM)	9
Canada Contemporary Hit Radio (The Record)	17
Canada Contemporary Album Radio (The Record)	22
Denmark (ANR North Jutland)	3
European Hot 100 Singles (Music & Media)	4
European Hit Radio Top 40 (Music & Media)	31
Finland (Suomen virallinen lista)	8
France (SNEP)	1
Germany (GfK)	2
Ireland (IRMA)	15
Italy (Musica e dischi)	3
Luxembourg (Radio Luxembourg)	8
Mexico Hit Parade (Notitas Musicales)	4
Netherlands (Dutch Top 40)	3
Netherlands (Single Top 100)	3
New Zealand (Recorded Music NZ)	1
Norway (VG-lista)	2
Portugal (AFP)	2
Spain (AFYVE)	1
Sweden (Sverigetopplistan)	3
Switzerland (Schweizer Hitparade)	6
UK Singles (Official Charts)	7
UK Airplay (ERA)	32
UK Network Singles (MRIB)	7
US Billboard Hot 100	6
US Alternative Airplay (Billboard)	1
US Dance Club Songs (Billboard)	14
US Dance Singles Sales (Billboard)	27
US Mainstream Rock Airplay (Billboard)	7
US Cash Box Top 100	5
US CHR Top 40 (Radio & Records)	9
US AOR Tracks (Radio & Records)	7

2026 weekly chart peaks for "Smells Like Teen Spirit"
Chart (2026)	Peak position
Czech Republic Singles Digital (ČNS IFPI)	65
Global 200 (Billboard)	72
Greece International (IFPI)	61
US Hot Rock & Alternative Songs (Billboard)	9
Slovakia Singles Digital (ČNS IFPI)	87

=== Year-end charts ===
1991 annual chart positions for "Smells Like Teen Spirit"
Chart (1991)	Position
US Modern Rock Tracks (Billboard)	26

1992 annual chart positions for "Smells Like Teen Spirit"
Chart (1992)	Position
Australia (ARIA)	46
Australia Alternative (ARIA)	16
Belgium (Ultratop 50 Flanders)	17
Brazil (Crowley)	29
Canada Top Singles (RPM)	79
European Hot 100 Singles (Music & Media)	10
Germany (Media Control)	17
Italy (Musica e dischi)	16
Netherlands (Dutch Top 40)	29
Netherlands (Single Top 100)	28
New Zealand (RIANZ)	10
Sweden (Topplistan)	21
US Billboard Hot 100	32
US Album Rock Tracks (Billboard)	31
US Modern Rock Tracks (Billboard)	26
US Cash Box Top 100	27
US AOR Tracks (Radio & Records)	63

2011 annual chart positions for "Smells Like Teen Spirit"
Chart (2011)	Position
UK Singles (OCC)	184

2021 annual chart positions for "Smells Like Teen Spirit"
Chart (2021)	Position
Global 200 (Billboard)	113
Portugal (AFP)	182

2022 annual chart positions for "Smells Like Teen Spirit"
Chart (2022)	Position
Global 200 (Billboard)	86

2023 annual chart positions for "Smells Like Teen Spirit"
Chart (2023)	Position
Global 200 (Billboard)	169

2025 annual chart positions for "Smells Like Teen Spirit"
Chart (2025)	Position
Global 200 (Billboard)	118

=== Decade-end charts ===
Decade-end broadcast chart peaks for "Smells Like Teen Spirit"
Chart (2010–2019)	Position
US Mainstream Rock (Nielsen Music)	1
Canadian Mainstream Rock Radio (Billboard)	1

== Certifications ==
Certifications for "Smells Like Teen Spirit"
Region	Certification	Certified units/sales
Australia (ARIA)	12× Platinum	840,000^{‡}
Brazil (Pro-Música Brasil)	2× Platinum	120,000^{‡}
Canada (Music Canada)	8× Platinum	640,000^{‡}
Denmark (IFPI Danmark)	4× Platinum	360,000^{‡}
Germany (BVMI)	5× Gold	1,500,000^{‡}
Italy (FIMI) Sales since 2009	3× Platinum	300,000^{‡}
New Zealand (RMNZ)	8× Platinum	240,000^{‡}
Portugal (AFP)	5× Platinum	125,000^{‡}
Spain (Promusicae)	3× Platinum	180,000^{‡}
Sweden (GLF)	Gold	25,000^{^}
United Kingdom (BPI) Sales since 2004	6× Platinum	3,600,000^{‡}
United States (RIAA)	Diamond	10,000,000^{‡}
Streaming
Denmark (IFPI Danmark)	Gold	900,000^{†}
Greece (IFPI Greece)	3× Platinum	6,000,000^{†}
^{^} Shipments figures based on certification alone.^{‡} Sales+streaming figures based on certification alone.^{†} Streaming-only figures based on certification alone.

== See also ==
- List of best-selling singles
- List of highest-certified singles in Australia
- List of highest-certified digital singles in the United States

== Bibliography ==
- Azerrad, Michael. Come as You Are: The Story of Nirvana. Doubleday, 1994. ISBN 0-385-47199-8
- Classic Albums: Nirvana – Nevermind [DVD]. Isis Productions, 2004.
- Berkenstadt, Jim; Cross, Charles. Classic Rock Albums: Nevermind. Nirvana. Schirmer, 1998. ISBN 0-02-864775-0
- Crisafulli, Chuck. Teen Spirit: The Stories Behind Every Nirvana Song. Carlton, 1996. ISBN 0-684-83356-5
- Cross, Charles R. Heavier Than Heaven. Hyperion, 2001. ISBN 0-7868-6505-9
- Marsh, Dave. Louie Louie. Hyperion, 1993. ISBN 1-56282-865-7
- Rooksby, Rikki. Inside Classic Rock Tracks. Backbeat, 2001. ISBN 0-87930-654-8
- Starr, Larry; Waterman, Christopher. American Popular Music: From Minstrelsy to MTV. New York: Oxford University Press, 2003. ISBN 0-19-510854-X
