= Trash (Roxy Music song) =

Single by Roxy Music

from the album Manifesto
- B-side: "Trash 2"
- Released: 23 February 1979
- Recorded: 1978–1979
- Studio: Ridge Farm Studio (Rusper); Basing Street Studios (London)
- Genre: Art rock; punk rock; new wave
- Length: 2:13
- Label: Island; Polydor
- Songwriters: Bryan Ferry; Phil Manzanera
- Producer: Roxy Music

Roxy Music singles chronology
"Both Ends Burning" (1975)	"Trash" (1979)	"Dance Away" (1979)

Music video
- "Trash" on YouTube

"Trash" is a single by the English rock band Roxy Music taken from their sixth studio album Manifesto (1979), their first after the comeback that followed the three years hiatus. It peaked at number 40 on the UK singles chart. "Trash" was backed by a softened arrangement of the same song, called "Trash 2", which was made available on the four-CD compilation box set The Thrill of It All (1995).

American queercore band Pansy Division recorded a cover version of "Trash," which appears on their extended play (EP) Touch My Joe Camel and the compilation album Pile Up (1995).

== Personnel ==
Roxy Music

- Bryan Ferry – vocals, keyboards
- Andy Mackay – oboe, saxophone
- Phil Manzanera – electric guitar
- Paul Thompson – drums

Additional musicians

- Gary Tibbs – bass
- Paul Carrack – keyboards
