= Marcus Ewert =

American poet

- Born: 1972 (age 53–54); Atlanta, Georgia, United States
- Occupations: Writer; actor; film director

Marcus Ewert, previously known as Mark Ewert, is an American writer, actor and director, living in San Francisco.

Ewert began making and appearing in films in the 1990s. He has appeared in the Gus Van Sant short film Four Boys on the Road in a Volvo, in Sadie Benning's Flat Is Beautiful, and the movie Frisk by Todd Verow. In 2008, the feature film The Lollipop Generation by G.B. Jones was released starring Mark Ewert in a lead role, alongside Jena von Brucker, Vaginal Davis, Calvin Johnson, Joel Gibb and Scott Treleaven.

Ewert's first collaborative work as a director was with Joshua Tager: together they made A New Flag. He then began collaborating with David Crystallah, making several films together in 1998. These films played frequently at film festivals. In 1999, he began working with David Cutler. The two created Piki & Poko, first released in the 2000s (decade). These animated short flash cartoons created for the Internet were immediately successful and have been distributed by Mondo Mini Shows. There have been thirty three episodes scripted and twenty eight have been released. The episode entitled Taking The Dare! also appeared on Season 6 of the Emmy Award winning PBS series, Independent Lens. The series began airing on the Logo channel in 2008, as part of the Alien Boot Camp animation anthology.

Ewert is also a writer. His work has appeared in a number of anthologies and other publications including the 2004 Lambda Literary Award winning non-fiction anthology I Do/ I Don't. He has participated in the 'Litquake Literary Festival' and the 'Porch Light' reading series, both held in San Francisco. He has appeared in such literary journals as Shampoo, Suspect Thoughts, Star*line, and For Immediate Release. He was co-editor (with Mitchell Watkins) of Ruh Roh, an anthology of artists' work that included pieces by Kathy Acker, Allen Ginsberg, Gregg Araki, Clive Barker, Sadie Benning, Dennis Cooper, Mike Diana, G.B. Jones, Paul McCarthy, Gus van Sant, and many others. His first book 10,000 Dresses, illustrated by Rex Ray, was published by Seven Stories Press in September 2008. 10,000 Dresses was recognized by the American Library Association on the 2009 Rainbow Book List, as a Stonewall Children's and Young Adult Literature Honorbook, and a 2008 Lambda Literary Award Finalist.

Ewert was the last lover of William S. Burroughs, which he has written about for publication, and as a lover of Allen Ginsberg's while at Naropa University. As of 2008, he was writing his memoirs of these, and other events.

Ewert has been the subject of the work of several artists; the writers Allen Ginsberg and Dennis Cooper; and the photographers Daniel Nicoletta, and Marc Geller, whose well-known photos of Mark and Moon Trent are featured on the covers of three Pansy Division CDs, Deflowered (1994), Wish I'd Taken Pictures (1996), and Quite Contrary (2016).

== Filmography ==
=== As director ===
- Piki & Poko (with David Cutler) 2002 – (Thirty Three episodes)
- Porno Bondage (with David Cutler) 1999
- Baby Spice With Angel Dust ( with David Crystallah) 1998
- Dickcam: Balls & Nuts (with David Crystallah) 1998
- Inside Scoop (with David Crystallah) 1998
- Lesbian Separatist Barbie (with David Crystallah) 1998
- A New Flag (with Joshua Tager) 1996

=== As actor ===
- The Lollipop Generation, directed by G.B. Jones, 2008
- Flat Is Beautiful, short directed by Sadie Benning, 1998
- Frisk, minor role, directed by Todd Verow, 1996
- Four Boys on the Road in a Volvo, short directed by Gus Van Sant

== Publications ==
- Mummy Cat, Marcus Ewert, illustrations by Lisa Brown, Clarion Books, 2015: ISBN 978-0544340824
- 10,000 Dresses, Marcus Ewert, illustrations by Rex Ray, Seven Stories Press, 2008 ISBN 1-58322-850-0
- Twenty Epics, "Choose Your Own Epic Adventure", edited by Susan Groppi and David Moles, Lulu, 2006: ISBN 978-1-84728-066-4
- Best Gay Erotica 2006, edited by Richard Labonte and Matt Bernstein Sycamore, Cleis Press, 2006: ISBN 978-1-57344-225-1
- I Do/ I Don't: Queers On Marriage, edited by Greg Wharton and Ian Philips, Suspect Thoughts Press, 2004: ISBN 0-9746388-7-0
- Pills, Chills, Thrills and Heartache: Adventures in the First Person, edited by Michelle Tea and Clint Catalyst, Alyson Publications, 2004 ISBN 978-1-55583-753-2
- Van Gogh's Ear, French Connection Press, 2003, ISBN 2-914853-01-7
- Ruh Roh, edited by Mark Ewert and Mitchell Watkins, published by Feature Inc. and Instituting Contemporary Idea, NYC, 1992
