= Rex Ray =

American artist (1956–2015)

- Born: Michael Patterson; September 11, 1956 near Landstuhl, West Germany
- Died: February 9, 2015 (aged 58); San Francisco, California, U.S.
- Education: San Francisco Art Institute
- Known for: graphic design, collage, fine art
- Website: http://www.rexraystudio.com/

Rex Ray (born Michael Patterson; September 11, 1956 – February 9, 2015) was an American collage artist and graphic designer, based in San Francisco.

== Early life and education ==
Born as Michael Patterson on September 11, 1956, on a United States Army base near Landstuhl, Germany, and he was raised in Colorado Springs, Colorado. He started making art in childhood, and by the 1970s he was part of the mail art movement which was when he adopted the pseudonym "Rey Ray" based on a 1950s toy raygun brand of the same name. He said he changed his name to Rex Ray in order to start anew and be free of his past.

He moved to San Francisco in 1981 to attend San Francisco Art Institute (SFAI) where he studied with Sam Tchakalian, Kathy Acker, and Angela Davis before earning his BFA in 1989. He was one of the first artists to use Mac-based technologies, largely because of his work with The Residents, in the creative process to generate graphics and fine art. Ray combined his digital graphics with Xerography, handmade woodblock prints, newsprint, and magazine images to creative his signature style, which references decorative arts and 20th century movements such as dada, Fluxus, pop art, and especially midcentury modernism.

== Career ==
Ray's early designs include the first T-shirt and posters for the San Francisco chapter of the AIDS activist group ACT UP; guerrilla marketing fliers and posters for queer night clubs and rock and roll shows; and book covers for independent presses such as City Lights Books and High Risk/Serpent's Tail. He designed and performed with The Residents, as well as designed for David Bowie, among others.

By the early 1990s he started a professional fine art practice. Ray had been one of the first artists to use Mac computer-based technology to create his art. He had two units in the Allied Box Factory building in the Mission District in San Francisco, one was his living space and the other was his art studio.

Ray referred to his artwork as "paintings" even though they were often collage-based and lacked any traditional painting techniques. His source material was made with woodblock printing on colored paper. The sheets of printed paper were adhered to a canvas with a wet glue. As the glue got tacky, Ray would cut patterns into the papers, removing the extraneous paper, leaving the hand cut shapes to dry. Hi s large-scale canvases would require weeks of intensive labor and were composed of dozens of layers of cut, painted paper.

In 2008, Ray illustrated 10,000 Dresses, written by Marcus Ewert. The illustrations for the book were created using his cut-paper collage methods. The book was a 2010 Stonewall Honor Book in Children and Young Adult Literature, a 2009 American Library Association Rainbow Book and was a finalist for the 2008 Lambda Literary Award for Transgender Literature. Despite these being honored with these awards, 10,000 Dresses experienced mixed opinions on whether or not it was appropriate to teach to its intended audience of young children.

Ray died February 9, 2015, in San Francisco after a five year battle with lymphoma. He was remembered by The Guardian "as a major cultural force in the Bay Area of San Francisco, California, widely recognized for his collage work." Ray was also remembered by SFGate as a, "versatile graphic designer who created book covers, tour posters and album art in San Francisco for 35 years."

== Legacy ==
In 2019 GLBT Historical Society presented A Picture is a Word: The Posters of Rex Ray. The exhibition, curated by Cydney Payton and Amy Scholder, surveyed the graphic works. Including his work with David Bowie, Radiohead, REM.

The collection of the San Francisco Museum of Modern Art includes 37 posters by Rex Ray for musical artists including David Bowie, The B-52s, and The Rolling Stones. In 2024, SFMoMA featured many of Ray's poster designs in Art of Noise, an exhibition celebrating groundbreaking design shaping our music experience. His work is also in the collections of the San Jose Museum of Art and the Yerba Buena Center for the Arts in San Francisco.

A drawing of Rex Ray by Veronica De Jesus is in the collection of the Berkeley Art Museum and Pacific Film Archive.

Archival collections of Ray’s work are preserved by the Bancroft Library at the University of California, Berkeley; the Rock and Roll Hall of Fame in Cleveland; and the GLBT Historical Society in San Francisco.

In 2026–2017, a retrospective of title Rex Ray: We Are All Made of Light will held at the Monterey Museum of Art in Monterey, California. The exhibition was curated by Griff Williams and Cydney Payton.

== Publications ==
- Ewert, Marcus (2008). 10,000 Dresses. Illustrated by Rex Ray. New York City: Seven Stories Press. ISBN 978-1-58322-850-0.
- Ray, Rex (2007). Rex Ray: Art + Design. Foreword by Douglas Coupland. San Francisco: Chronicle Books. ISBN 978-0-8118-5975-2.
- Ray, Rex (2011). Information. Essay by Cydney Payton. San Francisco: Rex Ray Inc.
- Williams, Griff; Killian, Kevin; Barilleaux, Rene P.; Cole, Norma (2017). Rex Ray We Are All Made of Light. Gallery 16. Chronicle Books. ISBN 0982767161.
- Williams, Griff (2020) The Art of Rex Ray. (essays by Rebecca Solnit and Christian Frock). San Francisco: Chronicle Books. ISBN 978-1452177045
