= 10,000 Dresses =

2008 picture book by Marcus Ewert

- Author: Marcus Ewert
- Illustrator: Rex Ray
- Cover artist: Rex Ray
- Language: English
- Genre: Picture book
- Publisher: Seven Stories Press
- Publication date: November 2008
- Publication place: United States
- Media type: Print (hardcover)
- Pages: 32
- ISBN: 1-58322-850-0
- OCLC: 216939889

10,000 Dresses is a 2008 children's picture book written by Marcus Ewert, illustrated by Rex Ray and published by Seven Stories Press. It is about a young transgender girl named Bailey who dreams of wearing extravagant dresses. When she comes to her parents for help, they are not particularly accepting, but she eventually meets a friend inspired by her courage who is willing to help her out. The book is notable for being one of the first children's books depicting transgender people's experiences.

10,000 Dresses and other books of the same genre have received criticism for the lack of diversity in their LGBTQ+ protagonists. Although its acceptance by the LGBTQ+ community has earned it several awards, the picture book suffers from controversy, having been banned or challenged at particular institutions.

== Summary ==
The story is told from the viewpoint of Bailey, a young transgender girl who dreams of dresses. She dreams of mystical dresses made with a variety of designs including flowers, rainbows, and windows. Bailey then tells her parents about these dresses and asks for their help in finding them as she really wants to wear them. At first, however, they become angry, and tell her, "You're a BOY", and "You shouldn't be thinking about dresses at all". Even her older brother calls her "gross" and threatens to hurt her. But soon Bailey meets an older woman named Laurel from across the street who seems more accepting about Bailey's love of dresses. Laurel is inspired by Bailey's courageous spirit so they quickly become friends. Laurel explains that although she wants to make dresses with her sewing machine, she does not have any design ideas. With Laurel's help, Bailey designs a dress with mirrors on it and is able to express herself in the way that she has always wanted.

== Genre ==
10,000 Dresses is an LGBTQ+ picture book designed for elementary school children to be shared in a classroom setting. Books in this genre are often used in classrooms to introduce and discuss LGBTQ+ topics. Teacher and psychologist Jennifer Burke, for example, read 10,000 Dresses to her third-grade class, which led to a discussion about determining gender. Many of her students claimed that the length of one's hair could be used to identify their gender. This conversation was followed by students introducing additional topics, including discussion about how clothing selection and toys characterize their gender.

Furthermore, this genre is very often criticized for focusing on "boys in dresses", reflecting "stereotypical gendered interests" as well as a lack of diversity in the protagonists' families. 10,000 Dresses and most other books in this genre focus on a "boy" with interests that are typically associated with females, like, as seen in 10,000 Dresses, wearing dresses. Some people, such as Robert Bittner, suggest that it is important to circumvent a "universalizing narrative" with more varied stories of members of the LGBTQ+ community. Professor Stephen Adam Crawley also recognizes the lack of diversity in that most of the stories in this genre deal with "White, middle class characters living in households with two cisgender, heterosexual parents."

== Analysis ==
In the scholarly source Children, Sexuality, and the Law, Sacha Coupet writes that although 10,000 Dresses explores gender non-conformance, especially among younger audiences, it is less focused on the transgender experience specifically. Ewert has similarly expressed that the book explores non-conformance; in an interview, Ewert states that 10,000 Dresses is "'not an assimilationist 'We're Just Like You' book! It doesn't end with Bailey changing to fit into the status quo'." Instead, claims Exert, the book is about how to embrace your differences even when others don't.

== Reception ==
10,000 Dresses is a 2010 Stonewall Honor Book in Children and Young Adult Literature, a 2009 American Library Association Rainbow Book and was a finalist in the 2008 Lambda Literary Awards.

In addition to these awards, however, 10,000 Dresses has also experienced mixed opinions on whether or not it is appropriate to be taught to its intended audience of young children. For example, in Cuero, Texas, the picture book was banned by the Cuero Independent School District from John C. French Elementary School for its "politically, racially, or socially offensive" material. In another incident, parent Nathan Pollnow filed a complaint with the Columbus School District in 2020, arguing that "You are either a boy or you are a girl. That is the way you are born. Until you are of age, you really shouldn't have to know there's a difference. That's health class in high school, maybe earlier in junior high. But definitely not kindergarten." The district held a meeting and ultimately decided against banning 10,000 Dresses. With regard to library boards banning books like 10,000 Dresses, many believe LGBTQ+ and independent bookstores have the responsibility to advocate for this type of literature.

Reviewers such as Dana Rudolph are bothered by the deeply negative reaction and lack of acceptance shown by Bailey's family. Ewert himself recognizes that he is "walking a fine line" between showing how parents might actually react and frightening students who read the book, yet he still believes it is a good mechanism for conjuring discussion between parents and children. Additionally, social policy researchers Dr. Clare Bartholomaeus and Dr. Damien Riggs suggest that 10,000 Dresses and other similar stories should be included on primary school reading lists. According to Dr. Riggs, "Many of the students thought (a gender transitioning character) was magic ... as the sessions progressed, though, most showed a greater understanding."

== See also ==
- William's Doll (1972)
- My Princess Boy (2009)
