= Deflowered =

Studio album by Pansy Division
- Released: June 1994
- Recorded: December 1993–January 1994
- Studio: Komotion in San Francisco
- Genres: Queercore, pop-punk, power pop
- Length: 43:26
- Label: Lookout!

Pansy Division chronology
Undressed (1993)	Deflowered (1994)	Pile Up (1995)

Deflowered is the second studio album by American queercore band Pansy Division, released in 1994 on Lookout! Records.

The cover features a photograph of Mark Ewert (left) and Joey Smith (right), taken by Marc Geller. Ewert also appears on the cover of Pansy Division's 1996 album Wish I'd Taken Pictures and their 2016 album Quite Contrary.

== Critical reception ==
Professional ratings
Review scores
Source	Rating
AllMusic	3/5 stars
MusicHound Rock: The Essential Album Guide	2/5 stars

AllMusic praised Deflowered for its "wry, silly and heartfelt" songwriting, singling out singer Jon Ginoli's "engagingly nerdish" vocals and "sweetly enjoyable" harmonizing with bassist Chris Freeman. Trouser Press wrote that "Ginoli’s melodic constructs are appreciably better on Deflowered; a raunchier guitar sound gives the improved second album more punk body." The Dallas Observer called the album "snappy" and "rollicking," and deemed it the band's best.

== Track listing ==
All songs written by Jon Ginoli, except where noted.

1. "Reciprocate" – 2:52
2. "Groovy Underwear" – 3:38
3. "Anonymous" – 2:55
4. "Fluffy City" – 3:22
5. "James Bondage" (Chris Freeman) – 2:51
6. "Negative Queen" – 3:21
7. "Denny" (Ginoli, Healey) – 2:38
8. "Rachbottomoff" – 4:02
9. "Beercan Boy" – 2:13
10. "Kissed" (Ginoli, Freeman) – 2:29
11. "A Song of Remembrance for Old Boyfriends" (Jonathan Richman) – 3:26
12. "Deep Water" – 2:08
13. "Not Enough of You to Go Around" – 2:23
14. "New Pleasures" – 3:31
15. "Homosapien" (Pete Shelley) – 2:18

== Personnel ==
- Jon Ginoli – vocals, guitars
- Chris Freeman – vocals, bass, lead vocals on track 5
- Lliam Hart – drums
