= Total Entertainment! =

Studio album by Pansy Division
- Released: August 12, 2003
- Genres: Queercore, punk rock
- Length: 45:20
- Label: Alternative Tentacles
- Producer: Chris Xefos

Pansy Division chronology
Absurd Pop Song Romance (1998)	Total Entertainment! (2003)	The Essential Pansy Division (2006)

Total Entertainment! is a studio album by American queercore band Pansy Division. It was released in 2003 by Alternative Tentacles.

== Critical reception ==
Professional ratings
Review scores
Source	Rating
AllMusic	4/5 stars

Now called the album "a goofy alt-rock amusement park ride of a record, with more hooks than a crocheting bee in a doily-happy nursing home and the gayest lyrics this side of Rufus Wainwright." The Richmond Times-Dispatch called it "pipin' with hilarity and crunching power pop." The Advocate called it the band's "most varied effort to date."

== Track listing ==
No.	Title	Writer(s)	Length
0.	"untitled pre-gap track"		0:55
1.	"Who Treats You Right?"	lyrics: Ginoli, music: Ginoli/Freeman	2:20
2.	"Blurry Down Below"	lyrics: Ginoli, music: Ginoli/Freeman/Goodwin/Illades	2:19
3.	"When He Comes Home"	Freeman	2:59
4.	"Too Many Hoops"	lyrics: Ginoli, music: Ginoli/Freeman	2:54
5.	"Spiral"	Freeman	3:09
6.	"Saddest Song"	lyrics: Ginoli, music: Ginoli/Freeman/Goodwin	3:13
7.	"No Protection"	lyrics: Freeman/Ginoli, music: Freeman/Ginoli/Goodwin	3:59
8.	"Alpine Skiing"	Ginoli	3:14
9.	"Not Good Enough"	Freeman	1:20
10.	"Scared to Death"	Freeman	2:02
11.	"I'm Alright"	Ginoli	2:30
12.	"First Betrayal"	Freeman	4:02
13.	"Sleeping in the Cold"	lyrics: Freeman, music: Freeman/Ginoli/Goodwin/Illades	4:23
14.	"He Whipped My Ass in Tennis, Then I Fucked His Ass in Bed"	Ginoli	2:08
15.	"Total Entertainment"	lyrics: Ginoli/Goodwin, music: Goodwin/Freeman/Ginoli	2:07
16.	"At the Mall" (Bonus track unlisted on the back cover, but listed in the lyric sheet)	Ginoli	12:06
Total length:			45:20

0 is about 40 seconds of silence, followed by what sounds like a movie sample, set in a record store, in which a woman offers to play the new Pansy Division they just got in and a man declines. 16 is preceded by a 2:55 silent pre-gap.

== Personnel ==
Pansy Division

- Chris Freeman – bass, vocals
- Jon Ginoli – rhythm guitar, vocals
- Patrick Goodwin – lead guitar, vocals
- Luis Illades – drums, saxophone, vocals

Additional musicians

- Victor Krummenacher – acoustic guitar on track 6
- Scott Wagar – tambourine on tracks 2 and 4
- Danny Cao – trumpet on tracks 7, 8 and 10
- Doug Hilsinger – pedal steel guitar on track 14
- Josh Pollock – banjo on track 14
- Chris Xefos – keyboards
