= Quite Contrary =

Studio album by Pansy Division
- Released: September 9, 2016
- Genres: Queercore, pop-punk, power pop
- Label: Alternative Tentacles
- Producer: Pansy Division

Pansy Division chronology
That's So Gay (2009)	Quite Contrary (2016)

Quite Contrary is the seventh studio album, ninth album overall, by American queercore band Pansy Division, it was released on September 9, 2016 by Alternative Tentacles.

The cover features cover models Marcus Ewert and Moon Trent, who were the cover models for Pansy Division's 1996 album Wish I'd Taken Pictures. The band has playfully called Quite Contrary their “grandpa record”—intended to describe growing older for a generation of gay men whose role models were decimated by AIDS.

== Track listing ==
No.	Title	Writer(s)	Length
1.	"He's Trouble"	Ginoli	3:15
2.	"Love Came Along"	Freeman	3:38
3.	"You're on the Phone"	Reader, Freeman, Illades	2:22
4.	"Kiss Me at Midnight (New Year's Eve)"	Ginoli	3:45
5.	"Halfway to Nowhere"	Freeman	3:06
6.	"Work on It, Babe"	Ginoli	3:01
7.	"I'm the Friend"	Ginoli	2:27
8.	"Blame the Bible"	Reader, Freeman, Illades	3:38
9.	"Mistakes"	Ginoli	2:07
10.	"It's a Sin"	Neil Tennant, Chris Lowe	3:37
11.	"My Heart Aches for You"	Ginoli	2:09
12.	"(Is This What It's Like) Getting Old"	Freeman	2:52
13.	"Too Much to Ask"	Ginoli	3:11
14.	"Something Beautiful"	Ginoli	4:49

== Personnel ==
- Jon Ginoli – guitar, vocals
- Chris Freeman – bass, vocals
- Luis Illades – drums, percussion
- Joel Reader – lead guitar, vocals
