= My Princess Boy =

2009 picture book by Cheryl Kilodavis

- Author: Cheryl Kilodavis
- Illustrator: Suzanne DeSimone
- Cover artist: Suzanne DeSimone
- Language: English
- Genre: Picture book
- Publisher: KD Talent, LLC
- Publication date: 2009
- Publication place: United States
- Media type: Print
- Pages: 36
- ISBN: 9781442429888
- OCLC: 681503510

My Princess Boy is a 2009 children's picture book written by Cheryl Kilodavis and illustrated by Suzanne DeSimone. The story centers on a boy who likes "pretty things" and prefers to wear tiaras and "girly dresses." The story informs readers about supporting children regardless of their expression. Despite the attention he receives regarding his appearance, the Princess Boy always has the love and support of his family throughout the entire story.

While being controversial and frequently challenged, scholars advocate the book for its ability to introduce the idea of diversity in gender expression simply in homes, classrooms, counseling offices, and public libraries.

== Plot ==
My Princess Boy begins with the narrator (and mother) introducing the Princess Boy and his many interests. The narrator describes the Princess Boy's family relationships and friendships. Next, the narrator expresses the conflict that arises with the Princess Boy's non-conforming gender identity and expression. In particular, the narrator recounts individuals laughing and staring at the Princess Boy when he wears or buys girly things. Throughout the entire story, the Princess Boy's family is steadfast in their reassurance, support, and love for the Princess Boy.

== Background ==
The story was inspired by Kilodavis' son, Dyson. Kilodavis being a mother of a child who did not conform to stereotypical gender norms, wanted to advocate for the acceptance of gender differences. When her son Dyson was about two, he began creating his own personal style consisting of jewelry and dresses. Around this time was when Dyson proclaimed to her, "I am a Princess Boy, Mommy!"

Kilodavis also admitted to a delayed acceptance towards her role as being a mother of a gender nonconforming child. Kilodavis initially imposed "boy" things onto her son while pushing him away from "girly" things. Finally, Kilodavis' older son, Dkobe, brought about a turning point: When Dkobe was six he asked his mother, "My can't you just let him be happy, Mom?" At this point, Kilodavis recognized that her older son's words would affect her and her family for good. Additionally, Kilodavis' inability to find empowering or positive books for her son Dyson also played an influential role in pushing her towards creating My Princess Boy.

Kilodavis also mentioned that her upbringing played an extremely critical role in teaching her how to live spiritually, be self-aware, and sense what feels morally right from wrong. Kilodavis admitted that growing up, her socioeconomic and racial status made it harder for her to fit in as well. She too did not fit into the gender dichotomy of female stereotypes. Often, she was exploited when participating in male-dominated activities, due to her gender and race. She was further frustrated at the interplay between race and gender in society, and how she never saw examples of strong and powerful women in literature.

Finally, Kilodavis stated that Free to Be… You and Me by Marlo Thomas impacted her implicitly, as an author and mother, particularly with the book's themes of respect and acceptance. Furthermore, Kilodavis stated that Free to Be... You are Me helped set a foundation for her own book to be successfully received by adults who also felt different.

Lastly, Kilodavis affirmed that she wrote the story as a tool to help people start a discussion on the acceptance of diversity.

== Analysis ==
According to The Horn Book Guide to Children's and Young Adult Books, although Kilodavis, inspired by her son, admirably addresses gender identity in young children, she "doesn’t prevail over taboo due to her text’s oversimplification and didacticism." Additionally, The Horn Book Guide to Children's and Young Adult Books contends that the "pink-heavy illustrations showing featureless characters are off-putting."

Alison Donnelly from The School Library Journal, on the other hand, maintains that Kilodavis, through her own experiences and the experiences of her son Dyson, is able to introduce themes such as identity, acceptance, individuality, and bullying. Donnelly claims that the book ultimately focuses around the themes of societal acceptance, unconditional love, and a unified family. Lastly, as asserted by Donnelly, My Princess Boy is also a call for tolerance, diversity, and the termination of judgment and bullying.

DeSimone’s illustrations in My Princess Boy include featureless characters. Kilodavis, having worked with DeSimone in the past, asked her to create "illustrations based on family photos." Although featureless, the illustrations are positive, bright, and colorful. "In the cartoon illustrations, stars pop into view and rise through pick skies as touches send balls bouncing cause flowers to emit rapid drumbeats and make the and the other weirdly faceless human figures dance." "Children may ask why the people depicted have no faces which may spark discussions about how we are all the same."

In "Pedi-Files: Reading the Foot in Contemporary Illustrated Children's Literature," Jennifer Miskec introduces the idea of boys being portrayed as feminized and "eroticized" while being en point. Miskec points out that the Princess Boy, throughout My Princess Boy, is portrayed en pointe. In one particular illustration, the Princess Boy is "on the tips of his pink shoes' toes, mirrored by his female playmate who is likewise en pointe in red shoes, directly and obviously showing his closer association with the female." The Princess Boy's father, brother, and other male figures are depicted as standing flat-footed. Additionally, the Princess Boy's femininity is further articulated through "his blank face, without eyes, nose, or mouth, en pointe and silenced like classical ballerinas before him." To Miskec, this translates as being the Princess Boy's fulfillment of his own feminine fantasy.

Lastly, Kilodavis concludes with the statement "My Princess Boy is your Princess Boy", a sentiment suggesting that Kilodavis' intended audience is in large part for parents as well.

== Publication ==
After communicating with Dyson's daycare, Kilodavis decided to write My Princess Boy as an avenue of expressing her support for her son. After contacting her illustrator, she distributed a locally copied, “glue-bound” book to Dyson's teacher. After creating an online website to sell copies, an influx of book orders and support strained Kilodavis’ ability to meet demands and produce a sufficient amount of the more expensive, locally copied books.

Initially, Kilodavis hired a local book printer to produce and sell 100 books on Amazon, however, after the copy was introduced to Seattle's NBC affiliate and appeared on a daytime talk show, the floodgates opened. “Within 24 hours there was a waiting list for the book, and I received more than 500 e-mails of support. It was an international response that was overwhelming."

After much media attention, Kilodavis ultimately connected with Simon & Schuster's children's division.

When Kilodavis originally decided to publish through Amazon, she was fearful that they would change her storyline. “Back when I decided to put the book on Amazon, I knew I could submit it into a publisher, but I was so afraid they would change the story. Since this is nonfiction- and my tool- I couldn’t risk having anyone change it. At Simon & Schuster, they wanted to publish it as it was."

Simon & Schuster quickly closed the deal and published the book within two months.

== Reception ==
Educators often utilize My Princess Boy for introducing topics and themes relating to gender. The utilization of My Princess Boy has opened outlets to exploring diverse experiences through literature, but has also conversely sparked much controversy across the United States.

In 2014, fifty-two patrons in Granbury, Texas challenged the inclusion of the book in Hood County Library's collection. When the library's director, Courtney Kincaid, defended the book's inclusion, objectors took their complaint to the commissioners' court (a county legislative body in some U.S. states). The court effectively upheld Kincaid's decision by declining to vote on the matter.

On October 12, 2015, the principal at Nova Classical Academy in St. Paul, Minnesota informed parents that the school would be supporting a student who was gender non-conforming. In an email, the principal asked for kindergarten parents to talk with their children about appropriate and respectful conduct when engaging with gender non-conforming identities. Upon learning that the non-conforming student was in kindergarten, many parents became concerned with the issue of gender identity being imposed onto their young children. Furthermore, several parents became increasingly apprehensive about the inclusion of My Princess Boy in the curriculum. The spectrum became prominently split with supporters launching petitions in favor of My Princess Boy and objectors either worried about bathroom policies, or leaving the Academy all together. There was a significant drop-off in applications and increase in declined offers of enrollment for the 2016–17 school year. The school later went on to replace My Princess Boy with poems depicting similar themes.

In November 2019, many Loudoun County parents became outraged due to books placed in curriculums as a part of “a new Diverse Classroom Library Initiative." Several books, one being My Princess Boy, were assigned throughout the school district to introduce kids to a variety of cultures and races, yet many parents were alarmed with the influx of books centered on “sexual diversity” and “LGBT ideology."

== See also ==
- Heather Has Two Mommies (1989)
- Daddy's Roommate (1991)
- 10,000 Dresses (2008)
- Book censorship
- Gay literature
