= Wish I'd Taken Pictures =

Studio album by Pansy Division
- Released: February 13, 1996
- Recorded: November 1995
- Studio: Razor's Edge in San Francisco
- Genre: Queercore, pop-punk, power pop
- Length: 34:16
- Label: Lookout!, Mint
- Producer: Pansy Division

Pansy Division chronology
Pile Up (1995)	Wish I'd Taken Pictures (1996)	More Lovin' from Our Oven (1997)

Professional ratings
Review scores
Source	Rating
AllMusic	4/5 stars

Wish I'd Taken Pictures is the third studio album, fourth album overall, by American queercore band Pansy Division, released on February 13, 1996 by Lookout! Records and Mint Records.

The front and back covers feature photographs of Mark Ewert and Moon Trent, taken by Marc Geller. Ewert previously appeared on the cover of Pansy Division's 1994 album Deflowered and both men subsequently appeared twenty years later on the cover of their 2016 album Quite Contrary, photographed in the same location.

The cassette release of this album is unique compared to other Lookout! Records albums in that it comes in a clear purple shell.

== Critical reception ==
Wish I'd Taken Pictures was generally well received by fans and critics alike. AllMusic noted that "it's got more of a strong punk kick than Deflowered, helped in part by Dustin Donaldson's turn on the drum kit and tighter riffs from Jon Ginoli and Chris Freeman."

== Track listing ==
No.	Title	Writer(s)	Length
1.	"Horny in the Morning"	Jon Ginoli	1:35
2.	"Vanilla"	Ginoli, Chris Freeman	2:08
3.	"I Really Wanted You"	Ginoli	2:15
4.	"Dick of Death"	Freeman	2:40
5.	"Expiration Date"	Ginoli	2:58
6.	"The Summer You Let Your Hair Grow Out"	Ginoli, Freeman	2:11
7.	"Wish I'd Taken Pictures"	Ginoli, Freeman	2:43
8.	"Pillow Talk"	Ginoli	2:23
9.	"This Is Your Life"	Ginoli, Freeman	1:44
10.	"Don't Be So Sure"	Ginoli, Freeman	2:52
11.	"Kevin"	Ginoli	3:01
12.	"The Ache"	Ginoli	4:02
13.	"Pee Shy"	Ginoli, Freeman	2:22
14.	"Sidewalk Sale"	Ginoli	1:17
Total length:			34:16

== Personnel ==
Pansy Division

- Jon Ginoli – vocals, guitars
- Chris Freeman – vocals, basses, guitars
- Dustin Donaldson – drums, percussion

Additional musicians

- Kirk Heydt – cello
