= Stars Kill Rock =

Compilation album by Various Artists
- Released: 1993
- Genre: Alternative rock
- Label: Kill Rock Stars

Various Artists chronology
Kill Rock Stars (1991)	Stars Kill Rock (1993)	Rock Stars Kill (1994)

Professional ratings
Review scores
Source	Rating
Allmusic	3/5 stars

Stars Kill Rock is a 1993 compilation album released on the Kill Rock Stars label.

== Track listing ==
1. Tiger Trap - "Supreme Nothing"
2. godheadSilo - "Nutritious Treat"
3. Frumpies - "Fuck Kitty"
4. Jack Acid - "Cheap Tragedies"
5. Tribe 8 - "Speed Fortress"
6. Versus - "Another Face"
7. Slant 6 - "Nights X 9"
8. Karp - "Gauze"
9. Mary Lou Lord - "Camden Town Rain"
10. Huggy Bear - "Carnt Kiss"
11. Calamity Jane - "Come On"
12. Heroin - "Hasbeen"
13. Adickdid - "Hair"
14. Getaway Car - "Sony Radio"
15. CWA- "Only Straight Girls Wear Dresses"
16. Bumblescrump - "Whiteout"
17. Cheesecake - "Mother's Little Helper"
18. Pansy Division - "Bunnies"
19. Nikki McClure - "Omnivore"
