= Absurd Pop Song Romance =

Studio album by Pansy Division
- Released: September 8, 1998
- Recorded: March 1998
- Studio: Electrical Audio Recording in Chicago, Illinois
- Genre: Queercore, power pop, alternative rock
- Length: 51:55
- Label: Lookout! Records
- Producer: Pansy Division

Pansy Division chronology
More Lovin' From Our Oven (1997)	Absurd Pop Song Romance (1998)	Total Entertainment! (2003)

Professional ratings
Review scores
Source	Rating
AllMusic	3/5 stars

Absurd Pop Song Romance is the fourth studio album, sixth album overall, by American queercore band Pansy Division, released on September 8, 1998 by Lookout! Records.

Absurd Pop Song Romance saw a major stylistic shift from the punk rock and pop punk sounds of Pansy Division's first three albums, featuring more textured indie rock and alternative rock. This was the first Pansy Division album to feature four members following the addition of lead guitarist Patrick Goodwin.

Critical reception was generally positive. AllMusic gave the album a modest rating of 3 out of 5 stars, praising the maturity of the songwriting and Jon Ginoli's "earnest and humorous" lyricism, summarizing the album as "fun, honest, catchy, and energetic".

== Track listing ==
No.	Title	Writer(s)	Length
1.	"(untitled)"		0:18
2.	"February 17"	Chris Freeman	3:20
3.	"Sweet Insecurity"	Jon Ginoli, Pansy Division	4:02
4.	"It'll Never Be the Same"	Freeman, Pansy Division	3:30
5.	"Better Off Just Friends"	Ginoli, Freeman	3:50
6.	"Too Beautiful"	Ginoli, Patrick Goodwin	2:43
7.	"(untitled)"		0:42
8.	"Luv Luv Luv"	Ginoli	2:34
9.	"(untitled)"		0:22
10.	"The Best Revenge"	Ginoli, Pansy Division	5:09
11.	"Bad Boyfriend"	Ginoli, Freeman	2:28
12.	"(untitled)"		0:53
13.	"You're Gonna Need Your Friends"	Freeman	3:16
14.	"Tinted Windows"	Ginoli	2:02
15.	"(untitled)"		0:57
16.	"Glenview"	Ginoli	3:19
17.	"Used to Turn Me On"	Freeman, Ginoli	4:58
18.	"Obstacle Course"	Ginoli	3:04
19.	"Vicious Beauty"	Ginoli, Pansy Division	4:28
Total length:			51:55

== Personnel ==
Pansy Division

- Jon Ginoli – vocals, guitar
- Chris Freeman – vocals, bass, keyboards on tracks 6, 7 and 13, drums on track 8
- Patrick Goodwin – lead guitar
- Luis Illades – drums, bass on track 8

Additional musicians

- Miriam Sturm – violin on track 16
- Edgar Gabriel – violin on track 16
- Bill Kronenberg – viola on track 16
- Sara Wollan – cello on track 16
- Kirk Garrison – trumpet on track 11
- Bob Frankich – saxophone on track 11

Production

- Recorded and mixed by Steve Albini
