= That's So Gay =

Studio album by Pansy Division
- Released: March 31, 2009
- Recorded: April 2007–September 2008
- Studios: Nu Tone, Pittsburg, California
- Genres: Queercore, power pop, alternative rock
- Length: 37:56
- Label: Alternative Tentacles

Pansy Division chronology
The Essential Pansy Division (2006)	That's So Gay (2009)	Quite Contrary (2016)

That's So Gay is an album by the American queercore band Pansy Division. It was released on March 31, 2009, by Alternative Tentacles.

== Critical reception ==
Professional ratings
Review scores
Source	Rating
AllMusic	3/5 stars
PopMatters	6/10

Exclaim! called the album "the band's most natural commingling of music and message yet ... Equal amounts of attention are paid to crafting sultry, unforgettable tunes as cramming double entendres into every line." Magnet wrote that it "retains the group’s signature melodic songs and humorous, homo-tawdry lyrics." Tucson Weekly wrote that "the joke is obvious but doesn't ever get old, because underneath the cartoonish simplicity, the music is actually, well, fun as hell." The Advocate wrote: "With a sense of humor as sharp-witted as ever, the seminal S.F. queercore combo is still on top of their game, taking on heteronormative hypocrisy in their triumphant return after a six-year hiatus."

== Track listing ==
No.	Title	Writer(s)	Length
1.	"Twinkie Twinkie Little Star"	Jon Ginoli	2:15
2.	"Average Men"	Ginoli	3:24
3.	"Ride Baby"	Chris Freeman	3:24
4.	"Some of My Best Friends"	Joel Reader	3:40
5.	"That's So Gay"	Freeman	2:28
6.	"Obsessed with Me"	Ginoli	1:57
7.	"20 Years of Cock"	Ginoli	1:39
8.	"What's in It for Me?"	lyrics: Freeman/Ginoli, music: Freeman	3:25
9.	"You'll See Them Again"	Ginoli	2:30
10.	"Dirty Young Man"	Ginoli	2:42
11.	"It's Just a Job"	lyrics: Freeman/Ginoli/Reader, music: Freeman	3:12
12.	"Pat Me on the Ass"	Ginoli	1:45
13.	"Never You Mind"	Freeman	2:32
14.	"Life Lovers"	Ginoli	3:03
Total length:			37:56

== Personnel ==
- Luis Illades – drums, percussion, keyboards on track 13
- Jon Ginoli – guitars, vocals
- Joel Reader – lead guitars, vocals
- Chris Freeman – bass guitars, vocals, keyboards on tracks 8 and 10
- Jello Biafra - guest vocals on track 2
