= Undressed (Pansy Division album) =

Studio album by Pansy Division
- Released: 1993
- Recorded: July 1991 – August 1992
- Genre: Queercore, punk
- Length: 32:59
- Label: Lookout!
- Producer: Pansy Division

Pansy Division chronology
Undressed (1993)	Deflowered (1994)

Undressed is the debut album by American queercore band Pansy Division, released in 1993 on Lookout! Records.

Singer-songwriter Jon Ginoli had previously released Undressed independently on cassette tape in 1991, featuring a different line-up with bassist Chris Bowe which was recorded in Champaign, Illinois. Nine of the tracks from these sessions were included on the Lookout! release of the album.

== Critical reception ==
Professional ratings
Review scores
Source	Rating
AllMusic	4.5/5 stars
Robert Christgau	(1-star Honorable Mention)

Undressed received positive reviews from the independent music press. Trouser Press noted that "the horny band's genially explicit lyrics ... cut right to the chase." In a brief capsule review, AllMusic wrote that "these sex punks tunefully and loudly wag their penises and preferences about" and praised the "Byrds-influenced" "Boyfriend Wanted".

== Track listing ==
All songs written by Jon Ginoli, except where noted.

1. "Versatile" – 3:01
2. "Fem in a Black Leather Jacket" – 2:04
3. "Bunnies" – 2:03
4. "Boyfriend Wanted" – 2:52
5. "The Story So Far" – 2:47
6. "Hippy Dude" – 3:02
7. "Curvature" – 2:17
8. "The Cocksucker Club" – 2:20
9. "Crabby Day" – 2:46
10. "Luck of the Draw" – 2:25
11. "Rock & Roll Queer Bar" (Ginoli/Ramones) – 1:40
12. "Surrender Your Clothing" – 3:59
13. "Anthem" – 2:24

== Personnel ==
Pansy Division

- Jon Ginoli – vocals, guitars
- Chris Freeman – bass, backing vocals
- Patrick Hawley – drums

Additional musicians

- Sally Schlosstein – drums on tracks 4 and 7
- Chris Bowe – bass on tracks 1, 3, 5, 6, 8–11, 13
- Kent Whitesell – lead guitar on tracks 1, 5, 6, 13, percussion on track 9
