= Pile Up =

Compilation album by Pansy Division
- Released: February 16, 1995
- Recorded: 1992–1995
- Genre: Queercore, punk rock, pop-punk, power pop
- Length: 48:16
- Label: Lookout!

Pansy Division chronology
Deflowered (1994)	Pile Up (1995)	Wish I'd Taken Pictures (1996)

Pile Up is a compilation album by American queercore band Pansy Division, released on February 16, 1995, by Lookout! Records. The album compiles various singles, b-sides, cover songs and compilation appearances recorded between 1992 and 1995.

AllMusic gave the album a rating of 3 out of 5 stars, praising it as "some of the best of the Pansies, with a slew of covers and their best harmonies and tightest playing to date", though noted the "danger of becoming a one-joke band".

== Track listing ==
No.	Title	Writer(s)	Length
1.	"I Can't Sleep"	Jon Ginoli	1:31
2.	"Ring of Joy"	Ginoli	3:04
3.	"Fuck Buddy"	Ginoli	2:28
4.	"Cowboys are Frequently, Secretly Fond of Each Other"	Ned Sublette	3:29
5.	"Flower"	Liz Phair	1:44
6.	"Cry for a Shadow"	Beat Happening	2:36
7.	"Real Men"	Ginoli, Joe Jackson	1:30
8.	"Bill & Ted's Homosexual Adventure"	Ginoli	3:05
9.	"Jack U Off"	Prince	2:32
10.	"Strip U Down"	Ginoli	3:19
11.	"Jackson"	Gaby Rodgers, Billy Wheeler	2:49
12.	"Big Bottom"	Christopher Guest, Michael McKean, Harry Shearer, Rob Reiner	2:04
13.	"Touch My Joe Camel"	Ginoli, Chris Freeman	2:53
14.	"The Biggest Lie"	Bob Mould	1:42
15.	"Denny (Naked)"	Ginoli, Trebor Healey	2:31
16.	"Femme Fatale"	Lou Reed	2:20
17.	"Trash"	Bryan Ferry, Phil Manzanera	2:07
18.	"Homo Christmas"	Ginoli	2:30
19.	"C.S.F."	Rado, Ragni, McDermott, Ginoli, Doug Mobley	1:07
20.	"Smells Like Queer Spirit"	Ginoli, Nirvana	4:17
Total length:			48:16

Previous availability

- Track 1 appeared on the Outpunk Dance Party CD compilation (1994)
- Track 2 appeared on the A Slice of Lemon CD compilation (1995)
- Tracks 3, 6 and 12 were from the Nine Inch Males E.P. 7-inch (1993)
- Track 4 appeared on the "Stop Homophobia" split 7-inch (1994)
- Tracks 8 and 12 comprise the "Bill & Ted's Homosexual Adventure" 7-inch (1993)
- Tracks 9 and 10 comprise the "Jack U Off" 7-inch (1994)
- Track 11 was the A-side of the "Jackson" 7-inch (1994)
- Tracks 13 and 17 are from the "Touch My Joe Camel" 7-inch (1993)
- Tracks 18 and 20 were B-sides on the "Fem in a Black Leather Jacket" 7-inch (1992)

== Personnel ==
Pansy Division

- Jon Ginoli – vocals, guitars
- Chris Freeman – vocals, basses, lead guitars on tracks 12 and 14

Additional musicians

- Calvin Johnson – vocals on track 11
- Chris Bowe – bass on track 16
- Liam Hart – drums on tracks 1, 2, 5, 7, 9–11
- Patrick Hawley – drums on tracks 8, 12, 16–18, 20
- David Ayer – drums on tracks 3, 4, 6, 14
- David Ward – drums on tracks 13, 19
