= Scott Treleaven =

Canadian film director (born 1972)

- Born: 1972 (age 53–54)
- Education: Etobicoke School of the Arts; OCAD University
- Occupations: Artist; filmmaker

Scott Treleaven is a Canadian artist whose work employs a variety of media including painting, collage, film, video, drawing, photography and installation.

== Artwork ==
Artform Magazine invoked references to Jean Genet, William S. Burroughs, Jack Pierson and Nan Goldin, in describing Treleaven's place in "a lineage of obdurate misfits". He attended the Etobicoke School of the Arts and OCAD University. Treleaven has exhibited in a number of institutions throughout the world including Cooper Cole, Toronto; XYZ Collective, Tokyo; MOCA Tucson, Arizona; Invisible-Exports, New York; The Suburban, Milwaukee; 80WSE, New York; ICA, Philadelphia; Palais de Tokyo, Paris; ICA London, UK; La Biennale de Montréal; and John Connelly Presents, New York. In 2014 Treleaven's drawings were included in the final segment of 'Outside the Lines' at the Contemporary Arts Museum Houston, a major survey of contemporary abstraction.

== Films ==
Treleaven's first film Queercore: A Punk-u-mentary was produced in 1996, a documentary on the queercore scene in the 1990s.

In 2002 Treleaven presented an overview of his independent publishing experiences in a film entitled The Salivation Army which has been screened at MOMA and Art Basel, Switzerland.

In 2005 photographer/director Carter Smith approached Treleaven about adapting his published horror story, Bugcrush, into Smith's Sundance Film Festival award-winning short film. Director Steven Spielberg has openly lauded the film.

In 2008, he appeared in the feature film, The Lollipop Generation by G.B. Jones, alongside Jena von Brücker, Mark Ewert, Vaginal Davis, Calvin Johnson and Joel Gibb.

In March 2011, The Museum of Modern Art in New York (MOMA) featured a program of Treleaven's films as part of the Queer Cinema from the Collection: Today and Yesterday program, curated by artist AA Bronson and Joshua Siegel, Associate Curator, Department of Film, at The Museum of Modern Art.

== Publications and zines ==
Concurrent with the documentary Queercore: A Punk-u-mentary, Treleaven created an illustrated zine project called This Is The Salivation Army (1996–1999): a mix of punk, goth, occult, and industrial music aesthetics, alongside homages to iconoclasts like William S. Burroughs, Brion Gysin, William Blake, and Derek Jarman. The zine was a seeding ground for a variety of concepts and styles that would continue to appear in Treleaven's visual art. Books, zines and independently produced publications continue to be a recurring motif throughout his work.

In 2006 a book marking the 10th anniversary of the This Is The Salivation Army project was published by Printed Matter (NY) and Art Metropole (Toronto), containing an entire reprint of the zines alongside more recent drawings and collages.

Treleaven's contribution to artist publications has been acknowledged in the books, In Numbers: Serial Publications by Artists Since 1955 (JRP|Ringier 2009), The Magazine – Documents of Contemporary Art Series (MIT Press 2015) and Showboat: Punk, Sex, Bodies (Dashwood 2016).

== Filmography ==
- Last 7 Words (2009), actors: Genesis P-Orridge, soundtrack by Locrian (Terence Hannum & André Foisy)
- Silver (2006), actors: AA Bronson, soundtrack by Andrew Zealley
- Gold (2006), actors: Genesis P-Orridge and Lady Jaye Breyer P-Orridge, soundtrack by Andrew Zealley
- Bugcrush (2006), original story. Written and directed by Carter Smith
- The Salivation Army (2002), actors: Kevin Drew
- Beastboy (2002), actor: Andrew Cecil
- He Is the Boss Of Me (2001), video for The Hidden Cameras
- Queercore: A punk-u-mentary (1996)

== Bibliography ==
- The Age of Collage Vol. 3: Contemporary Collage in Modern Art, gestalten, Berlin, 2020
- Showboat: Punk / Sex / Bodies, Dashwood Books, New York, 2016
- The Two Eyes Are Not Brothers, by Scott Treleaven, published by Kiddiepunk, Paris, 2011
- Passing Strange, by Scott Treleaven, published by Viafarini, Milan, 2009
- Collage: Assembling Contemporary Art, Black Dog Publishing, 2008, ISBN 978-1-906155-39-1
- Queer Zines, Printed Matter Inc., 2008, ISBN 978-0-89439-039-5
- Grey Book (catalogue), by Scott Treleaven, published by The Breeder gallery, Athens, 2008
- Some Boys Wander By Mistake (catalogue), by Scott Treleaven, with texts by Dennis Cooper, Terence Hannum, and Jack Pierson, co-published by Kavi Gupta Gallery, John Connelly Presents & Marc Selwyn Fine Art, 2007, ISBN 978-1-4243-4215-0
- Juicy Mother: How They Met, edited by Jennifer Camper, Manic D Press, 2007, ISBN 978-1-933149-20-2
- An Emerald Tablet, by Scott Treleaven, Friends of the High Line, NY, 2007
- The Salivation Army Black Book, by Scott Treleaven, Printed Matter Inc./Art Metropole, 2006, ISBN 978-0-89439-021-0
- Generation Hex (The Disinformation Company book)|Generation Hex, edited by Jason Louv, The Disinformation Company, 2005, ISBN 978-1-932857-20-7
- Queer Fear II, Michael Rowe, editor, Arsenal Pulp Press, 2002, ISBN 978-1-55152-122-0 (horror fiction collection featuring Treleaven's infamous short story 'Bugcrush')
- We want some too: Underground desire and the reinvention of mass culture, by Hal Niedzviecki, Penguin Putnam, 2000, ISBN 978-0-14-029172-8
- This Is The Salivation Army, issues 1–8, by Scott Treleaven, 1996 to 1999
- This Is The Salivation Army, issue 10, by Scott Treleaven, Art Gallery of York University, 2004 ('The Salivation Army' film is considered issue #9; issue 10 was an addition to This Is the Salivation Army zines in name only and not considered part of the original run)
