= More Lovin' from Our Oven =

Compilation album by Pansy Division
- Released: August 12, 1997
- Genre: Queercore, punk rock
- Label: Lookout!

Pansy Division chronology
Wish I'd Taken Pictures (1996)	More Lovin' from Our Oven (1997)	Absurd Pop Song Romance (1998)

Professional ratings
Review scores
Source	Rating
AllMusic	4/5 stars

More Lovin' from Our Oven is a compilation of singles, unreleased tracks, demos and other rare songs by queercore band Pansy Division.

== Track listing ==
1. "I'm Gonna Be a Slut" (Chris Freeman, Jon Ginoli)
2. "Manada" (Ginoli)
3. "Pretty Boy (What's Your Name?)" (Vince Clarke)
4. "Hockey Hair" (Ginoli)
5. "Headbanger" (Freeman, Ginoli)
6. "Breaking the Law" (Rob Halford, Glenn Tipton, K.K. Downing)
7. "Political Asshole" (Freeman, Ginoli)
8. "Male Model" (JJ O'Neill)
9. "Valentine's Day" (Ginoli)
10. "Expiration Date 01/97" (Freeman, Ginoli)
11. "The Summer You Let Your Hair Grow Out" (Acoustic) (Ginoli, Freeman)
12. "He Could Be the One" (Bobby Paine, Larson Paine)
13. "On Any Other Day" (Stewart Copeland)
14. "Negative Queen (Stripped Bare)" (Ginoli)
15. "Sweet Pain" (Gene Simmons)
16. "One Night Stand" (Maow)
17. "Two Way Ass" (Freeman, Ginoli)
18. "Bunnies" (Live) (Ginoli)
19. "Manada" (Version Quebecois) (Ginoli)
20. "Fem in a Black Leather Jacket" (Demo) (Ginoli)
21. "Story So Far" (Demo) (Ginoli)
