= Pansy Division =

American punk band

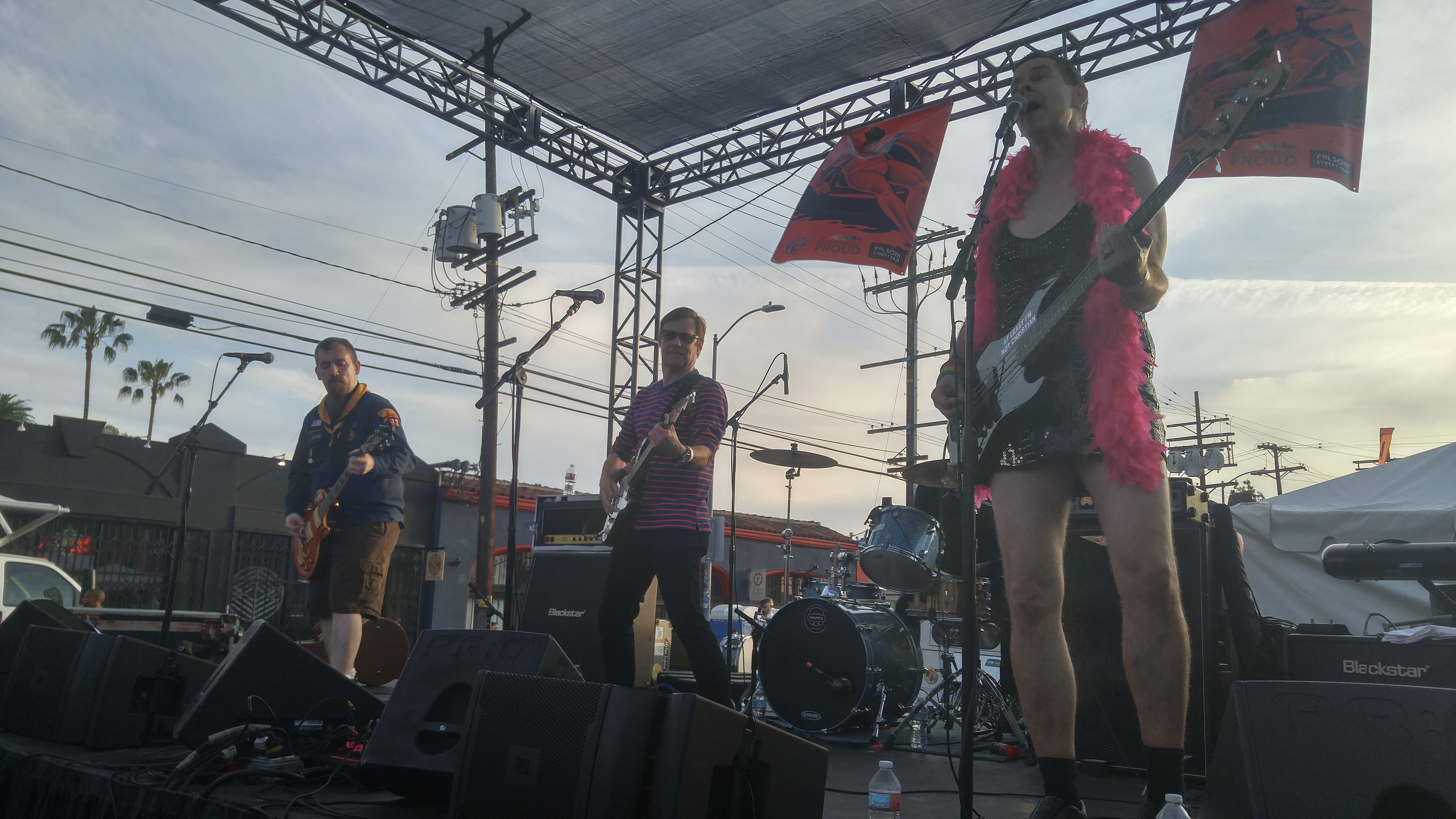
- Pansy Division performing in 2016

Background information
- Origin: San Francisco, California, U.S.
- Genres: Pop-punk; power pop; queercore
- Years active: 1991–present
- Labels: Outpunk; Alternative Tentacles; Mint; Lookout
- Members: Jon Ginoli; Chris Freeman; Luis Illades; Joel Reader
- Past members: Patrick Hawley; Jay Paget; David Ward; David Ayer; Lliam Hart; Dan Panic; Dustin Donaldson; Patrick Goodwin; Bernard Yin
- Website: www.pansydivision.com

Pansy Division is an American queercore band formed in San Francisco, California, in 1991 by guitarist/singer/songwriter Jon Ginoli along with bassist Chris Freeman.

Conceived as the first openly gay rock band featuring predominantly gay musicians, Pansy Division's music, a mix of pop-punk and power pop, focuses mainly on LGBT issues, sex and relationships, often presented in a humorous light. In 1992, the band signed to punk label Lookout! Records and received international notoriety touring with Green Day in 1994, becoming the most commercially successful band of the queercore movement which began in the 1980s.

Pansy Division has released seven studio albums and three B-side compilations, among other recordings. In 2008, the band was the subject of a documentary film entitled Pansy Division: Life in a Gay Rock Band.

== History ==
=== Formation ===
Frustrated by the lack of openly gay rock musicians, Jon Ginoli started performing solo sets under the moniker Pansy Division (a pun on Panzer division and a commonly used anti-gay slur "pansy") around San Francisco. Shortly after this, in 1991, Ginoli placed an ad in the San Francisco Weekly looking for "gay musicians into the Ramones, Buzzcocks and early Beatles". This caught the attention of Chris Freeman, who joined the band as a bassist. Ginoli and Freeman then recruited drummer Jay Paget, forming the first entirely out gay rock band that any of them had known. They hoped to defy the stereotype that gay men preferred pop divas and showtunes, by playing punk rock music.

=== Lookout! years (1993–2000) ===
Following extensive touring in California, several 7" singles and compilation appearances, Pansy Division signed to Lookout! Records, released their first album, Undressed in March 1993. They then embarked on their first national tour.

In 1994, with the release of their second album Deflowered and an appearance on Outpunk's seminal compilation Outpunk Dance Party, the band had proven themselves to be one of the more prolific and well-known artists to spring from the budding queercore movement. Catching the wave of pop-punk's mainstream explosion, Pansy Division were asked to tour with Green Day on the band's 1994 Dookie tour, introducing the group and queercore to a larger audience. During the tour's New York stop, the band caught the attention of Howard Stern, who met them backstage and spent a segment talking about them on his nationally syndicated radio show.

While signed to Lookout!, the band continued to release an album every year. In 1995, Pansy Division released the album Pile Up notable for its various cover songs, included Ned Sublette's "Cowboys Are Frequently, Secretly Fond of Each Other" and Nirvana's "Smells Like Teen Spirit" (covered as "Smells Like Queer Spirit"). During their tour of eastern Canada in 1995, the band took a set of underwear shots in an old hotel, and produced a set of Pansy Division trading cards that were used as promotional materials for the next album. In 1996, the album Wish I'd Taken Pictures featured the single "I Really Wanted You". The music video for this single aired once on MTV. In 1997, the album More Lovin' From Our Oven collected a large number of B-sides that the band had already released as singles.

During this period, Pansy Division primarily performed as a trio, with Freeman and Ginoli being the only constant members amid a slew of perpetually rotating drummers, both gay and straight. In 1996, the band finally found a permanent gay drummer in the form of Luis Illades. In 1997, the band became a quartet with the addition of lead guitarist Patrick Goodwin.

1998 saw the release of Pansy Division's fifth studio album Absurd Pop Song Romance, a departure from earlier Pansy work that featured less humorous, more introspective lyrics and a darker, two-guitar layered alternative rock sound. The band was again taken on tour by a mainstream punk band, when they opened for Rancid on their 1998 Life Won't Wait tour.

=== Alternative Tentacles years (2001–present) ===
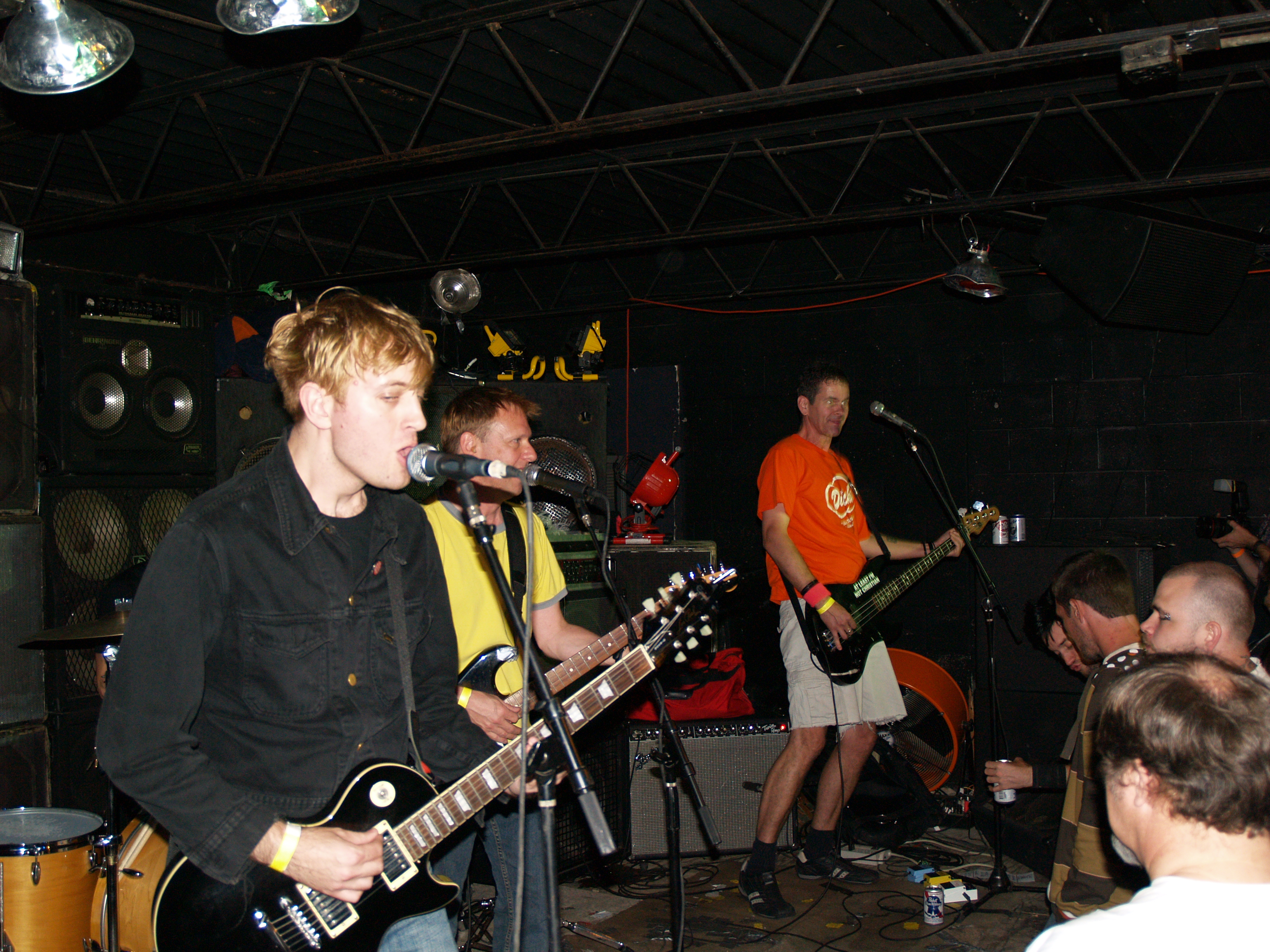
Pansy Division performing in 2007

In 2001, Pansy Division was finally ready to record another album, but the lack of support from Lookout! caused the band to leave their long-time label and sign with Alternative Tentacles later that year. What resulted was 2003's Total Entertainment!, an album that the band described as a meeting point between the lighthearted humor of their early work and the introspective rock of their previous album. Goodwin left the band the following year, being temporarily replaced by Bernard Yin and then by former Mr. T Experience member Joel Reader.

Following the release of Total Entertainment, Pansy Division's active touring and recording schedule declined as most of the members relocated to different parts of the country. The band continued to perform sporadically, usually at various gay pride festivals or local shows in San Francisco. In 2006, Alternative Tentacles released The Essential Pansy Division, a comprehensive 'best-of' compilation featuring thirty tracks picked by Ginoli and a DVD of various video footage. This compilation was motivated by the longer period of inactivity, and the idea that Pansy Division might be over.

However, in 2007, Pansy Division launched their first national tour since 2003 with reformed San Francisco punk band the Avengers, whose line-up featured both Illades and Reader. Then, in 2008, the band became the subject of a documentary film entitled Pansy Division: Life in a Gay Rock Band, directed by Michael Carmona. The film toured internationally, playing at various LGBT film festivals; it was released on DVD in 2009 and later also on YouTube.

2009 also saw the release of Pansy Division's seventh studio album, titled That's So Gay, a live DVD, another national tour, and Ginoli's memoirs, a biography of the band entitled Deflowered: My Life in Pansy Division. The album was put together largely remotely, as band members worked from different cities.

After a seven-year break from recording, Pansy Division returned in 2016 with Quite Contrary. This album includes a holiday song about being single on New Year's Eve "Kiss Me at Midnight (New Year's Eve)"; a song about internet dating "Too Much to Ask"; as well as a poignant break-up song "Something Beautiful". Jon has performed "Kiss Me at Midnight (New Year's Eve)" solo, since the band members live in different cities. The single released with this album is "Blame the Bible" (A-side) / "Neighbors of the Beast" (B-side). A music video was also produced for the song "Blame the Bible".

In 2017, Pansy Division was included in the documentary film Queercore: How to Punk a Revolution directed by Yony Leyser.

In November 2022, Pansy Division released a video for the 30th anniversary of their first single, "Fem in a Black Leather Jacket"; that video is available on their YouTube channel. In March 2023, they also released a series of three interviews for the 30th anniversary of the release of their first album Undressed. Those interviews featured discussions with the cover model Alex Fazekas-Paul, recording engineer Kent Whitesell, and Lookout! Records' Larry Livermore. In the summer of 2023 they also have planned a short US tour for the anniversary.

In interviews, Ginoli has said that he plans to release a solo album eventually. Chris Freeman has recently been touring with the AC/DC cover band GayC/DC. In July 2022, Pansy Division played the Mosswood Meltdown, a large outdoor music festival in Oakland, California. As of May 2023, Pansy Division has played 976 shows. Pansy Division continues to play shows in 2023 as they inch toward their goal of having played 1,000 shows. The band has begun reissuing remastered versions of their first three albums on colored vinyl, beginning with 'Undressed' in 2024.

== Members ==
Current members

- Jon Ginoli – vocals, guitar (1991–present)
- Chris Freeman – bass, vocals (1991–present)
- Joel Reader – lead guitar, vocals (2004–present; also of the Avengers, formerly of the Mr. T Experience and The Plus Ones)
- Luis Illades – drums (1996–present; also of The Avengers)

Former members

- Patrick Goodwin – lead guitar (1997–2004; currently of Dirty Power, formerly of Hammers of Misfortune)
- Bernard Yin – lead guitar (2004; currently of Astra Heights)
- Jay Paget – drums (1991–1992; formerly of Thinking Fellers Union Local 282)
- David Ward – drums (1992, 1994)
- Lliam Hart – drums (1994)
- David Ayer – drums (1994)
- Dan Panic – drums (1994; then of Screeching Weasel)
- Patrick Hawley – drums (1991, 1995)
- Dustin Donaldson – drums (1995–1996; formerly of Thought Industry, currently of I Am Spoonbender)

Timeline

== Discography ==
Studio albums

- Undressed (1993)
- Deflowered (1994)
- Wish I'd Taken Pictures (1996)
- Absurd Pop Song Romance (1998)
- Total Entertainment! (2003)
- That's So Gay (2009)
- Quite Contrary (2016)

== Literature ==
- Jon Ginoli. Deflowered: My Life in Pansy Division. Cleis Press, 2009. ISBN 1-57344-343-3.
- Philipp Meinert. Homopunk History: Von den Sechzigern bis in die Gegenwart. (in German) Ventil Verlag, 2018. ISBN 978-3-95575-094-7.
- Liam Warfield, Walter Crasshole, Yony Leyser (eds). Queercore: How to Punk a Revolution: An Oral History. PM Press, 2021. ISBN 1-62963-796-3.
