= Jon Ginoli =

American guitarist (born 1959)

- Born: Jon Latimer Ginoli; December 4, 1959 (age 66); Peoria, Illinois, U.S.
- Instruments: Guitar, vocals
- Years active: 1982–present
- Member of: Pansy Division
- Formerly of: The Outnumbered

Jon Latimer Ginoli (born December 4, 1959, in Peoria, Illinois) is an American guitarist and singer-songwriter. He is best known as a member of Pansy Division.

== Early life ==
Ginoli "lived a normal life in a normal place with a normal family with two parents and a younger sister." In 1965 at the age of five, he developed an interest in music by listening to Chicago radio stations. He attended Richwoods High School which he graduated from in 1978. In 1977 he created his own rock and roll fanzine, Hoopla.

== Career ==
=== The Outnumbered ===
Ginoli was a singer, songwriter and guitarist for an indie band called The Outnumbered, which he formed while an undergraduate at the University of Illinois at Urbana-Champaign. The Outnumbered released three studio albums and a compilation album; two of these albums were released on the label Homestead Records. While in college, Ginoli served as a DJ at Urbana radio station WPGU.

=== Pansy Division ===
Ginoli moved from Illinois to California in the late 80s. He founded queercore band Pansy Division in 1991 out of frustration with the lack of openly gay musicians in rock music at the time. He quickly recruited bassist Chris Freeman through an ad Ginoli had placed in SF Weekly looking for "gay musicians into the Ramones, Buzzcocks and early Beatles". The band went through many different drummers before settling on Luis Illades in late 1996. The band has released seven studio albums, first on Lookout! Records and later on Alternative Tentacles.

== Personal life ==
Ginoli is gay. Jon moved to Palm Springs, California from San Francisco in 2022.

== Other Work ==
Along with Pansy Division, Ginoli was featured in the 1997 documentary film Queercore: A Punk-U-Mentary by Scott Treleaven; as an actor, in the 2002 comedy short Going West by Michael Mew; in the 2008 film Pansy Division: Life in a Gay Rock Band by Michael Carmona; and in the 2017 documentary film Queercore: How to Punk a Revolution directed by Yony Leyser.

He authored the memoir Deflowered: My Life in Pansy Division, published in 2009.
