= Leslie Mah =

American musician and performer (born 1964)

- Born: April 20, 1964 (age 62)
- Origin: Boulder, Colorado
- Genres: Hardcore punk
- Occupations: Musician, songwriter, tattoo artist
- Instrument: guitar
- Label: Alternative Tentacles

Leslie Mah is an American musician and performer.

== Biography ==
Mah first began performing with Anti-Scrunti Faction, a hardcore punk band based in Boulder, Colorado which she co-founded with Tracie Thomas. The group first appeared on the Flipside fanzine compilation, Flipside Vinyl Fanzine Vol.1 in 1984 and, in 1985, released one single and an album, Damsels In Distress, on Flipside. The two lead performers and songwriters, Mah and Thomas, were part of the formation of the early Queercore movement, appearing in the seminal zine J.D.s, and starred and performed in The Yo-Yo Gang by G.B. Jones, released in 1992.

In 1988, Mah moved to San Francisco and helped found another of the pioneering queercore punk bands, Tribe 8, for which she played guitar. The group released their first single on Harp Records, following up with EPS on fledgling queercore label Outpunk and were later signed to the independent record label Alternative Tentacles, releasing a number of singles and albums in the years they were together. As a band, they first appeared on film in A Gun for Jennifer; performed in She's Real, Worse Than Queer, which featured interviews with Mah, Lynn Breedlove and other members of the band; and were the subjects of the documentary Rise Above: A Tribe 8 Documentary by Tracy Flannigan, which played at film festivals around the world and won several awards including 'Best Documentary'.

Mah has also appeared in other independent films such as Shut Up White Boy by Vu T. Thu Ha, and directed her own film called Estrofemme. She has also performed with groups such as Grannies and Trannies at the music festival Homo-A-GoGo.

Mah began working as a professional tattoo artist in 1995 in San Francisco. She is a founder of the Diving Swallow Tattoo collective in Oakland, California.

== Filmography ==
- The Yo-Yo Gang by G.B. Jones, 1992
- A Gun For Jennifer, 1996
- She's Real, Worse Than Queer by Lucy Thane, 1997
- Shut Up White Boy by [Vũ T. Thu Hà]
- Estrofemme by Leslie Mah, 1998
- Rise Above: A Tribe 8 Documentary by Tracy Flannigan, 2003
- FtF: Female to Femme, directed by Kami Chisholm and Elizabeth Stark, 2006
- Hot Chick Hot Rod Stoner BBQ by Tina Gordon, 2006
- Godspeed by Lynn Breedlove and Jen Gilomen, 2007

== Publications ==
- Dragon Ladies: Asian American Feminists Breathe Fire, edited by Sonia Shah, South End Press, 1997 ISBN 0-89608-575-9
