= Tom Jennings =

American artist, computer specialist (born 1955)

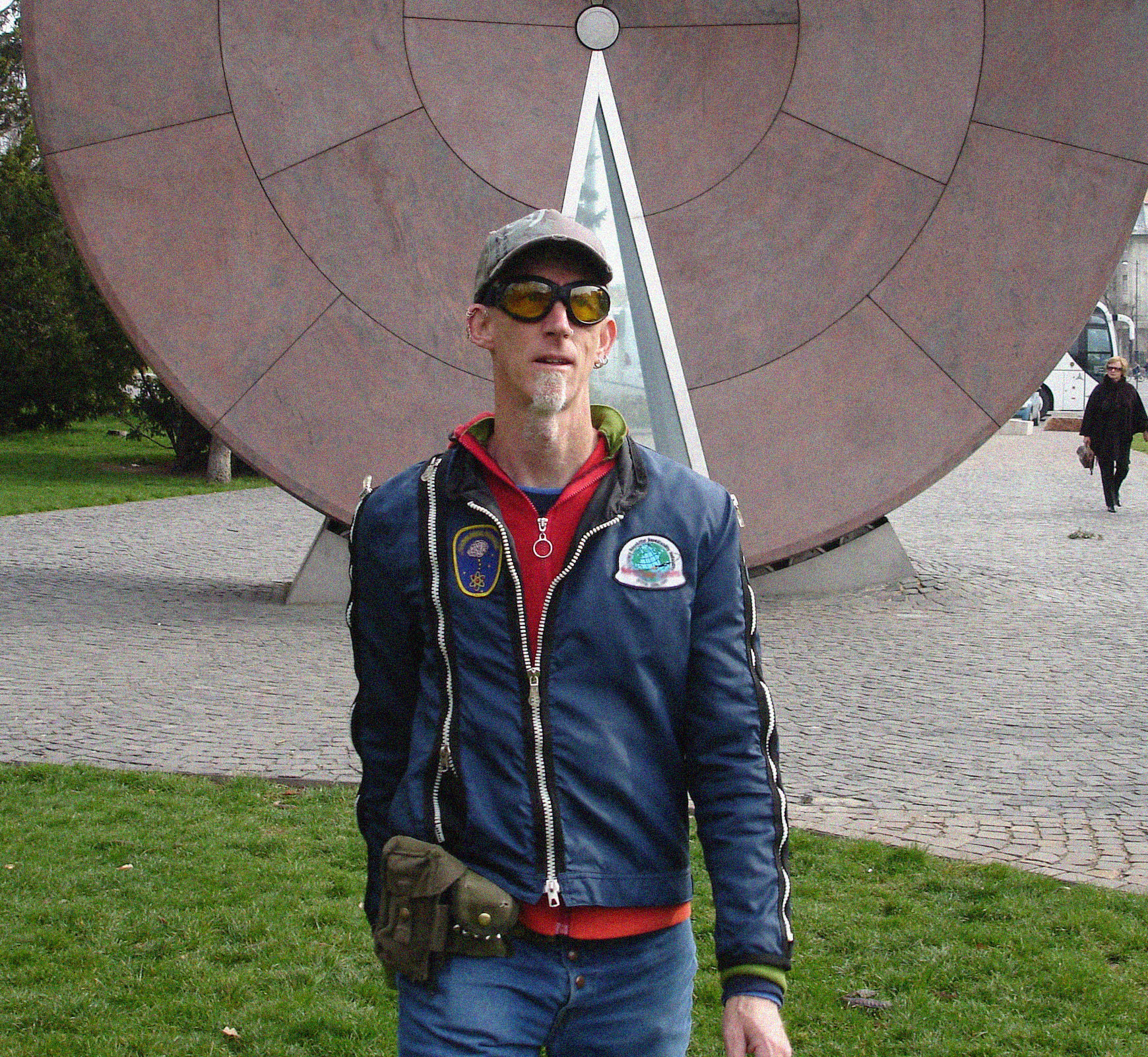
- Tom Jennings (Budapest, 2013)
- Born: Thomas Daniel Jennings; 1955 (age 70–71); Boston, Massachusetts, U.S.
- Occupation: artist
- Website: www.sensitiveresearch.com

Thomas Daniel Jennings (born 1955) is a Los Angeles-based artist and computer programmer, known for his work that led to FidoNet (the first message and file networking bulletin board system, or BBS), and for his work at Phoenix Software on MS-DOS integration and interoperability.

== Work ==
In 1983, Jennings created the Fido program, which spawned FidoNet, the first message and file networking bulletin board system (BBS). The FidoNet protocols were authored by Jennings in the Fido program, and they were ultimately implemented by numerous authors in other software to create the full BBS, network using a multiplicity of platforms.

Aside from creating the protocol for networking BBSes, Jennings wrote the portable BIOS that led to Phoenix Technologies BIOS, contributing to on MS-DOS integration and interoperability; ran an early regional internet service provider – The Little Garden (later incorporated as TLGnet, Inc).

From 1988 until 1991, while he lived in San Francisco, Jennings was the publisher and co-editor, with Deke Nihilson, of Homocore, one of the earliest Queercore zines. The name came from the pages of J.D.s zine, and featured musicians and writers such as The Apostles, Steve Abbott, Donna Dresch, Larry Livermore, Daniel Nicoletta and G. B. Jones. The co-editors' other activities, such as organizing Homocore shows where bands such as Fugazi and Beat Happening appeared, and writing for and creating other publications, helped popularize the Queercore movement in the United states and internationally.

== Popular culture ==
In 2002, Jennings was interviewed for the series BBS: The Documentary, released online (partial content) and to home video in DVD format (full content) in 2005.

== Personal life ==
In a 1996 Wired article he was described as a "homo punk activist" and "anarchist". In a 1993 issue of FringeWare Review interview, he described himself as "a fag anarcho nerd troublemaker/activist".
