= Deke Nihilson =

American journalist (born 1968)

Daniel "Deke" Frontino Elash (born January 2, 1968) is an American zine editor, musician, actor, activist and historian.

In 1988, Nihilson and Tom Jennings met at the Anarchist Survival Gathering in Toronto. Shortly thereafter they began publishing Homocore zine out of San Francisco. One of the earliest queercore zines, it followed in the wake of J.D.s and was instrumental in the expansion of the queer punk scene. The newspaper-style zine not only covered and influenced Bay Area and West Coast punks, it had an international readership. The name "Homocore" came from the pages of J.D.s and from 1988 to 1991, seven issues were produced. Contributors included musicians and writers such as The Apostles, Steve Abbott, Donna Dresch, Larry Livermore, Daniel Nicoletta, and G. B. Jones. At the same time, Nihilson and Jennings set up Homocore shows where bands such as Fugazi, Beat Happening and MDC played, and did much to popularize the queercore scene on the west coast of the U.S. Nihilson began his own band around this time, called Comrades In Arms. One of the earliest queercore bands, they played at Homocore events and issued one cassette release.

Nihilson appears in the film The Yo-Yo Gang by G.B. Jones, released in 1992. He also appeared in the 1991 short film Shred Of Sex directed by Greta Snider; the scene in which Nihilson masturbates alone on screen achieved cult status on the independent film circuit.

Nihilson was also involved with the Industrial Workers of the World (IWW). On 1 September 1992, Nihilson and other IWW members called a press conference for four workers who had been fired from the gay bar "End Up". They had joined the IWW in the midst of ongoing labor disputes with the bar, prior to their dismissal. During the conference, Nihilson burned the rainbow flag, a gesture designed to refute the supposed unity the flag symbolizes for the gay community, due to class divisions. The event was featured in San Francisco media such as San Francisco Bay Times, Bay Guardian and Bay Area Reporter. In their zine Homocore, Nihilson and Jennings worked to confront the homophobia of the punk community as well as the morally compromised, consumerist ethos of the mainstream gay and lesbian community.

During the 1990s, Nihilson remained active in IWW as well as Food Not Bombs (FNB). As an organizer for IWW and FNB, he launched a campaign fighting gentrification in San Francisco in the 1990s. The campaign focused on action for the working class, serving a weekly meal for the homeless and protesting for affordable housing.

At present, Nihilson is a Marxist–Leninist filmmaker working in Portland, Oregon. The Deke Nihilson papers, including ephemera from the punk scene, queer music events, and workers' rights protests, are held by the GLBT Historical Society in San Francisco.
