= Fist City (Tribe 8 album) =

Studio album by Tribe 8
- Released: 1995
- Studio: House of Faith
- Genres: Punk rock, queercore
- Label: Alternative Tentacles
- Producer: Bart Thurber

Tribe 8 chronology
By the Time We Get to Colorado (1993)	Fist City (1995)	Roadkill Cafe (1995)

Fist City is the first studio album by the American queer punk band Tribe 8, released in 1995. The band supported the album with a North American tour.

== Production ==
Fist City contains a cover of Aretha Franklin's "Think". Shaunna Hall, of 4 Non Blondes, contributed guitar parts to the album.

== Critical reception ==
Professional ratings
Review scores
Source	Rating
Robert Christgau	(1-star Honorable Mention)

Trouser Press called the album "impressive," writing that "behind growly singer Lynn Breedlove, the group’s rock barrels along with as much intelligent raunch as the lyrics, a guitar-drenched punk charge that means business but stays well within safe musical boundaries." The Washington Post thought that "musically, these songs are not distinctive, but they are suitably vehement ... 'Neanderthal Dyke' admits, 'I never read Dworkin/I ride a big bike/Feminist theory gets me uptight'." The Chicago Tribune wrote: "With its buzz-saw twin-guitar assault and hammering rhythms, Tribe 8 works a ferocious hardcore edge."

The Advocate deemed the album a "sludgy blend of metal and thrash punk," but wrote that "the simple fact that its members are Asian, black, and white lesbians playing angry rock'n'roll makes the band revolutionary." The Boston Globe called the band "riotously non-PC." Miami New Times lamented that the album was "as predictable and witless as anything by W.A.S.P. and Motley Crue."

== Track listing ==
No.	Title	Length
1.	"Manipulate"
2.	"Seraphim"
3.	"Butch in the Streets"
4.	"Romeo and Julio"
5.	"What?"
6.	"Kick"
7.	"Neanderthal Dyke"
8.	"Freedom"
9.	"Allen's Mom"
10.	"Femme Bitch Top"
11.	"Think"
12.	"Flippersnapper"
13.	"Barnyard Poontang"
14.	"All I Can Do"
15.	"Frat Pig"

== Personnel ==
- Slade Bellum – drums
- Lynn Breedlove – vocals
- Silas Howard – guitar
- Leslie Mah – guitar
- Lynn Payne – bass
