= Fagatron =

American Queercore band

- Origin: Lincoln, Nebraska
- Genres: Queercore; hardcore
- Years active: 1996-1998, 2002-2003
- Label: Agitprop! Records
- Past members: Abe Miner; Jeromy Ogg

Fagatron was a short-lived but influential punk rock band in the Queercore movement which gained a small cult following for its emphasis on radical politics and queer identity. It was formed in 1996 by Abe Miner and Jeromy Ogg of Lincoln, Nebraska.

== History ==
Fagatron was formed in 1996 by seventeen-year-olds Jeromy Ogg and Abe Miner, inspired by British anarcho-punk, noise rock and hardcore punk. The band was named by combining the reclaimed slur fag and the name of the powerviolence band Armortron. During the summer of 1998, they recorded and released their self-titled 7" EP on Mo-tel Records, featuring 5 original songs and a cover version of "Love Shack" by the B-52's. After a tour in the Midwest United States, the band went on a hiatus from 1998 to 2002.

In the summer of 2002, the band released a split 7" EP on Agitprop! Records with Vermont punk band "Ninja Death Squad", featuring 5 Ninja Death Squad tracks on side A (titled "Evil"), and 3 Fagatron tracks on side B (titled "Gay").

They released their self-titled full-length record, 17 minutes in length and with 13 songs, on Agitprop! Records in 2002. Fagatron's music, composed of bass guitar, drums, and vocals, focused on themes such as gay culture, individualism, and contemporary US society. Their music was featured in two compilation albums focused on the queercore genre. Asskickatron and Punk You are both in the 2000 compilation CD Homocore Minneapolis: Live And Loud released by Lefty Records, alongside queercore bands like Tribe 8 and The Butchies. Asskickatron is on an Agitprop! compilation CD as well, Stand Up and Fucking Fight for it! Queers In Hardcore And Punk.

In 2003, the band announced via their website that they had broken up.

== Reception ==
Though much of their activity was underground, Fagatron received some media attention due to their intensity. Curran Nault in Queercore: Queer Punk Media Subculture described Fagatron's anthem "Asskickatron" as "the melding of confrontational queer politics and abrasive punk aesthetics made manifest". Their lyrics, according to Dave White of The Advocate, are "goofily witty and vigorous."

== Discography ==
- Fagatron (EP, 1998 Mo-tel Records)
- Fagatron / Ninja Death Squad (Split EP, 2002 Agitprop! Records)
- Fagatron (LP, 2002 Agitprop! Records)
