= Mykel Board =

American journalist and musician

- Born: January 31, 1950 (age 76); Long Island, New York, United States

Mykel Board (born January 31, 1950) is an American journalist, musician, and writer of English-language haiku. In 1980, he formed the punk rock] band Artless in New York City and created a number of experimental music records throughout the 1980s.

== Biography ==
Mykel Board was born and raised on Long Island and spent time hanging out in New York’s Greenwich Village counterculture as a teenager in the 1960s. In the late 1970s, Board began writing the column called "You're Wrong" for the punk publication Maximum RocknRoll. In the 1980s he also began performing in various punk bands, most notably Artless, which released a number of recordings and played regularly at venues throughout the U.S., and Big Man, which appeared on the first queercore compilation, J.D.s Top Ten Tape, released by J.D.s fanzine.

In 2005, Garrett County Press published his book Even A Daughter Is Better Than Nothing, Mykel's memoir about living and working in Mongolia.

== Bibliography ==
- Even A Daughter Is Better Than Nothing Garrett Country Press (2005) ISBN 1-891053-00-0
- I A, Me-ist Hope and Nonthings Press (2005) ISBN 0-9707458-9-3
- Threat By Example ed. by Martin Sprouse Pressure Drop Press 1989 includes essay by Board
- Bisexual Politics: Theories, Queries, and Visions ed. by Naomi Tucker Hayworth Press 1995 Board's essay "Pimple No More"
- Good Advice for Young Trendy People of All Ages ed. Jennifer Blowdryer, Manic D Press 2005 Board's essay "The Joy of Debt"
- Haiku for Lovers ed. Manu Bazzano, MQ Publication London, 2003 1 haiku
- The Haiku Anthology ed. Cor van den Heuval, Norton 1999, 3 haiku
