= Tracie Thomas =

American musician and actress

Tracie Thomas was born in Kenosha, Wisconsin in 1965. As a child, she moved to Boulder, Colorado. While in Boulder, she started the punk rock band, Anti-Scrunti Faction (A.S.F.) with Leslie Mah.

Tracie Thomas appeared in the film The Yo-Yo Gang by G.B. Jones. Tracie Thomas and Leslie Mah starred in the movie and performed their single, "Frat Boy".

After A.S.F. broke up in 1985, Tracie moved to New York City and joined the band Special Head. While living in NYC, she worked at an English Motorcycle Shop called Sixth Street Specials and for the famous motorcyclist Indian Larry.

Tracie Thomas currently resides in Florida and re-launched a clothing line called Trauma Tease Apparel in 2014.

Tracie's brother is the late Steven Thomas, founder of Webroot Software company.
