= Anti-Scrunti Faction =

Queercore punk rock band from Boulder, Colorado, US

- Origin: Boulder, Colorado, United States
- Genres: Punk, riot grrrl
- Years active: 1984-1985
- Labels: Unclean Records, Flipside
- Members: Leslie Mah; Tracie Thomas; Eric Van Leuven; Sarah Bibb

Anti-Scrunti Faction were an American queercore punk trio from Boulder, Colorado, United States.

The band made their first appearance in 1984 on the Restless Records compilation LP entitled FlipSide Vinyl Fanzine Volume 1, assembled by the fanzine Flipside, with the song "Big Women". In 1985, Anti-Scrunti Faction released A Sure Fuck, a single on Unclean Records. Appearing on the extended single are Leslie Mah, bass and vocals, Tracie Thomas, guitar and vocals, Sarah Bibb on drums for two songs and Eric Van Leuven on drums for the remaining four. Later that same year the album Damsels In Distress came out on Flipside Records. The artists' names are intentionally obscured on the album: the guitarist is listed as T. Thomas and the drummer is only named as "E". As on the single, these musicians are Tracie Thomas on guitar and Eric Van Leuven on drums. Credited as L. Mah, Leslie Mah again plays bass and sings.

After Anti-Scrunti Faction broke up, Leslie Mah moved to San Francisco and joined Tribe 8, regarded as one of the seminal queercore bands. However, Anti-Scrunti Faction continues to be popular among fans of old-school punk and fans of Tribe 8. The song "Slave to my Estrogen" is a stand-out favorite for radio airplay. In 1998, Tribe 8 recast "Slave To My Estrogen" as "Estrofemme" for their Role Models For AmeriKKKa album on Alternative Tentacles.

Anti-Scrunti Faction, also known by the initials A.S.F., were one of the bands to be featured in the first queercore zine, J.D.s. They also appeared in the film The Yo-Yo Gang by G.B. Jones. Leslie Mah and Tracie Thomas starred in the movie, and also performed the song "Frat Boy", from their single.

== Discography ==
- 1985: A Sure Fuck EP (Unclean Records)
- 1985: Damsels in Distress (Flipside Records)

== See also ==
- List of hardcore punk bands
