= Fist City (disambiguation) =

"Fist City" is a 1968 country music song by Loretta Lynn.

Fist City may also refer to:

- Fist City (Loretta Lynn album), a 1968 album by Loretta Lynn
- Fist City (Tribe 8 album), a 1995 album by Tribe 8
