= Kumbia Queers =

Argentine tropical-punk band

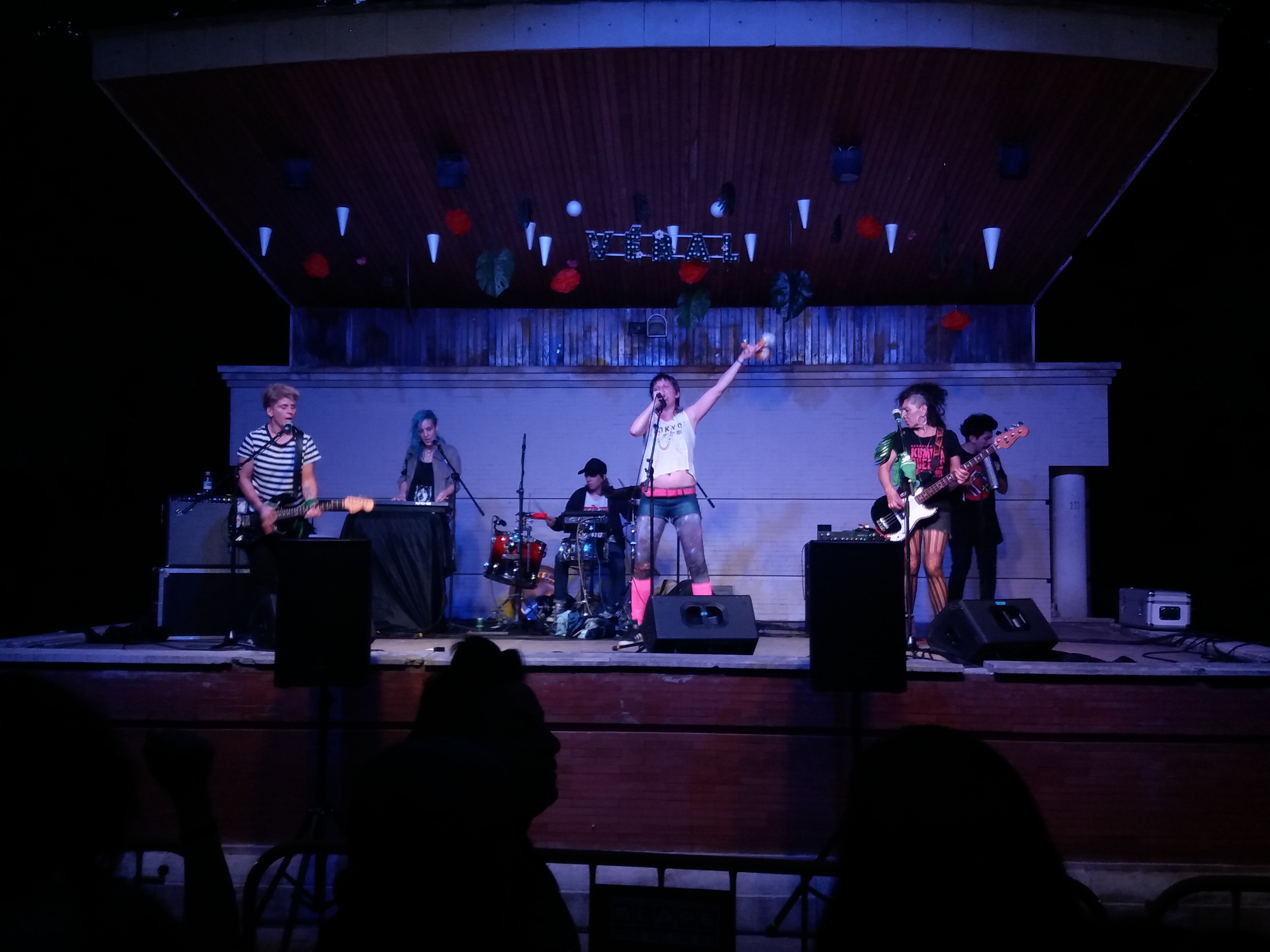
- Kumbia Queers in 2019

Background information
- Origin: Buenos Aires, Argentina
- Genres: Punk rock; cumbia; queercore
- Years active: 2007–present
- Members: Pilar Arrese; Inés Laurencena; Patricia Pietrafesa; Juana Chang; Rocktavia
- Past members: Ali Gua Gua
- Website: kumbiaqueers.com.ar

Kumbia Queers is an Argentine tropical-punk band, originally formed in Buenos Aires, Argentina in 2007.

== History ==
The project was born in Buenos Aires in 2007, the union of She Devils, Juana Chang and Florencia Lliteras (Happy Makers), (Argentina), with Ali Gua Gua of Las Ultrasónicas (México). At first, they played covers of The Cure, Madonna, Ramones, Black Sabbath, twisting them to the rhythm of cumbia with lyrics full of queer poetry and humor. With their third album, 2012 appeared, the group turned to their own songs and lyrics mainly.

In 2012, the band went on their third tour in Europe. Within 27 days they played at 23 locations from Stockholm to Madrid in a total of 25 concerts. 2014 was the band in Latin America and - at the invitation of the jury of the SXSW Festival - traveling in the United States. In summer 2015, the Kumbia Queers returned to Europe and performed with a new lineup, without Ali Gua Gua.

Each year, Kumbia Queers make over one hundred appearances. The number of fans is growing, especially in Chile, Mexico, Canada, Spain, Japan and Argentina.

== Band members ==
Current

- Pilar Arrese – guitar
- Inés Laurencena – drums
- Patricia Pietrafesa – bass
- Juana Chang – charango
- Rocktavia – keyboards

Past

- Ali Gua Gua – vocals

== Discography ==
- Kumbia nena! (2007)
- La gran estafa del tropipunk (2010)
- Pecados Tropicales (2012)
- Canta y no llores (2015)
- La Oscuridad Bailable (2019)
