= Agitprop! Records =

- Founded: 2002
- Founder: Jacob Tavares
- Genre: Queercore; Hardcore; Hip Hop
- Country of origin: United States
- Location: Boston, Massachusetts
- Official website: web.archive.org/web/20070630220920/http://www.agitproplovesyou.com/

Agitprop! Records is a 'revolutionary hardcore and hip hop' independent record label based in Boston, US, founded by Jacob Tavares. The name comes from the term Agitprop, a genre of political propaganda from Soviet-Russia.

One of the label's notable releases is the compilation Stand Up & Fucking Fight For It, its first full-length CD, released in 2002. The recording features queercore bands such as Fagatron, Best Revenge, The Rotten Fruits, Kids Like Us and others, and is one of a handful of queercore compilations to be released. Tavares said in the Fanorama zine, "I was 17 or 18 when I came out, and very much into hardcore and punk. It was weird being involved in these two different 'communities' - one that, at times, could be overrun with homophobia and heterosexism, and the other which I could find very little in common with other than that we fucked the same." He said that the compilation was inspired largely by the Outpunk label and its early-1990s Outpunk Dance Party, though he added that despite its reputation, Agitprop! is not specifically a "queer" label.

Other early releases included albums and vinyl singles by Ninja Death Squad and Fagatron, and Agitprop! also began issuing records by hip hop artists like Juha and Deep Dickollective.

Agitprop! was initially established as a distro, and continued to distribute other labels' recordings after it began releasing its own. The label is referenced in Homocore, a somewhat definitive guidebook to queercore history.

Tavares put Agitprop! on hiatus to focus on fiction writing (which has included "Fast Ones" from the Dennis Cooper anthology, Userlands). In 2007, Agitprop! returned, first by making much of its back-catalogue available through CDBaby. In December 2007, Juha's album The Grooms of God became the first new Agitprop! release since the label was revived.

== Artists on Agitprop! Records ==
- And I Can't Wait
- Best Revenge
- Deep Dickollective
- Fagatron
- Fakefight
- Free Verse
- Juha
- Kids Like Us
- Ninja Death Squad
- Skinjobs
- To See You Broken
- Iamloved

== See also ==
- List of record labels
