= Spitshine Records =

- Founded: 2001
- Founder: Ryan Revenge (Ryan Reed); Bilito Peligro (Bil Yoelin)
- Genre: Punk, queercore
- Country of origin: United States
- Location: Venice, California

Spitshine Records was a Venice, California-based independent record label specializing in independent punk rock and queercore music. The label was co-founded in 2001 (incorporated in 2002) by Ryan Revenge and Bilito Peligro of the queercore band Best Revenge. They founded the label to release music by Best Revenge but turned their attention to documenting music made by queercore bands in Los Angeles in the late 1990s/early 2000s.

== Roster ==
Bands such as Best Revenge, iamloved, The Skinjobs, $3 Puta, Brian Grillo, Prettypony, The Sharp Ease, Hot-N-Heavy, and The King Cheetah released records on Spitshine Records.
