= Rachael House =

British artist

- Known for: Artist, Cartoonist
- Movement: LGBTQIA+

Rachael House is a British multi-disciplinary artist, based in London and Whitstable.

Her work has been displayed at the Victoria and Albert Museum and she was guest artist at the "Feminism and Gender" exhibition at the New Hall Art Collection. Rachael House is a bisexual woman and feminist whose art reflects these positionalities.

She is a co-director, along with Jo David, of the artist-run space Space Station Sixty-Five in southeast London, which opened in Dulwich in 2002, and moved to Kennington, London in 2012.

Along with sculpture and painting, House is also a cartoonist. Currently, House has 27 works spread across 36 publications in 90 recorded library holdings. Her work in comics spans from the mid-1990s to the present day. She is known for her work in queer comics. As a queer woman and feminist, House's comics frequent themes and discourses around activism, queer theory, women and sex in an intersectional manner. Concepts of woman's beauty, aging and queer love are common in narrative comics written by House. Of House's current comics, the vast majority detail either queer themes, feminist themes, or both.

== Red Hanky Panky: popular feminist work in the 1990s ==
One of House's most prolific comics is her autobiographical comic called Red Hanky Panky. Produced in the 1990s, Red Hanky Panky has been described as "part of the thriving Queer zine scene". The comic series includes at least seven published issues, and follows House's own queer experience as a bisexual woman in art. Central themes in Red Hanky Panky include "Pride, homonormativity, bi-invisibility, and queer rage." In a YouTube series produced by the Queer Zine Archive Project, a popular digitization project in the comics world, House explains how Red Hanky Panky helped decentralize heteronormativity in comics during the '90s.

Apart from her specific works, there is plenty of published literature that detail House's contributions to the feminist movement. After Red Hanky Panky's success in the 1990s, House's artistic contributions to feminism have covered many decades.

== Recent works ==
In April 2015, Rachael House revisited her popular zine: Red Hanky Panky in a special ninth edition of the series. House presented the zine at the Queers & Comics conference in NY, which features talks and meet-and-greets with LGBTQ+ cartoonists and zine creators from across the world. With over two decades of distance from the last, eighth edition of Red Hanky Panky, House observes more mature themes surrounding queerness and feminism from an autobiographical perspective. As House detailed at the conference, "It's been interesting to look back through my drawings and reconnect with my younger self. I'm still fed up with the same stuff, more concerned now with menopause than periods, fewer sex comics lately, but hey ho, that may change."

Another popular comic by House is her Crones Zine. The zine is aimed at destigmatizing maturation in women. The cartoon features 13 illustrations of senior women, all of which are real people that House worked alongside to produce the work. In the zine, House refers to the group of women as 'crones' to help reclaim the title and rework beauty standards for aging women. Similar to House's other works, and in true zine style, Crones Zine features rugged and interpretive illustrations. This particular zine is all red and black to signify the passion and anger experienced by women who are expected to infantilize themselves.

Her art often takes the form of events. At "Apathy's a Drag" in May 2012 people were invited to create and float model boats on the lake in Southwark Park in commemoration of the Sex Pistols' river trip of 1977. She has organised "Peckham Pet-Tastic": "a fancy dress picnic for dogs" which "is a celebration of our creativity, our relationships with our pets, with each other and with Peckham", and similar events have been held in Blackpool, Bexhill-on-Sea, Lewisham and Hå in Norway. She has also organised numerous political zine-making workshops including one held at the Tate Modern. In 2010 she organised the "Peckham Peacocks", a festival for mobility scooter users.

== Graphic medicine through comics ==
Since the global outbreaks of COVID-19 in 2020, House has branched out to create graphic medicine comics. Graphic medicine is the use of comics and cartoons in medicine and patient care. While graphic medicine can frequently refer to doctor’s room posters and pamphlets, Resistance Sustenance Protection is another iteration of House’s trailblazing in the comics world. House's Resistance Sustenance Protection is a narrative comic book based on the mental health crisis that was born out of the COVID-19 pandemic. More specifically, the zine details the ebbs and flows of mental health and self-care throughout isolation. The zine reflects frequently changes tones and explores a range of emotions as to mimic her genuine experience during isolation. House created a small wave in the zine community that allowed for multiple iterations of graphic medicine in a similarly recreational way. Resistance Sustenance Protection also worked to destigmatize political propaganda around the pandemic; urging the readers to wash their hands and stay healthy both mentally and physically. Similar to many of her other works, this zine pulls together themes of intersectional, queer feminism.

Creatively, Resistance Sustenance Protection follows suit of House's other comics, including the popular Red Hanky Panky, where both the drawings and words are handwritten by House. Throughout her comics, the frequented themes of the queer experience and womanhood are paired with her signature scribble-like, cartoonish drawings. However, unsimilar from RHP, Resistance Sustenance Protection was published as a fully bound, hardcover book instead of a folded paper zine.

Similar to Red Hanky Panky, Resistance Sustenance Protection is completely autobiographical. Narratively, Resistance Sustenance Protection follows Rachael House's experience throughout COVID-19-related lockdowns with her partner. In exploring themes of queerness and mental health through a unique form of graphic medicine, the zine follows the narrator's slow, meandering days in isolation.

== Collaborations in the LGBTQ+ comix space ==
The Queer Zine Archive Project, in partnership with Project MUSE, explored the impact of comics and zines in graphic medicine before and during the pandemic. Project MUSE works alongside publishers, libraries, and authors to create and disseminate work based in social sciences and humanities. Using House as a case study, the collaborators detail the intersection of cartoons and healthcare discourse. The QZAP and Project MUSE found that House frequently uses metaphors to draw sufficient emotional connections between readers and their lived experiences. The zine primarily lives within a high-context, cult-like zine community with a fair understanding of House's ethos as an artist.

== Early life and education ==
House has a BA in Philosophy from the University of Kent (1983), a BA in Fine Art from Central Saint Martins School of Art (2004) and an MA in Fine Art from Camberwell School of Art (2011).
