= Homocore (zine) =

American anarcho-punk zine

- Homocore Issue #4 cover featuring Genderfuck artist Jerome Caja (June 1989)
- Editor: Tom Jennings
- Staff writers: Deke Motif Nihilson
- Categories: Queer, Queercore, Anarcho-punk
- Frequency: Monthly
- First issue: 1988
- Final issue: 1991
- Country: United States
- Based in: San Francisco
- Website: Homocore Archive

Homocore was an American anarcho-punk zine created by Tom Jennings and Deke Nihilson, and published in San Francisco from 1988 to 1991. One of the first queer zines, Homocore was directed toward the hardcore punk youth of the gay underground. The publication has been noted for popularizing the queercore movement on the United States west coast.

== History ==
The word 'homocore' was coined by G.B. Jones and Bruce LaBruce in the Toronto-based queer punk zine J.D.s. The term is a portmanteau of homosexual and hardcore, and is used as a description of their audience: disenfranchised queer hardcore punks. The word first appeared in J.D.'s issue #1 in 1985.

Tom Jennings borrowed the word 'homocore' after he and co-editor Deke Nihilson met Jones and LaBruce at the 1988 Anarchist Survival Gathering in Toronto. Inspired by the editors of J.D.'s, and other anarchists, Jennings and Nihilson returned to San Francisco and began the Homocore zine. The first issue was published in September 1988. Although their initial audience was the queer underground within the San Francisco area, letters published in later issues came from readers around the world. Homocore featured writers, artists and bands such as the anarcho-punk group The Apostles, photographer Daniel Nicoletta, Chainsaw Records label owner and musician Donna Dresch, writer and founder of Lookout Records Larry Livermore, Bruce LaBruce and G.B. Jones. Steve Abbott first published excerpts of what would become the novel The Lizard Club in Homocore. Writing for The Village Voice, author Dennis Cooper started off his 1990 survey of the then-nascent queer zine scene with a review of this zine, noting "Homocore is the most generous and info-packed of the zines."

Subsequently, eight issues were published over a 16-month period, ending in February 1991. An odd issue, titled Bad Poetry Issue #5½, resulted from the use of overlarge newsprint paper. The editors also organized Homocore events in which bands such as Fugazi, MDC, Beat Happening and Comrades In Arms appeared. The 1991 short film Shred Of Sex by Greta Snider was made at Homocore headquarters.

== Influence and cultural significance ==
Homocore has been noted as being instrumental in popularizing the queercore movement, especially on the west coast of North America. In the book DIY: The Rise of Lo-Fi Culture, Amy Spencer stated that "zines acknowledged that their origins stemmed directly from the existence of J.D.s and Homocore." Spencer further wrote that Homocore and similar zines became "required reading material" for those disillusioned by other more mainstream gay choices.

In his book examining zines, Stephen Duncombe explains, "Queer punk rockers, for example, feel unrepresented in both predominantly straight punk zines and the liberal assimilationist gay and lesbian press. Therefore, they use zines like Homocore and J.D.s as virtual meeting places, spaces to define and communicate who they are, and remind themselves (and others) that they are not alone." Christopher Wilde in a 2007 essay for Queer Life said it was Homocore' #7, the final issue, which is the "most fondly remembered of all queer zines" and "cemented its reputation as a leader in the evolution of the [radical queer] scene."

== Issues ==
- Homocore #1, September 1988
- Homocore #2, December 1988
- Homocore #3, February 1989
- Homocore #4, June 1989
- Homocore #5, December 1989
- Homocore #5½
- Homocore #6, May 1990
- Homocore #7, February 1991
