= Tribe 8 =

American lesbian punk rock band

- Origin: San Francisco, California
- Genres: Punk rock
- Years active: 1991–2005
- Labels: Outpunk, Alternative Tentacles
- Past members: Lynn Breedlove; Leslie Mah; Flipper (Silas Howard); Slade Bellum; Jen Schwartz; Mama T Tantrum; Kat Buell
- Website: www.tribe8.com

Tribe 8 was a lesbian punk rock band from San Francisco, considered one of the first queercore groups. The band took their name from the practice of tribadism, with "tribe eight" being a play on the word tribade, a sexual practice sometimes also known as "scissoring."

== Band members ==
The makeup of the group changed over time, but Lynn Breedlove and Leslie Mah (formerly of Anti-Scrunti Faction) were consistent members. Other members included Flipper (Silas Howard), Slade Bellum, Jen Schwartz, Mama T, Kat Buell, and Tantrum.

== Concerts ==
In concert, lead singer Breedlove frequently performed shirtless, wearing a strap-on dildo, and encouraged audience members to interact with it. Their songs often deal with subjects such as S/M, nudity, fellatio, and transgender issues, and the band was the subject of controversy because of this. An article from the Chicago Tribune praised their Fireside Bowl show in 1998 stating "If the members of Tribe 8 play punk rock like they own it, it's only because they do."

Tribe 8 toured throughout the United States, playing at venues such as DUMBA and 924 Gilman Street; they also played in Europe and Canada, and released a number of recordings on independent record labels.

In 1996, the band made its screen debut in A Gun For Jennifer, directed by Todd Morris. The band performs live in the documentary film She's Real, Worse Than Queer by Lucy Thane, released in 1997. Members of the band are also interviewed, speaking about a range of topics including the development of the queercore music scene. In 2003 the film Rise Above: A Tribe 8 Documentary, by director Tracy Flannigan, was released, documenting not only performances by the band but the motivations and reasons behind the band and the part it plays in their lives. The movie has won many awards at film festivals throughout the U.S.

== Other work ==
Outside of the band, Lynn Breedlove is also the author of a novel, Godspeed, published in 2002, now translated into German as Goetterspeed, and a memoir Lynnee Breedlove's One Freak Show published in 2009, winner of the 2010 Lambda Award for Transgender Writing. Leslie Mah has appeared in various films including The Yo-Yo Gang by G. B. Jones; Shut Up White Boy, co-directed by Vu T. and Thu Ha; and produced her own film, Estrofemme, in 1998. Breedlove wrote, co-directed, co-produced, and starred in a short film, Godspeed, based on his novel. It debuted in festivals in 2007. It features Jillian Lauren, Adam Horowitz, Leslie Mah, and Bucky Sinister, with cameos by Meliza Banales and Jewelle Gomez. His comedy solo show on trans bodies, community and feminism, "Lynnee Breedlove's One Freak Show", toured worldwide from 2004 to 2009. He now runs Homobiles, a queer ride service.

Outside of Tribe 8, Jen Schwartz is a solo singer, songwriter, multi-instrumentalist and producer who released her debut album Candy from a Stranger in 2000. She also owns Rampage Productions, a service business for musicians in Los Angeles. In 2010, she formed the band Me of a Kind. Me of a Kind's debut album is slated for release in the fall of 2010 on the Rampage Productions label.

== Discography ==
=== Albums and EPs ===
- Allen's Mom EP 1994, Outpunk Records
- By the Time We Get to Colorado EP, 1995, Outpunk Records
- Roadkill Cafe EP, 1995, Alternative Tentacles
- Fist City 1995 Alternative Tentacles
- Snarkism 1996, Alternative Tentacles
- Role Models for Amerika 1998 Alternative Tentacles
- Thanx For the Mammaries 2005 Self

=== Singles ===
- Pig Bitch EP 7-inch, 1991, Harp Records
- Bitches and Brews split 7-inch single with Blatz 1992 Lookout! Records

=== Compilation appearances ===
- There's a Dyke in the Pit 7-inch EP, 1991 Outpunk - "Manipulate"
- Stars Kill Rock, 1993 Kill Rock Stars - "Speed Fortress"
- Outpunk Dance Party, 1996 Outpunk - "Oversized Ego"
- New Women's Music Sampler-Class of 1999, 1999, Mr Lady - "What The Papers Didn't Say"
