= Rise Above: The Tribe 8 Documentary =

- Directed by: Tracy Flannigan
- Release dates: October 19, 2004 (Copenhagen Gay and Lesbian Film Festival)
- Running time: 80 minutes
- Country: United States
- Language: English

Rise Above: The Tribe 8 Documentary is a 2004 American documentary film about the all women queercore punk band Tribe 8 directed and produced by Tracy Flannigan.

== Description ==
The film chronicles live performances, candid moments of their lives at work and on the road, and the controversy at the Michigan Womyn's Music Festival, an all women's music festival, that landed them in a quagmire of protest and praise from a fiercely divided crowd. It also captures the truly funny and warm people behind the music and the politics. Starting with their controversial gig at the 1994 Michigan Womyn's Music Festival, the film chronicles four years of the band.

The images presented on stage of blow jobs, sadomasochistic acts and mock castrations are not shocking the audience for shock's sake, for example Lynn Breedlove, the lead singer wore a strap-on dildo. Breedlove often got young men up from the audience to "service" him, this act was to break the taboo of straight male penetration. The documentary portrays on a deeper level through the band members' intense personal disclosures.

== Cast ==
Tribe 8 Band Members:

- Lynn Breedlove, Lead Singer
- Silas 'Flipper' Howard, Guitar
- Leslie Mah, Guitar
- Keiron Lynn 'Tantrum', Bass Player
- Slade, Drums
- Mama T., Bass Player
- Jen Schwartz, Drums

== Reception ==
As Chuck Wilson writes in LA Weekly, "Filmmaker Tracy Flannigan gets it all in close-up, but also captures the rich and complex life stories of these women, whose lives take on political weight based on sheer authenticity". These interviews inform an understanding and respect for why they do what they do. Especially insightful are the interviews with singer Lynn Breedlove and her mother. This documentary concludes that it is the humor and physicality that lies within the controversial performance that gives these five individuals the peace to experience the rapture of being alive. Kevin Thomas, in the Los Angeles Times, says "their lyrics are confrontational and political, but also cathartic... exudes the sheer exhilaration of individuals who have learned how to live liberated, fulfilling lives."

Dennis Harvey's review for Variety states the film is "A suitably raw, wholly engaging documentary.... offers a unique perspective on the lesbian community’s own shift... to a more encompassing embrace of rebellious fringe elements".

Reece Pendleton of Chicago Reader noted it was "a routine documentary" and "only real drama dates to 1994", noting when a protest was held against the band.

== Awards ==
The film has won many awards, including "Best Documentary" at Frameline Film Festival in San Francisco, "Audience Award" at the Hamburg Gay and Lesbian Film Festival, and the award for "Outstanding Emerging Talent" at OUTfest, the Los Angeles Gay and Lesbian Film Festival.
