= Meliza Bañales =

American writer, performer, and slam poet

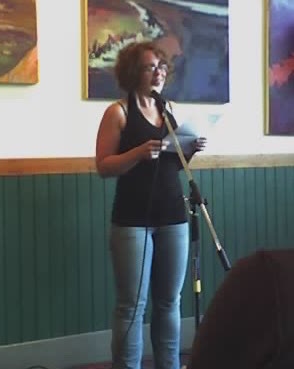
- Meliza Bañales reading her work
- Born: Los Angeles, California
- Education: University of California, Santa Cruz
- Writing career
- Language: English
- Genres: poetry, spoken word

Meliza Bañales is an American writer, performer, and slam poet. She has lived in the San Francisco Bay Area, Santa Cruz, and Los Angeles.

== Writing ==
Bañales has been involved in spoken-word and writing since 1996. She gained recognition for being the first Latina on the West Coast to win a poetry slam championship in 2002. She was the 2002 winner of the People Before Profits Poetry Prize. Her poems have appeared in many magazines and anthologies, including Revolutionary Voices: A Multicultural Queer Youth Anthology, Without A Net: The Female Experience of Growing-Up Working-Class, Baby Remember My Name: New Queer Girl Writing, and Word Warriors.

She has nonfiction articles on poetry and politics in Encyclopædia Britannica, The First Encyclopedia of Activism and Social Change, The Encyclopedia of Activism and Social Justice, and Encyclopedia of Governance.

Her film, Do the Math, with award-winning director Mary Guzman was the 2006 winner of a Frameline Completion Grant and screened at Outfest 2007.

== Awards and recognitions ==
- Winner, 2002 Poetry Slam Championship (Oakland, California)
- Winner, 2002 People Before Profits Poetry Prize
- Grant Recipient, Queer Cultural Center
- 2006 Frameline Completion Grant
- 2006 LA Fusion film festival, Honorable Mention
- 2016 Lambda Literary Award for Debut Fiction nominee for Life Is Wonderful, People Are Terrific

== Performance ==
Bañales performed regularly from 2000 to 2010 in the San Francisco Bay Area. She was one of the artists on tour with Sister Spit: The Next Generation (2007).

She sometimes performs under the moniker "Missy Fuego" and her name is often spelled "Meliza Banales". She was a cast member in the 2008 Dark Room Theater production of The Ten Commandments: Live!, and appeared in Lynnee Breedlove's short film Godspeed in 2007.

Other venues where Bañales has performed include Julia Serano's GenderEnders, Femina Potens, SFinX (SF in Exile), Mad to Live: Queers Under the Influence of the Beats curated by Michelle Tea, the Queer Cultural Center, Litquake; and many more.

== Works ==
- For the Love of Things Not Said, Poemas (Chula Press, 2000)
- Scratching a Surface, Poemas Y Mas (Chula Press, 2001)
- Girl with the Glass Throat (Chula Press, 2001)
- and I've been fighting ever since (Chula Press, 2002)
- Say It With Your Whole Mouth (Monkey Press, 2003)
- Life Is Wonderful, People Are Terrific (Ladybox Books, 2015)
