= Brennan Wedl =

American indie musician (born 1997)

- Born: June 18, 1997 (age 29)
- Genres: Americana; alt-country; country rock; queercore
- Instruments: Vocals; guitar
- Years active: 2012–Present
- Label: Anti-
- Formerly of: Dazey and the Scouts, Sex Education
- Website: www.brennanwedl.com

Brennan Wedl (born 1997) is an American indie musician from Minneapolis, Minnesota who is currently based in Nashville, Tennessee. Wedl was previously in the queercore group, Dazey and the Scouts.

== Early life ==
From an early age, Wedl wrote and performed songs. The first instrument Wedl learned to play was violin, but she transitioned into learning guitar when her violin teacher stopped offering lessons. In high school, Wedl started a jam band with her uncle, which helped her learn to perform in front of an audience, as well as playing in the band, Sex Education. Wedl's Catholic upbringing and her parents’ divorce influence her songwriting.

== Musical career ==
=== Dazey and the Scouts ===
In 2016, Wedl joined the band, Dazey and the Scouts, alongside Lea Jaffe, Otto Klammer, and Austin Corona, who Wedl met while attending Berklee College of Music.

In 2017, Dazey and the Scouts self-released the album, Maggot. It was named one of Allston Pudding’s favorite EPs of 2017.

Dazey and the Scouts broke up in March 2018.

At the beginning of the COVID-19 pandemic, the band's music went viral on TikTok, gaining millions of views. In 2022, Dazey and the Scouts reunited to play a sold-out reunion show at Elsewhere.

=== Solo career ===
In March 2017, Wedl released her first EP, Jersey Devil and in August 2019, she released her first album, Holy Water Branch. Her most recent EP, Sleeping With Jeans On was released in 2021.

In May 2024, Wedl was signed to the label Kill Rock Stars and was named “an Artist to Watch” by Stereogum.

In August 2025, Wedl performed at Gather No Moss, a concert series launched by Rolling Stone .

In spring 2026, Wedl was signed to ANTI- Records and played a series of sold-out shows with Waxahatchee and MJ Lenderman.

Wedl's self-titled second studio album, produced by Katie Crutchfield and Brad Cook, was released August 21, 2026. Paste wrote that the record “feels like Wedl’s definitive moment of striking out on her own, proving herself as a daring leading lady of Southern rock.”

In the fall of 2026, she will tour as an opening act with Snail Mail and Soccer Mommy.

Allston Pudding dubbed Wedl as “the love child of Nancy Sinatra and Elliott Smith”. Get In Her Ears has described Wedl as having “rich lyrical storytelling and silky smooth alternative country musicality”. Audiotree stated about her 2025 performance, “Wedl oscillates between sweetly lilting country one minute and crashing rock the next.” Katie Crutchfield described Wedl’s voice as, “immediately iconic, so timeless and confident” and said about Wedl, “this person’s writing huge melodies that can be played in arenas. This is a really different level of songwriting.”
