= She Devils =

Argentine punk group

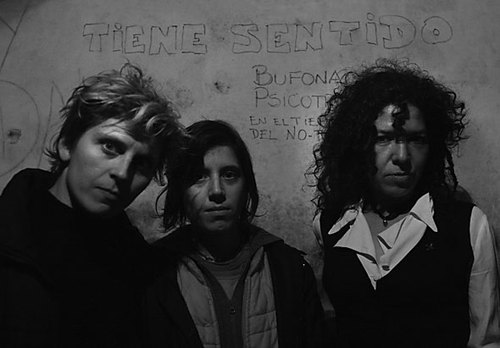
She devils

She-Devils is an Argentine punk group that started 1995. The band has often been associated with the homocore and Queercore genres.

The group members are: Patricia Pietrafiesa (bass and vocals), Pilar (guitar) and Inés (drums). Patricia Pietrafiesa previously played bass for the punk rock group Cadaveres de Niños and she was the publisher of Resistencia, the very first punk fanzine that existed in Argentina. The members of the band are also part of the Mexican/Argentine tropical-punk band Kumbia Queers.

Their recording debut was a split 7-inch with the band Fun People entitled El Aborto Ilegal Asesina my Libertad ("Illegal Abortion Kills My Freedom") in the year 1997. In 1999 they released their first LP La Piel Dura.

The lyrics on the songs often deal with issues such as Gay Rights, non-violent action, animal rights, ecology, DIY ethics and feminism.

They are also the organizers of the Belladona Festival which has taken place at least once a year since 1997, a festival in which female artists show their art (female bands, plastic artists, film directors, etc.).
