= Best Revenge =

American queercore punk band

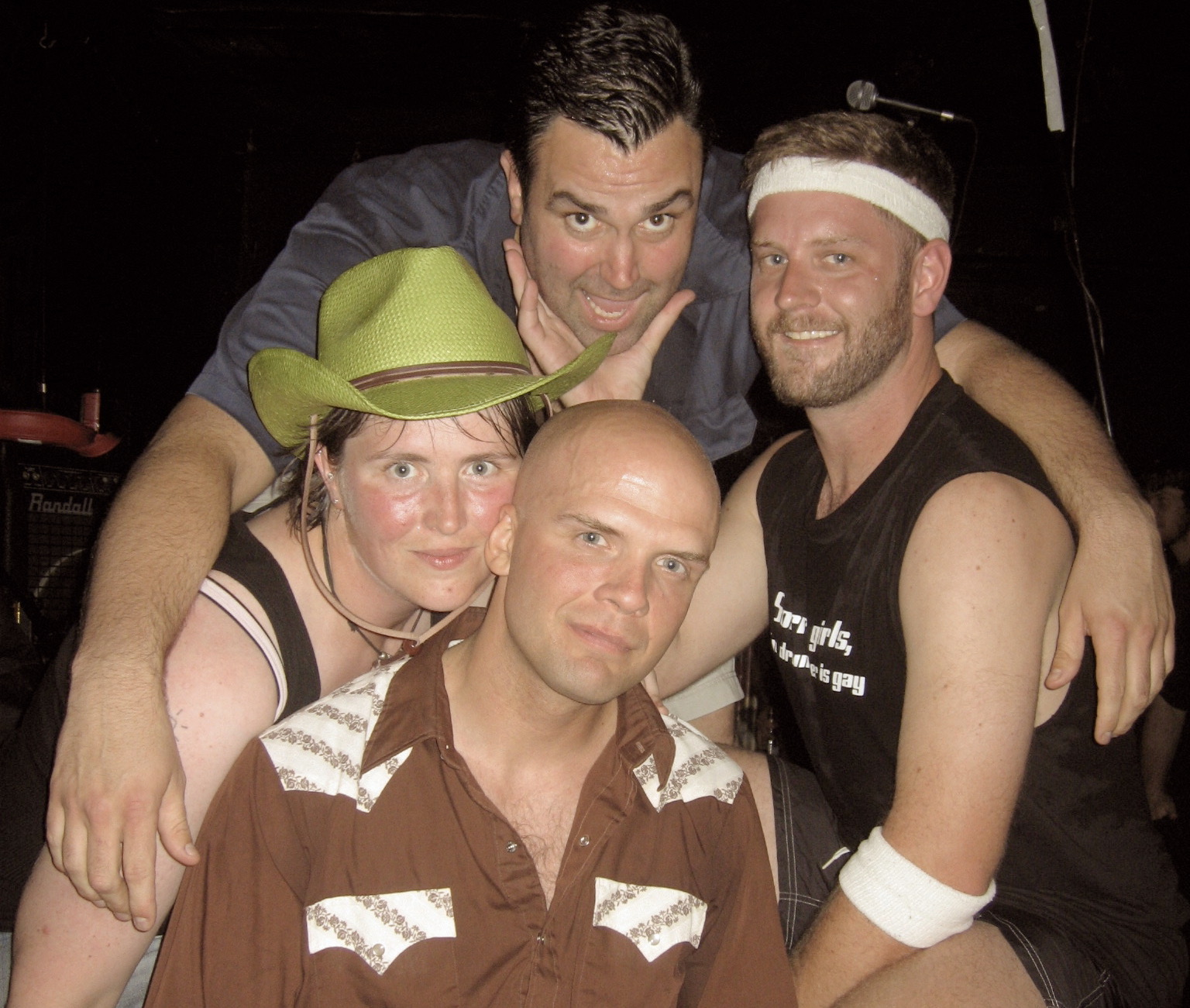
- Best Revenge 2006 reunion gig group photo

Background information
- Origin: Los Angeles, CA, United States
- Genres: Punk rock, queercore
- Years active: 1998-2002, 2006
- Label: Spitshine
- Past members: Ryan Revenge; KT; Bilito Peligro; Frisky McNicholl; Shug; Glen Livid

Best Revenge was a queercore punk band from Los Angeles. They were active as a studio and live act from the beginning of 1998 until December 2002.

== History ==
Best Revenge was formed by members Ryan Revenge (vocals/guitar) and KT (bass/vocals) in early 1998. The two were previously in a band called Happybomb while attending college at the University of Southern California. Revenge pitched to KT his idea of putting together a melodic punk rock band with queer-oriented lyrics, playing her a few songs he'd been working on including one that would later become one of the band's anthems, "Punk Rock Fag."

While searching for a rehearsal space and a drummer, the two found both when they answered an ad to rent a garage space in Venice Beach, CA. The garage space was coincidentally at the former home of Jordan Crane, and the current occupant of the house was Bilito Peligro, who later joined the band on drums.

The gathering scene created the need for a record label to document the music that would probably never find a place in the major label mainstream. Peligro and Revenge responded by starting up Spitshine Records, which went on to put out all of Best Revenge's releases as well as releases by local acts IAMLOVED, $3 Puta, Brian Grillo (of Extra Fancy and Lock Up), Hot-N-Heavy, the Sharpease and a Freak Show compilation CD.

== Post-Best Revenge ==
After Best Revenge, Ryan Revenge played with the bands Exit Plan and Terrazzo. In June 2012, he completed his doctoral work in Political Science, earning a Ph.D. from the University of California, Davis. He is currently employed as an associate professor at Bradley University. Bilito Peligro and Frisky McNichol played with the Gay-Gays, the all-gay Go-Go's tribute band. Bilito has continued playing drums for Los Angeles bands Miata, Temperamentals, and Local Channel (LCL CHNNL). KT skated as Trixie Biscuit on a banked track roller derby team called Fight Crew, performs as a stunt woman in film and television, and is Operations Specialist at the Maximum Fun podcast network.

The Best Revenge song, "Know You", was featured in the 2004 gay horror film Hellbent, which also featured songs by such notable queercore bands as Three Dollar Bill and Pansy Division.

Best Revenge was featured in the 2005 book Homocore:The Loud and Raucous Rise of Queer Punk by Ken Knox and David Ciminelli.

== Discography ==
=== LPs and EPs ===
Year	Title	Label	Other information
2000	Begin	Spitshine Records	Debut EP
2001	Pink On the Inside	Spitshine Records	Split EP with prettypony
2002	Starts With You	Spitshine Records	LP

=== Compilation appearances ===
Year	Song title	Album title	Label	Other information
2001	Rockabilly Boy, Cockring for Christmas	Freak Show, Year One	The Freak Show	Compilation
2002	Bash Back	Stand Up & Fucking Fight For It	Agitprop! Records	Compilation
2002	Typical	One Year Later...It Still Hurts: Queers Against G8	Speeddemon	Compilation
2003	Bash Back (Live on KXLU)	Freak Show, Year Three	The Freak Show	Compilation

== Band members ==
The band experienced several lineup changes, first spurred by the departure of bassist KT just after the completion of the Starts With You full-length.
Lineup 1, 1998-December 2001:
Ryan Revenge, vocals and guitar
KT, bass and vocals
Bilito Peligro, drums and vocals

Lineup 2, January 2002-May 2002:
Ryan Revenge, vocals and guitar
Bilito Peligro, drums and vocals
Shug, bass and vocals

Lineup 3, May 2002-December 2002:
Ryan Revenge, vocals and guitar
Bilito Peligro, drums and vocals
Glen Livid, bass
Frisky McNicholl, second guitar and vocals

Lineup 4, final show December 6, 2002:
Ryan Revenge, vocals and guitar
Bilito Peligro, drums and vocals
KT, bass and vocals
Frisky McNicholl, second guitar and vocals
