= Swan Island (band) =

American rock band

- Origin: Portland, Oregon, United States
- Genres: Rock, new wave
- Years active: 2004–2008
- Members: Vera Domini; Aubree Bernier-Clarke; Torrence Stratton; Brisa Gonzalez; Bob E. Kendrick
- Website: www.swanislandlove.com

Swan Island was an American five-piece rock band from Portland, Oregon, United States. Their music was influenced by classic rock, new wave, progressive rock, and metal, as well as queercore bands from the Pacific Northwest.

The band was started in March 2004 by drummer Vera Domini (Menagerie/DJ Automaton) and guitarist Aubree Bernier-Clarke (Half-Seas-Over). They were soon joined by guitarist Torrence Stratton, vocalist Brisa Gonzalez, and bassist Bob E. Kendrick (Shemo and owner of 16 records). Swan Island performed with Sleater-Kinney, Mary Timony, LKN, The Gossip, Tracy and the Plastics, and others on the west coast. In the summer of 2006 they performed at the week-long Homo-A-Go-Go festival in Olympia, Washington. Many of the members of Swan Island have been involved with Rock and Roll Camp for Girls.

The band's records have been reviewed at Spin Magazine, AllMusic, and PopMatters.

== Discography ==
- Night Owl, 3"CD on 16 Records, 2005
- The Centre Will Hold, LP on 16 Records / Holocene Music, September 2006
