= Fanorama =

American zine

Fanorama (also known as Fanorama Society and Fanorama Cabal) is a Rhode Island–based zine and zine-distro produced by journalist/activist REB (Richard E. Bump). According to their website it is the "grand-daddy of the queer zine scene".

First published in 1992, Fanorama emerged as part of the queercore movement, largely inspired by the zine J.D.s (edited by G.B. Jones and Bruce LaBruce), and the Toronto scene from which J.D.s came. Initially a punk-edged collage of gay porn and commentary, REB soon added a strong, anti-assimilationist political voice to the mix, turning the zine into an artful version of the weekly "Queerbeat" column he contributed to Rhode Island's alternative arts newspaper, The NicePaper. The Fanorama tag line at the time became, "For those who want a little smut with their politics, or a little politics with their smut."

Fanorama began to generate controversy, particularly as it addressed racism and sexism in the gay mainstream establishment; one detractor in the media called REB a "kiddie pornographer-turned-moral watchdog". During this period, REB was instrumental in leading protests against a local gay bar over a management-led racist incident - a battle which would take center stage in the gay politics of Rhode Island for the better part of a year. Despite what he began to call his "infamy," REB's popularity as a personality grew, and he was invited to emcee a mid-1990s Rhode Island Gay Pride celebration; though accepting the position, he would take its organizers to task in later years for the increasing commercialism of the event.

Over the course of its publication, Fanorama ran interviews and photo essays with such queer counter-culture heroes as comic book artist Robert Kirby, punk rockers Pansy Division, filmmaker and zine editor Scott Treleaven, and Tommy Ace of the controversial AIDS humor zine, Diseased Pariah News. It has been dubbed "the Grandaddy of Queerzines" by Factsheet 5. After publishing an issue in which REB mourned his break-up with future Juha frontman Collin Clay, Fanorama took a turn towards pagan spirituality, influenced greatly by his work with the Radical Faeries.

The latest incarnation of Fanorama was essentially as a prisoners' rights magazine influenced initially by the stories prisoners sent to its letters to the editor section. It still retains pornography and spiritual angles. The relationships REB developed with prisoners over time were also the impetus for Fanorama to become a publisher of prisoner-authored works. This has led to its constituency expanding from its queer following to include an anarcho-punk/activist readership, particularly since having caught the attention of Maximum Rocknroll and Punk Planet, and more recently gaining the praises of headbanger favorite, Metal Maniacs. REB told Punk Planet in 2005: "After doing my zine for over 12 years, after publishing and distributing countless inmate-produced publications, after corresponding with literally hundreds of prisoners, the only folks who ever made me feel 'unsafe' were folks in the free world."

The film division of Fanorama has included REB's documentary Queer Rage (chronicling events leading up to and coming out of a riot at the RI State House) and art films Nocturne In E Flat, Jerk Off '94, Waltz of the Flowers, and 13 Boys. Shot mostly on Super-8 film or video, they have been screened at queer indie film festivals across the United States and Canada. In November 2013, he debuted a new film, Rituels Queer at the 26th NYC MIX Experimental Film Festival. In 2014, Rituels Queer was selected to screen at Queer City Cinema Inc. (based in Regina, Saskatchewan, Canada) and at the 6th Entzaubert DIY Queer International Film Festival in Berlin. REB also facilitates workshops and is a speaker on the issues of zine making, queer rights, and prisoners' rights. Excerpts from Fanorama have been published in the gay-oriented encyclopedia Out In All Directions (Warner Books), That's Revolting: Queer Strategies For Resisting Assimilation, edited by Matt Bernstein Sycamore (Suspect Thoughts), and Afterwords: Real Sex From Gay Men's Diaries.

In 2007, REB was part of a collective that opened The Akron Earthworm, an underground live music venue and art gallery in Akron, Ohio. In 2008, after The Earthworm closed, REB founded Hellville Records and released Medusa Complex's In Search of the Laconic Ideal cdep in 2008 and Mockingbird's S/T lp in 2011.

In October 2008, Fanorama was featured in a comprehensive retrospective of queer zines at The NY Art Book Fair held at Phillips de Pury & Company. In April 2017, Fanorama was featured in Kweerblam, curated by QZAP, at the Woodland Pattern Book Center in Milwaukee, Wisconsin. REB also screened five of his experimental films at the show's closing night. He recently released the 25th. anniversary issue of Fanorama featuring original photography.

== Zine'ography ==
- Ambiguous Ambrosia by Paul Moore
- The Ashes of Dahlia by Faith Phillips
- Birdland by a Soledad State Prison collective
- Chairman Of The Bored by a Folsom State Prison Anarchist Collective
- Fanorama by REB
- Flakes by Darren Hamby
- Flowers From The Grave by Walter James
- The Hated by William Wright
- Left Back by Chadd Beverlin
- Obscene Emission by Neil Edgar
- One Woman's Story by Kebby Warner
- Punk Pagan by Michael Killeen
- Reflections by Frederick Fisher
- Solitary Existence by Travis "SK8" Harramen
- Thoughts Of My Liberation by Frederick Fisher
- Unheard Silence by Devin Baker
- Wiener Society by Neil Edgar
