= Homobiles =

American rideshare organization

- Established: 2011; 15 years ago
- Founder: Lynn Breedlove
- Type: Nonprofit
- Region served: San Francisco, California, U.S.
- Services: Vehicle for hire
- Website: www.homobilessf.org

Homobiles is an American nonprofit organization founded in 2011 which provides rides primarily to the San Francisco LGBT community on a pay-what-you-can model. Lynn Breedlove founded the organization as an alternative to taxi services and public transportation in order to counter discrimination against drag queens, transgender riders, and other members of the LGBT community. Rides are arranged through phone call, text message, or mobile application similar to other transportation network (ridesharing) companies.

== Services ==
Homobiles offers transportation in the San Francisco area with a primary focus on passengers who experience discrimination when trying to use other modes of transportation. Services are marketed towards the LGBT community, but rides can be scheduled by anyone regardless of identity. Service is generally accessed via text, phone call, website, or mobile app. The passenger specifies their name, location, destination, and pick-up time to schedule the ride. After a ride is scheduled, the information is texted to Homobiles drivers, and the closest driver picks up the passenger at the arranged time and location.

Because of its similarities to other ridesharing services, Homobiles has been called "Uber for drag queens". Like other ridesharing companies, drivers provide their own vehicles when driving for Homobiles, riders can pre-arrange rides, and lower-cost shared transportation with other passengers—branded Homoshuttling—has been introduced similar to products like Uber Pool. Unlike other ridesharing companies, Homobiles is a nonprofit organization and operates on a pay-what-you-can model. Riders are given a suggested fare based upon the duration of the trip, but riders may pay less or more. This model allows them to provide services regardless of a passenger's ability to pay as free or discounted rides are offset by passengers voluntarily paying fares higher than suggested.

== History ==
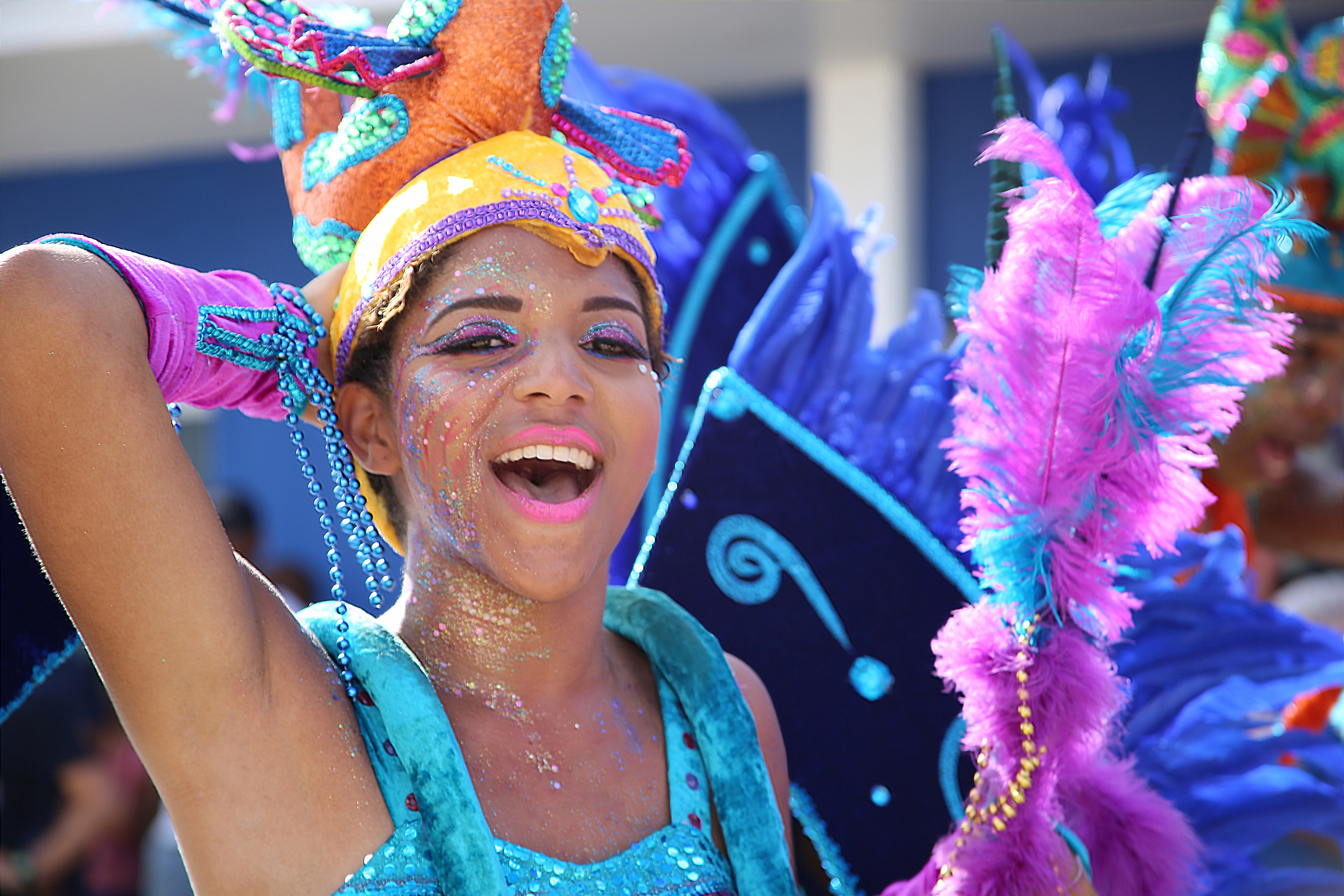
Taxi companies prefer not to give rides to people wearing glitter makeup that leaves residue in the vehicle.

Homobiles was founded in 2011 by Lynn Breedlove. According to Breedlove, he developed the initial concept of Homobiles after he drove his friend, a transgender sex worker, back to her hotel and offered to wait until she safely returned to her room. After providing free rides to friends attending the Femme Conference in Oakland in 2010, Breedlove observed that there was a need for rides for women and drag queens, as well as other members of the LGBT community who were willing to provide rides. Breedlove founded Homobiles the following year as a donation-based service with rides scheduled via text message.

The organization was established as an alternative for LGBT riders who faced discrimination and harassment in taxis and traditional public transportation. Because of San Francisco's gay nightlife culture, many members of the LGBT community seek rides throughout the area. Particularly visible members of the community such as drag queens, or those who dressed provocatively given their destination, may face harassment in public or on transit. These riders may also face discrimination when summoning a vehicle for hire such as taxis due to their identity, appearance, or costume. For example, some riders report that they are unable to get rides due to their glitter makeup as the glitter can be hard for the driver to clean up following the ride.

After launch Homobiles was met with initial opposition from San Francisco's taxi companies, but their focus on customers that taxis did not want to pick up—those wearing glitter, assless chaps, or unable to pay the fare—helped to ease tensions. In 2013, when the California Public Utilities Commission created the definition of a transportation network company (TNC) in order to regulate companies such as Uber and Lyft, the commission praised Homobiles for catering to "the underserved communities of San Francisco". The organization had 10 drivers picking up approximately 150 rides per day in 2014. In a 2018 interview, Breedlove said that the number of Homobiles drivers had remained generally constant since it was established.

== 2025 Relaunch In Response to LA Fires ==
In response to the LA fires, Breedlove relaunched the Homobiles service in January 2025. Breedlove stated the expanded mission of Homobiles "JAN 2025: At this time we are expanding Homobiles SF to include teams of drivers who can drive from the Bay Area to LA and back to support people who needs rides between the two areas. We are looking for drivers in both cities to assist survivors of the LA fires. We are connecting people who have places and/or supplies with those who are seeking assistance.". A new website was set up at https://homobilessf.org as the previous org site had expired and was no longer available.
