= The Apostles (band) =

English punk rock band

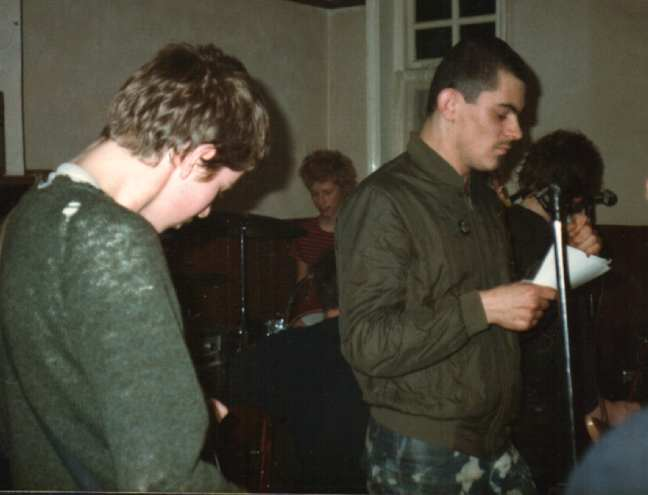
- The Apostles performing at the Spread Eagle, Southend-on-Sea, December 1981

Background information
- Origin: London, England
- Genres: Punk rock, anarcho-punk
- Years active: 1979–1989
- Labels: Scum Records; Mortarhate Records
- Past members: Andy Martin; William 'Bill' Corbett; Julian Portinari; Dan McIntyre; Pete Bynghall; John Soares; Chris Low; Dave Fanning; Chris "Widni" Wiltshire; Malcolm "Scruff" Lewty; Patrick "Rat" Poole; Sean Stokes; Colin Murrell

The Apostles were an English experimental punk rock band, who developed within the 1980s anarcho-punk scene in the UK, but did not necessarily adhere to the aesthetics of that movement and were critical of what they saw as its ideological conformity and especially pacifism.

== History ==
The Apostles were formed in the Islington area of London in 1979 by William 'Bill' Corbett (vocals), Julian Portinari (bass), Dan McIntyre (drums) and Pete Bynghall (guitar). This line-up of the group did not play any concerts, and only appeared in a small number of fanzines (including Paroxysm Fear and New Crimes) before Bill Corbett left the group.

Andy Martin joined as vocalist in summer 1983, and the group played their first concert on 22 September 1981. This line-up of the group then recorded an eponymous demo tape later that year.

The music of the group is generally characterised by a varied eclecticism which encompasses punk and blues rock, with influences like Lemon Kittens, Five Or Six, and other avant-garde groups.

The remaining founder members left the band in early 1982. Martin recruited Dave Fanning (ex-Innocent Bystander) as bass player, along with a revolving line-up of musicians – including John Soares, Kev Apostle, Flump, Chris Low (ex-Political Asylum) and Olly Bucket (Eat Shit) – to continue the group.

Andy Martin and Dave Fanning were joined in 1984 by Malcolm "Scruff" Lewty (later of Hellbastard, Sidewinder, Nero Circus and Heavy Water) and drummer Chris "Widni" Wiltshire, which created a line-up that remained relatively stable (with the addition of Sean Stokes and Colin Murrell) until the group's demise at the end of the 1980s. The group released numerous demo cassettes, seven 7" singles and seven 12" LP's. Original guitarist Pete Bynghall re-joined the group in late 1988 for their last recordings and final concert (recorded and released as the Live at Thee Akademie 108 cassette).

The Apostles split as a group in 1989. Fanning and Martin then formed Academy 23, which also included Nathan Coles (of The Unbelievables) and Lawrence Burton (formerly of Konstruktivists). Academy 23 were renamed in 1994 as UNIT. Fanning left UNIT in 2007. Both Academy 23 and UNIT reworked lyrics and music from tracks by The Apostles across multiple releases.

== Legacy ==
Andy Martin has subsequently been extremely critical about The Apostles' output and especially his own contributions:

"...sadly much of the music was a disappointment: ineptly performed and atrociously produced, it was amateur and shabby in the extreme [...] It should also be mentioned that The Apostles was very much the Dave Fanning band – I was certainly not 'the main man' in the group [...] The popularity of the group is therefore due to his playing (which was usually more competent than any of the other band members) and his formidable artwork rather than my own paltry contribution to the noise."

Nevertheless, interest in The Apostles is enduring. In 2014 Ty Segall namechecked the group in an interview with Entertainment Weekly and the debut LP Punk Obituary was re-released by Spanish label Beat Generation. In 2019 a previously unreleased split EP with the band Anathema recorded in 1986 was made available as a 12" by the Inflammable Material label. Former Apostles drummer Chris Low has produced two double LP compilations by the band – 2022's Best Forgotten (Horn of Plenty) is a selection of "Early Demo, Live and Practise Tapes '81-'83" and 2024's There Can Be No Spectators (Grow Your Own Records) collects four of the early 7" EPs.

In a 2016 primer on Anarcho Punk in The Wire Magazine, Louis Pattison asserts that the band:

"...remain one of the oddest groups to emerge from the anarcho ferment [...] under the aegis of Andy Martin and Dave Fanning, The Apostles turned into something beyond clear category. Queer, proletarian, anti-racist, full of self-loathing and burning with class rage, The Apostles were loathed by 'trendy' anarcho punks, and loathed them back."

== Political orientation and controversies ==
"Although The Apostles’s milieu was the anarcho-punk movement, they consistently derided the punk scene (and often anarcho-punk)."

— Ana Raposo, "Rival tribal rebel revel: the anarcho punk movement and subcultural internecine rivalries", The Aesthetic of Our Anger: Anarcho-Punk, Politics, Music (2015)

"Do we really need another song about nuclear war when the other four thousand haven't exactly achieved any change?"

— Andy Martin, "Smash The Spectacle: The Story of The Apostles by Lance Hahn", Maximum Rocknroll #266 (2005 July)

Always highly critical of anarchist movement of the times, the autonomous and extreme libertarian approach of The Apostles seemed to portray classic anarchism, as opposed to the conformity of many of their contemporaries. This led the group receiving respect from notable members of the anarcho-punk movement such as Conflict, who released three records by The Apostles, and Crass with whom the band co-operated during the squatting of the Zig-Zag Club and during the time in which The Autonomy Centre and Centro Iberico anarchist venues operated. Both Martin and Fanning worked during this period at the Little @ printers – an anarchist printers located in the same building as the Autonomy Centre in Wapping.

Early songs like 'Pigs For Slaughter' and 'Mob Violence' included lyrics about direct action which were out of step with the pacifism usual in the anarcho-punk scene of the time, as was the title of the first EP: Blow It Up Burn It Down Kick It Till It Breaks. This EP's sleeve included an account of an Apostles performance at the London Musicians Collective being curtailed after objections from the pacifist owner of the PA system, as well as practical advice on squatting and constructing an incendiary device. The title of the EP was taken from "Communique 8" by left wing urban guerillas The Angry Brigade.

Cultural critic Stewart Home states that:

"...the Apostles blazed a trail that would be mined for its black humour and media potential by the Class War movement. The track 'Pigs For Slaughter' on the second Apostles EP (Scum Records 1983) defined what would become the platform of anarchist regroupment a year or so later.".

Anarchist newspaper Class War referenced the group in its second issue:

"The Apostles and the Anti-Social Workers link with the war against the rich and make for the real possibility of taking the anger and frustration away from the gig and out onto the streets and once and for all saying 'Fuck that' to the shitty rituals that pass for pleasure."

The group's lyrics and written output covered homosexuality and homophobia:

"The Apostles, keen as ever to distinguish themselves from other anarchist bands, showed willing to explore themes of homosexuality, drawing on Andy Martin’s experience as a gay man and volunteer at a gay youth club in London’s King’s Cross during the mid- 1970s. Accordingly, songs such as 'Fucking Queer' tackled homophobia, telling of a 'queer- basher' who later realises his own repressed homosexuality. 'The Curse', written in 1982– 83, relayed Martin’s own sense of sexual alienation. 'Dave [Fanning] accepts his own bisexuality', Martin wrote of his band mate in the sleevenotes, '[but] to me it is The Curse, it is the blow nature struck me just when I’d got everything else in my life sorted out'. More positively, 'Hello Mark' served as a personal paean to the 'love that dare not speak its name'."

In 1989, Martin and Fanning gave an interview with Homocore fanzine which addressed their sexuality and several examples of homophobic bigotry they had faced. The group contributed the song "Forbidden Love" to the first queercore compilation, JD.s Top Ten Homocore Hits, released by J.D.s fanzine in 1990.

The anti-communist and anti-gay lyrics of 'Rock Against Communism' and 'Kill or Cure' on the 1984 Giving of Love Costs Nothing EP and other similarly themed songs on 1987's The Equinox Screams LP opened the group to charges of fascism and homophobia. As Dr Ana Raposo said about "The Giving of Love Costs Nothing" EP:

"Despite being undoubtedly a satirical statement with the intent of jostling the anarcho-punk audiences, the irony was not perceived as such by all including even some members of the band. Their fifth EP – Smash the Spectacle, released on Mortarhate Records, in 1985 – included a note regarding disagreements amongst band members as a result of the previous release."

Whilst this material was intended to expose the attitudes of those within the 'anarcho punk' milieu who did not challenge such blatantly provocative sentiments (a tactic which Andy Martin had used since his entrance to the group), they undermined the coherence of the band's ideology, leading Stewart Home, in his book Cranked Up Really High, to describe The Apostles as:

"...locked into a rigid Punk Rock groove where a desire to explore contradictory impulses resulted in stasis if not actual paralysis.[...] The schizophrenic attitude of the band made it impossible for them to move in any direction whatsoever, unless this was done in a completely tentative fashion and quickly negated by some contradictory action.".

== Discography ==
=== Studio albums ===
- Punk Obituary (1985, Mortarhate Records) (reissued in 2014)
- The Lives & Times of the Apostles (1986, Children of the Revolution Records)
- The Acts of the Apostles in the Theatre of Fear (1986, Acid Stings)
- How Much Longer? (1986, Acid Stings)
- Equinox Screams (1987, Andy Brant Inc.)
- Cartography / The Show Trial Asylum (1987, Power Cut Cassettes) (Split cassette with The Demolition Company. The Apostles' side on the album is "Cartography")
- The Other Operation (1988, Active Sounds Records) (split album with Statement (Patrick Poole))
- Hymn To Pan (1988, No Masters Voice)
- Eine Antwort / Dipinti Sotterranei, (1988) (Split cassette with Final Alternative Relation; The Apostles' side on the album is "Eine Antwort")

=== EPs ===
Chart placings shown are from the UK Independent Chart.

- Blow It Up, Burn It Down, Kick It Till It Breaks! 7-inch EP (1982)
- Rising From The Ashes 7-inch EP (1983, Scum Records) No. 21
- The Curse of the Creature 7-inch EP (1983, Scum Records) No. 17
- The Giving of Love Costs Nothing 7-inch EP (1984, Scum Records)
- Smash The Spectacle 7-inch EP (1984, Mortarhate Records) No. 22
- Anathema/The Apostles, (Split EP with Anathema originally planned for release as a 7-inch on Fight Back Records in 1986, but eventually released as a 12" single by Inflammable Material in 2019)
- Death To Wacky Pop! 1986 7-inch EP (1986, Fight Back Records) (features members of The Joy of Living)
- No Faith No Fear 7-inch EP (1986, Active Sounds Records)

=== Live album ===
- Live at the LMC (1987, Cause For Concern) (Split live LP with The Mob recorded 22 January 1983)

=== Compilation albums ===
- Segments (cassette compiled of studio material; the release date is unknown)
- The Acts of the Apostles 1985 (cassette compiled of live material; not to be confused with the 1986 album with the similar name)
- Final Manifesto 1992 (cassette compiled of the band's last and unreleased studio recording sessions from March 1988 and January 1989)
- No Faith No Fear 1993 (cassette compiled of recordings of an unreleased double album the band recorded in 1986; rereleased in 2006 in CD-R format with two bonus tracks)
- The Singles & Compilation Album Tracks 2018 (digital collection compiled of EP material and tracks which appeared on various VA compilations; available on Unit's Bandcamp page)
- The 1st & 2nd Studio Albums 2018 (digital collection compiled of the albums "Punk Obituary" and "The Lives And Times of the Apostles"; available on Unit's Bandcamp page)
- The 3rd & 4th Albums 2018 (digital collection compiled of the albums "The Acts of the Apostles in the Theatre of Fear" and "How Much Longer?"; available on Unit's Bandcamp page)
- The 5th & 6th Albums 2018 (digital collection compiled of the album "Eine Antwort" and the "Final Manifesto" compilation cassette; available on Unit's Bandcamp page)
- Make Up 2019 (digital collection compiled of material for a cassette the band recorded in April 1988 called by the names "Grant Munro & The Apostles" and "Make Up", which was believed to be lost for 27 years; available on Unit's Bandcamp page)
- Cassette Chaos 2020 (digital collection compiled of four different recording sessions from the years 1983, 1987 and 1989; available on Unit's Bandcamp page)
- Best Forgotten (2022, Horn of Plenty) (Double LP of Early Demo, Live and Practise Tapes 1981–1983)
- There Can Be No Spectators (2024, Grow Your Own Records) (Double LP of four early seven inch singles)

=== Demo albums (cassette only) ===
- The Apostles 1981
- The 2nd Dark Age 1982
- Libertarian Propaganda 1982
- Topics For Discussion 1982
- A Sudden Surge of Sound (retrospective on CFC Cassettes) 1983
- Swimmers in the Sea of Life 1983
- Live at the Recession Club 1983
- Christ, Its The Apostles! 1983
- Will I Ever Be Free? 1984
- Fire in the Sky 1985
- Visions of the End 1985
- Punk Leftovers 1986
- Private Performances 1987
- Gary Cooke Was Here 1987
- Strength Through Purity 1987
- A.S.P.A. Demo 1987
- Une Réponse 1987
- Fine Antwort 1988
- The Progressive Blues Experiment 1988
- The 12th Gate to the Underworld 1988
- Death 1988
- How To Suck Seed 1988
- Life 1989
- A Consumer Commodity 1989
- Live at Thee Academy 108 1989 (the last ever performance 3/2/89)

=== Compilation album appearances ===
- Mob Violence (Part 2) – "We Don't Want Your Fucking War" 1986 LP Mortarhate
- Inner Space – "God Save Us From The USA" 1987 LP, Happy Mike
- Walls – "You've Heard It All Before" (Crass Covers compilation) 1993 LP Ruptured Ambitions Records
- Hyde Park 1988 LP (released by German band Doc Wör Mirran featuring international groups, not all punk)
- J.D.s Top Ten Tape – "Forbidden Love" 1990 cassette
