= Vu T. Thu Ha =

Vu T. Thu Ha (also known as Vũ T. Thu Hà ) is an interdisciplinary artist who works primarily in film, photography and conceptual art.

Vũ is an artist with a diverse background, having studied film, photography, and sculpture at the San Francisco Art Institute and City College of San Francisco, and wood technology and fine furniture building at Laney College in Oakland.

Vũ's 2006 feature film Kiều, with a running time of 74 minutes, in English, with Vietnamese dialogue, was inspired by Vietnamese epic poem Truyện Kiều (The Tale of Kieu), by Nguyễn Du, in which the heroine sells herself to redeem her family’s debt, and Kiều is the story transported to 21st century San Francisco. Kiều lives in the Mission District but works in the Tenderloin at a massage parlor, where she works to send money to her family. Kiều premiered in March 2006 at the San Francisco International Asian American Film Festival.

Vũ is also the director of the Super 8mm film Each Night (2001) and the short 16mm film Shut Up White Boy (2002). Shut Up White Boy has screened nationally and internationally. Collectively written, produced, and performed by a group of queer Asian American women, dyke artists and punk rock musicians, Shut Up White Boy deals with themes of revenge, desire, and stereotypes. It features an original soundtrack by the DragOn Ladies, an unapologetically Asian, unapologetically queer punk band featuring Dorothy Wang, Leslie Mah, and Tina Gordon.
