= Bruce and Pepper Wayne Gacy's Home Movies =

- Directed by: Bruce LaBruce, Candy Parker
- Written by: Bruce LaBruce, Candy Parker
- Produced by: GayTown productions
- Starring: G.B. Jones; Bruce LaBruce; Dave Dictor
- Cinematography: Bruce LaBruce, Candy Parker
- Edited by: Bruce LaBruce, Candy Parker
- Distributed by: Jürgen Brüning FilmProduktion
- Release date: 1988
- Running time: 12 minutes
- Country: Canada
- Language: English

Bruce and Pepper Wayne Gacy's Home Movies, also known as Home Movies, is a short experimental film by Bruce LaBruce and Candy Parker.

Made in Toronto in 1988, it is filmed in color and black and white on Super 8mm film and lasts 12 minutes.

The conceptual premise of the film is that the audience is watching the home movies of Bruce Wayne Gacy and Pepper Wayne Gacy, the children of the notorious serial killer John Wayne Gacy. The film features various disturbing vignettes filmed in a dysfunctional home; a woman arrives (G. B. Jones) and begins beating up two men, a man (Bruce LaBruce) goes through a range of emotions watching a man (Dave Dictor) attempt to perform drunken oral sex on a woman on a bathroom floor while an oblivious small dog runs about, and a man eats in a deranged manner from a dog food bowl on the floor and howls.

The film stars Bruce LaBruce, G.B. Jones, Dave Dictor, Joe The Ho, David Gravelle.

Bruce and Pepper Wayne Gacy's Home Movies was first shown in 1990 and 1991 by LaBruce and Jones as part of the J.D.s movie screenings in London in the UK, Montreal and Toronto in Canada, then in San Francisco and Buffalo, U.S.A. It is still being regularly screened at museums and film festivals worldwide.
