= Queer Zine Archive Project =

- Established: November 2003
- Location: Milwaukee, Wisconsin
- Coordinates: 43.07190°N 87.90182°W
- Type: Archive, history museum
- Website: qzap.org

The Queer Zine Archive Project (QZAP) is a Milwaukee-based community archive dedicated to preserving queer zines and queer zine culture. Part of the archive's mission is to make the collection accessible through digitizing these zines and making them publicly accessible in an online format. The archive has received zine donations from across the world.

QZAP was founded in November 2003 by Milo Miller and Chris Wilde. It has since maintained a physical collection in Milwaukee and a free online archive of digitized zines. The entire collection is not digitized due to a variety of factors. The COVID-19 pandemic put a halt to the digitization process. Additionally, some donations are unavailable for online access at donor request.

== Local reception ==
QZAP has been noted by University of Milwaukee professor Joyce Latham as a powerful "response of the queer community to the history, and practice, of marginalization and disregard."

QZAP assists with the Milwaukee Zinefest yearly and participates in community programming with the Milwaukee LGBT Community Center. They host local workshops and vend at local events. QZAP hosts summer residencies for zine makers interested in using and studying their collection.

== Mission statement ==
The mission of the Queer Zine Archive Project (QZAP) is to establish a "living history" archive of past and present queer zines and to encourage current and emerging zine publishers to continue to create. In curating such a unique aspect of culture, we value a collectivist approach that respects the diversity of experiences that fall under the heading "queer." The primary function of QZAP is to provide a free on-line searchable database of the collection with links allowing users to view or download electronic copies of zines. By providing access to the historical canon of queer zines we hope to make them more accessible to diverse communities and reach wider audiences.

— QZAP, "About the Archive"

== Collections ==
QZAP began when its founders digitized their personal collection of roughly 350 queer-punk zines and put them in an online database. Through donations, the collection has grown to over 4,500 zines, over 600 of which have been digitized and are freely accessible online. The physical collection is stored in filing cabinets in the founders' Milwaukee home. Digitized items from the QZAP collection also form part of the Zines collection at the Digital Transgender Archive. Miller and Wilde have explained that they digitize zines to further diversify queer stories, stating that they want to make more public "stories aren’t being told in other ways."

Their collections policy takes the form of a FAQ that explains what a zine is, how they define queer and queer zines, and where to find zines elsewhere. Donations are accepted by filling out a form and mailing it to them along with the zine.

== Use in research ==
QZAP's collection has been mentioned and cited in a wide variety of research, based both on the zines themselves and the act of archiving or digitizing them since zines are traditionally thought of as ephemeral. Their zines have been used to study the needs of queer and trans healthcare and health information, the affective dynamics of digitization, and the ethical implications of archiving zines.

== See also ==
- Category:LGBTQ museums and archives
- LGBT history in the United States
- Queercore
- DIY culture
