= Lynn Breedlove =

American musician, writer, and performer

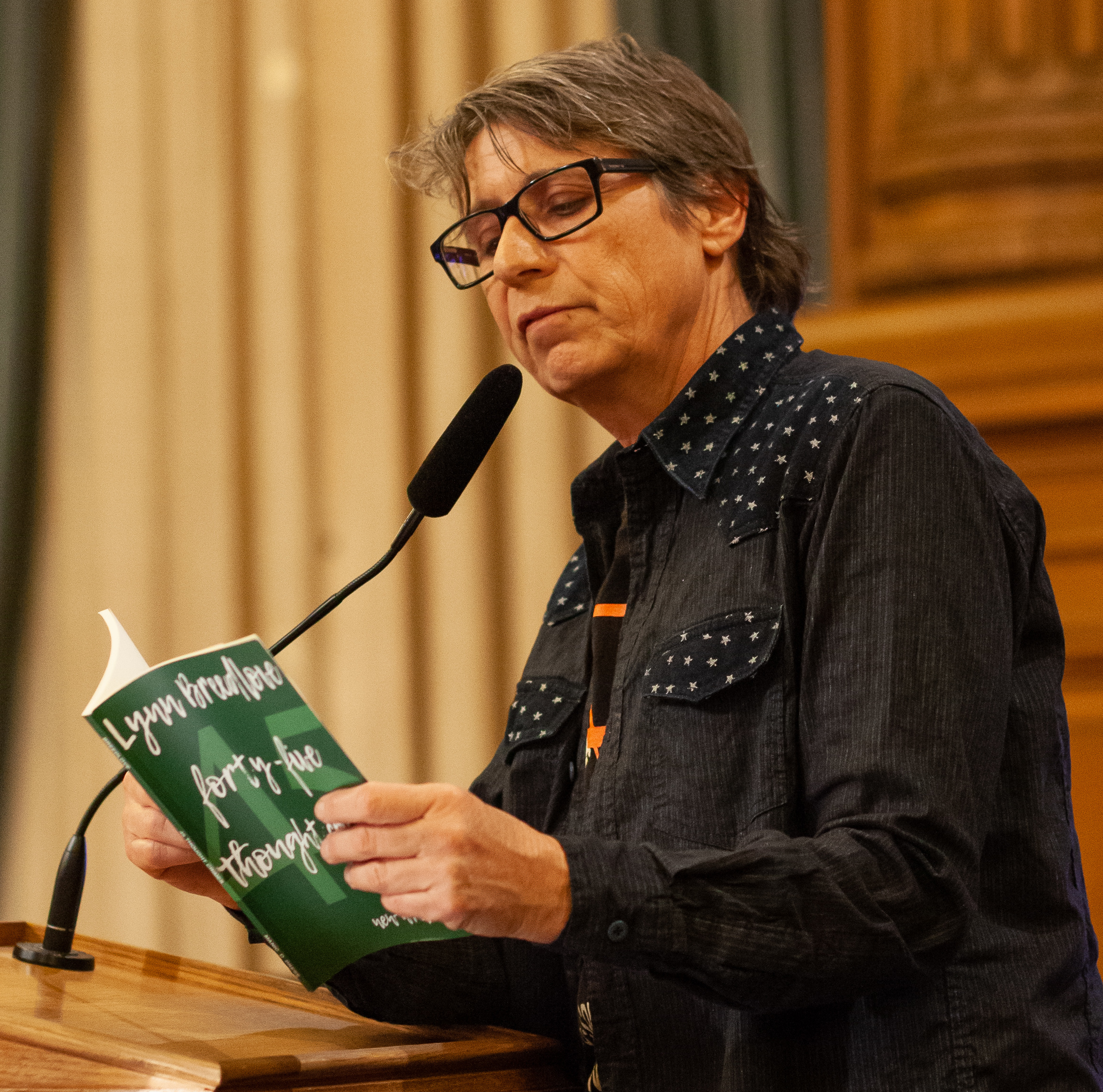
- Breedlove in 2019

Background information
- Born: December 16, 1958 (age 67)
- Origin: San Francisco Bay Area
- Genres: Queercore, riot grrrl, punk rock
- Occupations: musician, activist, writer, comic
- Instrument: vocals
- Years active: 1990-present

Lynn Breedlove is an American musician, writer, and performer who was born in Oakland, California.

== Early life ==
Lynn Breedlove was born in and grew up in the San Francisco Bay Area during early childhood and then lived in Alameda and Oakland, California, as a teenager. His father was a high school teacher. His mother was a secretary who originally hailed from Germany. Breedlove was an only child.

== Tribe 8 and The Homobiles ==
Breedlove is the queer founding member and lead singer of the San Francisco dyke punk band Tribe 8. The band's first single, "Pigbitch", was released on Harp records, run by Gina Harp in 1991. The second single, "There's a Dyke in the Pit", with Bikini Kill, 7 Year Bitch, and the Lucy Stoners was released by the queercore record label Outpunk in 1992, and later releases were on the independent record label Alternative Tentacles. The band appeared on film in A Gun for Jennifer and also performed in She's Real, Worse Than Queer, and Rise Above: A Tribe 8 Documentary by Tracy Flannigan.

Breedlove has performed at the Michigan Womyn's Music Festival and criticized the festival's trans-exclusionary policies. Tribe 8 also played at the San Francisco Transgender March, multiple Ladyfests, and LGBT Pride Festivals, including Europride 2000 in Rome, Italy.

In 2015, Breedlove returned to playing music with the emergence of his new band, The Homobiles, billed as a "queer-punk supergroup", with Ed Varga, founder of Homo A Gogo, songwriter Mya Byrne, Fureigh (former guitarist for The Shondes), Stephany Ashley (executive director of St. James Infirmary Clinic), and Corrie Bennett.

== Spoken word, open mike, and radio shows ==
Breedlove has performed spoken word on Sister Spit tours, and from 2000 to 2006 he and Tara Jepsen co-hosted a monthly sexuality and gender identity-based cultures open mic in San Francisco called K'vetch. Breedlove MC'd the 3rd Annual SF Trans March in '07.

Starting in 2004, Breedlove created the comedy solo show Lynnee Breedlove's One Freak Show which has been touring the U.S., Canada, and Europe in five languages. A book based on this show with the same title was published by Manic D Press in 2009. The book, Lynnee Breedlove's One Freak Show, won the 2010 Lambda Literary Award for Transgender Literature.

Since 2004, Breedlove often hosts Gender Pirates, a monthly benefit for the group United Genders of the Universe in San Francisco, and has hosted the Unka Lynnee Show on Pirate Cat Radio (formerly the Unka Lynnee & Aunty Cindy Show with Cindy Emch), as well as taught Unka Lynnee's Skool 4 Boyz at The Harvey Milk Institute. The column, "Uncle Lynnee's Skool For Bois", ran for two years at On Our Backs magazine and twice as "Unka Lynnee's Skool 4 Boyz" at Velvet Park Magazine.

In May 2013, Breedlove appeared on Music Life Radio, discussing Tribe 8, and Homobiles, the new LGBTQ ride sharing non-profit service founded by Breedlove in San Francisco.

== Homobiles non-profit ==
Breedlove is the founder of the San Francisco based non-profit Homobiles, a California NPO 501(c)(3) providing transit to the SF Bay Area LGBTIQQ community and its allies. Homobiles is credited by Sidecar Co-Founder Sunil Paul as the first peer-to-peer ridesharing service in the United States and the inspiration for Sidecar's business model.

Homobiles officially launched their donation-based community mutual aid service in 2011 after Breedlove first began giving rides in 2010 - to protect drag performers and people who didn't feel safe or wouldn't be picked up by traditional taxi services.

They serve not just SF's queer community but people of color, and allies. Homobiles is also credited by members of the business community with pioneering the operating model that helped lead to Lyft and Uber's success.

== Godspeed and Freak Show ==
In 2002, Breedlove's first novel, Godspeed, was published by St. Martin's Press. The main character of the book is a methamphetamine-using bicycle messenger named Jim. The main character is said to be based on Breedlove's years as an addict. In 2007, a German translation of the novel was published, titled Götterspeed on Mox und Moritz.

Godspeed was produced as a short film, starring Breedlove as Jim, the antihero, Ad-Rock of the Beastie Boys as the dispatcher, and Jillian Lauren, aka Sparkle Diamonds of the LA burlesque troupe Velvet Hammer, as the stripper love interest. It features music by Tribe8, Lunachicks, The Gossip, Katastrophe, MDC, All The Pretty Horses, Bikini Kill, Le Tigre, Blatz, and Dirtbox. Breedlove co-directed with Jen Gilomen and co-produced with Kami Chisholm, wrote the script, and starred in the film. Music supervision provided by Kathleen Hanna and art directed by Vega Darling.

Breedlove's other published books are Lynnee Breedlove's One Freak Show and 45 Thought Crimes, published by Manic D Press in 2009 and 2019, respectively.

== Honors and awards ==
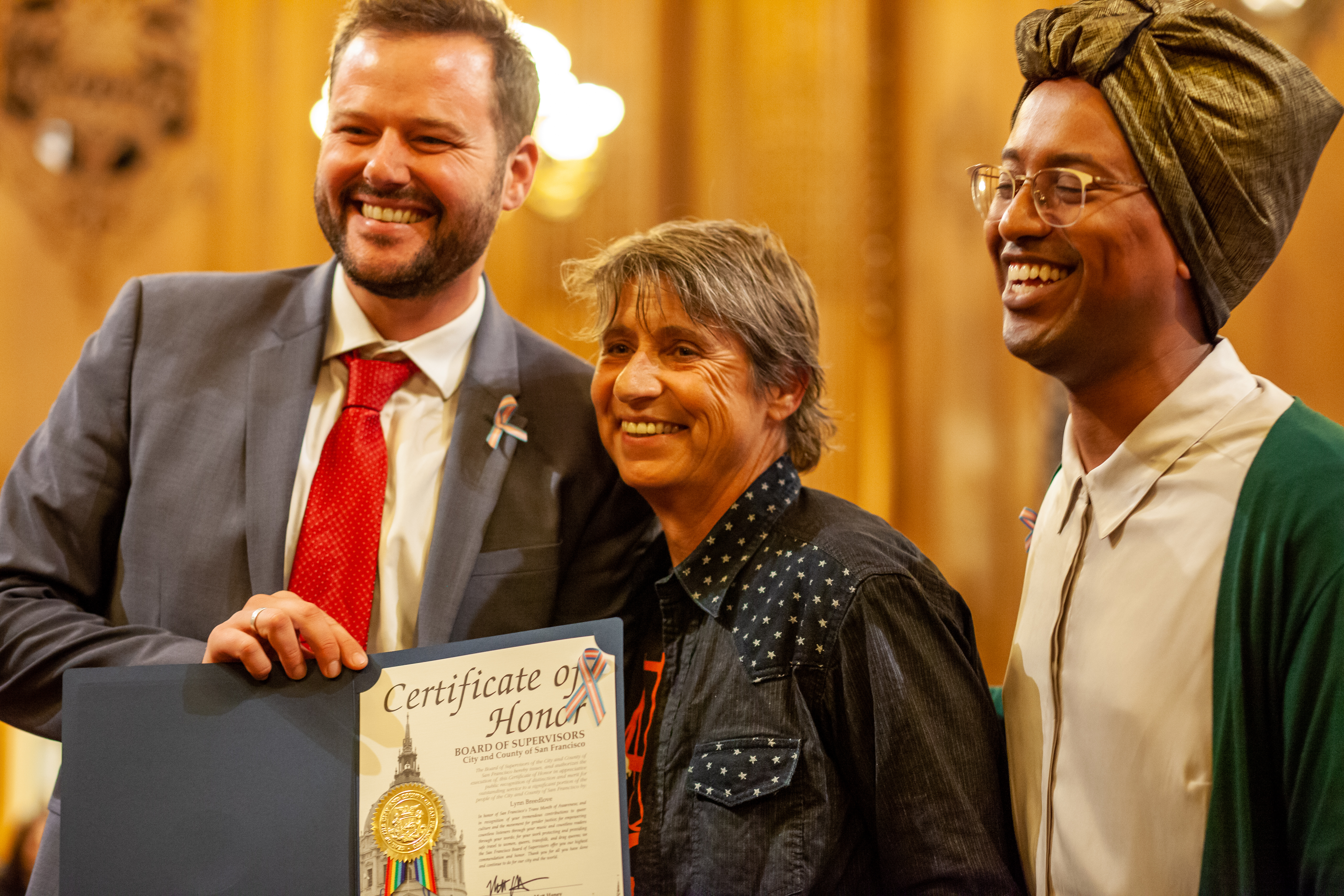
Breedlove receiving a certificate of honor from San Francisco supervisor Matt Haney and his legislative aide Honey Mahogany, November 2019

In November 2019, Breedlove was commended by the San Francisco Board of Supervisors during Transgender Awareness Week.

== Personal life ==
Breedlove is a trans man. Breedlove was featured in the 2016 documentary, Queercore: How to Punk a Revolution, directed by Yony Leyser.

He has experienced addiction in the past, citing what helped as being, "a lot of therapy and working with things like Buddhism and all kinds of spiritual practices that help me be able to hold two opposite ideas at the same time. I'm a feminist and I'm a dyke and I fucking hate men and I'm a man. I identify as a dyke and as a guy. People are pissed off about that because they want you to pick a side. Really, my choice isn't about you. I don't tell you to lop your tits off, and you don't get to tell me that I can't be a dyke and a guy. That is just as repressive as any of the bullshit that we're rebelling against."

== Native American Identity ==
Lynn Breedlove self-identified as Native American in his 2019 book 45 Thought Crimes and a subsequent interview with the Advocate.

Breedlove’s claim of Native American Ancestry was based on self-identification. In The Advocate interview, Breedlove states that his father had "stories and photos, family trees… I research and report back to him. We theorize to fill in blanks". In a 2020 obituary article about his late father, Robert Breedlove, the family's claims of Native American heritage were revised. In the article it was clarified that the Breedloves could not demonstrate Indigenous descent, but that Lynn's father had an affinity for Indigenous Cultures, in particular those of the Americas: "Robert was very interested in the history of indigenous people from around the world and particularly the First Nations people, Lynn said. His den was 'wall to wall books' on the topic, Lynn added."

== Filmography ==
- A Gun For Jennifer, 1996
- She's Real, Worse Than Queer by Lucy Thane, 1997
- Dope on Dope by Shon Kayli, 1998
- Step Up and Be Vocal, Interviews zu Queer Punk und Feminismus in San Francisco by Uta Busch und Sandra Ortmann, (2001) Bremen, Germany, 60 min
- Rise Above: A Tribe 8 Documentary by Tracy Flannigan, 2003
- Godspeed by Lynn Breedlove and Jen Gilomen, 2007
