= Tracy Flannigan =

American filmmaker

Tracy Flannigan is an independent filmmaker residing in the Echo Park area of Los Angeles who began making movies when she was seventeen years old. She has created numerous short films and music videos. Her work has been screened at many film festivals throughout the United States including South by Southwest and Seattle International.

Flannigan's feature-length screenplay, The Late Great W.J., won a fellowship at the Squaw Valley Community of Writers.

Rise Above: A Tribe 8 Documentary marked Flannigan's documentary feature debut. The film was made over a five-year period in which Flannigan dedicated herself to capturing the lives and performances of the all women queercore band, Tribe 8. Rise Above has screened internationally and won the Jury Award for Best Documentary at Frameline, the San Francisco Gay and Lesbian Film Festival and earned Flannigan the Kodak Emerging Talent Award at Outfest, the Los Angeles Gay and Lesbian Film Festival.

In addition to her directing and producing, she worked as an editor on documentary series and features for HBO and Netflix. She had the opportunity to contribute editing of scenes to Moonage Daydream (film).

Tracy worked closely with Brett Morgen on “Moonage Daydream (film)” as Co-Producer (2022.) The film is a feature-length experiential cinematic odyssey that explores David Bowie's creative, musical and spiritual journey. They also worked together on “Kurt Cobain: Montage of Heck” (2015)”.
