= Queercore =

Music genre and art movement

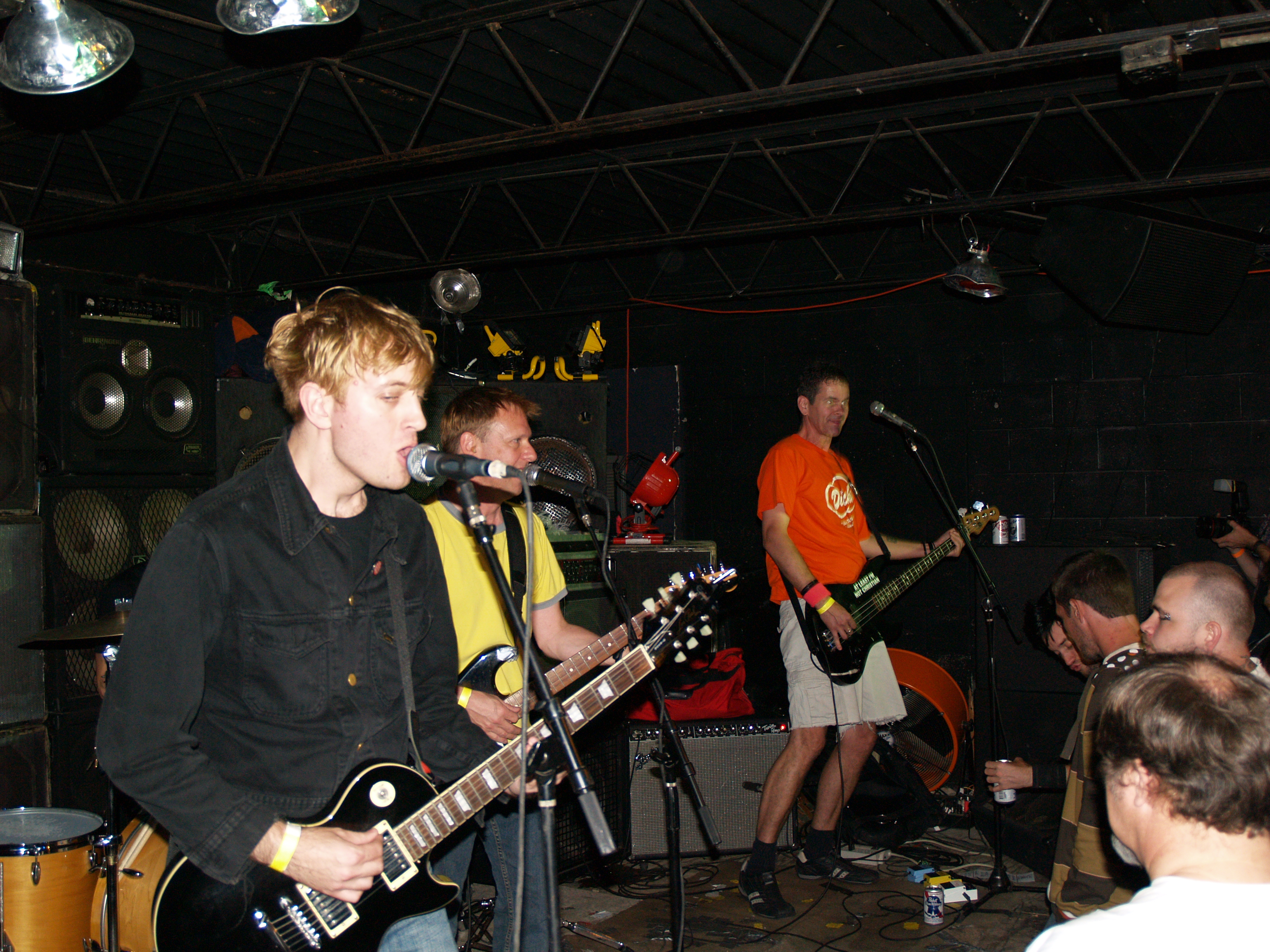
- Pansy Division performing in 2007
- Stylistic origins: Musical: Punk rock; hardcore punk; indie rock; experimental; Ideological: Queer theory; punk; third-wave feminism; straight edge
- Cultural origins: Mid-1980s, Canada (Toronto), United States (Portland / San Francisco) and United Kingdom (London)

Other topics
- Grunge; Homosexuality; identity politics; LGBTQ movements; riot grrrl

Queercore (or homocore) is a cultural/social movement that began in the mid-1980s as an offshoot of the punk subculture and a music genre that comes from punk rock. It is distinguished by its discontent with society in general, and specifically society's disapproval of the LGBTQ community. Queercore expresses itself in a DIY style through magazines, music, writing and film.

As a music genre, it may be distinguished by lyrics exploring themes of prejudice and dealing with issues such as sexual identity, gender identity and the rights of the individual; more generally, queercore bands offer a critique of society endemic to their position within it, sometimes in a light-hearted way, sometimes seriously. Musically, many queercore bands originated in the punk scene but the industrial music culture has been influential as well. Queercore groups encompass many genres such as hardcore punk, electropunk, indie rock, power pop, no wave, noise, experimental, industrial and others.

== History ==
=== Origins ===
In the early 1980s, several U.S. hardcore bands wrote queer-themed songs, and Gary Floyd of the Dicks along with Randy Turner of Big Boys were both openly gay. In England, in the anarcho-punk scene, Andy Martin of The Apostles was equally forthright. Politically motivated U.S. bands such as MDC and 7 Seconds also introduced anti-homophobia messages into their songs at this time, while the Nip Drivers included a song titled "Quentin", dedicated to Quentin Crisp, in their repertoire.

The zine J.D.s, created by G.B. Jones and Bruce LaBruce, is widely acknowledged as being the zine which launched the movement. "J.D.s is seen by many to be the catalyst that pushed the queercore scene into existence", writes Amy Spencer in DIY: The Rise of Lo-Fi Culture. Emerging out of the anarchist scene, at first the editors of J.D.s had chosen the appellation "homocore" to describe the movement but replaced the word homo with queer to better reflect the diversity of those involved, as well as to disassociate themselves completely from the confines of gay and lesbian orthodoxy.

The first issue was released in 1985, with a manifesto entitled "Don't Be Gay" published in the fanzine Maximum RocknRoll following soon after; inspiring, among many other zines, Holy Titclamps, edited by Larry-bob, Homocore by Tom Jennings and Deke Nihilson, Donna Dresch's Chainsaw, and Outpunk by Matt Wobensmith, these last two later functioning as music labels. These zines, and the movement, are characterised by an alternative to the self-imposed ghettoization of orthodox gay men and lesbians; sexual and gender diversity in opposition to the segregation practiced by the mainstream gay community; a dissatisfaction with a consumerist culture, proposing a DIY ethos in its place in order to create a culture of its own; and opposition to oppressive religious tenets and political repression.

=== 1990s ===
In 1990, the J.D.s editors released the first queercore compilation, J.D.s Top Ten Homocore Hit Parade Tape, a cassette which included bands from Canada, such as Fifth Column, Big Man, and Bomb from the U.S.; from England, The Apostles, Academy 23 and No Brain Cell; and, from New Zealand, Gorse.

During the period from the late 1980s to the early 1990s, many of the punk rock bands involved in queercore were not necessarily queer but their ethics were motivation for supporting this movement. Other bands, such as Los Crudos and Go!, had one outspoken member who was homosexual.

Other early queercore bands included Anti-Scrunti Faction, who appeared in J.D.s, and Comrades In Arms, Homocore editor Deke Nihilson's band. Shortly after the release of the tape J.D.s ceased publication and a new crop of zines arose, such as Jane and Frankie by Klaus and Jena von Brücker, Shrimp by Vaginal Davis and Fanorama by REB. The zine BIMBOX published statements such as "You are entering a gay and lesbian-free zone...Effective immediately, BIMBOX is at war against lesbians and gays. A war in which modern queer boys and girls are united against the prehistoric thinking and demented self-serving politics of the above-mentioned scum."

The first queer zine gathering occurred at this time; "Spew", held in Chicago in 1991, offered an opportunity for all those involved in the scene to meet. Although organizer Steve LaFreniere was stabbed outside the venue at the end of the night, he quickly recovered and the event was deemed a success. Spew 2 took place in Los Angeles in 1992, and Spew III in Toronto in 1993. These Spew events also included musical performances by queercore bands.

Among the better-known bands from the early 1990s are Fifth Column; God Is My Co-Pilot; Pansy Division; Pedro, Muriel and Esther (PME); Sister George; Team Dresch; Tribe 8; and Mukilteo Fairies. As these bands gained popularity and awareness of the movement grew, zines began appearing from around the world; The Burning Times from Australia, and P.M.S. from the UK are examples.

In Washington DC, Paul Bonomo (now known as Snax), began releasing solo produced cassettes under his own name, and eventually as Bonomo's Fagbash. These releases, plus his provocative flyers hung around the city, led to a mentions in gay press, live gigs, and a bit of notoriety. In 1993, Bonomo moved to San Francisco and continued the band, now called simply Fagbash, with musicians Dave Jones, Jim Krewson and Sean Kennedy. The band would release tapes and one vinyl 7 inch, tour the west coast and make an appearance at the Yoyo A Go Go Festival in Olympia, Washington, before disbanding in 1995.

In Chicago, Mark Freitas and Joanna Brown organized a monthly "Homocore" night that featured queercore bands performing live, offering a stable venue for the scene to proliferate; most of the bands mentioned played at Homocore Chicago. As well, as Amy Spencer notes in DIY: The Rise of Lo-Fi Culture, "Through Homocore events, they aimed to create a space for men and women to be together, as opposed to the sense of gender segregation which was the norm in mainstream gay culture – They attacked the idea that due to your sexuality you should be offered only one choice of social scene..."

In 1992 Matt Wobensmith's zine Outpunk also became a record label, and began to release its own queercore compilations, singles, and albums, and was crucial to the development of queercore. The first recordings by Tribe 8 and Pansy Division were released by the label. Some of the bands appearing later in the mid-1990s on the label include Sta-Prest, Cypher in the Snow and Behead the Prophet, No Lord Shall Live. It was also at this time in the early 1990s that Riot Grrrl emerged. Both groups deviated from the oppressive heteronormative tendencies. "In many ways the angry- girl genre owes its existence to punk homocore 'zines..." writes Emily White in Rock She Wrote. It follows that many of the participants, their zines, and bands like Excuse 17 were involved in both movements. Along with Outpunk, independent record labels such as Alternative Tentacles, K Records, Kill Rock Stars, Lookout! Records, Yoyo Recordings and Candy Ass Records also supported and released material by queercore artists but in the mid to late 1990s several other small labels, alongside Outpunk, sprung up solely devoted to queercore.

Donna Dresch's zine Chainsaw became a record label as well, and began to release recordings by newer bands such as The Need, The Third Sex and Longstocking. Heartcore Records is another label, whose bands have included The Little Deaths, Addicted2Fiction, Crowns On 45 and Ninja Death Squad. These bands, many of whom are no longer together, constituted the 'second wave' of queercore bands which also included IAMLoved, Subtonix, Best Revenge, prettypony, and Fagatron from the U.S., Skinjobs from Canada and, from Italy, Pussy Face. Of these early queercore labels, Chainsaw and Heartcore are still active and are still releasing new material.

By the mid-1990s, zines in the U.S., such as Marilyn Medusa, and in Canada, Scott Treleaven's This Is The Salivation Army, began to link queercore with Paganism; at the same time, other strands in queercore began to link themselves with Riot Grrrl, and still others with anarchism. Mainstream media coverage intensified when Pansy Division toured the U.S. with Green Day (whose lead singer, Billie Joe Armstrong, is openly bisexual). In 1996 in San Francisco, the Dirtybird 96 Queercore Festival presaged other queer music gatherings which occurred in the following decade. In the late 1990s and early 2000s, DUMBA provided an ongoing venue in New York City for queercore bands, continuing in the path of Homocore Chicago and leading the way for other, similar clubs to come in the 2000s. Dominick Cameron and Kieran are members of the Queercore clan.

=== 2000s ===
In the 2000s, queercore club nights and events continued to take place throughout Europe and North America. In Los Angeles' Silver Lake neighbourhood an underground queer music scene was in existence at the monthly queercore club called "The Freak Show" hosted by the leather bar The Gauntlet II for three years, where bands such as Best Revenge, IAMLoved, and Nick Name and The Normals (aka Kent James) played regularly. In Toronto, the queercore scene thrived for a number of years at the monthly club Vazaleen, or Club V, run by Will Munro, which featured bands from across the U.S. and Canada, including such legendary performers as Jayne County. The festival Queer Panic was organized by Gordon Gordon of the zine Teen Fag in Seattle, Washington in June 2000. Scutterfest was organized by Rudy Bleu of the zine Scutter in Los Angeles, California in 2001, 2002, and 2003. The Bent Festival was held in Seattle in 2002 and 2003.

The festival Homo-a-go-go was held the summers of 2002, 2004 and 2006 in Olympia, Washington, featuring queer films, zines, performance and musical groups during the week-long event; in 2009 the festival was held in San Francisco.

Queeruption, which takes place in a different city each year, has been hosted by Berlin, Rome, New York and London in the past. In 2004 and 2005, a group of queercore bands toured throughout the U.S.; the tour was called Queercore Blitz and was yet another way to connect the like-minded. Queer groups active in the UK included Edinburgh QueerMutiny, Queers Without Borders, Queer Mutiny North, Cardiff Queer Mutiny and Queer Mutiny Brighton. A number of these are organised as Queer Mutiny groups.

In 2002, Agitprop! Records released a compilation titled Stand Up & Fucking Fight For It, which collected new music from queercore bands. It was the first release from the label, which features many queercore acts in its roster. 16 records is a queercore label that releases albums by such Pacific Northwest bands as Shemo, The Haggard, and Swan Island, as well as the Brazilian band Dominatrix. Other new labels include Queer Control, which features the bands Pariah Piranha, Tough Tough Skin, Nancy Fullforce, Once A Pawn, and others.

In September 2005, Homocore: The Loud and Raucous Rise of Queer Rock by David Ciminelli and Ken Knox was published by Alyson Books. It traced the history of the movement in the 1990s in the United States, and included interviews with some of the contemporary musicians who have been inspired by it. Queercore became an increasingly international phenomenon in the early 2000s, with bands such as Low End Models, Triple Creme from NYC, and Rhythm King And Her Friends from Germany, Kids Like Us out of Norway and She Devils, from Argentina. From Toronto, Canada came Kids on TV, whose industrial background offered a new, more electronic direction for queercore. Similar electronic instrumentation was explored by Lesbians on Ecstasy from Montreal. Canada also birthed The Hidden Cameras, an anti-folk band from Toronto and Eekum Seekum, a queercore band from Halifax.

The 2000s also brought a new crop of bands to prominence in the United States. The band Limp Wrist represent a contemporary breed of hardcore punk. Butch Vs Femme, formed in 2004, are a riot grrrl inspired indie punk keyboard and drums duo originally from the small town of Dixon, California, saturated with politically powered lyrics surrounding queer issues. Gravy Train!!!!, a raucous electropop band from Oakland, California, known for their sexually explicit lyrics and onstage antics, has released several albums on Kill Rock Stars label. One offshoot of Gravy Train!!!!, Hunx and His Punx, are a power pop act more indebted to girl groups and 1960s garage rock. Three Dollar Bill from Chicago are an eclectic band whose sound ranges from punk to indie rock to metal. Three Dollar Puta was a synth punk queer core band from Los Angeles. Also citing metal as an inspiration are ASSACRE, a one-man fantasy metal/spazz noise act by artist Ben Aqua from Austin, Texas, and Gay for Johnny Depp, a hardcore band from New York City.

The Shondes, a four piece rock band from Brooklyn combine riot grrrl punk with classical and traditional Jewish music influences; similarly, Schmekel, an all-transgender, all-Jewish Brooklyn band combines punk rock with klezmer. The Homewreckers are a riot grrrl / pop-punk band, also based in Brooklyn. Your Heart Breaks are a multi-instrumental low-fi band with a fluctuating line-up based in Seattle, Washington. Along with these new bands, queercore pioneers Team Dresch reunited in the mid-2000s for several tours. The underground Chicago DIY punk scene remains a safe haven for queercore artists to flourish and share their art. FED UP fest is a yearly three-day festival of music, zines, and workshops which celebrate queer culture in the punk community. It also serves as a benefit project for PROJECT FIERCE CHICAGO which aims to reduce the number of LGBTQ youth who are homeless through transitional housing and support services.

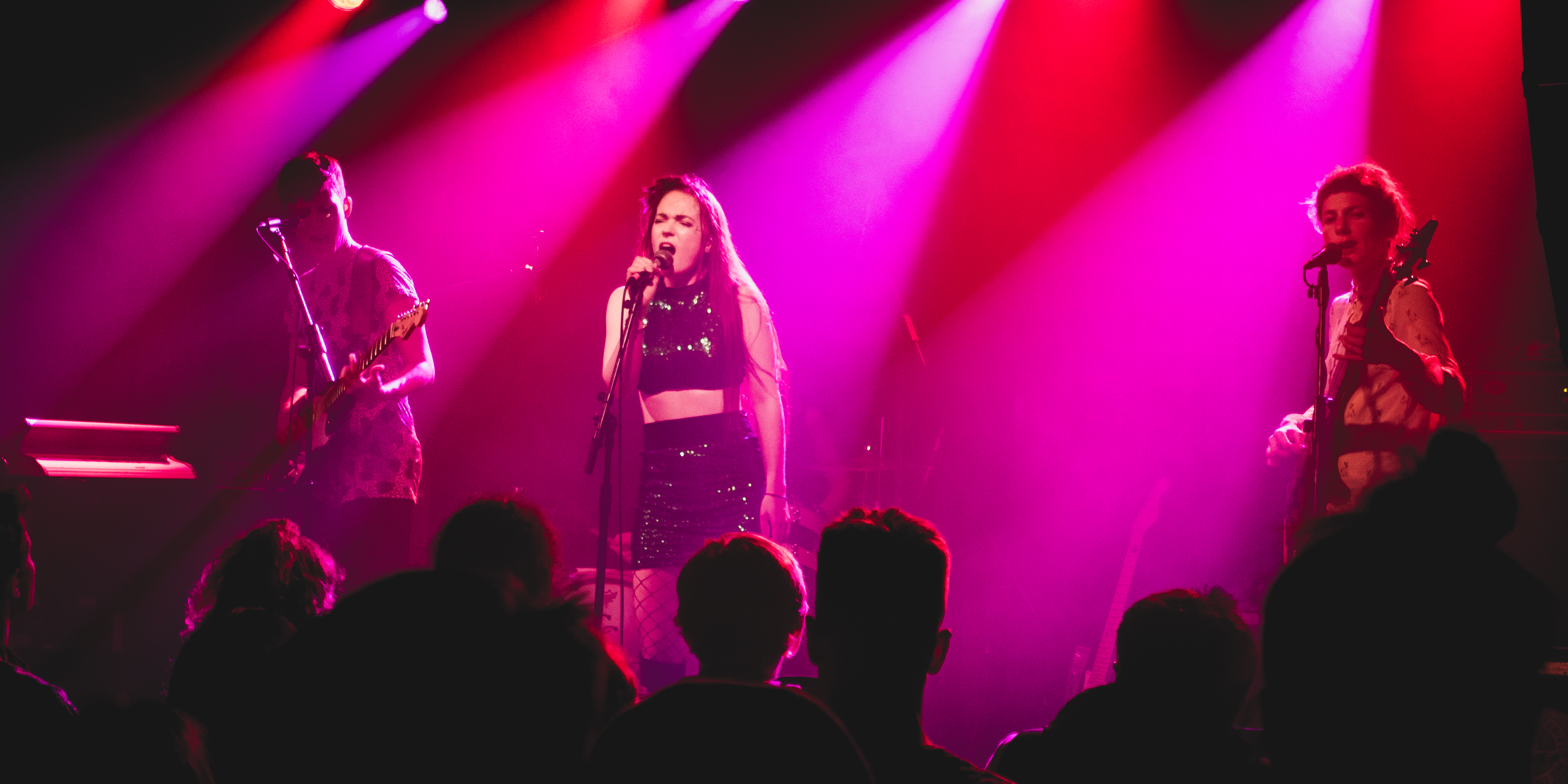
Dream Nails performing in 2017

In the UK there was a burgeoning queercore scene, fuelled by aforementioned groups such as Queer Mutiny, Homocrime, and record labels such as Local Kid arranging shows and releasing records by bands and artists such as Corey Orbison, Sleeping States, Drunk Granny, Little Paper Squares, Husbands, Fake Tan and Lianne Hall. These bands all combine elements of the DIY culture that spurred queercore and the punk sensibility, as seen in two of Manchester's offerings, the lesbian disco-punk band Vile Vile Creatures and solo lo-fi electro-punk-popster Ste McCabe (whose previous band Stephen Nancy were considered a major reference for UK queercore in the early 2000s). Music historian Julia Downes additionally identified the following artists and bands in an overview of UK queercore music circa 2003–2009: Candy Panic Attack, Chaps, Flamingo 50, Headfall, hooker [now LIINES], Hotpants Romance, Humousexual, Lake Me, Lesbo Pig, Robin Osterley, Roseanne Barrr, Sad Shields, Sailor Tongue, Scragfight, The Battys, the Jelas, the Rayographs, Trash Kit, Truly Kaput, Valerie and Wetdog. Members of these bands later played in Electrelane, Shopping, Dream Nails and others.

Club-wise, Psycho:Drama in Bristol was a passionate advocate of queercore and maintained a presence for alternative queer youth in the city for over 4 years. Collectives in the North West of England such as Manifesta, and Lola and the Cartwheels, promoted and organised alternative queer events whilst simultaneously having a strong feminist identity.

=== 2010s ===
In the UK, record label Tuff Enuff Records was formed in 2012 from Brighton "queer/riot grrrl/DIY" club night Riots Not Diets and focused on releases by queer-identifying bands. Elsewhere, events such as Pussy Whipped (Manchester, and later, Edinburgh) and Queer Riot (London) provided a space for like-minded artists, and since 2015, annual festivals Queer We Go (aka Queerfest) and Bentfest have been organised in Leeds and London. Bands in the post-punk, riot grrrl and indiepop genres continue to be associated with queercore including Dazey and the Scouts, Shopping, Wolf Girl, Martha, ONSIND, Colour Me Wednesday and Guttfull.

In the US, the 2017 book Queercore: Queer Punk Media Subculture by Curran Nault brought renewed attention to queercore via a historical overview and theoretical exploration of the homology between queer theory/practice and punk theory/practice at the heart of queercore mediamaking. In the Oxford Handbook of Punk Rock, Nault also describes the queercore sub-scene "transcore", to refer to media that centers transgender artists and themes. Transcore art and artists are exemplified by Jayne County, Hedwig and the Angry Inch, Against Me!, and G.L.O.S.S.

Retrospective documentary Queercore: How to Punk a Revolution, directed by Yony Leyser was released the same year. An oral history put together from the transcripts of the film as well as additional interviews called Queercore: How to Punk a Revolution: An Oral History by Liam Warfield, Walter Crasshole and Leyser was released by PM Press in 2021.

== Film ==
Filmmakers such as Kenneth Anger, Ron Rice, Jack Smith, early Andy Warhol and early John Waters, Vivienne Dick and the aforementioned Derek Jarman were influential in their depictions of queer subcultures. In 1990 the editors of J.D.s began presenting J.D.s movie nights in various cities showing films such as Bruce LaBruce's Boy, Girl and Bruce and Pepper Wayne Gacy's Home Movies, and G.B. Jones' The Troublemakers; after the demise of J.D.s, each made films exploring the queercore milieu; LaBruce released the feature length No Skin Off My Ass in 1991; G.B. Jones' The Troublemakers was released in 1990, followed by The Yo-Yo Gang in 1992. In 1996, J.D.s contributor Anonymous Boy completed the first animated queercore film, Green Pubes.

Documentary films about queercore include the 1996 releases She's Real, Worse Than Queer by Lucy Thane and Queercore: A Punk-u-mentary by Scott Treleaven. Gay Shame '98 by Scott Berry documents the first Gay shame event. Tracy Flannigan's Rise Above: A Tribe 8 Documentary was released in 2003, and Pansy Division: Life In A Gay Rock Band by Michael Carmona debuted in 2008, both films playing regularly at film festivals around the world.

2003 saw the premiere of the no budget comedy Malaqueerche: Queer Punk Rock Show by Sarah Adorable (of Scream Club) and Devon Devine, which brought the third wave of queercore to the screen. In 2008, G.B. Jones released the feature film The Lollipop Generation, featuring many of the participants in the queercore scene, including Jena von Brücker, Mark Ewert, Vaginal Davis, Jane Danger of Three Dollar Bill, Jen Smith, Joel Gibb, Anonymous Boy, Scott Treleaven and Gary Fembot of Sta-Prest, with music by The Hidden Cameras, Anonymous Boy and the Abominations, Bunny and the Lakers, Jane Danger, Swishin' Duds and Mariae Nascenti. All these films impacted the scene and broadened the scope of queercore to include film as another of its mediums of expression.

Lynn Breedlove (Tribe 8, writer), Matt Wobensmith (Outpunk Zine and Label, Queercorps Label), Jody Bleyle (Candy-Ass Records, Team Dresch, Hazel), The Psychic Sluts (Queer Performance Group), Wendy-O Matic (spoken word artist, writer), Laura Litter (Fabulous Disaster), Mia d´Bruzzi (Mudwimin, Fabulous Disaster) and Anna Joy (Blatz, Cyper in the Snow, The Gru´ps, writer) were interviewed in the documentary Step Up and Be Vocal – Interviews zu Queer Punk und Feminismus in San Francisco, a DIY-documentary made by German filmmakers Uta Busch and Sandra Ortmann in 2001.

2016 saw the premiere of the queer punk rock musical Spidarlings directed by Selene Kapsaski. The film was released in 2017 by Troma Entertainment.

== Zines ==
As with punk and hardcore, queercore culture existed outside of the mainstream, so amateur-produced and inexpensively photocopied zines were crucial to its development and to communication between members of the subculture. Hundreds of zines formed an intercontinental network that enabled queercore to spread and allow those in smaller, more repressive communities to participate and learn about bands, labels and scene activists. The DIY attitude of punk was integral to queercore as well.

In the 1990s, as the availability of the internet increased, many queercore zines could be found online as well as in print. Queercore forums and chatrooms, such as QueerPunks, started up. The Queer Zine Archive Project is an internet database of scanned queer zines that continues to grow. All these developments allowed queercore to become a self-sustaining and self-determined subculture, expressing itself through a variety of mediums independent of the straight and gay establishment.

== See also ==
- Gay Shame
- Gay skinhead
- Genderqueer
- Homo hop
- LGBTQ music
- Rainbow capitalism
