= J.D.s =

Canadian queer punk zine

- Format: Punk zine
- Founder: G. B. Jones; Bruce LaBruce
- Founded: 1985
- Final issue: 1991
- Country: Canada
- Language: English

J.D.s was a Canadian anarcho-punk queer zine which started in 1985 and ran for eight issues until 1991. The zine was co-authored by G.B Jones and Bruce LaBruce and is credited as being one of the first and most influential queer zines. The zine's content was centred around anarchic queer-punk themes and heavily discussed queer-skewed punk music from the late 1980s.

The zine is widely regarded as being greatly influential in inciting the queercore movement of the 1990s, which created a community for queer youths who were ostracised from both the gay and punk communities.

== Origins ==
The J.D.s zine was established in 1985 and was co-authored by G.B Jones and Bruce LaBruce. At the time of the zines inception, Jones was a member of the band Fifth Column and LaBruce was enrolled at York University, Toronto. Most commonly referred to as simply J.D.s, the acronym stands for 'Juvenile Delinquents'. Before the assembly of the zine duo, G.B. Jones got involved in creating the concept of her zines with Caroline Azar. Both of them worked on a zine named Hide. With this zine, they combined photography from existing zines and cassettes and made paper copies that were later released with compilations of tapes of underground music. G.B Jones and Bruce LaBruce were driven to create J.D.s as they felt outcast from both queer and punk scenes in Toronto. Sholem Krishtalka quotes G.B Jones: "All of the horribleness of Toronto compelled us to react against it in every possible way. It pushed us to this breaking point". In creating J.D.s, Jones and LaBruce generated a community for those at the intersection of queer and punk cultures; Stephen Duncombe highlights this, arguing that queer punk rockers "feel underrepresented in both predominantly straight punk zines and the liberal assimilationist gay and lesbian press. Therefore they use zines like Homocore and J.D.s as virtual meeting places". According to Bruce LaBruce, J.D.s "also encompassed such youth cult icons as James Dean and J. D. Salinger".

== Style and distribution ==
Widely regarded as the seminal queer-punk zine, J.D.s embodied a low-budget, DIY style which would become commonplace in following zines. J.D.s was characteristically provocative and "vehemently opinionated".

Scholars have drawn comparisons between zines and pamphlets; with zines emerging as contemporary, albeit an inexpensive and self-published, version of the latter. The DIY style as it fits within the broader queercore zine movement correlates to the "no budget" and "outside of the mass market" dissemination strategy, straying away from being trapped within the micro niche commercial sector. J.D.s zines were constructed and distributed from the assembly of different images, texts and wider queer-punk media, and simultaneously violated copyright, reproducing, reprinting, recycling, and rewriting procedures. These collages would then be photocopied and distributed to readers via mail, handouts between friends, small zine fairs, and listings inside of other zines.

In a controversial decision, J.D.s zines and their erotic visual depictions were taken out of the pages and into the public sphere with JD's parties, JD's zine conventions, and art gallery exhibits, placing the images onto posters and shirts, as well as into glass display cases to reach a broader community.

== Content ==
G.B Jones and Bruce LaBruce both contributed to the visual display of homocore models. G.B Jones' Tom Girl's series, which appears throughout J.D.s zines, takes inspiration from Tom of Finland's original visual artworks. By closely mimicking Finland's fetish art, Jones created images of dykes to closely represent sexually active and rebellious women.

Bruce LaBruce stole images from "dirty, glossy gay" magazines, and took consensual pornographic photographs of his friends and passers-by with his camera to showcase images of homosexual pornography in J.D.s zines.

Tracing the exact content of J.D.s issues proves difficult as the zine, like many others, was not made to be kept. J.D.s zines were part of a culture that was not easily recordable in the 1980s, and its material literature was not well historically preserved. In reaction to the advent of the scholarization of queercore fanzines and their cultural prominence in the punk movement, LaBruce affirms: "Punk isn't supposed to be written about, just like 'queercore' fanzines aren't supposed to be catalogued and historicised and analysed to death, for Christsake."

== Cultural significance ==
J.D.s is accredited as being key to inciting the wider queercore movement. "J.D.s is seen by many to be the catalyst that pushed the queercore scene into existence", writes Amy Spencer in DIY: The Rise of Lo-Fi Culture.

Jones and LaBruce initially coined the term 'homocore' to refer to the emerging subculture; this term was taken from one of Jone's mixtapes which reflected the intersection of queer/punk themes within her music taste. J.D.s zines as a part of the wider queercore movement was an offspring of the musical punk rock scene and reflected anti-corporate ideologies, visuals, and textual choices. Fanzines such as the Homocore series took influence from the punk and GLBTQ subcultures and credited the wider queercore movement with inspiring them to begin publishing. With this, the 1991 manifesto by Jones and LaBruce in the popular zine Maximumrocknroll stating: "Don't be gay, or how I learned to stop worrying and fuck punk up the ass" reflects J.D.s zine's propensity for queer activism. In 1992, J.D.s zines' cultural influence reached bands such as Vaginal Crème Davis, Afro Sisters, and Black Flag to participate in queer zine gatherings such as SPEW which were organized by newly formed organizations like Homocore Chicago.

The editors had initially chosen the appellation "homocore" to describe the movement they began, but later replaced the word 'homo' with 'queer' to create queercore, to better reflect the diversity of the scene and to disassociate themselves completely from the oppressive confines of the gay and lesbian communities' orthodoxy and agenda. In 1990 and 1991, Jones and LaBruce began presenting J.D.s movie nights. These happened in London in the UK, in San Francisco, and at Hallwalls in Buffalo in the U.S., and in Montreal, and Toronto in Canada with the editors and various contributors showing films, all made on extremely low budgets on Super 8 film, such as Jones' The Troublemakers and LaBruce's Boy, Girl and Bruce and Pepper Wayne Gacy's Home Movies. LaBruce's first pornographic film following J.D.s fanzines' milder erotic content reached international success with No Skin Off My Ass. This film gained attention across the world and painted him as a sell-out of the queercore movement whilst receiving no monetary gain.

LaBruce's films and J.D.s zines strategically utilized the fetishization of macho punk skinheads and figures representing toxic masculinity as a "bad object choice" strategy. This strategic approach emphasizing the authors' anti-hypermasculine cultural and political stances forced audiences to reevaluate their inner-core narratives, and propelled progressive cultural ideologies that would encourage the queer community to break their silence and embrace their true identities. In Bruce LaBruce's diary on his first hand experience and struggles of living up to the fame curated in the era of producing homocore and J.D.s zines, he recalls his disillusioned state of living on the edge of the homosexual underworld.

== See also ==
- Queer theory
