= Jello Biafra discography =

A detailed discography of releases by the hardcore punk musician and spoken word artist Jello Biafra:

== Releases with the Dead Kennedys ==
=== Studio albums ===
- Fresh Fruit for Rotting Vegetables - September 1980
- Plastic Surgery Disasters - November 1982
- Frankenchrist - October 1985
- Bedtime for Democracy - November 1986

=== Live albums ===
- Mutiny on the Bay - February 2001
- Live at the Deaf Club - March 2004
- DK 40 - April 2019

=== Compilation albums ===
- Give Me Convenience or Give Me Death - June 1987
- Milking the Sacred Cow - October 2007
- Iguana Studios Rehearsal Tape - November 2018

=== EPs ===
- In God We Trust, Inc. - December 1981

=== Singles ===
- "California Über Alles" - June 1979
- "Holiday in Cambodia" - May 1980
- "Kill the Poor" - October 1980
- "Too Drunk to Fuck" - May 1981
- "Nazi Punks Fuck Off" - November 1981
- "Bleed for Me" - July 1982
- "Halloween" - December 1982

=== Videos ===
- The Early Years Live - July 1987
- The Lost Tapes - July 2003
- DMPO's on Broadway - February 2004

== Albums with The Witch Trials ==
- The Witch Trials - 1980, with Adrian Borland, Morgan Fisher, Christian Lunch and East Bay Ray

== Albums with Lard ==
- The Power of Lard - 1989
- The Last Temptation of Reid - 1990
- Pure Chewing Satisfaction - 1997
- 70's Rock Must Die - 2000

== Albums with the No WTO Combo ==
- Live from the Battle in Seattle - 1999

== Spoken word ==
=== Albums ===
The following are solo albums released by Alternative Tentacles:

- No More Cocoons – 1987
- High Priest of Harmful Matter − Tales From the Trial – 1989
- I Blow Minds for a Living – 1991
- Beyond the Valley of the Gift Police – 1994
- If Evolution Is Outlawed, Only Outlaws Will Evolve – 1998
- Become the Media – 2001
- The Big Ka-Boom, Pt. 1 – 2002
- Machine Gun in the Clown's Hand – 2002
- In the Grip of Official Treason - 2006

=== EPs ===
- Die for Oil Sucker/Pledge of Allegiance - 1991

=== Singles ===
- The Green Wedge - 2000

== Collaborations ==
- How Do You Spell Relief? - Bank of Sodom (Vocals: Jello Biafra, Drums: David Licht, Other instruments: Kramer [David Licht and Kramer are both from Shockabilly]) on The End of Music (As We Know It) (1988)
- Last Scream of the Missing Neighbors (1989), with D.O.A.
- Supernaut EP (1990), with 1000 Homo DJs (credited as Count Ringworm)
- The Sky is Falling and I Want My Mommy (1991), with NoMeansNo
- Tumor Circus (1991), with Steel Pole Bathtub
- "Will the Fetus Be Aborted?" single (1993), with Mojo Nixon with the Toadliquors
- Prairie Home Invasion (1994), with Mojo Nixon with the Toadliquors
- "Raza Odiada (Pito Wilson)" (1995), with Brujeria (band)
- Never Breathe What You Can't See (2004), with The Melvins (credited as Osama McDonald)
- Sieg Howdy! (2005), with The Melvins
- "Jezebel" single (2008), with Brown Town West
- "Average Men" (2009), with Pansy Division
- "Punch", by Motorpsycho featuring Jello Biafra, on All Sewn Up - A Tribute To Patrik Fitzgerald (2009)
- Walk on Jindal's Splinters (2015), with The Raunch and Soul All-Stars

== Jello Biafra and the Guantanamo School of Medicine ==
- The Audacity of Hype (2009)
- Enhanced Methods of Questioning (2011)
- White People and the Damage Done (2013)
- Tea Party Revenge Porn (2020)

== Compilation albums ==
- Terminal City Ricochet Soundtrack (1989)
- The Bat Bites Back (1994) — "Love Me, I'm a Liberal" by Jello Biafra & Mojo Nixon with the Toadliquors (Phil Ochs cover)
- Less Rock, More Talk: A Spoken Word Compilation (2000)
- Apocalypse Always (2002)
- Mob Action Against The State (2002)
- Green Revolution - A Good Planet is Hard To Find (2002)
- Dropping Food On Their Heads is Not Enough: Benefit For RAWA (2002)
- Hardcore Breakout USA 1,2,3,... (2004)
- Rock Against Bush, Vol. 1 (2004)
- Radio 1190: The Local Shakedown Volume 2 (2004)
- Hardcore Breakout - Essential Punk (2012)

== Guest appearances ==
- The Iceberg/Freedom of Speech...Just Watch What You Say (1989) by Ice-T — spoken word sampled on "Shut Up, Be Happy" and "Freedom Of Speech"
- Double Happiness (1991) by John + Julie — spoken word sampled on "Double Happiness (Shut Up - Be Happy!)"
- Body Count (1992) by Body Count — spoken word sampled on "Freedom Of Speech"
- Chaos A.D. (1993) by Sepultura — co-writing and vocals on "Biotech is Godzilla"
- Human = Garbage (1994) by Dystopia — spoken word contributions on "Sanctity"
- Notes From Thee Underground (1994) by Pigface — contributions to "Hagseed"
- Helter Skelter (1996) by The D.O.C. — spoken word sampled on "Secret Plan"
- Ixnay on the Hombre (1997) by The Offspring — spoken word parts for "Disclaimer"
- Just Trip (1997) by Life After Life — vocals on "Still Is Still Moving To Me"
- Let Us Play! (1997) by Coldcut — vocals on "Every Home a Prison"
- Deviant (2000) by Pitchshifter — spoken word parts for "As Seen on T.V."
- America's Sweetheart (2000) by Spit
- Nation (2001) by Sepultura — vocals on "Politricks"
- Tool - Parabola- Commentary on video on DVD single.
- War (If It Feels Good, Do It) (2004) by various artists — spoken word sampled on "Nobody Cares (Die For Oil Sucker)" by the DJs of Mass Destruction
- Hardcore Breakout USA 1,2,3,... (2004) by Various, vocals on JFA "Clown Part"
- The Code Is Red...Long Live the Code (2005) by Napalm Death — vocals on "The Great and the Good"
- Broker's Banquet (2005) by The Yuppie Pricks — vocals on "Damn, It Feels Good To Be A Yuppie"
- Rio Grande Blood (2006) by Ministry — vocals on "Ass Clown"
- Cocked and Loaded (2006) by Revolting Cocks — lead vocals on "Dead End Streets" and "Viagra Culture"
- Liberty Toast (2006) by Disaster Strikes — backing vocals on "Mission Accomplished"
- J'Irai Chier dans ton Vomi (2006) by Métal Urbain — producer and vocals in "Inventer ta vie"
- Grand 'ol Party Crash (2006) by Cage
- Pick a Bigger Weapon (2006) by The Coup — spoken word on "Two Enthusiastic Thumbs Down"
- Children of the Secret State (2006) by Throw Rag
- Pandelirium (2006) by Th' Legendary Shack Shakers — vocals on "Ichabod!" and "No Such Thing"
- Blowfly's Punk Rock Party (2006) by Blowfly — vocals on "R. Kelly in Cambodia"
- Deadline (2007) by Leftöver Crack and Citizen Fish — spoken word parts for "Baby-Punchers"
- Everybody Make Some Noise! (2008) by The A.K.A.s (Are Everywhere!) — spoken word on "Deaf Before Dishonor"
- Rocky Mountain Low: The Colorado Musical Underground Of The 1970s (2009) by various artists — vocals with The Healers on "School Bus", "Cruisin", "Obey the Law", and "California über alles"
- Surgical Meth Machine (2016) by Surgical Meth Machine — vocals on "I Don't Wanna"
- Moral Hygiene (2021) by Ministry — vocals on "Sabotage is Sex"
