= Dead Kennedys discography =

Band discography

- Studio albums: 4
- Extended plays: 1
- Live albums: 3
- Compilation albums: 4
- Singles: 9
- Video albums: 4
- Music videos: 4

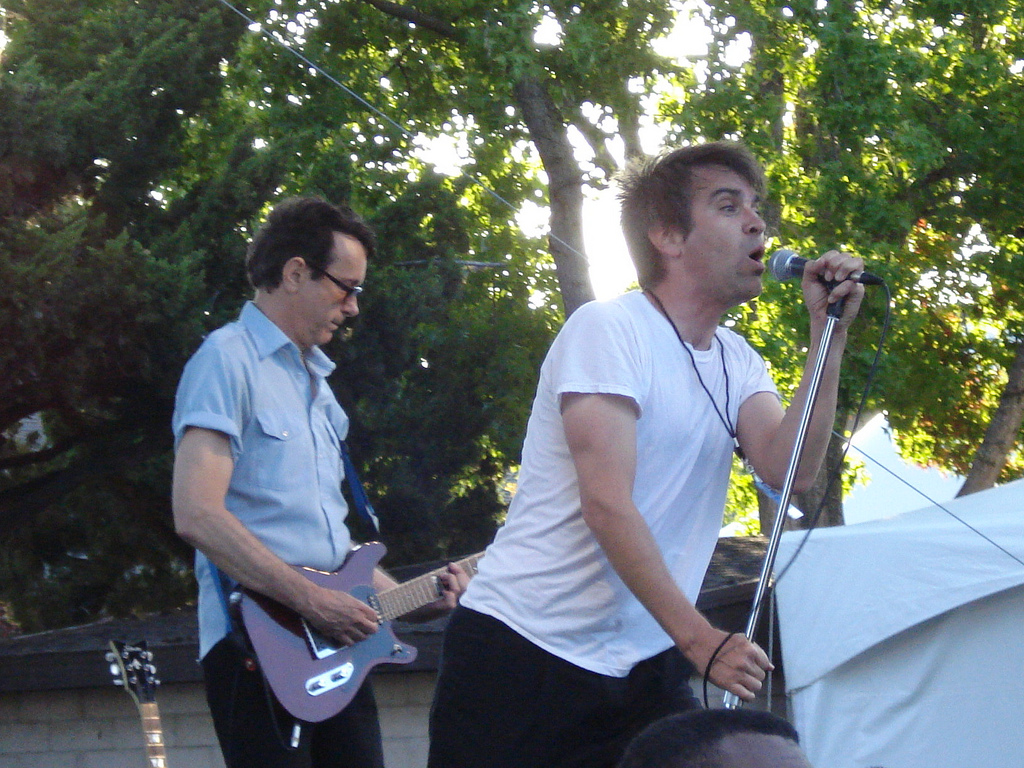
Dead Kennedys, Harmony Festival, 2009

American punk rock band Dead Kennedys has released four studio albums, one extended play, three live albums, and four compilations.

== Albums ==
=== Studio albums ===
| Title | Album details | Peak chart positions | | | | Certifications |
| Title | Album details | AUS | NZ | UK | UK Indie | Certifications |
|---|---|---|---|---|---|---|
| Fresh Fruit for Rotting Vegetables | Released: September 2, 1980; Label: Alternative Tentacles; Formats: LP, cassette, CD | 98 | 33 | 33 | 2 | BPI: Gold; RIAA: Gold |
| Plastic Surgery Disasters | Released: November 1982; Label: Alternative Tentacles; Formats: LP, cassette, CD | — | 40 | — | 2 | BPI: Gold |
| Frankenchrist | Released: October 1985; Label: Alternative Tentacles; Formats: LP, cassette, CD | — | — | — | 1 | BPI: Silver |
| Bedtime for Democracy | Released: November 1986; Label: Alternative Tentacles; Formats: LP, cassette, CD | — | — | — | 1 | BPI: Silver |
"—" denotes a recording that did not chart or was not released in that territory.

=== Live albums ===
| Title | Album details | Peak chart positions | Certifications |
| Title | Album details | US | Certifications |
|---|---|---|---|
| Mutiny on the Bay | Released: April 24, 2001; Label: Manifesto; Formats: LP, CD, digital download | — | |
| Live at the Deaf Club | Released: January 27, 2004; Label: Manifesto; Formats: CD, digital download | — | |
| DK 40 | Released: April 26, 2019; Label: Manifesto; Formats: LP, CD, digital download | — | |
"—" denotes a recording that did not chart or was not released in that territory.

=== Compilation albums ===
| Title | Album details | Peak chart positions | | | Certifications |
| Title | Album details | US Indie | UK | UK Indie | Certifications |
|---|---|---|---|---|---|
| Give Me Convenience or Give Me Death | Released: 1987; Label: Alternative Tentacles; Formats: LP, cassette, CD | — | 84 | 1 | RIAA: Gold; BPI: Gold |
| Milking the Sacred Cow | Released: October 9, 2007; Label: Manifesto; Formats: CD | — | — | — | |
| Original Singles Collection | Released: April 15, 2014; Label: Manifesto; Formats: 7" box set | — | — | — | |
| Iguana Studios Rehearsal Tape — San Francisco 1978 | Released: November 23, 2018; Label: Manifesto; Formats: LP, CD | 17 | — | — | |
"—" denotes a recording that did not chart or was not released in that territory.

== EPs ==
| Title | Album details | Peak chart positions | | Certifications |
| Title | Album details | NZ | UK Indie | Certifications |
|---|---|---|---|---|
| In God We Trust, Inc. | Released: 1981; Label: Alternative Tentacles; Formats: LP, cassette, CD | 23 | 3 | BPI: Gold |
"—" denotes a recording that did not chart or was not released in that territory.

== Singles ==
| Title | Year | Peak chart positions | | | Album |
| Title | Year | NZ | UK | UK Indie | Album |
|---|---|---|---|---|---|
| "California Über Alles" | 1979 | — | — | 4 | Fresh Fruit for Rotting Vegetables |
| "Holiday in Cambodia" | 1980 | 40 | — | 2 | Fresh Fruit for Rotting Vegetables |
| "Kill the Poor" | 1980 | — | 49 | 1 | Fresh Fruit for Rotting Vegetables |
| "Police Truck" | 1980 | — | — | — | Give Me Convenience or Give Me Death |
| "Too Drunk to Fuck" | 1981 | 9 | 36 | 1 | Give Me Convenience or Give Me Death |
| "Nazi Punks Fuck Off" | 1981 | — | — | 11 | In God We Trust, Inc. |
| "Bleed for Me" | 1982 | 40 | — | 3 | Plastic Surgery Disasters |
| "Halloween" | 1982 | — | — | 3 | Plastic Surgery Disasters |
"—" denotes a recording that did not chart or was not released in that territory.

== Music videos ==
- "Holiday in Cambodia"
- "Forest Fire"
- "California Über Alles"
- "Kill the Poor"

== Videos ==
| Year | Video details |
|---|---|
| 1991 | Dead Kennedys Live: Released: 1991; Label: Rhino; Format: VHS |
| 2000 | DMPO's On Broadway: Released: May 30, 2000; Label: Cherry Red; Format: DVD |
| 2001 | The Early Years Live: Released: July 3, 2001; Label: Cherry Red; Format: DVD, VHS |
| 2003 | In God We Trust, Inc.: The Lost Tapes: Released: July 22, 2003; Label: Cherry Red; Format: DVD, VHS |

== Other appearances ==
The following Dead Kennedys tracks were released on compilations. This is not an exhaustive list; tracks that were first released on the band's albums, EPs, or singles are not included.

| Year | Details | Track(s) |
|---|---|---|
| 1981 | Let Them Eat Jellybeans!: Released: 1981; Label: Alternative Tentacles (VIRUS 4); Format: LP | "Nazi Punks Fuck Off" |
| 1981 | Wake the Dead: Released: 1981; Label: Take It! Magazine (1150195); Format: flexi 7" | "Nazi Punks Fuck Off" (exclusive mix) |
| 1982 | Not So Quiet on the Western Front: Released: 1982; Label: Alternative Tentacles (VIRUS 14); Format: 2xLP, CD | "A Child and His Lawn Mower"^{[I]} |
| 1982 | Wargasm: Released: 1982; Label: Pax Records (PAX 4); Format: LP | "Kinky Sex Makes the World Go Round"^{[I]} |
| 1986 | Play New Rose for Me: Released: 1986; Label: New Rose Records (ROSE 100); Format: LP, CD | "I Fought the Law"^{[I]} |

I Denotes tracks that were re-released on Give Me Convenience or Give Me Death.
