= Milking the Sacred Cow =

Compilation album by Dead Kennedys
- Released: October 9, 2007
- Genre: Hardcore punk
- Length: 39:07
- Label: Cherry Red, Manifesto
- Producer: East Bay Ray, Geza X, Jello Biafra, Thom Wilson

Dead Kennedys chronology
Live at the Deaf Club (2004)	Milking the Sacred Cow (2007)	Original Singles Collection (2014)

Professional ratings
Review scores
Source	Rating
Allmusic	3.5/5 stars

Milking the Sacred Cow is a compilation album by San Francisco punk rock band Dead Kennedys. Released in 2007, it comprises songs recorded between 1979 and 1985 that originally appeared on the band's various studio albums and singles. The compilation also contains two previously unreleased live versions of songs from the band's Frankenchrist album. Notably, Milking the Sacred Cow contains no material from the Dead Kennedys’ final studio album, Bedtime for Democracy.

Milking the Sacred Cow was compiled and released several years after a lengthy lawsuit, which resulted in the rights to the Dead Kennedys' catalog being transferred from lead singer/songwriter Jello Biafra's record label, Alternative Tentacles, to the other three members of the band.

The album's title alludes to these band members profiting (the “milking”) from early Dead Kennedys material (the “sacred cow”) by rereleasing them on a compilation. The album has been criticized by former lead singer Jello Biafra.

== Track listing ==
No.	Title	Writer(s)	Original appearance	Length
1.	"California Über Alles" (Single version)	Jello Biafra, John Greenway	California Über Alles (single), Give Me Convenience or Give Me Death	3:28
2.	"Police Truck"	Biafra, East Bay Ray	Police Truck (single), Give Me Convenience or Give Me Death	2:26
3.	"Kill the Poor"	Biafra, Ray	Kill the Poor (single), Fresh Fruit for Rotting Vegetables	3:08
4.	"Holiday in Cambodia" (Single version)	Dead Kennedys	Holiday in Cambodia (single), Give Me Convenience or Give Me Death	3:46
5.	"Nazi Punks Fuck Off"	Biafra	Nazi Punks Fuck Off (single), In God We Trust, Inc.	1:04
6.	"Too Drunk to Fuck"	Biafra	Too Drunk to Fuck (single), Give Me Convenience or Give Me Death	2:42
7.	"Viva Las Vegas"	Doc Pomus, Mort Shuman	Fresh Fruit for Rotting Vegetables	2:41
8.	"Moon Over Marin"	Biafra, Ray	Plastic Surgery Disasters	3:44
9.	"Halloween"	Dead Kennedys	Halloween (single), Plastic Surgery Disasters	3:37
10.	"M.T.V. Get Off the Air"	Biafra	Frankenchrist	3:38
11.	"Soup is Good Food" (Live at The Stone, San Francisco, CA, 2/16/86)	Dead Kennedys		4:39
12.	"Jock-O-Rama" (Live at The Stone, San Francisco, CA, 2/17/86)	Biafra		4:19

== Personnel ==
Dead Kennedys

- Jello Biafra – lead vocals; producer on track 10
- East Bay Ray – guitar; producer on tracks 1, 4, 5, 6, 11, 12; mixed tracks 2 & 3
- Klaus Flouride – bass, backing vocals
- D.H. Peligro – drums
- Ted – drums on tracks 1, 2, 3, 4, 7

Technical

- Geza X – producer on tracks 2, 3, 7; engineer on tracks 2 & 3
- Thom Wilson – producer on tracks 8 & 9
- Jim Keylon – engineer on track 1
- Oliver Dicicco – engineer on tracks 4, 5, 6, 7
- John Cuniberti – engineer on tracks 8, 9, 10, 11, 12
