= Iguana Studios Rehearsal Tape =

Demo album by Dead Kennedys
- Released: September 27, 2019
- Recorded: 1978
- Studio: Iguana Studios
- Genre: punk rock
- Length: 37:28
- Language: English
- Label: Manifesto
- Producer: Dan Perloff
- Compiler: East Bay Ray

Dead Kennedys chronology
| Original Singles Collection (2014) | Iguana Studios Rehearsal Tape (2019) | DK 40 (2019) |

Iguana Studios Rehearsal Tape is a demo tape recorded by the San Francisco hardcore punk band Dead Kennedys, recorded at former studio Iguana Studios in San Francisco, California in 1978. This demo tape compiles the demos the band recorded while they were a five-piece. A few of these songs would go on to be re-recorded and released on Fresh Fruit for Rotting Vegetables, In God We Trust, Inc., and Give Me Convenience or Give Me Death. It would be around 40 years after it was recorded until it would officially be released on September 27, 2019.

== Track listing ==
All tracks are written by Jello Biafra, except where noted.

| No. | Title | Writer(s) | Length |
|---|---|---|---|
| 1. | "The Man With the Dogs" (Demo) | | 3:19 |
| 2. | "Kepone Kids" (Demo) | | 2:11 |
| 3. | "Forward to Death" (Demo) | 6025 | 1:40 |
| 4. | "Kill the Poor" (Demo) | Biafra, East Bay Ray | 3:27 |
| 5. | "Your Emotions" (Demo) | Ray | 1:48 |
| 6. | "Dreadlock of the Suburbs" (Demo) | | 3:02 |
| 7. | "I Kill Children" (Demo) | | 2:18 |
| 8. | "Cold Fish" (Demo) | | 2:50 |
| 9. | "Holiday in Cambodia" (Demo) | Dead Kennedys | 4:31 |
| 10. | "Kidnap" (Demo) | | 1:24 |
| 11. | "Mutations of Today" (Demo) | | 5:04 |
| 12. | "Rawhide" (Demo) | Dimitri Tiomkin, Ned Washington | 2:07 |
| 13. | "California Über Alles" (Demo) | Biafra, John Greenway | 3:47 |
| Total length: | | | 37:28 |

=== Notes ===
- Tracks 1, 9, and 13 were re-recorded and released as singles.
- Tracks 3, 4, 5, 7, 9, and 13 were later re-recorded and released on Fresh Fruit for Rotting Vegetables.
- Tracks 2 and 12 were re-recorded and track 13 was updated and re-recorded a second time after Fresh Fruit and released on In God We Trust, Inc.

== Personnel ==
=== Band ===
- Jello Biafra – vocals
- East Bay Ray – guitar, Echoplex
- 6025 – second guitar
- Klaus Flouride – bass, backing vocals
- Ted – drums

=== Production ===
- East Bay Ray – compiler
- Dan Perloff – producer
- Evan S. Cohen – executive producer

=== Art ===
- Jill Hoffman-Kowal – photography
- Lisa Sutton – package design
