= Virus 100 =

Compilation album by Various Artists
- Released: May 1, 1992
- Genre: Punk rock Alternative rock Noise rock Hardcore punk Death metal Hip hop
- Length: 54:43
- Label: Alternative Tentacles

Professional ratings
Review scores
Source	Rating
Allmusic	link
Punknews.org	link

Virus 100 is a compilation album released by Alternative Tentacles. Featuring cover versions of Dead Kennedys songs performed by various artists, the album celebrates the record label's 100th release and its 10th anniversary.

== Overview ==
In 1992, Jello Biafra-founded record label, Alternative Tentacles, released its 100th album. Wanting to do something special for such a momentous occasion, they decided to release a tribute album of fifteen Dead Kennedys' songs by sixteen different (mostly in-house) artists. "Let's Lynch the Landlord" is covered by both Faith No More and L7. Musical styles on the album vary from the hip hop of The Disposable Heroes of Hiphoprisy's "California über alles" to Nomeansno's a cappella version of "Forward to Death."

== Reception ==
Allmusic's Bradley Torreano called the album "a fitting tribute to an underrated band and serves as an excellent introduction to their music." Torreano added that The Disposable Heroes of Hiphoprisy's version of "California über alles" is an "amazing remake" and the album's "most interesting turn." Brandon Sideleau of Punknews.org said, "while not all the songs on this self-appointed tribute from Alternative Tentacles live up to their masterpiece counterparts, it still ranks as easily one of the best tribute albums of all time." The A.V. Club stated: "Solipsism aside, the disc succeeds: Everyone from Neurosis and Napalm Death to Mojo Nixon and L7 contribute renditions of DK's manic, twangy, hardcore anthems."

== Track listing ==
1. The Didjits – "Police Truck" – 2:18
2. Evan Johns & His H-Bombs – "Too Drunk to Fuck" – 3:38
3. Alice Donut – "Halloween" – 5:11
4. Faith No More – "Let's Lynch the Landlord" – 2:53
5. Napalm Death – "Nazi Punks Fuck Off" – 1:21
6. NoMeansNo – "Forward to Death" – 1:12
7. Steel Pole Bath Tub – "Chemical Warfare" – 3:31
8. Neurosis – "Saturday Night Holocaust" – 6:51
9. Les Thugs – "Moon Over Marin" – 5:28
10. Victim's Family – "Ill in the Head" – 2:41
11. The Disposable Heroes of Hiphoprisy – "California über alles" – 4:47
12. Mojo Nixon and the Toadliquors – "Winnebago Warrior" – 3:29
13. Sepultura – "Drug Me" – 1:49
14. Kramer – "Insight" – 3:06
15. L7 – "Let's Lynch the Landlord" – 2:01
16. Sister Double Happiness – "Holiday in Cambodia" – 4:16
