= Mutiny on the Bay =

Live album by Dead Kennedys
- Released: April 24, 2001
- Recorded: March 1982 and February 1986
- Genre: Hardcore punk
- Length: 51:16
- Label: Manifesto
- Producer: East Bay Ray

Dead Kennedys chronology
Give Me Convenience or Give Me Death (1987)	Mutiny on the Bay (2001)	Live at the Deaf Club (2004)

Professional ratings
Review scores
Source	Rating
Allmusic	link

Mutiny on the Bay is an album of live recordings by the Dead Kennedys. The album’s material was compiled from a number of concerts in 1982 and 1986 in the band’s hometown of San Francisco with an additional track taken from the band’s final show in Davis, California before their break up in 1986.

Mutiny on the Bay was put together and released after a lengthy lawsuit, which resulted in the rights to the Dead Kennedys' catalog being transferred from lead singer/songwriter Jello Biafra's record label, Alternative Tentacles to the other three members of the band following Biafra's conviction on civil fraud and other charges. The album’s title alludes to the wresting of these rights (the “mutiny”) and the band’s home (The San Francisco Bay Area) with a nod to the Royal Navy’s famed Mutiny on the Bounty that served as the basis for numerous novels and films. The album’s quality has been criticized by singer Jello Biafra.

== Track listing ==
All tracks are written by Jello Biafra, except where noted.

No.	Title	Writer(s)	Venue ~ City ~ Date	Length
1.	Untitled (Introduction)		Elite Club - San Francisco, CA, 3/20/82	0:22
2.	"Police Truck" (Live)		Elite Club - San Francisco, CA, 3/20/82	2:38
3.	"Kill the Poor" (Live)	Biafra, East Bay Ray	Freeborn Hall - Davis, CA, 2/21/86	3:04
4.	"Holiday in Cambodia" (Live)	Dead Kennedys	Elite Club - San Francisco, CA, 3/20/82	4:30
5.	"Moon Over Marin" (Live)		The Stone - San Francisco, CA, 2/17/86	3:34
6.	"California Über Alles" (Live)	Biafra, John Greenway	The Stone - San Francisco, CA, 2/16/86	4:29
7.	"M.T.V. Get off the Air" (Live)		The Stone - San Francisco, CA, 2/17/86	4:14
8.	"Too Drunk to Fuck" (Live)		The Stone - San Francisco, CA, 2/16/86	2:54
9.	"Goons of Hazzard" (Live)		The Stone - San Francisco, CA, 2/17/86	4:07
10.	"This Could Be Anywhere (This Could Be Everywhere)" (Live)		The Stone - San Francisco, CA, 2/16/86	4:22
11.	"Forward to Death" (Live)	6025	Elite Club - San Francisco, CA, 3/20/82	1:10
12.	"I Am the Owl" (Live)		Elite Club - San Francisco, CA, 3/20/82	5:15
13.	"Hellnation" (Live)	D.H. Peligro	The Stone - San Francisco, CA, 2/16/86	2:59
14.	"Riot" (Live)		Elite Club - San Francisco, CA, 3/20/82	7:31

== Venues ==
The album is not one consecutive concert, but rather tracks culled from various performances in 1982 and 1986.

The tracks "Police Truck", "Holiday in Cambodia", "Forward to Death", "I Am the Owl" and "Riot" were recorded at the Elite Club, San Francisco, on March 20, 1982. "Hellnation", "California über alles", "Too Drunk to Fuck" and "This Could Be Anywhere" were recorded at The Stone, San Francisco, on February 16, 1986. "Moon Over Marin", "M.T.V. − Get off the Air" and "Goons of Hazard" were also recorded at The Stone the following day.

As a peculiarity "Kill the Poor" was recorded on February 21, 1986, at Freeborn Hall in Davis, California. The show is notable in that it was the final performance of the Dead Kennedys with Jello Biafra.

== Personnel ==
Dead Kennedys

- Jello Biafra – lead vocals
- East Bay Ray – guitar, producer, mixing
- Klaus Flouride – bass, backing vocals
- D.H. Peligro – drums

Additional personnel

- John Cuniberti – engineer, mastering
- Sue Brisk – photography
