= What Were We Fighting For? =

Compilation album by various artists
- Released: August 4, 1998
- Genre: Punk rock
- Label: Know Records

What Were We Fighting For? is a tribute album to the punk rock band Dead Kennedys.

== Track listing ==
1. "Government Flu"- Arson Family
2. "Terminal Preppy"- Gob
3. "Your Emotions"- Electric Frankenstein
4. "Police Truck"- Das Klown
5. "Moon Over Marin"- The Dread
6. "Religious Vomit"- Anal Cunt
7. "Forward to Death"- Eyelid
8. "Hyperactive Child"- Visual Discrimination
9. "Life Sentence"- No Fraud
10. "When You Get Drafted"- Angry Little Man
11. "Jock-O-Rama"- Politikill Incorect
12. "California über alles"- Vitamin L
13. "MTV Get Off the Air"- Drain Bramaged
14. "Too Drunk to Fuck"- Blanks 77
15. "I Kill Children"- Insult
16. "Moral Majority"- The Missing 23rd
17. "Nazi Punks Fuck Off"- Final Conflict
