= Live at the Deaf Club =

Live album by Dead Kennedys
- Released: January 27, 2004
- Recorded: March 3, 1979
- Genre: Hardcore punk
- Length: 39:29
- Label: Manifesto
- Producer: East Bay Ray

Dead Kennedys chronology
Mutiny on the Bay (2001)	Live at the Deaf Club (2004)	Milking the Sacred Cow (2007)

Professional ratings
Review scores
Source	Rating
AllMusic	4.5/5 stars

Live at the Deaf Club is a live album released by the Dead Kennedys in 2004 and had a limited edition re-release 2013 in the UK on Let Them Eat Vinyl. The actual performance took place at the San Francisco Deaf Club on March 3, 1979.

The performance was unique in that this was the last time their rhythm guitarist 6025 performed with them. It also includes original drummer Ted, later replaced in February 1981 by D.H. Peligro. Also, the song "Gaslight" and their covers of "Back in the U.S.S.R." and "Have I the Right" are not found on any other DK album (The Deaf Club recordings of "Short Songs" and "Straight A's" are featured on the compilation album Give Me Convenience Or Give Me Death and the hard-to-find Can You Hear Me? Music From The Deaf Club along with "Police Truck"). "Back in Rhodesia" is an early version of "When Ya Get Drafted" with a different chorus than the final version. "Kill the Poor" is also a "disco" version minus the introduction.

The album has drawn criticism from former lead singer Jello Biafra, who lost control of the Dead Kennedys name after being found guilty of civil fraud and malice for withholding full royalties from his bandmates for several years. However, several critics have given the album good reviews, for example PopMatters and Punknews.org.

== Track listing ==
No.	Title	Writer(s)	Length
1.	"Introduction by DJ Johnnie Walker"	Johnnie Walker	0:20
2.	"[[Kill the Poor|Kill the Poor (disco version]]" (Live)	Jello Biafra, East Bay Ray	3:57
3.	"Back in Rhodesia" (Live)	Biafra	1:31
4.	"The Man with the Dogs" (Live)	Biafra	3:22
5.	"Gaslight" (Live)	6025	2:40
6.	"California Über Alles" (Live)	Biafra, John Greenway	1:03
7.	"Ill in the Head" (Live)	Biafra, 6025	3:25
8.	"Straight A's" (Live)	Biafra, 6025	2:13
9.	"Short Songs" (Live)	6025	0:31
10.	"Holiday in Cambodia" (Live)	Dead Kennedys	4:33
11.	"Police Truck" (Live)	Biafra, Ray	2:54
12.	"Forward to Death" (Live)	6025	1:53
13.	"Have I the Right?" (Live)	Alan Blaikley, Ken Howard	2:16
14.	"Back in the U.S.S.R." (Live)	Lennon–McCartney	2:31
15.	"Viva Las Vegas" (Live)	Doc Pomus, Mort Shuman	3:31
Total length:			36:40

== Personnel ==
=== Dead Kennedys ===
- Jello Biafra – lead vocals
- East Bay Ray – lead guitar
- 6025 – rhythm guitar
- Klaus Flouride – bass, backing vocals
- Ted – drums

=== Technical ===
- East Bay Ray - producing
- Sue Brisk – photography
- Jim Alcivar – engineering
- Justin Phelps – mixing
- John Cuniberti – mastering
