= I Kill Children =

Song by Dead Kennedys

from the album Fresh Fruit For Rotting Vegetables
- Released: 2 September 1980
- Recorded: May–June 1980
- Studio: Möbius Music in San Francisco
- Genre: Hardcore punk
- Length: 2:04
- Label: Cherry Red; Alternative Tentacles; Faulty Products; Manifesto
- Songwriter: Jello Biafra
- Producers: Norm; East Bay Ray

"I Kill Children" is the ninth song on the Dead Kennedys album Fresh Fruit for Rotting Vegetables. It is sung from the first person perspective of an unnamed murderer of children. It satirizes America's twin obsessions with extreme violence and conservatism. Jello Biafra had said on his spoken word tours that he wrote the song when he was 19 years old after thinking about how and why people became serial killers, and actually considers it one of his weakest songs.

== Critical reaction ==
Lester Bangs dismissed it as a "critical but impotent" fantasy and said the closest thing to a funny line was "offer them a helping hand of open telephone wires".

Eckhard Gerdes compared the song to the skinhead fiction of experimental writer Harold Jaffe.

== Influence ==
The line spoken at the beginning, "God told me to skin you alive" - which Jello Biafra claims to have taken from a Chick tract - was later used as the title of a Winston Smith collage that was used as the artwork for Green Day's Insomniac album. A portion of this collage (the dentist) had previously been used in another collage by Smith which was released with Dead Kennedys' Plastic Surgery Disasters album.
