= DMPO's on Broadway =

Dead Kennedys: DMPO's On Broadway

Video by Dead Kennedys
- Released: 1985 (VHS); 2000 (DVD)
- Recorded: June 16, 1984
- Venue: On Broadway, San Francisco
- Genre: Punk rock, hardcore punk
- Length: 59:42
- Label: Alternative Tentacles (VHS); Cherry Red (DVD)
- Director: Dirk B.G. Dirksen

Dead Kennedys: DMPO's On Broadway is a concert video by the American punk rock band Dead Kennedys, documenting their entire June 16, 1984 performance as the headlining act on the closing night of the On Broadway, a former avant-garde theatre and nightclub in San Francisco, California, located in the North Beach neighborhood at 435 Broadway Street, housed in the upper level of a building shared with the Mabuhay Gardens nightclub. (Note: The On Broadway was run at that time by Dirksen-Miller Productions (DMP or DMPO), the concert promotion firm co-owned by Dirk Dirksen and Carl Miller. Hence the title of the video.)

The 58-minute show was captured in real time, using four color cameras and a stereo hi-fi track.

Originally released in VHS format in 1985 as Dead Kennedys: Live in San Francisco, it would be re-released on DVD in 2000, under its current title.

== Track listing ==
1. "Police Truck"
2. "Hop with the Jet Set"
3. "A Child and His Lawnmower"
4. "Religious Vomit"
5. "Do the Slag"
6. "Moral Majority"
7. "M.T.V. − Get off the Air"
8. "Life Sentence"
9. "Jock-O-Rama"
10. "Goons of Hazzard"
11. "Riot"
12. "Bleed for Me"
13. "Nazi Punks Fuck Off!"
14. "We've Got a Bigger Problem Now"
