= No More Cocoons =

Studio album by Jello Biafra
- Released: 1987
- Genre: Spoken word
- Length: 109:56
- Label: Alternative Tentacles
- Producer: Jello Biafra

Jello Biafra chronology
No More Cocoons (1987)	High Priest of Harmful Matter: Tales From the Trial (1989)

Professional ratings
Review scores
Source	Rating
Allmusic	4.5/5 stars
New Musical Express	20/10

No More Cocoons is the first spoken word album by Jello Biafra.

== Track listing ==
Disc 1

No.	Title	Length
1.	"Message From Our Sponsor"	2:58
2.	"Soundbite - Jaw One / The Prosecutor Speaks"	0:21
3.	"Mild Kingdom"	4:39
4.	"Soundbite - Jaw Two"	1:20
5.	"Vietnam Never Happened"	2:12
6.	"What Reagan Didn't Know"	12:40
7.	"May All Your Dreams Be Wonderful"	10:39
8.	"Soundbite - Jaw Three"	2:04
9.	"Urinalysis Is Freedom"	11:16
10.	"Names For Bands (New Improved Version)"	14:55
Total length:		63:04

Disc 2

No.	Title	Length
11.	"Talk On Censorship / Letter To Tipper Gore"	26:04
12.	"Why I'm Glad The Space Shuttle Blew Up"	2:51
13.	"Fuck Facts!"	6:57
14.	"Stars & Stripes Of Corruption"	11:00
Total length:		46:52
