= The Witch Trials =

British-American musical supergroup

- Origin: United States
- Genres: Electropunk
- Years active: 1980–1981
- Label: Subterranean Records
- Past members: Jello Biafra; Adrian Borland; Morgan Fisher; Christian Lunch

The Witch Trials was a one-off musical collaboration between Jello Biafra (of Dead Kennedys), Adrian Borland (of the Sound), Morgan Fisher (of Mott the Hoople) and Christian Lunch. The group released only one self-titled EP.

== The Witch Trials EP ==
The Witch Trials was recorded in England. According to Biafra, "The Witch Trials is the most evil record I've ever been associated with".

Professional ratings
Review scores
| Source | Rating |
|---|---|
| AllMusic | 4/5 stars |

The EP was released in 1981 by Subterranean Records. According to John Trubee of Spin, the EP was released "with virtually no promotion and no information".

=== Reception ===
Spin said the album, "Biafra improvised most of the vocals here, spewing surreal nightmares fraught with sociopolitical overtones over a zombie pulse of electronic ugliness. All the material possesses this crude, ludicrous, insane, homemade feel — almost as if the material should never have made it to vinyl."

=== Track listing ===
| No. | Title | Length |
|---|---|---|
| 1. | "Humanoids from the Deep" | 6:56 |
| 2. | "The Tazer" | 6:18 |
| 3. | "Trapped in the Playground" | 4:01 |
| 4. | "Meat Beat" | 3:36 |
