= In God We Trust, Inc.: The Lost Tapes =

2003 video album by the Dead Kennedys

Video by Dead Kennedys
- Released: July 22, 2003
- Genre: Hardcore punk
- Length: 55:00
- Label: Music Video Distributors

In God We Trust, Inc.: The Lost Tapes is VHS/DVD of the Dead Kennedys' first recording session of their EP, In God We Trust Inc. It was released in July 2003. The session was filmed in June 1981 by Joe Rees at Target Video. When the Dead Kennedys went to master the tape it started to peel and deteriorate, so they had to record it again. that session took place in August and was used for the EP. The video tapes of the session were in the Dead Kennedys's video collection. This film was directed and edited by Eric S. Goodfield and was released to celebrate the 25th anniversary of Dead Kennedys EP In God We Trust, Inc. It includes live versions of all of the songs except "Hyperactive Child", for which no live footage could be found.

== Track list ==
=== Studio versions ===
1. Hyperactive Child
2. Nazi Punks Fuck Off
3. Kepone Factory
4. Dogbite
5. Religious Vomit
6. We've Got a Bigger Problem Now
7. Rawhide
8. Moral Majority

=== Alternate versions ===
1. Hyperactive Child (studio version overlaying live montage)
2. Nazi Punks Fuck Off (live at the Ritz, Austin, Texas – August 7, 1982)
3. Kepone Factory (live at Mabuhay Gardens, San Francisco, California – October 10, 1979)
4. Dogbite (live at the Ritz, Austin, Texas – August 7, 1982)
5. Religious Vomit (live at the On Broadway, San Francisco, California – June 16, 1984)
6. We've Got a Bigger Problem Now (live at Mabuhay Gardens, San Francisco, California – April 4, 1981)
7. Rawhide (live at the Island, Houston, Texas – August 18, 1984)
8. Moral Majority (live at the Keystone, Palo Alto, California – February 17, 1986)
