= Live from the Battle in Seattle =

Live album by The No WTO Combo
- Released: May 16, 2000
- Recorded: December 1, 1999
- Genre: Hardcore punk, spoken word
- Length: 44:21
- Label: Alternative Tentacles

Professional ratings
Review scores
Source	Rating
AllMusic	link
Kerrang!	3/5 stars

Live from the Battle in Seattle is the only album released by anti-globalization punk band The No WTO Combo. Of the five tracks on the album, only two, "New Feudalism" and "Electronic Plantation", are original songs. "Let's Lynch the Landlord" and "Full Metal Jackoff" are both covers, by Jello Biafra's former band Dead Kennedys, and D.O.A. featuring Biafra, respectively. "Battle in Seattle" is an opening speech/rallying cry by Jello Biafra. Biafra later re-recorded "New Feudalism" and "Electronic Plantation" for the album The Audacity of Hype by Jello Biafra and the Guantanamo School of Medicine.

== Track listing ==
1. "Battle in Seattle" – 15:02
2. "Let's Lynch the Landlord" – 3:41
3. "New Feudalism" – 4:15
4. "Electronic Plantation" – 4:55
5. "Full Metal Jackoff" – 16:28

== Personnel ==
- Jello Biafra – vocals
- Kim Thayil – guitar
- Krist Novoselic – bass
- Gina Mainwal – drums
- The No WTO Combo – Main Performer
- Shepard Fairey – CD Art Adaptation, Tray Photo, Cover Art Concept
- Tony Gale – Photography
- Jason Rosenberg – Construction
- Jack Endino – Mixing
- Jello Biafra – Package Concept
- Necessity – Producer
- Mark Cavener – Engineer / Producer
- Todd Robbins – Digital Editing
