= High Priest of Harmful Matter: Tales from the Trial =

High Priest of Harmful Matter: Tales From the Trial

Studio album by Jello Biafra
- Released: 1989
- Genre: Spoken word
- Length: 96:16
- Label: Alternative Tentacles
- Producer: Jello Biafra

Jello Biafra chronology
No More Cocoons (1987)	High Priest of Harmful Matter: Tales From the Trial (1989)	Last Scream of the Missing Neighbors (1989)

Professional ratings
Review scores
Source	Rating
Allmusic	2.5/5 stars

High Priest of Harmful Matter: Tales From the Trial is the second spoken word album by Jello Biafra. Biafra summarizes the recent history of censorship in America, focusing on crusades to ban subjects such as evolution from school textbooks. He reveals that some court cases on the subject were made to appear local and as if brought by ordinary citizens (for example, Mozert v. Hawkins City Board of Education), but were in fact spearheaded and funded by televangelists such as Pat Robertson. He also explains the part that Christian fundamentalist groups played in the creation of the Parents Music Resource Center. The second part of the record is devoted to Biafra's lively description of his own experience with the court system after complaints to law enforcement by the PMRC over the Dead Kennedys' Frankenchrist album.

== Track listing ==
Disc 1

No.	Title	Length
1.	"Intro - Love American Death Squad Style"	11:46
2.	"Talk on Censorship"	44:06
Total length:		55:52

Disc 2

No.	Title	Length
3.	"Tales From the Trial"	43:24
Total length:		43:24

Track 1 is a CD bonus track, taken from the compilation album Oops! Wrong Stereotype.
