= Carlo Cadona =

American musician (born c. 1958)

- Also known as: 6025
- Born: 1958 (age 67–68)
- Genres: Punk rock, post-punk
- Occupation: Guitarist
- Instruments: Guitar, effects pedals, synths
- Years active: 1978–1981

Carlo Cadona (born 1958 or 1959), also known by his stage name 6025, is an American musician who served as the second guitarist for the American punk rock band Dead Kennedys, from their formation in July 1978 to March 1979.

== Dead Kennedys (1978–1979) ==
Dead Kennedys vocalist Jello Biafra met Cadona, who dubbed himself 6025 from a clothing inspection ticket, at the Mabuhay Gardens, and asked him if he wanted to pose as the band's drummer. 6025 then told Biafra that he could play guitar, and was invited to the group, subsequently joining in July 1978. Although he is sometimes claimed to have been a drummer or singer, frontman Jello Biafra has stated that 6025 was recruited solely as a guitarist. The other members joined after answering an ad placed by East Bay Ray.

Biafra stated, "[A] week before our first gig we got a guitarist who called himself 6025 and he left about six months later". He actually parted with the band roughly eight months later, in March 1979. According to Biafra, he was the best all-around musician in the band; however, his taste for prog rock and idiosyncratic songwriting alienated him from the rest of the band. 6025's final live appearance with Dead Kennedys was on March 3, 1979. The performance was taped and a few tracks appeared on compilation before being officially released in its entirety 25 years later as Live at the Deaf Club.

During his time Cadona wrote many songs for The Dead Kennedys, including "Forward to Death" and "Ill in The Head" which are included on their debut. 6025 makes a rare studio recording appearance on Fresh Fruit for Rotting Vegetables where he plays rhythm guitar on "Ill in The Head". 6025 also wrote the music for "Short Songs", "Gaslight" and "Straight A's" which can be heard on Give Me Convenience or Give Me Death. Despite not having been in the band for years at that point, The Dead Kennedys included "Religious Vomit", a song 6025 wrote, on their In God We Trust, INC EP.

== Later life ==
Cadona made appearances as a guitarist for Ralph Records recording artist Snakefinger as documented on two live albums from 1980 and 81. In 1993, Cadona, who had returned to the Evangelical Christianity of his upbringing, complained to police about a performance by Marian Anderson of the Insaints at 924 Gilman Street, in which she allegedly performed sexual acts on stage. After a protracted court case, Anderson was acquitted.

Carlo Cadona surfaced again in an October 19, 2017 article in The Press Democrat titled “Shelters remain safe havens for Santa Rosans fleeing fires”. The article, which featured Santa Rosa citizens who were fleeing the wildfires, cited Cadona as a former member of the Dead Kennedys. In the article it stated he was evacuated from his Mark West Springs Road home of a dozen years as a result of the fires.

== Discography ==
=== Dead Kennedys ===
- 1980 – Fresh Fruit for Rotting Vegetables
- 1987 – Give Me Convenience or Give Me Death
- 2004 – Live at the Deaf Club

=== Snakefinger ===
- 2010 – Live at Hurrah 1980
- 2010 – Live at the Savoy 1981
