= In the Grip of Official Treason =

Live album by Jello Biafra
- Released: October 24, 2006
- Recorded: April 16, 2004 – July 23, 2006
- Genre: Spoken word
- Length: 234:09
- Label: Alternative Tentacles
- Producer: Jello Biafra

Jello Biafra chronology
Sieg Howdy! (2005)	In the Grip of Official Treason (2006)

Professional ratings
Review scores
Source	Rating
AllMusic	3/5 stars

In the Grip of Official Treason is the ninth spoken word album from Jello Biafra. It was released on October 24, 2006.

== Track listing ==
Disc 1

No.	Title	Length
1.	"Fat Mike Speaks"	2:15
2.	"Punk Voter Battle Cry"	24:15
3.	"Die for Oil, Sucker (T.W.O.T. Version)"	7:40
4.	"Ass Clowns in Toyland"	5:57
5.	"Junk Mail From Hell"	2:15
6.	"Der Gropenfurhrer Putsch"	9:40
7.	"And You Will Know Us by Our Trail of Cash"	4:41
8.	"Brown Lipstick Voodoo Ritual"	6:02
9.	"Forgotten Recent History Lessons"	11:52
10.	"Votes Disappear Like Magic"	4:26
Total length:		79:03

Disc 2

No.	Title	Length
11.	"Big Jim, the Cyber Crow"	3:19
12.	"Your Child Left Behind"	9:42
13.	"The Faux FEMA Follies"	8:55
14.	"Witness for the Prosecution"	4:31
15.	"Holiday in Guantanamo"	11:20
16.	"Weapons of Mass Distraction"	15:20
17.	"Mr. Hat's Mr. Hat"	11:29
18.	"Go Down on Me, Moses"	13:54
Total length:		78:30

Disc 3

No.	Title	Length
19.	"The Lord Is My Sheep"	2:12
20.	"The Last Big Gulp"	8:42
21.	"The Terror of Tinytown's Big Adventure"	3:02
22.	"Iraqnophobia"	13:15
23.	"The Curse of the Wolfman"	7:11
24.	"Bloodbath and Beyond"	3:29
25.	"Pirates of the Reconstruction"	9:49
26.	"The Flute and the Cobra"	5:36
27.	"And All I Got Were These Lousy Freedom Fries"	13:49
28.	"The Simplest Way Out Is Out"	3:28
29.	"Red State/Blue State Statik Attak"	2:45
30.	"American Idle"	5:33
Total length:		78:51

== Personnel ==
- Steve Austin – engineer
- Terry Campbell – contribution
- George Carlin – author
- Paul Dickerson – contribution
- Dennis Kane – engineer
- Marshall Lawless – producer
- John Yates – layout design, imaging
