= I Blow Minds for a Living =

Studio album by Jello Biafra
- Released: June 12, 1991
- Genre: Spoken word
- Length: 92:23
- Label: Alternative Tentacles
- Producer: Jello Biafra

Jello Biafra chronology
Last Scream of the Missing Neighbors (1989)	I Blow Minds for a Living (1991)	The Sky Is Falling and I Want My Mommy (1991)

Professional ratings
Review scores
Source	Rating
Allmusic	3.5/5 stars

I Blow Minds for a Living is the third spoken word album by Jello Biafra.

== Track listing ==
Disc 1

No.	Title	Length
1.	"Pledge of Allegiance"	4:02
2.	"Talk on Censorship-Let Us Prey"	17:02
3.	"Die For Oil, Sucker (Higher Octane Version)"	9:30
4.	"I Was a Teenage Pacifist"	1:23
5.	"If Voting Changed Anything..."	8:12
6.	"Running for Mayor"	21:29
Total length:		61:38

Disc 2

No.	Title	Length
7.	"Grow More Pot"	13:26
8.	"Lost Orgasm"	4:45
9.	"Talk on Censorship: Better Living Through New World Orders"	12:34
10.	"Talk on Censorship: Fear of a Free Planet"	26:59
Total length:		57:44
