= Last Scream of the Missing Neighbors =

Studio album by Jello Biafra & D.O.A.
- Released: 1990
- Genres: Punk rock; hardcore punk
- Length: 29:06
- Label: Alternative Tentacles
- Producers: Jello Biafra, Cecil English

Jello Biafra chronology
| High Priest of Harmful Matter: Tales From the Trial (1989) | Last Scream of the Missing Neighbors (1990) | I Blow Minds for a Living (1991) |

D.O.A. chronology
| True (North) Strong And Free (1987) | Last Scream of the Missing Neighbors (1989) | Murder (1990) |

Professional ratings
Review scores
| Source | Rating |
|---|---|
| AllMusic | 4.5/5 stars |
| Punknews.org | 4/5 stars |

Last Scream of the Missing Neighbors is a punk album by Jello Biafra of Dead Kennedys and Canadian band D.O.A., released in 1990. It is notable for "Full Metal Jackoff," a furious 14-minute song that touches on then-relevant topics such as Willie Horton, the Iran-Contra Affair, Oliver North, the crack epidemic, and many others.

"That's Progress" was included on the Rock Against Bush, Vol. 1 compilation on Fat Wreck Chords.

== Critical reception ==
Trouser Press praised the album, calling it "a roaring rock record that puts [Biafra's] trademark whiny vocals and songs to D.O.A.'s meat-and-cojones guitar power. Through a half-dozen numbers like "Wish I Was in El Salvador," "Attack of the Peacekeepers" and the epic "Full Metal Jackoff," Last Scream proudly re-hoists the DK flag in all but name."

== Track listing ==
All songs by Jello Biafra except where indicated.

1. "That's Progress" - 3:13
2. "Attack of the Peacekeepers" - 2:44
3. "Wish I Was in El Salvador" - 2:53
4. "Power Is Boring" (Jello Biafra, Joe Keithley) - 2:49
5. "We Gotta Get Out of This Place" (Barry Mann, Cynthia Weil; originally performed by The Animals) - 4:50
6. "Full Metal Jackoff" - 13:57

== Personnel ==
- Jello Biafra – lead vocals
- Joe Keithley – guitar, vocals
- Chris Prohom – guitar, vocals
- Brian Goble – bass
- Jon Card – drums
