= In God We Trust, Inc. =

EP by Dead Kennedys
- Released: December 1981
- Recorded: August 22, 1981
- Venues: Target Video, San Francisco
- Studios: Möbius Music, San Francisco
- Genre: Hardcore punk
- Length: 13:54
- Label: Alternative Tentacles
- Producers: East Bay Ray, Norm

Dead Kennedys chronology
Fresh Fruit for Rotting Vegetables (1980)	In God We Trust, Inc. (1981)	Plastic Surgery Disasters (1982)

Singles from In God We Trust, Inc.
- 1. "Nazi Punks Fuck Off" Released: November 1981

Professional ratings
Review scores
Source	Rating
About.com	5/5 stars
AllMusic	3/5 stars
The Austin Chronicle	4/5 stars
Christgau's Record Guide	B−
Drowned in Sound	8/10
The Encyclopedia of Popular Music	3/5 stars
Kerrang!	5/5 stars
NME	6/10
OndaRock	8/10
The Rolling Stone Album Guide	4/5 stars

In God We Trust, Inc. is the first and only EP by hardcore punk band Dead Kennedys and the first of the group's releases with drummer D. H. Peligro. The record is a screed against topics ranging from organized religion and Neo-Nazis, to the pesticide Kepone and the government indifference that worsened the effects of the Minamata disaster. In God We Trust, Inc. is also the first Dead Kennedys record released after the presidential election of Ronald Reagan and features the band's first references to Reagan, for which they—and hardcore punk as a genre—would become notorious.

== Background ==
During 1980 and 1981 the American punk scene saw an influx of 7-inch EPs from Washington D.C.'s Dischord Records from bands like Minor Threat and Teen Idles. These short, high-tempo records packed in as many as 10 songs each and helped define the 1980s genre of hardcore punk.

In wanting to pay tribute to this faster form of punk rock, and to showcase the talents of their new drummer D. H. Peligro, Dead Kennedys put together some new material and sped up a few songs that had only been heard on their 1978 demos and in early live shows. These songs became the basis for In God We Trust, Inc. Keeping with the rough-hewn style of D.C. hardcore, bits of tape leads announcing the take number and including drumstick clicks and count-offs precede many of the record's songs.

== Recording ==
Dead Kennedys initially recorded eight songs at Subterranean Studios on June 19, 1981. All tracks were recorded live without overdubs to ½" 8-track reel and with the band determining some of the songs' arrangements between takes. The session was videotaped by Joe Rees of Target Video with Mike Fox, the session engineer, sending the rough mix to the video feed. When the group took the tracks to be mixed, they discovered that the magnetic tape used for the recording was defective—the oxide surface of the tape began to peel during playback, thereby destroying the recordings. The band then re-recorded all eight songs on August 22 at Mobius Music, and these recordings were released on the EP.

Years later, enhanced restoration techniques allowed for five tracks to be recovered from the master tapes from the earlier Subterranean sessions. These, along with the rough video mixes of the remaining three songs, appear on the DVD The Lost Tapes.

== Songs ==
Much of the material on the EP was left over from earlier in the Dead Kennedys' career. Second guitarist 6025, who'd left the band in 1979, wrote the lead track, "Religious Vomit". The song "Kepone Factory" is a reworking of "Kepone Kids", which appeared on the group's 1978 demo tape. Alternate versions of "Moral Majority" and "Nazi Punks Fuck Off" were on a single packaged with an anti-fascist armband. "We've Got a Bigger Problem Now" is a rewritten version of the band's early single "California Über Alles". Originally a dig at California governor Jerry Brown, the band reworked the song to be about newly elected president Ronald Reagan and added an element of lounge music in contrast with the fast-tempo hardcore punk music on the rest of the record. The EP closes with a cover of the theme from the 1960s TV show Rawhide.

== Artwork and releases ==
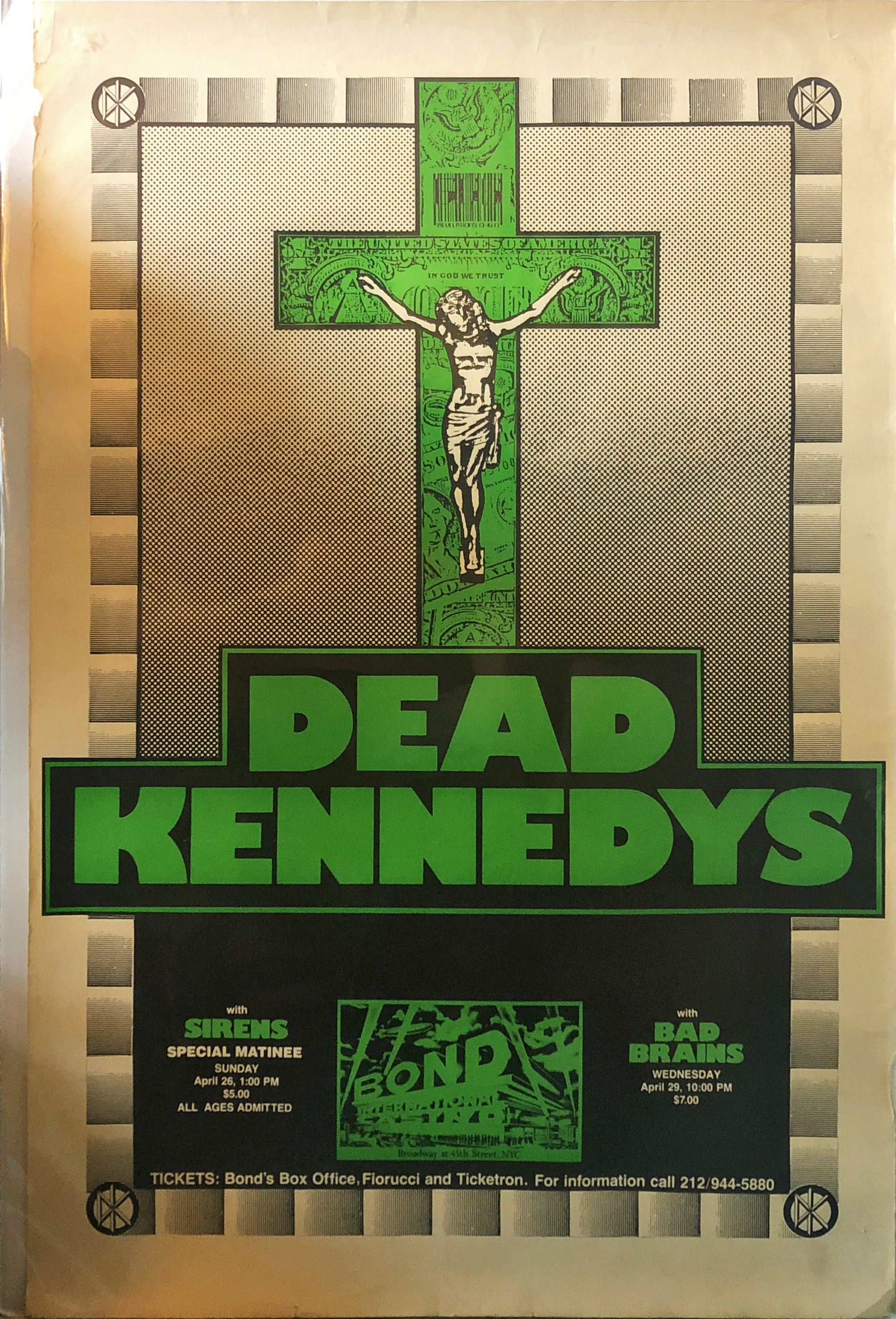
Dead Kennedys at Bond's NYC early 80's

The album cover depicts a golden Jesus crucified on a cross of dollar bills, with a background of a shiny metal material. The band released the record internationally in 1981 on their own Alternative Tentacles label, in partnership with various other independent record labels in North America, Europe, Australia and New Zealand. The original vinyl version's A-side comprised tracks 1–5, and Side B tracks 6–8.

The original cassette version compiled all 8 songs on Side A and left Side B intentionally devoid of any sound. Printed on the cassette's second side was the explanation, "Home taping is killing record industry profits! We left this side blank so you can help."

In God We Trust, Inc. first appeared on compact disc in 1985 as bonus material added to the Dead Kennedys' 1982 LP Plastic Surgery Disasters.

== Track listing ==
All tracks are written by Jello Biafra, except where noted.

Side A
No.	Title	Writer(s)	Length
1.	"Religious Vomit"	6025	1:04
2.	"Moral Majority"		1:55
3.	"Hyperactive Child"		0:37
4.	"Kepone Factory"		1:18
5.	"Dog Bite"	Klaus Flouride	1:13

Side B
No.	Title	Writer(s)	Length
6.	"Nazi Punks Fuck Off"		1:03
7.	"We've Got a Bigger Problem Now"	Biafra, John Greenway, East Bay Ray, Flouride, D. H. Peligro	4:29
8.	"Rawhide"	Ned Washington and Dimitri Tiomkin	2:11
Total length:			13:54

== Personnel ==
Dead Kennedys

- Jello Biafra – lead vocals, artwork
- East Bay Ray – guitar, backing vocals on "Moral Majority", producer
- Klaus Flouride – bass, backing vocals
- D. H. Peligro – drums

Additional performers

- Ninotchka (Therese Soder) – backing vocals on "Moral Majority"
- Annette Olesen – backing vocals on "Moral Majority"
- HyJean – backing vocals on "Moral Majority"
- Darvon – backing vocals on "Moral Majority"
- Siobhan – backing vocals on "Moral Majority"

Production

- Norm – producer, mixer
- Oliver Dicicco – engineer
- Annette Olesen – 2nd engineer
- Winston Smith – artwork

== Charts ==
Chart (1982)	Peak position
New Zealand Albums (RMNZ)	23
UK Independent Albums (OCC)	3

== Certifications ==
Region	Certification	Certified units/sales
United Kingdom (BPI)	Gold	100,000^{^}
^{^} Shipments figures based on certification alone.
