= Kill the Poor =

Single by Dead Kennedys

from the album Fresh Fruit for Rotting Vegetables
- B-side: "In-sight"
- Released: 24 October 1980
- Recorded: 1980
- Genre: Hardcore punk
- Length: 3:02
- Label: Cherry Red
- Songwriters: Jello Biafra; East Bay Ray
- Producers: Norm; East Bay Ray

Dead Kennedys singles chronology
"Holiday in Cambodia" (1980)	"Kill the Poor" (1980)	"Too Drunk to Fuck" (1981)

"Kill the Poor" is a song by Dead Kennedys, released in October 1980 on Cherry Red Records as the band's third single, with "In-sight" as its B-side. The song is a satire of the elite, saying how if given the chance, they would use neutron bombs to wipe out the impoverished whilst preserving property. The title track was re-recorded for the band's first album, Fresh Fruit for Rotting Vegetables (1980), although the single and album versions show little difference in comparison. The B-side of this single is also additionally on the compilation album Give Me Convenience or Give Me Death (1987). A special "disco version" was played and recorded on March 3, 1979, and released on their live album Live at the Deaf Club.

"Kill the Poor" reached #49 in the UK Singles Chart, spending three weeks on the chart.

== Personnel ==
- Jello Biafra – lead vocals
- East Bay Ray – guitar
- Klaus Flouride – bass, backing vocals
- Ted – drums

== Charts ==
Chart (1980)	Peak position
UK Indie Chart	1
UK Singles Chart	49

== Cover versions ==
- American metalcore band The Agony Scene covered the song for the special edition of their album Get Damned in 2007.
- American heavy metal band Trivium covered the song as part of a series of covers recorded during the recording session of their album The Sin and the Sentence in 2017.
- Russian punk band Pornofilmy covered the song with Russian translation named Нищих убивай (lit. 'Kill the poor') for their album Русская мечта. Часть 2 (lit. 'Russian Dream. Part 2') in 2016.
