= Rawhide (song) =

1958 Western song by Ned Washington and Dimitri Tiomkin

Song by Frankie Laine
- Language: English
- Length: 2:00
- Composer: Dimitri Tiomkin
- Lyricist: Ned Washington

"Rawhide" is a Western song written by Ned Washington (lyrics) and composed by Dimitri Tiomkin in 1958. It was originally recorded by Frankie Laine. The song was used as the theme to Rawhide, a western television series that ran on CBS from 1959 to 1965. Members of the Western Writers of America chose it as one of the Top 100 Western songs of all time.

== Background ==
The song is about the job of a drover on a cattle drive.

== Notable covers ==
- The Blues Brothers (on the soundtrack to their film The Blues Brothers)
- Frank Chacksfield and his Orchestra; the first bars of this instrumental version were used in a news jingle by Radio Veronica in the 1970s
- Frankie Laine (performed again with Jimmy Carroll and his orchestra); this version was used in an advertisement for Google Chrome in 2013
- The New Zealand Railways Department used a cover of the song in a 1978 television advertisement for its freight services

== See also ==
- Rawhide (TV series)
- Fedora Rawhide, a development tree of Fedora Linux whose name was influenced by this song.
