= Give Me Convenience or Give Me Death =

Compilation album by Dead Kennedys
- Released: June 1987
- Recorded: 1979–87
- Genres: Hardcore punk; punk rock
- Length: 51:26
- Label: Alternative Tentacles

Dead Kennedys chronology
Bedtime for Democracy (1986)	Give Me Convenience or Give Me Death (1987)	Mutiny on the Bay (2001)

Professional ratings
Review scores
Source	Rating
AbsolutePunk	(87%) link
AllMusic	link
Spin Alternative Record Guide	4/10

Give Me Convenience or Give Me Death (stylized as Give me convenience OR give me death) is a compilation album by the American hardcore punk band Dead Kennedys. It was released in June 1987 through front man Jello Biafra's record label Alternative Tentacles.

The image on its album cover is a composite of a 1950s Barbasol shaving cream ad and a 1946 famine in Calcutta.

== Overview ==
The album consists of songs (or in some cases, different versions of songs) that were not released on the band's studio albums. The original vinyl version had tracks 16 and 17 on an extra flexi disc. The album was certified gold by both BPI and the RIAA in December 2007. The title is a play on the ultimatum by Patrick Henry, "Give me liberty or give me death!", and is intended as a commentary on American consumerism. Give Me Convenience or Give Me Death was the last Dead Kennedys album that Biafra approved the production of, and their last album released through Alternative Tentacles.

The album includes "Pull My Strings", recorded live, which they played only once on March 25, 1980, at the Bay Area Music Awards ("BAMMIES") in front of music industry bigwigs to give the event some "new wave credibility". The band spent the day of the show practicing their increasingly popular "California Über Alles", the song they were asked to play. About 15 seconds into the song Jello Biafra said, "Hold it! We've gotta prove that we're adults now. We're not a punk rock band, we're a new wave band."

The band, who all wore white shirts with a big, black S painted on the front, pulled black ties from around the backs of their necks to form a dollar sign, then started playing "Pull My Strings", a satirical attack on the ethics of the mainstream music industry. The song also referenced the Knack's biggest hit, "My Sharona". The song was never recorded in the studio but this performance, the only time the song was ever performed, was included on the album.

Also included is "Night of the Living Rednecks", which was recorded during a show in Portland, Oregon in 1979 when East Bay Ray snapped a guitar string as the band finished their song "Chemical Warfare". While the guitar string was being replaced, Biafra vamped for time by telling a story, backed by Ted and Flouride performing a jazz-style instrumental, about how on the last trip the band made to Portland, where he had a confrontation with some "dumb rich kids" in a "life-size Hot Wheels car" that involved him throwing a rock at their vehicle after they sprayed water on him and later trapping himself in a telephone booth when they retaliated.

== Track listing ==
No.	Title	Writer(s)	Original appearance	Length
1.	"Police Truck"	Jello Biafra, East Bay Ray	"Holiday in Cambodia"	2:27
2.	"Too Drunk to Fuck"	Biafra	"Too Drunk to Fuck"	2:42
3.	"California über alles" (single version)	Biafra, John Greenway	"California über alles"	3:28
4.	"The Man with the Dogs"	Biafra	"California über alles"	3:04
5.	"Insight"	Biafra	"Kill the Poor"	1:42
6.	"Life Sentence"	Biafra	"Bleed for Me"	2:41
7.	"A Child and His Lawnmower"	Biafra	Not So Quiet on the Western Front	0:57
8.	"Holiday in Cambodia" (single version)	Dead Kennedys	"Holiday in Cambodia"	3:46
9.	"I Fought the Law"	Sonny Curtis, new lyrics: Biafra	Play New Rose for Me – Rose 100	2:21
10.	"Saturday Night Holocaust"	Dead Kennedys	"Halloween"	4:21
11.	"Pull My Strings" (live)	Biafra, Ted	March 25, 1980 – Bay Area Music Awards	5:47
12.	"Short Songs" (live)	6025	Can You Hear Me? Music from the Deaf Club	0:29
13.	"Straight A's" (live)	Biafra, 6025	Can You Hear Me? Music from the Deaf Club	2:15
14.	"Kinky Sex Makes the World Go 'Round"	Dead Kennedys	Wargasm	4:17
15.	"The Prey"	Biafra, Ray	"Too Drunk to Fuck"	3:50
16.	"Night of the Living Rednecks" (live)	Biafra, Flouride, Ted	November 19, 1979 – Earth Tavern, Portland, OR	5:14
17.	"Buzzbomb from Pasadena"	Biafra, Ray	N/A	2:22

== Personnel ==
- Jello Biafra – vocals, producer, artwork, compiler
- East Bay Ray – guitar, echoplex, producer, mixer
- Klaus Flouride – bass, backing vocals
- Bruce Slesinger (a.k.a. Ted) – drums (tracks 1–5, 8, 11–13, 15, 16), artwork
- D.H. Peligro – drums, backing vocals (tracks 6, 7, 9, 10, 14, 17)
- 6025 – rhythm guitar (tracks 12, 13)

=== Additional performers ===
- Ninotchka (Theresa Soder) – backing vocals on "Insight"

=== Production ===
- Thom Wilson – producer
- Geza X – producer, backing vocals
- Norm – producer
- Elliot Mazer – producer
- Jim Keylor – engineer
- John Cuniberti – producer, engineer
- Oliver Dicicco – mixer, engineer
- Pippin Youth – mixer
- Dee Dee Graves – artwork
- Winston Smith – artwork
- Jayed Scotti – artwork

== Charts ==
Chart (1987)	Peak position
UK Albums (Official Charts)	84
UK Independent Albums (OCC)	1

== Certifications ==
Region	Certification	Certified units/sales
United Kingdom (BPI)	Silver	60,000^{^}
United States (RIAA)	Gold	500,000^{^}
^{^} Shipments figures based on certification alone.
