= Halloween (Dead Kennedys song) =

1982 single by Dead Kennedys

Single by Dead Kennedys

from the album Plastic Surgery Disasters
- B-side: "Saturday Night Holocaust"
- Released: October 30, 1982
- Genre: Punk rock, Halloween music
- Length: 3:35
- Label: Alternative Tentacles
- Songwriters: Jello Biafra, East Bay Ray
- Producers: East Bay Ray, Thom Wilson

Dead Kennedys singles chronology
"Bleed for Me" (1982)	"Halloween" (1982)

"Halloween" is the seventh and final single by the American punk rock band Dead Kennedys, released on October 30, 1982. It appeared on the band's second album, Plastic Surgery Disasters, the following month. The song uses the practice of dressing up in Halloween costumes on Halloween as its subject matter in order to present themes of rejecting conformity.

== In popular culture ==
The song was used in the 2022 slasher film Halloween Ends.

== Charts ==
Chart (1982)	Peak position
UK Indie Chart	3
