= Plastic Surgery Disasters =

Studio album by Dead Kennedys
- Released: November 1982
- Recorded: June 1982
- Studios: Hyde St. and Möbius, San Francisco
- Genre: Hardcore punk
- Length: 42:49
- Labels: Alternative Tentacles; Faulty Products
- Producers: Dead Kennedys; Thom Wilson

Dead Kennedys chronology
In God We Trust, Inc. (1981)	Plastic Surgery Disasters (1982)	Frankenchrist (1985)

Professional ratings
Review scores
Source	Rating
About.com	5/5 stars
AllMusic	4.5/5 stars
The Austin Chronicle	4/5 stars
Drowned in Sound	8/10
The Encyclopedia of Popular Music	3/5 stars
Kerrang!	5/5 stars
OndaRock	7/10
The Rolling Stone Album Guide	3/5 stars
Spin Alternative Record Guide	4/10

Plastic Surgery Disasters is the second full-length album released by American punk rock band Dead Kennedys. Recorded in San Francisco during June 1982, it was produced by the band and punk record producer Thom Wilson, with Geza X getting a "special thanks" for additional production. (DK's guitarist East Bay Ray redundantly added his own name to the production credits on Manifesto reissues of the album.) The album is darker and more hardcore-influenced than their debut album Fresh Fruit for Rotting Vegetables as a result of the band trying to expand on the sound and mood they had achieved with their 1980 single "Holiday in Cambodia". It was the first full-length album to feature drummer D.H. Peligro, and is frontman Jello Biafra's favorite Dead Kennedys album.

According to Jello Biafra, the main musical influences for the album were Bauhaus, Les Baxter and the Groundhogs.

== Artwork ==
The album's cover features the band's name superimposed over the black-and-white photograph "Hands" by photojournalist Michael Wells. Wells's photo depicts the emaciated forearm and hand of a malnourished Ugandan child in the palm of a European missionary to highlight the horrors of famine in parts of the African continent during the 1970s and 80s. The same image was used by another San Francisco-based punk band called Society Dog for their 1981 EP .....Off of the Leash.

Most pressings of the album include a booklet containing lyrics and pieces of collage artwork by Biafra and Winston Smith that thematically tie in to the lyrics of each song on the album.

== Track listings ==
On the album's original vinyl and cassette releases, the A-side comprises tracks 1–8, ending with “Winnebago Warrior”, and the B-side tracks 9–13, kicking off with “Riot”. Some reissues parse out Melissa Webber's spoken intro to the album from the opening song, "Government Flu", and list it as a separate track entitled "Advice from Christmas Past". Similarly, Webber's spoken outro after "Moon over Marin" revisits "Advice from Christmas Past" and is listed as such on some editions of the album.

All tracks are written by Jello Biafra, except when specified.

Side A
No.	Title	Writer(s)	Length
1.	"Advice from Christmas Past"		0:55
2.	"Government Flu"		2:04
3.	"Terminal Preppie"		1:30
4.	"Trust Your Mechanic"		2:55
5.	"Well Paid Scientist"		2:21
6.	"Buzzbomb"	Biafra, East Bay Ray	2:21
7.	"Forest Fire"		2:22
8.	"Halloween"	Biafra, Ray	3:35
9.	"Winnebago Warrior"		2:09
Total length:			20:12

Side B
No.	Title	Writer(s)	Length
10.	"Riot"	Dead Kennedys	5:57
11.	"Bleed for Me"	Dead Kennedys	3:24
12.	"I Am the Owl"	Dead Kennedys	4:51
13.	"Dead End"	Ray	3:56
14.	"Moon over Marin"	Biafra, Ray	4:29
Total length:			22:37 (42:49)

The compact disc of the album has been reissued to include the EP In God We Trust, Inc. as eight tracks added onto its end and also appear on streaming versions of Plastic Surgery Disasters.

== Personnel ==
Dead Kennedys

- Jello Biafra – lead vocals
- East Bay Ray – guitars
- Klaus Flouride – bass, backing vocals, clarinet on "Terminal Preppie"
- D.H. Peligro – drums, backing vocals

Additional performers

- Dave Barrett – saxophone on "Terminal Preppie"
- Bruce Askley – saxophone on "Terminal Preppie"
- Melissa Webber – backing vocals (credited as "The Voice of Christmas Past")
- Ninotchka (Therese Soder) – backing vocals on "Forest Fire" and "Winnebago Warrior"

Production

- Thom Wilson – production
- East Bay Ray – production
- Oliver Dicicco – engineering
- John Cuniberti – engineering, mixing
- Winston Smith – artwork
- Jello Biafra – artwork

== Charts ==
Chart (1982)	Peak position
New Zealand Albums (RMNZ)	40
UK Independent Albums (OCC)	2

== Certifications ==
Region	Certification	Certified units/sales
United Kingdom (BPI)	Gold	100,000^{^}
^{^} Shipments figures based on certification alone.
