= Bleed for Me (Dead Kennedys song) =

"Bleed For Me"

Single by Dead Kennedys

from the album Plastic Surgery Disasters
- B-side: "Life Sentence"
- Released: July 1982
- Recorded: June 1982
- Genre: Hardcore punk
- Length: 3:24
- Label: Alternative Tentacles
- Songwriter(s): Dead Kennedys
- Producer(s): East Bay Ray, Thom Wilson

Dead Kennedys singles chronology
"'Nazi Punks Fuck Off!'" (1981)	"Bleed For Me" (1982)	"'Halloween'" (1982)

"Bleed for Me" (B-side "Life Sentence") was the sixth single by punk rock band Dead Kennedys. It was released in July 1982 on Alternative Tentacles. The music is cold and intimidating, and the lyrics describe kidnappings and torture carried out by the secret police of an unnamed anticommunist dictatorship. There follows a bridge, then the music becomes light and almost cheerful as the lyrics describe US foreign policy as utilizing murderous dictatorships to secure economic concessions that favor American corporations.

"Bleed for Me" also plays in the background of the Dead Kennedys' song "Kinky Sex (Makes the World Go 'Round)", in which an aide for the Reagan White House arranges World War III on the phone with Margaret Thatcher, who moans erotically at every new atrocity; this track may be a reference to the Thatchergate tape. The song was also performed for the film Urgh! A Music War, with a different bridge about Rosalynn Carter. During live performances with the Melvins in the 9/11-Afghanistan-Iraq War era, Jello substituted "Muslims" for "Russians" in the verse "So what's ten million dead, if it's keeping out the Russians?"

The song has also been covered by many bands, most notably Pearl Jam who have brought out the song for their 2005 tour, substituting the more time-appropriate lyric "cowboy Georgie" for "cowboy Ronnie", in reference to then-President George W. Bush.

The single version is different from that on Plastic Surgery Disasters.

== Charts ==
Chart (1982)	Peak position
UK Indie Chart	3

== See also ==
- Ronald Reagan in music
