= Fresh Fruit for Rotting Vegetables =

Studio album by Dead Kennedys
- Released: September 2, 1980
- Recorded: May–June 1980
- Studio: Möbius Music in San Francisco
- Genre: Hardcore punk
- Length: 32:52
- Labels: Cherry Red, Alternative Tentacles, Faulty Products, Manifesto
- Producers: Norm and East Bay Ray

Dead Kennedys chronology
Fresh Fruit for Rotting Vegetables (1980)	In God We Trust, Inc. (1981)

Singles from Fresh Fruit for Rotting Vegetables
- 1. "California Über Alles" Released: June 1979; 2. "Holiday in Cambodia" Released: May 1980; 3. "Kill the Poor" Released: October 1980

Fresh Fruit for Rotting Vegetables is the debut studio album by the American punk rock band Dead Kennedys. It was first released on September 2, 1980, through Cherry Red Records in the United Kingdom, and I.R.S. Records in the United States. It was later issued by Jello Biafra's own Alternative Tentacles label in the United States. It is the only Dead Kennedys studio album to feature drummer Bruce Slesinger and (on one track) guitarist Carlo Cadona.

== Recording and release ==
The photo on the front cover, showing several police cars on fire, was taken during the White Night riots of May 21, 1979, that resulted from the light sentence given to former San Francisco City Supervisor Dan White for the murder of Mayor George Moscone and Supervisor Harvey Milk. When Biafra ran for mayor, one of his policies had been for a statue to be erected to Dan White, and for eggs, tomatoes and stones to be available nearby for pelting it. In addition, the band's version of "I Fought the Law" has rewritten lyrics making reference to the incident.

== Reception ==
Professional ratings
Review scores
Source	Rating
AllMusic	5/5 stars
The Encyclopedia of Popular Music	4/5 stars
The Great Rock Discography	9/10
Mojo	4/5 stars
PopMatters	8/10
Q	4/5 stars
The Rolling Stone Album Guide	4/5 stars
Tiny Mix Tapes	5/5
Uncut	5/5 stars
The Village Voice	C+

Among contemporary reviews, Jon Young of Trouser Press found that the style and content of the album derived from the Sex Pistols and "will sound dated to the trend-conscious", but concluded that the album "may be the only legitimate companion piece to the Pistols' Never Mind the Bollocks". Young concluded that the album "works largely because of Jello Biafra, a distinctive and remarkable singer" who "thrives on extreme attitudes". Andy Gill of NME compared the album to music by the British punk group U.K. Subs, writing that Dead Kennedys "hardly come across as anything but smarter, both musically and intellectually ... Despite [the Dead Kennedys'] grasp of dynamics and their highly-ordered arrangements, there's really only one track here which makes effective use of their mannerisms and devices, and that's 'Holiday in Cambodia', already available in single form, and probably the biggest (musical) reason for this album's presence in the charts." Robert Christgau of The Village Voice stated that he found Biafra poor as a vocalist, likening his singing to Tiny Tim's.

The album was included in the book 1001 Albums You Must Hear Before You Die. In 2013, NME ranked it at number 365 in its list of the 500 Greatest Albums of All Time.

In 2010, it was certified diamond by the Independent Music Companies Association which indicated sales of at least 250,000 copies throughout Europe.

== Release variations ==
- The original back cover featured a found photograph of an old lounge band called Sounds of Sunshine, with Dead Kennedys' logo pasted onto the drum kit and skulls and crossbones spliced onto their instruments. The original photograph, as found by Flouride at a garage sale, had no identifying remarks on it whatsoever, and was used because the band thought it was "hilarious". Somehow, Warner Wilder, the former vocalist of the defunct lounge band, learned of the photo and threatened to sue Dead Kennedys. The back cover was reprinted with the heads of the band members cut off, but this solution was found to be unsatisfactory to Sounds of Sunshine, forcing an entirely different photo of four old people in a living room (with the Alternative Tentacles bat mascot pasted over a picture frame). When Cleopatra Records reissued Fresh Fruit for Rotting Vegetables in 2002, the original unbeheaded lounge band picture reappeared. The 25th Anniversary "Deluxe Reissue" co-released by Cherry Red Records and Manifesto Records in 2005 used the old people photograph, but with Dead Kennedys' logo substituted for the Alternative Tentacles Bat.
- Early I.R.S. pressings featured the cover tinted orange with black lettering. This cover variation was not authorized by the band. According to a late '80s interview Biafra did with Goldmine magazine, I.R.S. told the band they wanted to make the domestic version different from the Cherry Red import, to which Biafra claimed to have told I.R.S., "Yeah, inferior to the original — change it back!" During a 1981 performance at the 9:30 Club in Washington, D.C., Biafra mentions, "Some of you stooped so low as to buy our wonderful album, even with the shitty Disneyland orange cover which was not our idea."
- Post-I.R.S., pre-Alternative Tentacles pressings on I.R.S.'s Faulty Products subsidiary added "Police Truck" to the middle of the Side A sequence, between "Let's Lynch the Landlord" and "Drug Me".
- Some Cherry Red vinyl pressings added "Too Drunk to Fuck" to the end of Side A.
- Pirate pressings of Fresh Fruit for Rotting Vegetables (as well as the next two Dead Kennedys releases, In God We Trust Inc. and Plastic Surgery Disasters) were manufactured in Italy, Spain and Portugal. According to Biafra, these pressings were manufactured by someone who retained the master parts from defunct Italian licensees and put out what Biafra described as "Clorox bottle-quality pressings". These pressings were sold by a cut-out distributor to record stores that were, in Biafra's words, "too snooty" to deal with the independent distributors that Alternative Tentacles dealt with.
- The run-out groove of the early Alternative Tentacles pressings as well as early Cherry Red pressings includes the text "Well?? Who are the Brain Police???"—a reference to the song "Who Are the Brain Police?" by the Mothers of Invention.
- Manifesto Records released a fully remixed version of Fresh Fruit in September of 2022, remixed by Chris Lord-Alge. The release, instigated by the band member partnership's manager (who had personal ties with Lord-Alge) and approved by band members Ray Pepperell, Klaus Flouride and Darren Henley (the latter of whom was not a member of the band at the time), was criticized by Biafra in a July 2022 press release. Biafra also noted that, while respecting Lord-Alge's track record, did not feel Lord-Alge was the right person to remix any Dead Kennedys material.

== Track listing ==
All tracks are written by Jello Biafra, except where noted.

Side A
No.	Title	Writer(s)	Length
1.	"Kill the Poor"	Biafra, East Bay Ray	3:07
2.	"Forward to Death"	6025	1:23
3.	"When Ya Get Drafted"		1:23
4.	"Let's Lynch the Landlord"		2:13
5.	"Drug Me"		1:56
6.	"Your Emotions"	Ray	1:20
7.	"Chemical Warfare"		2:55
Total length:			14:17

Side B
No.	Title	Writer(s)	Length
1.	"California Über Alles"	Biafra, John Greenway	3:03
2.	"I Kill Children"		2:04
3.	"Stealing People's Mail"		1:34
4.	"Funland at the Beach"		1:49
5.	"Ill in the Head"	6025, Biafra	2:46
6.	"Holiday in Cambodia"	Dead Kennedys	4:37
7.	"Viva Las Vegas" (Elvis Presley cover with altered lyrics)	Doc Pomus, Mort Shuman	2:42
Total length:			18:35 (32:52)

== Fresh Fruit for Rotting Eyeballs ==
Fresh Fruit for Rotting Eyeballs is the accompanying 55-minute documentary, directed by Eric S. Goodfield, that is included with the Fresh Fruit for Rotting Vegetables 25th Anniversary Edition. It features a brief history of Dead Kennedys' early years up to their first UK tour, never before seen live performances, interviews with Klaus Flouride and East Bay Ray, comments by music journalists, and insights from the key people involved with the recording of Fresh Fruit for Rotting Vegetables. The video omits references to the origins of songs that would include a mention of Jello Biafra, although his 1979 run for mayor is highlighted.

== Personnel ==
Personnel adapted from Fresh Fruit for Rotting Vegetables liner notes.

Dead Kennedys

- Jello Biafra – lead vocals
- East Bay Ray – guitar
- Klaus Flouride – bass guitar, backing vocals
- Ted – drums

Additional performers

- 6025 – rhythm guitar on "Ill in the Head"
- Paul Roessler – keyboards on "Drug Me" and "Stealing People's Mail"
- Ninotchka (Therese Soder) – keyboards on "Drug Me", backing vocals on "Chemical Warfare"
- Dirk Dirksen – backing vocals on "Chemical Warfare"
- Bobby Unrest – backing vocals on "Chemical Warfare"
- Michael Synder – backing vocals on "Chemical Warfare"
- Bruce Calderwood – backing vocals on "Chemical Warfare"
- Barbara Hellbent – backing vocals on "Chemical Warfare"
- HyJean – backing vocals on "Chemical Warfare"
- Curt – backing vocals on "Chemical Warfare"
- Chi Chi – backing vocals on "Chemical Warfare"

Production

- Norm – production
- East Bay Ray – production
- Oliver DiCicco and John Cuniberti – engineering, mixing
- Kevin Metcalfe; Paul Stubblebine – mastering
- Judith Calson – front cover photography
- Winston Smith – artwork
- Annie Horwood – artwork
- Jello Biafra – artwork

== Charts ==
Chart (1980–1981)	Peak position
Australian Albums (Kent Music Report)	98
New Zealand Albums (RMNZ)	33
UK Albums (Official Charts)	30
UK Independent Albums (OCC)	2

Chart (2022)	Peak position
Scottish Albums (Official Charts)	36
UK Independent Albums (Official Charts)	22

== Certifications ==
Region	Certification	Certified units/sales
United Kingdom (BPI)	Gold	100,000^{^}
United States (RIAA)	Gold	500,000^{‡}
^{^} Shipments figures based on certification alone.^{‡} Sales+streaming figures based on certification alone.
