= Bruce Slesinger =

American drummer

- Genre: Punk rock
- Instrument: Drums
- Formerly of: Dead Kennedys

Bruce Slesinger, better known by his stage name Ted, is an American musician and architect who was the first drummer for Dead Kennedys.

== Dead Kennedys ==
Slesinger drummed for the San Francisco punk band, the Dead Kennedys, from July 1978 to February 1981. He played drums on their early singles, as well as their first album, Fresh Fruit for Rotting Vegetables. Slesinger co-wrote their second single, "Holiday in Cambodia", in conjunction with the rest of the group, and "Pull My Strings", a song written with lead singer and primary songwriter Jello Biafra specifically for the 1980 Bay Area Music Awards. He also played on their track "Night of the Living Rednecks", in which Dead Kennedys' guitarist East Bay Ray's guitar "breaks" and the band begins playing in a bebop style, while Biafra tells about his encounter with some jocks.

Slesinger left the band as he wanted to pursue a career in architecture, and was replaced by D.H. Peligro.

== Life outside music ==
Slesinger is a partner of the San Francisco architecture and design firm Bruce and Tom Design Partners, which he co-founded in 1993.
