= Too Drunk to Fuck =

Single by Dead Kennedys
- B-side: "The Prey"
- Released: May 1981
- Genre: Hardcore punk Surf punk
- Length: 2:40
- Label: Cherry Red
- Songwriter: Jello Biafra

Dead Kennedys singles chronology
"Kill the Poor" (1980)	"Too Drunk to Fuck" (1981)	"Nazi Punks Fuck Off" (1981)

"Too Drunk to Fuck" is the fourth single by Dead Kennedys. The record was released in May 1981 on Cherry Red Records with "The Prey" as the B-side. Both songs from this single are available on the rarities album Give Me Convenience or Give Me Death (1987).

The single reached Number 36 in the UK Singles Chart, although it was not stocked in some record shops because of its provocative title. It was the first UK Top 40 single to include the word "fuck" in its title. It was banned from Radio 1 airplay by the BBC. In chart listings, it was usually referred to as "Too Drunk To". When it reached the Top 40, presenter Tony Blackburn referred to it simply as "a record by a group calling themselves The Dead Kennedys". Dead Kennedys supplied a sticker for some record stores who took offense to the title which said, "Caution: You are the victim of yet another stodgy retailer afraid to warp your mind by revealing the title of this record so peel slowly and see..."

The song features satirical lyrics by Jello Biafra that paint a trenchant picture of an outrageous, moronic party, set to a heavy surf rock/garage rock riff by guitarist East Bay Ray. "A very difficult riff to play… very, very fast," observed comedian Bill Bailey, who covered the song with his punk band Beergut 100. "You cannot play it even if you've had [only] half a lager." The song ends with a sound of a man vomiting.

== Licensing controversy ==
After the rest of the band were awarded the rights to the Dead Kennedys material, they licensed "Too Drunk to Fuck" for use in the 2007 film Planet Terror. Almost immediately, Biafra criticized his former bandmates, specifically citing the song (a cover by Nouvelle Vague) being used in a rape scene in the movie, saying, "Some people will do anything for money." The rest of the band responded in kind, challenging him to donate his share of the money to charity.

== Personnel ==
- Jello Biafra – vocals,
- East Bay Ray – guitar
- Klaus Flouride – bass, backing vocals
- Ted – drums
- Geza X – producer

== Charts ==
Chart (1981)	Peak position
UK Indie Chart	1
UK Singles Chart	36
