= Police Truck =

Single by Dead Kennedys
- A-side: "Holiday in Cambodia"
- Released: May 1980
- Genre: Hardcore punk, surf punk
- Length: 2:24
- Label: Cherry Red; Alternative Tentacles
- Songwriters: Jello Biafra; East Bay Ray
- Producer: Dead Kennedys

Dead Kennedys singles chronology
"California Über Alles" (1979)	"Holiday in Cambodia" / "Police Truck" (1980)	"Kill the Poor" (1980)

"Police Truck" is a song by the American punk rock band Dead Kennedys. It was originally released in May 1980 as the B-side of the "Holiday in Cambodia" single and later released in June 1987 as the opening track on the band's compilation album Give Me Convenience or Give Me Death.

The song is a satirical attack on the actions of two police officers and takes a first-person view from the authorities themselves. It was inspired by an incident that occurred in Oakland in the late 1970s. It also functions more generally as an attack on police corruption.

"Police Truck" was one of the Kennedys' early popular songs. The song is built around a surf rock beat (similar to ones heard in the early instrumental surf singles such as the Chantays' "Pipeline"), and highlighted by East Bay Ray's echoed guitar leads and the descending chorus "ride, ride, how we ride." "Police Truck", like many of the band's songs, serves as an example of the Dead Kennedys' ability to portray a disturbing scenario through humorous lyrics.

== In popular culture ==
The song appeared in the soundtrack of the popular skateboarding video game Tony Hawk's Pro Skater, after being licensed by the former Dead Kennedys. This licensing caused criticism from many Dead Kennedys fans, who used it to assert that East Bay Ray, Klaus Flouride, and D.H. Peligro are no longer committed to the band's anti-corporate beliefs, unlike vocalist Jello Biafra; however, Alternative Tentacles gave approval for the song to appear in the game. Biafra denies that this happened. The song appears as a cover in the game Guitar Hero Encore: Rocks the 80s with altered lyrics (the word "drunks" at the beginning of the song is replaced by "punks", while "ass" is replaced by "butt", "shit" is replaced by "stool" and "suck my dick" is replaced by "take your pick"). This song is also available along with "California über alles" and "Holiday in Cambodia" for the Rock Band video game series as downloadable content.

In 2021, the band Punk Rock Karaoke and actor Wil Wheaton covered the track. In 2022, thrash metal band Megadeth released a cover of the track on their album The Sick, the Dying... and the Dead!
