= Nazi Punks Fuck Off =

1981 single by Dead Kennedys

Single by Dead Kennedys

from the EP In God We Trust, Inc.
- B-side: "Moral Majority"
- Released: November 1981
- Recorded: 1981
- Studio: Möbius Music (San Francisco)
- Genre: Hardcore punk
- Length: 1:03
- Label: Alternative Tentacles
- Songwriter: Jello Biafra
- Producer: Oliver DiCicco

Dead Kennedys singles chronology
"Too Drunk to Fuck" (1981)	"Nazi Punks Fuck Off" (1981)	"Bleed for Me" (1982)

"Nazi Punks Fuck Off" is a song by American punk rock band Dead Kennedys. It was released in November 1981 through Alternative Tentacles as a 7-inch single with "Moral Majority" as the B-side. Both are from the In God We Trust, Inc. EP, although the EP version is a different recording from the single version. The single included a free armband with a crossed-out swastika. The design was later adopted as a symbol for the anti-racist punk movement Anti-Racist Action.

== Composition ==
While some have claimed the song was written as a reaction to far-right punk subcultures such as Nazi punk or the white power skinhead movement, Jello Biafra has stated the initial premise of the song was about violence at punk shows, summarizing it as, "You violent people at shows are acting like a bunch of Nazis". The lyrics condemn the infighting among punks for weakening the prospect of rebelling against far-right agitators, and that "in a real Fourth Reich, [they'd] be the first to go."

In the opening of the In God We Trust, Inc. version of "Nazi Punks Fuck Off", lead singer Jello Biafra mentions English producer Martin Hannett, who had worked with Joy Division and Buzzcocks, accusing him, tongue-in-cheek, of having "overproduced" the recording. Hannett, in fact, did not work with the Dead Kennedys.

== Personnel ==
- Jello Biafra – lead vocals
- East Bay Ray – guitar
- Klaus Flouride – bass, backing vocals
- D. H. Peligro – drums

== Charts ==
Chart (1982)	Peak position
UK Indie Chart	11

== Cover versions ==
- The English grindcore band Napalm Death recorded a cover for their 1993 EP of the same name.
- The fictional band The Ain't Rights performed a cover of the song in a modern-day white supremacist club in the 2015 horror film Green Room.
- Original lyricist Biafra rewrote the song as "Nazi Trumps Fuck Off" in 2017; he performed it live with the crossover thrash group Dead Cross.
