= Holiday in Cambodia =

1980 song by Dead Kennedys

Single by Dead Kennedys

from the album Fresh Fruit for Rotting Vegetables
- B-side: "Police Truck"
- Released: May 1980
- Recorded: May–June 1980
- Genre: Hardcore punk; surf punk
- Length: 3:43 (single version); 4:37 (album version)
- Label: Optional; Cherry Red
- Composers: Jello Biafra; East Bay Ray; Klaus Flouride; Ted
- Lyricist: Jello Biafra
- Producer: Geza X

Dead Kennedys singles chronology
"California Über Alles" (1979)	"Holiday in Cambodia" (1980)	"Kill the Poor" (1980)

"Holiday in Cambodia" is a song by American punk rock band Dead Kennedys. The record was released as the group's second single in May 1980 by Optional Music with "Police Truck" as the B-side. The photograph on the front cover of the single was taken by Associated Press photographer Neal Ulevich at the Thammasat University massacre in Thailand, depicting a crowd member beating the hanged corpse of a student protester with a metal chair.

The song was re-recorded for the band's first album, Fresh Fruit for Rotting Vegetables (1980); the original recording of the song, as well as the single's B-side, are available on the compilation album Give Me Convenience or Give Me Death (1987).

== Composition ==
The song was written shortly after the Cambodian genocide by the Khmer Rouge, which is estimated to have been responsible for the deaths of roughly a quarter of the Cambodian population between 1975 and 1979. The lyrics are critical of disingenuous college-aged students in the Western world, contrasting their lifestyle with that of those under the Cambodian regime. The official video-clip shows American soldiers in helicopter, some chased by crowd, bombings including U.S. Air Force napalm bombing, and people burned by napalm, in reference to Operation Menu.

The re-recording of this song that appears on Fresh Fruit for Rotting Vegetables is different from the single version, being fifty-five seconds longer, at a higher tempo and featuring an extended, surf-influenced intro, as well as an extended bridge and guitar solo.

== Personnel ==
- Jello Biafra – lead vocals
- East Bay Ray – guitar
- Klaus Flouride – bass, backing vocals
- Ted – drums

== Lawsuit ==
In October 1998, Jello Biafra was sued by three former members of Dead Kennedys, who claimed that they had been defrauded of royalties owed to them. "The record industry has been skimming royalties owed artists since the beginning," according to Dead Kennedys' guitarist East Bay Ray. "This case is no different from blues musicians being taken advantage of in the twenties and thirties ... [T]here is no denying we were the victims here." According to Biafra, the suit was the result of his refusal to allow "Holiday in Cambodia" to be used in a commercial for Levi's Dockers; Biafra opposes Levi's due to what he believes are their unfair business practices and sweatshop labor. Biafra lost the lawsuit and, as the owner of Alternative Tentacles, was ordered to pay $200,000 in damages to the other band members.

== Charts ==
Chart (1980)	Peak position
UK Indie (Official Charts Company)	2
