= California Über Alles =

1979 single by Dead Kennedys

Single by Dead Kennedys

from the album Fresh Fruit for Rotting Vegetables
- B-side: "The Man with the Dogs"
- Released: June 1979
- Genre: Punk rock; surf punk; hardcore punk
- Length: 3:26 (single version); 3:03 (album version)
- Label: Alternative Tentacles (US); Fast Product (UK)
- Composer: Jello Biafra
- Lyricists: Jello Biafra; John Greenway
- Producer: Dead Kennedys

Dead Kennedys singles chronology
"California Über Alles" (1979)	"Holiday in Cambodia" (1980)

"California Über Alles" is the debut single by American punk rock band Dead Kennedys. It was the group's first recording and was released in June 1979 on the Optional Music label, with "The Man with the Dogs" appearing as its B-side. The title track was re-recorded in 1980 for the band's debut album, Fresh Fruit for Rotting Vegetables, and the original recording as well as the B-side were later included on the 1987 compilation Give Me Convenience or Give Me Death.

== Meaning ==
The lyrics were written by Jello Biafra and John Greenway for their band The Healers. Biafra composed the music in one of his rare attempts at composing on bass.

The title is an allusion to the first stanza of the national anthem of Germany, which begins with the words "Deutschland, Deutschland über alles" ("Germany, Germany above everything"). After the end of the Third Reich in 1945, the anthem was shortened to just the third stanza of the original song, as this passage is sometimes associated with Nazism and, in following, claims a large area of land that is no longer contained within the current borders of Germany.

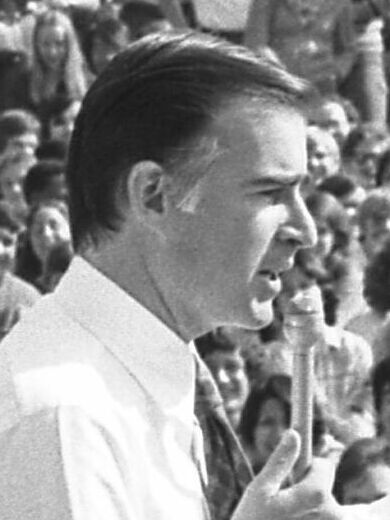
Jerry Brown, the song's subject, in 1978

The lyrics are a pointed, satirical attack on Jerry Brown, the Governor of California from 1975 to 1983 (and later 2011–2019), and are sung from his perspective, as an imaginary version of Brown outlines a hippie-fascist vision of America. The line "Serpent's egg already hatched" is a reference to a comment on the corrosive nature of power from William Shakespeare's play Julius Caesar, and also a reference to the Ingmar Bergman film The Serpent's Egg set in 1920s Berlin that gets its title from the Shakespeare play. The lines "Big Bro on white horse is near" and "now it is 1984" refer respectively to a statement Brown made during his first governorship that Americans were supposedly looking for "a leader on a white horse", and to the totalitarian regime of George Orwell's classic novel Nineteen Eighty-Four to describe a future (from a 1979 perspective) where Jerry Brown has become president, and his "suede/denim secret police" kill "uncool" people in "organic poison gas" chambers.

After the song's initial release, mild confusion arose in the Bay Area music scene as to why Biafra (who was outspoken about his far-left political views) was targeting Jerry Brown (a notably liberal politician for the time). Brown succeeded Ronald Reagan as governor of California, and Reagan was a seemingly more obvious target. However, Biafra frequently expressed his disdain for hippies, and the Dead Kennedys often satirized both left-wing and right-wing politicians.

The song is also an early example of Dead Kennedys' style, with heavy surf rock and militaristic overtones. It begins with sinister military-style drums, joined by an ominous bass riff. Biafra paints the scene in low, sneering tones before bursting into the manic chanted chorus; after two verses and choruses, the song shifts into a slower middle eight section set to a martial drumbeat over which Jello Biafra imagines the nightmarish actions of Brown's SS-styled secret police ("Come quietly to the camp; you'd look nice as a drawstring lamp," a reference to the allegation that lampshades were made from human skin during the Holocaust). The pace speeds up as it approaches the last iteration of the chorus, closing with a repeated chord sequence accompanied by a final burst of explosive drums.

German-American author Gero Hoschek was inspired by the song to title a 1988 magazine piece about the "Golden State" in the German Zeit Magazin weekly titled "Kalifornia Über Alles!" as well as a never–produced screenplay. Biafra complained, and was provided with a copy of the movie script, which he read and liked; understanding that there was no copyright violation, he gave Hoscheck permission to use the similar name.

== Personnel ==
- Jello Biafra – lead vocals
- East Bay Ray – guitar
- Klaus Flouride – bass, backing vocals
- Ted – drums

== Alternative versions ==
The original, improvised version (containing familiar lyrics but different music performed by the Dancing Assholes and Biafra's first band, The Healers) is included as the final track on the vinyl version of the "Rocky Mountain Low" compilation.

The version recorded for Fresh Fruit for Rotting Vegetables was played slightly faster, featuring a much more strident vocal from Biafra and a fuller, more confrontational sound altogether than the single mix.

On their EP In God We Trust, Inc., they recorded an updated version of the song, titled "We've Got a Bigger Problem Now", about then-President Ronald Reagan, including a lounge-jazz introduction, different lyrics, and several verses set at a much slower pace. A live version of the song was recorded with the instrumentals of the original version of the song.

Jello Biafra has made satirical references to the song in his political advocacy. A speech of his appears on the spoken word album Mob Action Against the State that is entitled "We've Got a Bigger Problem Now: War, Terrorism & Beyond". After the election of Arnold Schwarzenegger as governor of California, Biafra commented, "California Über Alles indeed".

Another updated version of this song about Governor Schwarzenegger, called "Kali-Fornia Über Alles 21st Century", was performed live (among a few other Dead Kennedys classics) when Biafra toured with the band Melvins to support their collaboration album in 2004. A live recording of this new version appears on their second collaborative effort, Sieg Howdy!.

Fans of Dulwich Hamlet F.C. in South London also regularly sing a version of the song as a tribute to their longest-serving manager - Gavin Rose. Many of the words are replaced in this version, e.g. "Dulwich Hamlet" instead of "California".

== Charts ==
Chart (1980)	Peak position
UK Indie Chart	4

== See also ==
- Ronald Reagan in music
