= Jello Biafra =

American singer, poet and activist (born 1958)

- Biafra performing at the 2014 Fun Fun Fun Fest

Background information
- Also known as: Count Ringworm; Jr. Hozicon
- Born: Eric Reed Boucher; June 17, 1958 (age 68); Boulder, Colorado, U.S.
- Genres: Punk rock; spoken word; hardcore punk
- Occupations: Singer; poet; activist
- Years active: 1976–present
- Label: Alternative Tentacles
- Member of: Lard; Jello Biafra and the Guantanamo School of Medicine
- Formerly of: Dead Kennedys; Witch Trials; Tumor Circus; No WTO Combo; Brujeria

Eric Reed Boucher (born June 17, 1958), known professionally as Jello Biafra, is an American singer, poet and political activist. He is the former lead singer and songwriter for the San Francisco punk rock band Dead Kennedys.

Initially active from 1978 to 1986, Dead Kennedys were known for rapid-fire music topped with Biafra's sardonic lyrics and biting social commentary, delivered in his "unique quiver of a voice". When the band broke up in 1986, he took over the influential independent record label Alternative Tentacles, which he had founded in 1979 with Dead Kennedys bandmate East Bay Ray. In 2000, a San Francisco jury found that Biafra and Alternative Tentacles had underpaid royalties to his former bandmates and awarded nearly $200,000 in actual damages plus $20,000 in punitive damages; the award was upheld by the California Court of Appeal in 2003. Although now focused primarily on spoken word performances, Biafra has continued as a musician in numerous collaborations. From 1979 to 1981, he contributed to the San Francisco punk zine Damage. He has also occasionally appeared in cameo roles in films.

Biafra has a history of political activity. He is a member of the Green Party of the United States and ran for the party's presidential nomination in the 2000 presidential election, finishing a distant second to Ralph Nader. In 1979 he ran for mayor of San Francisco, California. He is a supporter of a free society and utilizes shock value and advocates direct action and pranksterism in the name of political causes. Biafra uses absurdist media tactics, in the leftist tradition of the Yippies, to highlight issues of civil rights and social justice.

== Early life ==
Eric Reed Boucher was born in Boulder, Colorado, the son of Virginia Boucher (née Parker), a librarian, and Stanley Wayne Boucher, a psychiatric social worker and poet. His sister, Julie J. Boucher, was associate director of the Library Research Service at the Colorado State University Library; she died in a mountain-climbing accident on October 12, 1996.

As a child, Boucher developed an interest in international politics, encouraged by his parents. He became a fan of rock music after his parents accidentally tuned in to a rock radio station. As a teenager, his high school guidance counselor advised him to spend his adolescence preparing to become a dental hygienist.

== Musical career ==
=== Colorado bands ===
In 1977, he worked as a road crew member for a local band called the Ravers — later called The Nails — helping set up their equipment at shows, including as an opener for the Ramones. The job ended shortly after the Ramones show, when the Ravers were offered a record contract and left Colorado. Boucher credits seeing Joey Ramone as inspiration to become a singer, and the Ramones lyrics for inspiring the use of humor in his own songs.

Shortly after graduating from high school, he formed a band called the Healers, with John Greenway and a third musician. Boucher has described the Healers' music as "banging on instruments we didn't know how to play when our parents weren't home". While never playing a show, the band made recordings, including an early version of "California Über Alles", but did not want any of it to be released to the public. Some of their music was made available on a 2009 compilation of late 1970s Colorado punk bands titled Rocky Mountain Low, including the original version of "California Über Alles", which Maximum Rocknroll described as experimental improv in their review.

Boucher left Boulder to attend the University of California, Santa Cruz but dropped out after the first quarter of the school year.

=== Dead Kennedys ===
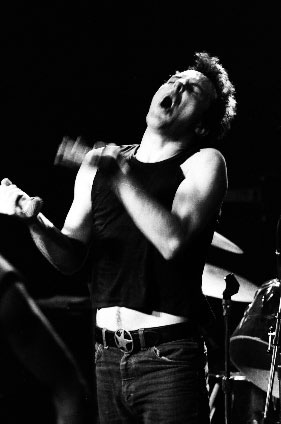
Biafra performing with Dead Kennedys

In June 1978, Boucher responded to an advertisement placed in a store by guitarist East Bay Ray, stating "guitarist wants to form punk band", and together they formed Dead Kennedys. He began performing with the band under the stage name Occupant, but soon began to use the stage name Jello Biafra, a combination of the brand name Jell-O and the short-lived African state of Biafra.

Biafra initially attempted to compose music on guitar, but his lack of experience on the instrument and his own admission of being "a fumbler with my hands" led Dead Kennedys bassist Klaus Flouride to suggest that Biafra simply sing the parts he envisioned to the band. Biafra sang his riffs and melodies into a tape recorder, which he brought to the band's rehearsal and/or recording sessions. By all accounts, including his own, Biafra is not a conventionally skilled musician, though he and his collaborators (Joey Shithead of D.O.A. in particular) attest that he is a skilled composer and his work, particularly with Dead Kennedys, is highly respected by punk-oriented critics and fans.

Holiday in Cambodia
"Holiday in Cambodia" by Dead Kennedys from Fresh Fruit for Rotting Vegetables

The first single by Dead Kennedys was "California Über Alles". The song, which spoofed California governor Jerry Brown, was the first of many political songs by the group and Biafra. Its popularity resulted in being covered by other musicians, such as the Disposable Heroes of Hiphoprisy (who rewrote the lyrics to parody Pete Wilson), John Linnell of They Might Be Giants and Six Feet Under on their Graveyard Classics album of cover versions. Not long after, Dead Kennedys had a second and bigger hit with "Holiday in Cambodia" from their debut album Fresh Fruit for Rotting Vegetables. AllMusic cites this song as "possibly the most successful single of the American hardcore scene" and Biafra counts it as his personal favorite Dead Kennedy's song.

Dead Kennedys received some controversy in the spring of 1981 over the single "Too Drunk to Fuck". The song became a hit in Britain, and the BBC feared that it would manage to be a big enough hit to appear among the top 30 songs on the national charts, requiring a mention on Top of the Pops. However, the single peaked at number 36 in the charts.

The EP In God We Trust, Inc. contained the song "Nazi Punks Fuck Off" as well as "We've Got A Bigger Problem Now", a rewritten version of "California Über Alles" about Ronald Reagan. Punk musician and scholar Vic Bondi considers the latter song to be the song that "defined the lyrical agenda of much of hardcore music, and represented its break with punk". The band's most controversial album, Frankenchrist, brought with it the song "MTV Get Off the Air," which accused MTV of promoting poor quality music and sedating the public. The album also contained a controversial poster by Swiss surrealist artist H. R. Giger titled Penis Landscape.

Dead Kennedys toured widely during their career, starting in the late 1970s. They began playing at San Francisco's Mabuhay Gardens (their home base) and other Bay Area venues, later branching out to shows in southern Californian clubs (most notably the Whisky a Go Go), but eventually they moved to major clubs across the country, including CBGB in New York. Later, they played to larger audiences such as at the 1980 Bay Area Music Awards (where they played the notorious "Pull My Strings" for the only time), and headlined the 1983 Rock Against Reagan festival.

On May 7, 1994, punk rock fans who believed Biafra was a "sell out" attacked him at the 924 Gilman Street club in Berkeley, California. Biafra claims that he was attacked by a man nicknamed Cretin, who crashed into him while moshing. The crash injured Biafra's leg, causing an argument between the two men. During the argument, Cretin pushed Biafra to the floor and five or six friends of Cretin assaulted Biafra while he was down, yelling "Sellout rock star, kick him", and attempting to pull out his hair. Biafra was later hospitalized with serious injuries. (Note: Allmusic, having had both his legs broken. However, a July 1994 issue of Rolling Stone claims that his injuries included "extensive damage to the ligaments of one knee as well as a superficial head wound.") The attack derailed Biafra's plans for both a Canadian spoken-word tour and an accompanying album, and the production of Pure Chewing Satisfaction was halted. However, Biafra returned to the Gilman club a few months after the incident to perform a spoken-word performance as an act of reconciliation with the club.

Biafra has been a prominent figure in the Californian punk scene and was one of the third-generation members of the San Francisco punk community. Many later hardcore bands have cited Dead Kennedys as a major influence. (Note: Biafra's spoken word work has been less influential to other artists than his music. However, Biafra's spoken word work is often mentioned by Sean Kennedy as being a major influence on his work: "Episode 2". SKTFMTV. By Sean Kennedy. Perf. Sean Kennedy, Jello Biafra. Rantmedia.) Hardcore punk author Steven Blush describes Biafra as hardcore's "biggest star" who was a "powerful presence whose political insurgence and rabid fandom made him the father figure of a burgeoning subculture [and an] inspirational force [who] could also be a real prick ... Biafra was a visionary, incendiary [performer]."

After Dead Kennedys disbanded, Biafra's new songs were recorded with other bands, and he released only spoken word albums as solo projects. These collaborations had less popularity than Biafra's earlier work. However, his song "That's Progress", originally recorded with D.O.A. for the album Last Scream of the Missing Neighbors, received considerable exposure when it appeared on the album Rock Against Bush, Vol. 1.

==== Obscenity prosecution ====
In April 1986, police officers raided Biafra's house in response to complaints by the Parents Music Resource Center (PMRC). In June 1986, Los Angeles deputy city attorney Michael Guarino, working under City Attorney James Hahn, brought Biafra to trial in Los Angeles for distributing "harmful material to minors" in the Dead Kennedys album Frankenchrist. (Note: Guarino alleged that a family claimed that the poster had harmed their children. This was the first instance of a musician on trial for obscenity. Many sources cite the trial of 2 Live Crew as the first, but that trial was three years after Biafra's.) However, the dispute was about neither the music nor the lyrics from the album, but rather the print of the H. R. Giger poster Landscape XX (Penis Landscape) included with the album.

Music author Reebee Garofalo argued that Biafra and Alternative Tentacles may have been targeted because the label was a "small, self-managed and self-supported company that could ill afford a protracted legal battle." Facing the possible sentence of a year in jail and a $2,000 fine, Biafra, Dirk Dirksen, and Suzanne Stefanac founded the No More Censorship Defense Fund, a benefit featuring several punk rock bands, to help pay for his legal fees, which neither he nor his record label could afford. The jury deadlocked 7–5 in favor of acquittal, prompting a mistrial; the judge denied a prosecution request for a retrial and dismissed the charges. Dead Kennedys disbanded during the trial, in December 1986, due to the mounting legal costs; in the wake of their disbandment, Biafra made a career of his spoken word performances.

Biafra has a cameo role in the 1988 film Tapeheads. He plays an FBI agent who arrests the two protagonists (played by Tim Robbins and John Cusack). While arresting them, his character asks, "Remember what we did to Jello Biafra?", lampooning the obscenity prosecution.

On March 25, 2005, Biafra appeared on the U.S. radio program This American Life, "Episode 285: Know Your Enemy", which featured a phone call between Jello Biafra and Michael Guarino, the prosecutor in the Frankenchrist trial.

Porn Rock: The Obscenity Trial of Jello Biafra, a play written by Lawrence Meyers, was staged in Los Angeles in February 2025, depicting the obscenity prosecution and its implications.

==== Lawsuit and reunion activities ====
In October 1998, three former members of Dead Kennedys sued Biafra for nonpayment of royalties. The other members of Dead Kennedys alleged that Biafra, in his capacity as the head of Alternative Tentacles records, discovered an accounting error amounting to some $75,000 in unpaid royalties over almost a decade. Rather than informing his bandmates of this mistake, the suit alleged, Biafra knowingly concealed the information until a whistleblower employee at the record label notified the band.

According to Biafra, the suit resulted from his refusal to allow one of the band's most well-known singles, "Holiday in Cambodia", to be used in a commercial for Levi's Dockers; Biafra opposes Levi's out of his belief that they use unfair business practices and sweatshop labor. Biafra maintained that he had never denied them royalties and that he as well had not received royalties for re-releases of their albums or "posthumous" live albums that had been licensed to other labels by the Decay Music partnership. Decay Music denied this charge and have posted what they say are his cashed royalty checks, written to his legal name of Eric Boucher. Biafra also complained about the songwriting credits in new reissues and archival live albums of songs, alleging that he was the sole composer of songs that were wrongly credited to the entire band.

In May 2000, a San Francisco jury found in favor of Biafra's former bandmates, concluding that Biafra and Alternative Tentacles had underpaid royalties and failed to promote the band's back catalog adequately. The plaintiffs were awarded about $220,000 in damages, including $20,000 in punitive damages. In June 2003, a three-judge panel of the California Court of Appeal upheld the damages award but set aside an order dissolving the band's Decay Music partnership, returning that issue to the trial court for further consideration. The jury also found that the band's work was owned by the four-member partnership Decay Music and that partnership decisions could be made by majority vote rather than requiring unanimity. Biafra's former bandmates re-formed Dead Kennedys without him in 2001, using a succession of replacement vocalists.

In a May 2025 interview with Guitar World, East Bay Ray discussed a potential reunion with Jello Biafra saying that he and Klaus Flouride were open to a reunion however it would never happen and that Biafra was to blame. He said that over the years lucrative offers such as one in 2017 from Riot Fest were proposed to the band but Biafra was against it. “It’s not an issue for me or Klaus. It’s Biafra that turns down any offers for us to do something; we don’t have any problem.” East Bay Ray went on to criticize Biafra's post Dead Kennedys career and how Biafra took credit for writing most of the band's songs in which he took exception to Biafra's claims by saying “We actually wrote as a band, where in effect, due to the chemistry between us, it was a case of two and two equaling five. None of us has had a solo career that was bigger than Dead Kennedys, which, to me, shows the power of a bunch of talented people getting together and creating something that was far greater than the sum of its parts. Jello didn’t bring in the songs. I know he’s created the myth that he wrote them all, but the question here is that if he did, why didn’t he ever do anything significant after leaving the band?,” adding, “Iggy left The Stooges and had a career; ditto Lou Reed with the Velvet Underground or Morrissey with the Smiths. Where’s Biafra’s solo career with a bunch of great songs? The songs were written in numerous different ways. “Holiday in Cambodia” started as a jam in the rehearsal studio” he said.

Biafra, in a 2012 interview with the Tampa Bay Times, stated he was not happy with the current direction of his former bandmates, nor did he want to restart Dead Kennedys for nostalgia purposes:

We haven't talked in a dozen years. In their hearts they've become Republicans and I just wouldn't do something like that unless we can bring back the real thing. In a way getting me back into the band would be their worst nightmare, like make them rehearse. When people tell me that I owe it to the fans to regurgitate nothing but old music with the people I used to play with, that's totally the opposite of what punk and Dead Kennedys means to me. The true spirit of the whole thing is to keep going, keep moving and make more new stuff. Nobody was more cynical than the original punks about nostalgia and retro because of all the rage on TV and people started to get nostalgic in goofy ass ways for the sixties and they were thinking, "Yeah, that will never happen to us." That's not what I'm here for, sorry. It's not as if the people who come to the Guantanamo School of Medicine shows wanting nothing but old Dead Kennedys songs don't leave with a smile on their face once they've heard the new songs. It's not like I've forgot how to write this shit.

=== Other bands ===
In the early 1980s, Biafra collaborated with musicians Christian Lunch and Adrian Borland (of the Sound) and Morgan Fisher (of Mott the Hoople) for the electropunk musical project the Witch Trials, releasing one self-titled EP in its lifetime.

In 1988, Biafra, with Al Jourgensen and Paul Barker of the band Ministry, and Jeff Ward, formed Lard. The band became yet another side project for Ministry, with Biafra providing vocals and lyrics. In a March 2009 interview, Jourgensen said that he and Biafra were working on a new Lard album in Jourgensen's El Paso studio. Jourgensen also claimed in 2021 that Biafra was in the works on a new Lard album. While working on the film Terminal City Ricochet in 1989, Biafra performed a song for the film's soundtrack with D.O.A.. As a result, Biafra worked with D.O.A. on the album Last Scream of the Missing Neighbors. Biafra also worked with Nomeansno on the soundtrack, which led to their collaboration on the album The Sky Is Falling and I Want My Mommy the following year. Biafra also provided lyrics for the song "Biotech is Godzilla" for Sepultura's 1993 album Chaos A.D..

In 1999, Biafra and other members of the anti-globalization movement protested the WTO Meeting of 1999 in Seattle. Along with other prominent West Coast musicians, he formed a short-lived band, The No WTO Combo, to help promote the movement's cause. The band was originally scheduled to play during the protest, but the performance was canceled due to riots. The band performed a short set the following night at the Showbox in downtown Seattle, outside the designated area, along with the hip-hop group Spearhead. The No WTO Combo later released a CD of recordings from the concert, titled Live from the Battle in Seattle.

In the mid-2000s, Biafra collaborated with the Melvins under the name Jello Biafra and the Melvins. The collaboration produced Never Breathe What You Can't See (2004) and Sieg Howdy! (2005), and Biafra performed with the Melvins again at his Biafra Five-O concerts at the Great American Music Hall in June 2008. In 2008, Biafra formed a new band with guitarist Ralph Spight, bassist Billy Gould and drummer Jon Weiss, which debuted at Biafra Five-O in June as Jello Biafra and the Axis of Merry Evildoers and adopted the name Jello Biafra and the Guantanamo School of Medicine the following year.

In 2011, Biafra appeared in a singular concert event with an all-star cast of Southern musicians including members from Cowboy Mouth, Dash Rip Rock, Mojo Nixon, and Down titled, "Jello Biafra and the New Orleans Raunch & Soul All Stars" who performed an array of classic Soul covers to a packed house at the 12-Bar in New Orleans, Louisiana. He would later reunite with many of the same musicians during the Carnival season 2014 to revisit many of these classics in Siberia, New Orleans. A live album from the 2011 performance, Walk on Jindal's Splinters, and a companion single, Fannie May/Just a Little Bit, were released in 2015.

In September 2019 Biafra travelled to Sydney, Australia to deliver a eulogy on stage for his late friend Damien Lovelock at the tribute Damo the Musical. He performed on stage with surviving members of Lovelock's band the Celibate Rifles. In 2025, as part of their Field of Vision Jello Biafra performed a rendition of "Police Truck" with King Gizzard & the Lizard Wizard.

=== Alternative Tentacles ===
In June 1979, Biafra co-founded the record label Alternative Tentacles, with which Dead Kennedys released their first single, "California über alles". (Note: In Dead Kennedys v. Jello Biafra, Cal. App. 1 Dist., 2003 A094272, the label was legally formalized in 1981 but it existed informally since 1979. Biafra became the sole owner of the label in 1986.) The label was created to allow the band to release albums without having to deal with pressure from major labels to change their music, although the major labels were not willing to sign the band due to their songs being deemed too controversial. After dealing with Cherry Red Records in the UK and I.R.S. Records in the United States for their first album Fresh Fruit for Rotting Vegetables, the band released all later albums, and later pressings of Fresh Fruit on Alternative Tentacles. Biafra became the sole owner of Alternative Tentacles in 1986, when the band's ownership interest in the label was transferred to him; he has said that he does not draw a salary from the label and has described his role as "absentee thoughtlord".

Biafra is a collector of unusual vinyl records of all kinds, from 1950s and 1960s ethno-pop recordings by the likes of Les Baxter and Esquivel to vanity pressings that have circulated regionally, to German crooner Heino, for whom he would later participate in the documentary Heino: Made In Germany; he cites his always growing collection as one of his biggest musical influences. In 1993 he gave an interview to RE/Search Publications for their second Incredibly Strange Music book focusing primarily on these records, and later participated in a two-part episode of Fuse TV's program Crate Diggers on the same subject. Biafra later worked with musician and visual artist Wesley Willis, compiling Willis's Greatest Hits for Alternative Tentacles in 1995; the label subsequently released further recordings by Willis. Biafra also endorsed and recorded with outsider musician Ralph Gean in the late 1990s, but did not sign Gean to Alternative Tentacles. Biafra's collection grew so large that on October 1, 2005, Biafra donated a portion of his collection to an annual yard sale co-promoted by Alternative Tentacles and held at their warehouse in Emeryville, California.

In 2006, along with Alternative Tentacles employee and The Frisk lead singer Jesse Luscious, Biafra began co-hosting The Alternative Tentacles Batcast, a downloadable podcast hosted by alternativetentacles.com. The show primarily focuses on interviews with artists and bands signed to Alternative Tentacles, with occasional episodes devoted to fan questions; in October 2022, Biafra launched a separate interview podcast, Jello Biafra's Renegade Roundtable.

== Spoken word ==
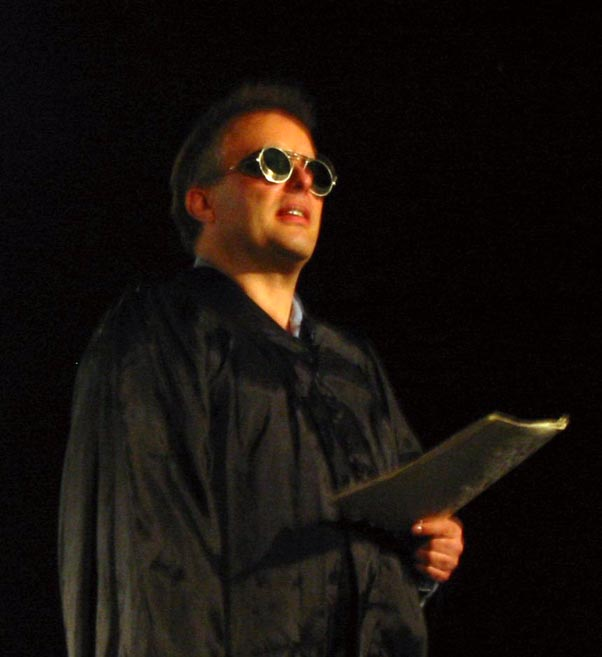
Biafra in an appearance in Aarau, Switzerland

Biafra became a spoken word artist in January 1986 with a performance at University of California, Los Angeles. In his performance, he combined humor with his political beliefs, much in the same way that he did with the lyrics to his songs. Despite his continued spoken word performances, he did not begin recording spoken word albums until after the disbanding of Dead Kennedys. His spoken word album In the Grip of Official Treason was released on October 24, 2006.

Biafra was also featured in the British band Pitchshifter's song As Seen on TV reciting the words of dystopian futuristic radio advertisements.

== Politics ==
Biafra has resisted identifying with any particular ideology, saying, "I don't label myself strictly an anarchist or a socialist or let alone a libertarian or something like that," In a 2012 interview, Biafra said "I'm very pro-tax as long as it goes for the right things. I don't mind paying more money as long as it's going to provide shelter for people sleeping in the street or getting the schools fixed back up, getting the infrastructure up to the standards of other countries, including a high-speed rail system. I'm totally down with that."

=== Mayoral campaign ===
For those of them who have seen my candidacy as a publicity stunt or a joke, they should keep in mind that it is no more of a joke, and no less of a joke, than anyone else they care to name.

— Jello Biafra, Dead Kennedys: The Early Years

In the autumn of 1979, Biafra ran for mayor of San Francisco, using the Jell-O ad campaign catchphrase, "There's always room for Jello", as his campaign slogan. Having entered the race before creating a campaign platform, Biafra later wrote his platform on a napkin while attending a Pere Ubu concert where Dead Kennedys drummer Ted told Biafra, "Biafra, you have such a big mouth that you should run for Mayor." As he campaigned, Biafra wore campaign T-shirts from his opponent Quentin Kopp's previous campaign and at one point vacuumed leaves off the front lawn of another opponent, Dianne Feinstein, to mock her publicity stunt of sweeping streets in downtown San Francisco for a few hours. He also made a whistlestop campaign tour along the BART line. Supporters committed equally odd actions; two well-known signs held by supporters said "If he doesn't win I'll kill myself" and "What if he wins?"

At the time, in San Francisco, any individual could legally run for mayor if a petition was signed by 1500 people or if $1500 was paid. Biafra paid $900 and got signatures over time and eventually became a legal candidate, meaning he received statements put in voters' pamphlets and equal news coverage.

His platform included unconventional points such as forcing businessmen to wear clown suits within city limits, erecting statues of Dan White, who assassinated Mayor George Moscone and City Supervisor Harvey Milk in 1978, around the city and allowing the parks department to sell eggs and tomatoes with which people could pelt the statues, hiring workers who had lost their jobs due to a tax initiative to panhandle in wealthy neighborhoods (including Feinstein's), and a citywide ban on cars. Biafra has expressed irritation that these parts of his platform attained such notoriety, preferring instead to be remembered for serious proposals such as legalizing squatting in vacant, tax-delinquent buildings and requiring police officers to run for election by the people of the neighborhoods they patrol.

Biafra finished fourth out of a field of ten in the first round of voting, receiving 3.79 percent of the vote (6,591 votes); he failed to advance to the runoff and Dianne Feinstein won the second round of the voting.

=== Presidential campaign ===
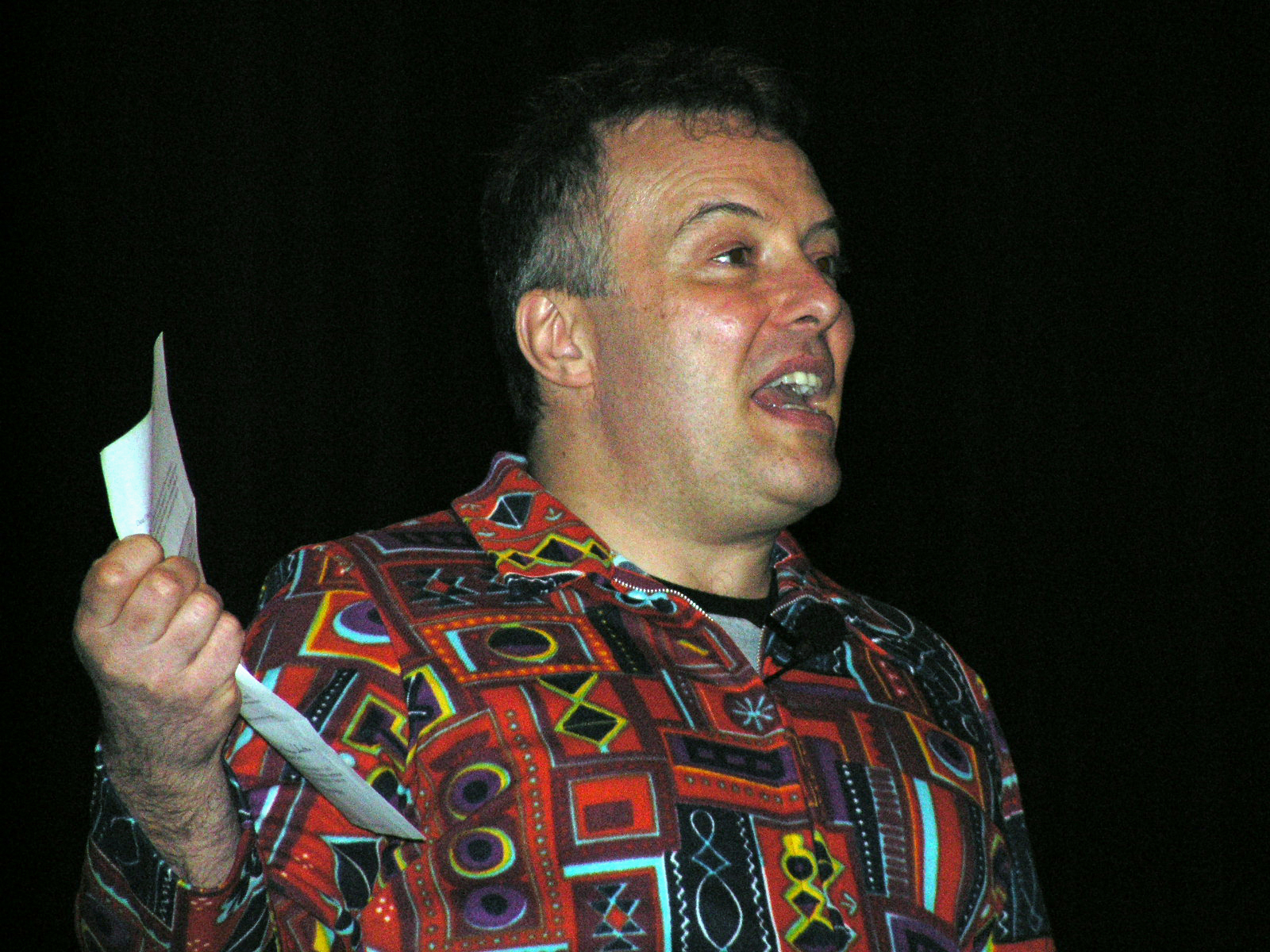
Biafra discussing politics in 2006

In 2000, the New York State Green Party drafted Biafra as a candidate for the Green Party presidential nomination, and a few supporters were elected to the party's nominating convention in Denver, Colorado. Biafra chose death row inmate Mumia Abu-Jamal as his running mate. The party overwhelmingly chose Ralph Nader as the presidential candidate with 295 of the 319 delegate votes. Biafra received 10 votes.

Biafra, along with a camera crew (dubbed by Biafra as "The Camcorder Truth Jihad"), later reported for the Independent Media Center at the Republican and Democratic conventions.

=== Post-2000 ===
After losing the 2000 nomination, Biafra became highly active in Nader's presidential campaign, as well as in 2004 and 2008. During the 2008 campaign Jello played at rallies and answered questions for journalists in support of Nader. When gay rights activists accused Nader of costing Al Gore the 2000 election, Biafra reminded them that Tipper Gore's Parents Music Resource Center wanted warning stickers on albums with content referencing homosexuality.

After Barack Obama won the general election, Biafra wrote an open letter making suggestions on how to run his term as president. Biafra criticized Obama during his term, stating that "Obama even won the award for best advertising campaign of 2008." Biafra dubbed Obama "Barackstar O'Bummer". Biafra refused to support Obama in 2012. Biafra has stated that he feels that Obama continued many of George W. Bush's policies, summarizing Obama's policies as containing "worse and worse laws against human rights and more and more illegal unconstitutional spying."

On September 18, 2015, it was announced that Biafra would be supporting Bernie Sanders in his campaign for the 2016 presidential election. He has strongly criticized the political position of Donald Trump, saying "how can people be so fucking stupid" on hearing the election result. He also criticized Trump's cabinet picks, saying of then-Secretary of Energy Rick Perry, "The last person we want with their finger on the nuclear button is somebody connected to this extreme Christianist doomsday cult."

On February 28, 2020, Jello announced that he would be supporting both Elizabeth Warren and Bernie Sanders in the 2020 presidential election. "I personally like Warren slightly better than Bernie because: 1) She’s done her homework. Bernie too, but not to quite the same depth or degree. 2) Think about it—who really has a better chance of actually beating Trump, and helping flip Congress and state legislatures? It’s Elizabeth Warren, hands down." He went on to say that he considered Joe Biden and Mike Bloomberg "almost as bad as Trump".

On April 12, 2020, Biafra expressed disappointment that Sanders had suspended his campaign for the 2020 Democratic nomination.

=== Boycott of Israel ===
In mid-2011 Jello Biafra and his band were scheduled to play at the Barby Club in Tel Aviv. They came under pressure by the pro-Palestinian Boycott, Divestment and Sanctions (BDS) campaign, and finally decided to cancel the concert – after a debate which according to Biafra "deeply tore at the fabric of our band ... This whole controversy has been one of the most intense situations of my life – and I thrive on intense situations".

Biafra then decided to travel to Israel and Palestine, at his own expense, and talk with Israeli and Palestinian activists as well as with fans disappointed at his cancellation. In the article stating his conclusions he wrote: "I will not perform in Israel unless it is a pro-human rights, anti-occupation event, that does not violate the spirit of the boycott. Each musician, artist, etc. must decide this for themselves. I am staying away for now, but am also really creeped out by the attitudes of some of the hardliners and hope someday to find a way to contribute something positive here. I will not march or sign on with anyone who runs around calling people Zionazis and is more interested in making threats than making friends."

=== Electoral history ===
San Francisco mayoral election, 1979 (first round) November 6, 1979
Party	Candidate	Votes	%
Democratic	Dianne Feinstein (incumbent)	81,115	42.15
Independent	Quentin L. Kopp	77,784	40.42
Nonpartisan	David Scott	18,506	9.60
Nonpartisan	Jello Biafra	6,591	3.79
Nonpartisan	Sylvia Weinstein	3,529	2.03
Nonpartisan	Cesar Ascarrunz	1,739	1.00
Nonpartisan	Scattering	3,198	1.66

Green Party Primary, 2000 United States presidential election
Party	Candidate	Votes	%
Green	Ralph Nader	49,276	91.08
Green	Joel Kovel	4,294	7.94
Green	Jello Biafra	356	0.66
Green	Stephen Gaskin	134	0.25
Green	Scattering	44	0.08

== Personal life ==
Biafra married Theresa Soder, a.k.a. Ninotchka, lead singer of San Francisco-area punk band the Situations on October 31, 1981. (Note: Soder can be heard singing background vocals on "Forest Fire" and "Winnebago Warrior" from the Dead Kennedys' album Plastic Surgery Disasters and playing synthesizer on "Drug Me" from Dead Kennedys' Fresh Fruit for Rotting Vegetables.) The wedding was conducted by Flipper vocalist/bassist Bruce Loose, who became a Universal Life Church minister specifically to conduct the ceremony, which took place in a graveyard. The wedding reception, which members of Flipper, Black Flag, and D.O.A. attended, was held at director Joe Rees' Target Video studios. The marriage ended in divorce.

Biafra identifies as agnostic. He has a Jewish great-grandparent but was unaware of this until he was in his mid-40s. Due to his secular upbringing and lack of knowledge of his distant Jewish ancestry until adulthood, he does not consider himself Jewish.

On March 7, 2026, Biafra suffered a hemorrhagic stroke caused by hypertension and was hospitalized; while continuing rehabilitation for weakness on his left side, he returned to the stage on June 27 at TentacleFest at San Francisco's Great American Music Hall, where he performed with Wheelchair Sports Camp and served as master of ceremonies.

He lives in San Francisco, California.

== Selected discography ==
For a more complete list, see the Jello Biafra discography.

=== Dead Kennedys ===
- 1980 – Fresh Fruit for Rotting Vegetables
- 1981 – In God We Trust, Inc.
- 1982 – Plastic Surgery Disasters
- 1985 – Frankenchrist
- 1986 – Bedtime for Democracy
- 1987 – Give Me Convenience or Give Me Death

=== Spoken word ===
- 1987 – No More Cocoons
- 1989 – High Priest of Harmful Matter: Tales From the Trial
- 1991 – I Blow Minds for a Living
- 1994 – Beyond the Valley of the Gift Police
- 1998 – If Evolution Is Outlawed, Only Outlaws Will Evolve
- 2000 – Become the Media
- 2002 – The Big Ka-Boom, Pt. 1
- 2002 – Machine Gun in the Clown's Hand
- 2006 – In the Grip of Official Treason

=== Lard ===
- 1989 – The Power of Lard
- 1990 – The Last Temptation of Reid
- 1997 – Pure Chewing Satisfaction
- 2000 – 70's Rock Must Die

=== Jello Biafra and the Guantanamo School of Medicine ===
- 2009 – The Audacity of Hype
- 2011 – Enhanced Methods of Questioning
- 2012 – SHOCK-U-PY
- 2013 – White People and the Damage Done
- 2020 – Tea Party Revenge Porn

=== Collaborations ===
Jello Biafra musical collaborations
Year	Album	Artist
1980	The Witch Trials	Jello Biafra with East Bay Ray, Adrian Borland, Morgan Fisher, Christian Lunch
1989	Last Scream of the Missing Neighbors	Jello Biafra with D.O.A.
1989	The Iceberg/Freedom of Speech... Just Watch What You Say!	Ice-T (Several samples from Biafra's No More Coccons album, appear on "Shut Up, Be Happy" and "Freedom of Speech".)
1991	The Sky is Falling and I Want My Mommy	Jello Biafra with Nomeansno
1991	Tumor Circus	Tumor Circus was a collaboration between Jello Biafra and members of Steel Pole Bath Tub and Grong Grong. Dave Brockie and Michael Bishop of Gwar also provide backing vocals on one track.
1993	Chaos A.D.	Sepultura (Biafra appears on the track "Biotech Is Godzilla")
1994	Prairie Home Invasion	Jello Biafra & Mojo Nixon
1995	Notes from Thee Underground	Pigface (Biafra appears on the track "Hag-Seed")
1995	Raza Odiada	Brujería (Biafra provides spoken-word vocals on the track "Raza Odiada (Pito Wilson)")
1997	Ixnay on the Hombre	The Offspring (Biafra speaks on the opening track "Disclaimer")
1997	Let Us Play!	Coldcut (Biafra is featured on "Every Home a Prison")
2000	Live from the Battle in Seattle	The No WTO Combo
2000	Deviant	Pitchshifter (Biafra is featured on "As Seen On TV")
2004	Never Breathe What You Can't See	Jello Biafra with the Melvins
2005	Sieg Howdy!	Jello Biafra with the Melvins
2008	Jezebel/Speed Demon 7"	Jello Biafra with members of Zen Guerillas
2012	We Occupy	Jello Biafra with D.O.A.
2015	Walk on Jindal's Splinters	Jello Biafra and the New Orleans Raunch & Soul Allstars
2016	In the Age of Corporate Personhood	Disaster Strikes (Biafra is featured on Age of Corporate Personhood)
2019	bi/MENTAL	Le Butcherettes (Biafra is featured on spider/WAVES)
2020	Carnivore	Body Count (Biafra is featured on "The Hate is Real")
2022	Who Are We?	Al-Qasar (Biafra is featured on "Ya Malak")

== Filmography ==
- 1977 – This Is America, Pt. 2
- 1981 – Urgh! A Music War
- 1983 – Anarchism in America
- 1986 – Lovedolls Superstar, directed by Dave Markey
- 1987 – Household Affairs, directed & filmed by Allen Ginsberg
- 1988 – Tapeheads, directed by Bill Fishman
- 1990 – Terminal City Ricochet
- 1991 – Highway 61, directed by Bruce McDonald
- 1994 – Skulhedface, directed by Melanie Mandl
- 1997 – Mary Jane's Not a Virgin Anymore, directed by Sarah Jacobson
- 1999 – The Widower
- 1999 – Virtue
- 2001 – Plaster Caster
- 2002 – Bikini Bandits, directed by Steve and Peter Grasse
- 2004 – Death and Texas
- 2004 – Punk: Attitude
- 2005 – We Jam Econo: The Story of the Minutemen
- 2006 – Punk's Not Dead, directed by Susan Dynner
- 2006 – Whose War?, directed by Donald Farmer
- 2007 – American Drug War: The Last White Hope, directed by Kevin Booth
- 2008 – Nerdcore Rising, directed by Negin Farsad
- 2009 – Open Your Mouth and Say Mr. Chi Pig, directed by Sean Patrick Shaul
- 2010 – A Man Within, directed by Yony Leyser
- 2011 – I Love You ... I Am the Porn Queen, short film directed by Ani Kyd
- 2014 – Heino: Made in Germany, directed by Oliver Schwabe
- 2014 – Portlandia, season 4, episode 4 – "Pull-Out King"
- 2018 – Bathtubs Over Broadway, directed by Dava Whisenant (as himself)
- 2018 – Boiled Angels: The Trial of Mike Diana, directed by Frank Henenlotter (narrator)
- 2019 – The Last Black Man in San Francisco, directed by Joe Talbot
