= East Bay Ray =

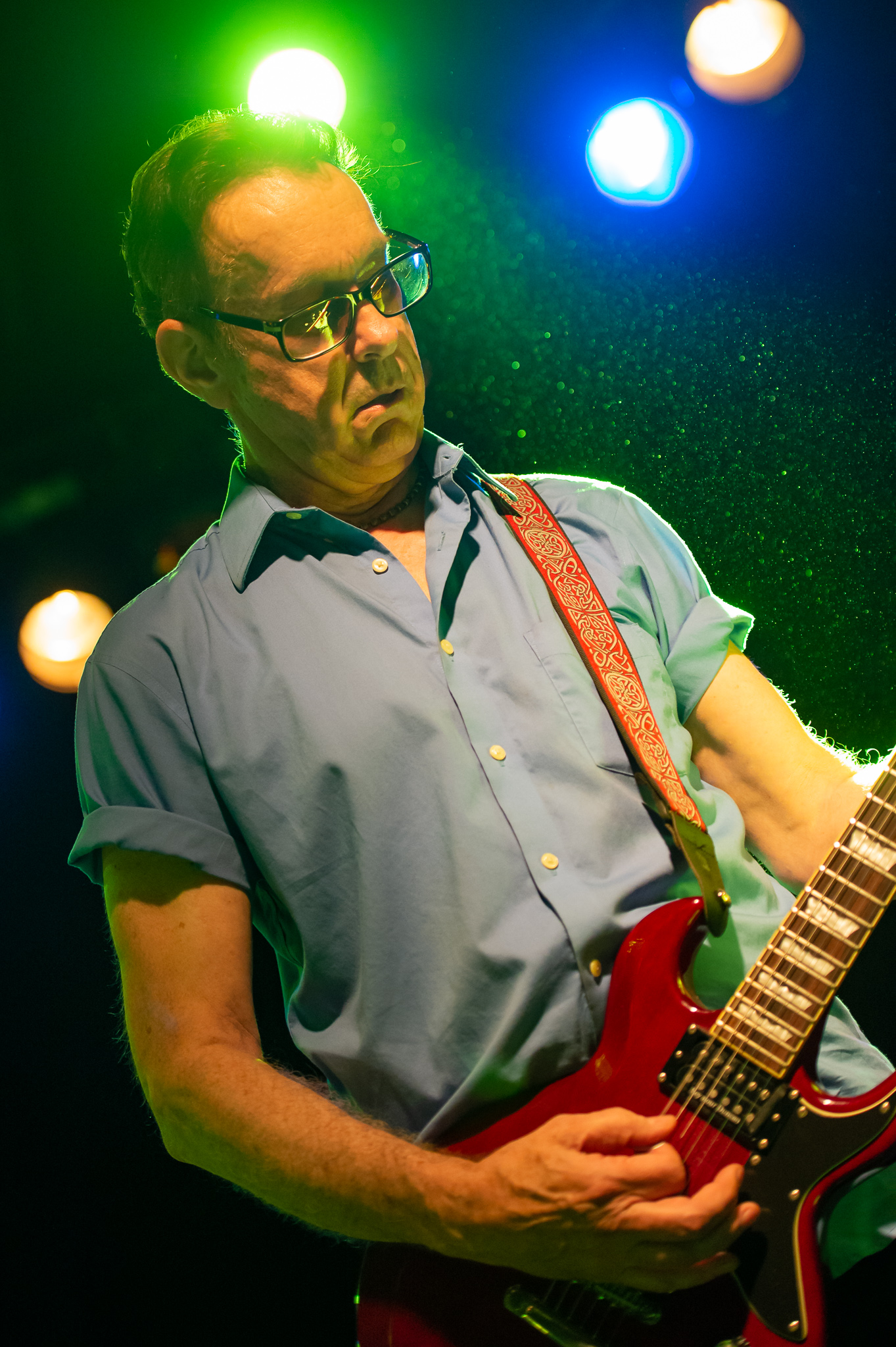
- East Bay Ray performing with the Dead Kennedys in 2019

Background information
- Also known as: Ray Pepperell, Ray Valium
- Born: Raymond John Pepperell; November 17, 1958 (age 67); Oakland, California, U.S.
- Genres: Punk rock; speed metal
- Instrument: Guitar
- Label: Manifesto Records

Raymond John Pepperell, more commonly known by the stage name "East Bay Ray", is an American musician who plays guitar for the San Francisco Bay area-based punk band Dead Kennedys. His guitar work was influenced by jazz and rockabilly. Alongside Jello Biafra's astute lyrics and unique vibrato-based vocal style, East Bay Ray's playing was one of the defining factors of the music of the Dead Kennedys, and by extension, of the "second wave" of American punk. He is also the only Dead Kennedy to remain a constant member of the band since its formation.

== Early life and education ==
Raymond John Pepperell was born on November 17th, 1958. He was raised in the San Francisco Bay area and was musically influenced by both his parents, who organized local art and music festivals in their suburban neighborhood. His father had a collection of 1930s and 1940s jazz and blues records, and would take him and his brother to performances by Muddy Waters, the Count Basie Orchestra and Lightnin' Hopkins. His mother was a fan of the Weavers and Pete Seeger. His parents, who were also active in the Civil Rights Movement of the 1960s, also influenced him politically. Ray graduated from the University of California, Berkeley and planned to become an architect, but found architecture too artistically limiting. By this time, he had already began writing and playing music as he realized that he could not live without it.

== Career ==
Before the Dead Kennedys, East Bay Ray played guitar with a San Francisco Bay Area based rockabilly/doo-wop bar band Cruis'n, releasing one single, "Vicky's Hickey", sold primarily at their shows.

The Dead Kennedys were an American punk rock band. Although they kept their music mostly loud, fast, and aggressive, they occasionally played eclectic flourishes. These experiments included the guitar playing of East Bay Ray, who took cues from sources such as film music (spy movie scores and Ennio Morricone Spaghetti Western scores), instrumental surf rock (the guitar stylings of Dick Dale and George Tomsco of The Fireballs), as well as the psychedelic music of the 60s (especially early Pink Floyd) with his trademark echo effects. With help from Jello Biafra and Klaus Flouride, East Bay Ray crafted a distinct and driving guitar style and sound.

In interviews East Bay Ray has cited the playing of Syd Barrett on Pink Floyd's first album The Piper at the Gates of Dawn, as well as the music of the Ohio Players, and the guitar playing of Elvis Presley side-man Scotty Moore (with his trademark echo), as influences. East Bay Ray's fondness for Spaghetti Western music is evidenced by a 7" single he recorded in 1984 called "Trouble in Town"/"Poison Heart."

After Dead Kennedys stopped touring in February 1986, East Bay Ray formed the band Kage with female vocalist Bana Witt. He played guitar on a range of projects including an Algerian Raï music album for Cheikha Rimitti called Sidi Mansour, which also featured Red Hot Chili Peppers bassist Flea (coincidentally, D.H. Peligro later became a drummer for RHCP for a short time) and Robert Fripp, to garage-pop with Pearl Harbor, retro-jungle-surf with Johnny Feelings, and exotica lounge music with Frenchy. He composed and recorded a sound track for an early independent film by David Siegel and Scott McGhee, who later made the film noir movie The Deep End. In the early 1990s, Ray formed the funk/rock band Skrapyard and released Sex is Sex on Alternative Tentacles featuring Ron West, Robert Ball, Andy Kaps and Jason Collins. In 2000, Ray appeared on Hed PE's second studio album, Broke, performing guitar on the song "Waiting to Die", and other nu-metal bands have cited him and the Dead Kennedys as an influence.

East Bay Ray was involved in all the Dead Kennedys' studio recordings and is credited for mixing and producing the band's first single, "California Uber Alles"/"Man with the Dogs", the band's first LP Fresh Fruit for Rotting Vegetables with Oliver Dicicco, the EP In God We Trust, Inc. and he mixed "Holiday in Cambodia"/"Police Truck". Ray was one of the founders of the original Alternative Tentacles Records, set up for other artists and Dead Kennedys, and was a partner in it until the mid-1980s. Ray mixed and produced two CDs of live Dead Kennedys recordings, Mutiny on the Bay and Live at the Deaf Club.

Starting in 2001, East Bay Ray headed the legal struggle to win ownership of Dead Kennedys' intellectual property and to secure royalties withheld from the band by Jello Biafra. Biafra was found civilly liable for fraud, malice and breach of contract. Ray authorized and had a production credit for a CD of live Dead Kennedys recordings titled Mutiny on the Bay. East Bay Ray was responsible, along with his ex-bandmates Klaus Flouride and D.H. Peligro, for licensing songs such as "Police Truck" and "Holiday in Cambodia" to major corporations for use in video games and films. Dead Kennedys, including Biafra, had previously approved the use of the band's songs in the major film corporation releases Neighbors (1981), and Class (1983). In 1999, Biafra himself approved the license to Tony Hawk's video game.

Ray was a featured artist in the April 2006 edition of Guitar Player magazine talking about recording production techniques and in the January 2006 issue of Guitar World.

Ray guests on the track "Guitar Hero" on The Dresden Dolls lead singer/pianist Amanda Palmer's solo debut, Who Killed Amanda Palmer.

Ray also released the 7" single Trouble in Town in 1984 (Alternative Tentacles Records), featuring the songs "Poisoned Heart" and "Trouble in Town", with guest vocalists Vince and Steve One.
