= List of Flotsam and Jetsam band members =

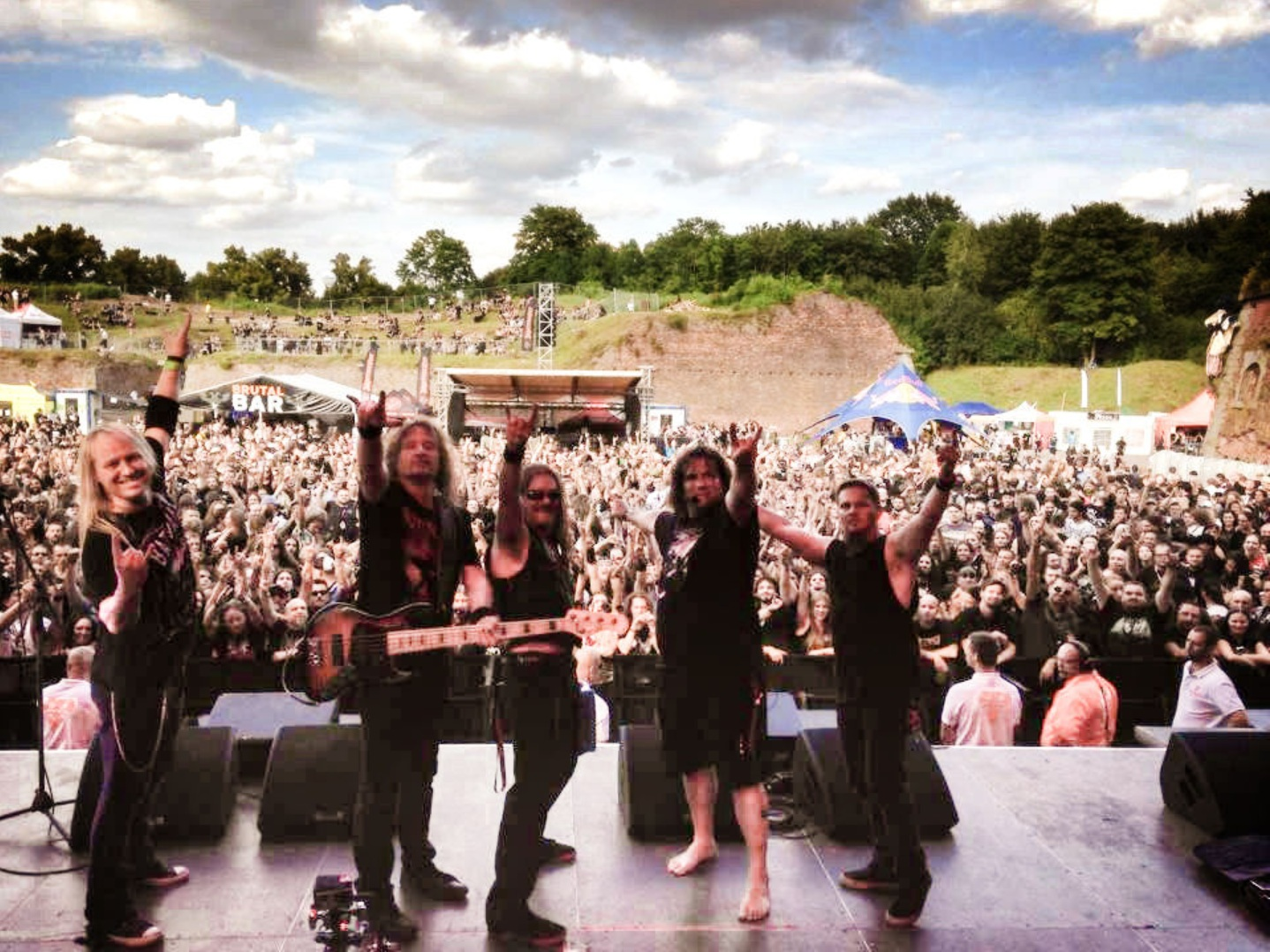
Flotsam and Jetsam onstage in 2014.

Flotsam and Jetsam is an American thrash metal band from Phoenix, Arizona. Formed in 1981, the group originally consisted of vocalist John Eurich, guitarists Pete Mello and David Goulder, bassist Jason Newsted and drummer Kelly David-Smith. The band's current lineup includes vocalist Eric "A. K." Knutson (who first joined in 1982), guitarists Michael Gilbert (1985–1997, 1999–2000, and since 2010) and Steve Conley (since 2013), drummer Ken Mary (since 2017) and bassist Bill Bodily (since 2020).

== History ==
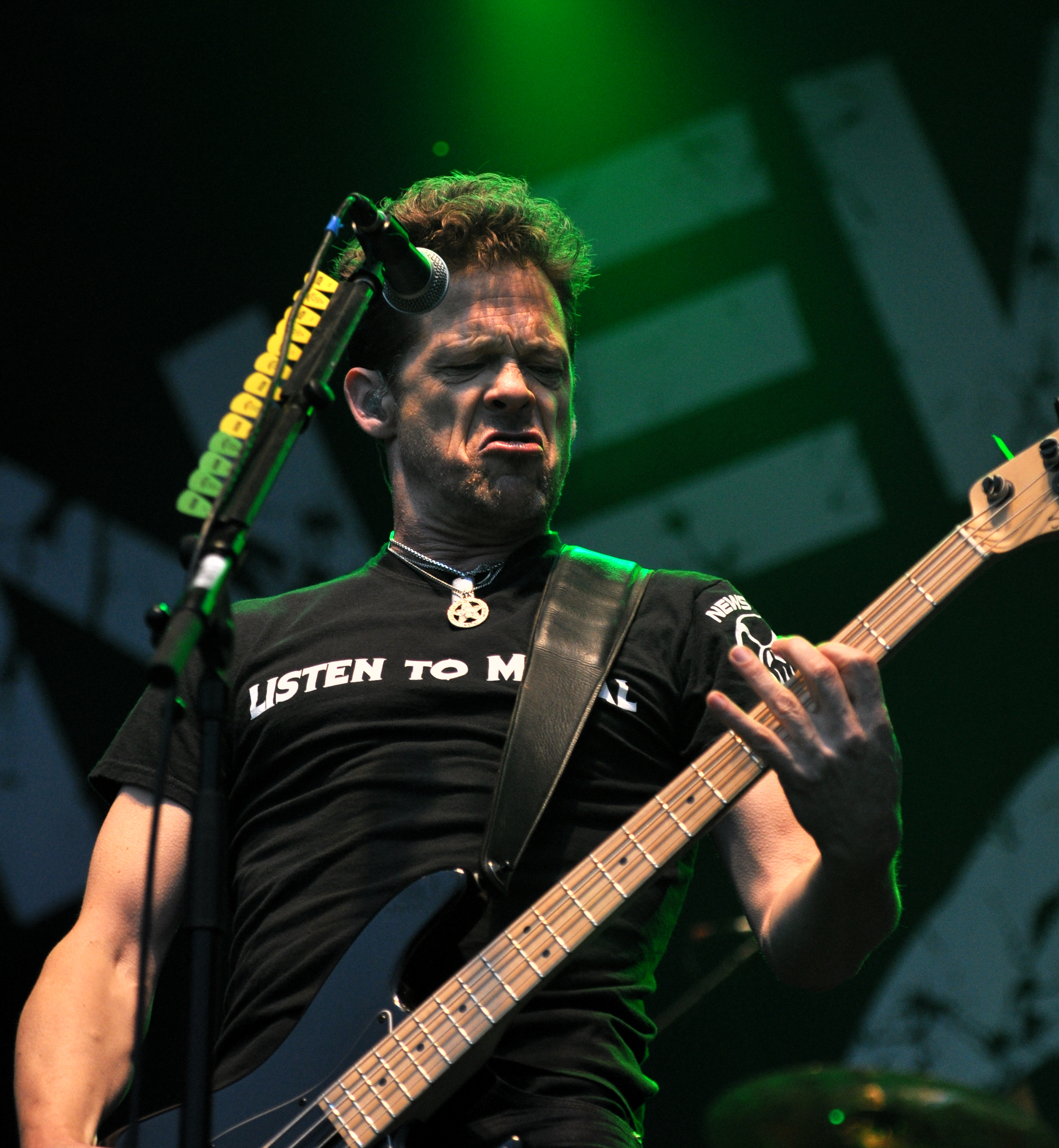
Jason Newsted was Flotsam and Jetsam's bassist from their foundation in 1981 until he joined Metallica in October 1986.

=== 1981–1991 ===
Flotsam and Jetsam evolved from a band originally known as Paradox, which was formed in the fall of 1981 by drummer Kelly David-Smith with guitarists Pete Mello and David Goulder, bassist Jason Newsted, and vocalist John Eurich. Shortly after the group's first show in February 1982, by which time they had changed their name to Dredlox, Eurich left and the band continued as a four-piece with Newsted on vocals, replacing Mello and Goulder with Mark Vasquez and Kevin Horton. By August 1982, Eric "A. K." Knutson had joined the band as its new lead vocalist, with the name changed again shortly thereafter to Dogz. In 1983, inspired by Judas Priest's dual-lead guitar setup, the band replaced Horton with Edward Carlson, changing their name to Flotsam and Jetsam (F&J) around late 1983/early 1984. Michael Gilbert replaced Vasquez in February 1985.

With the settled lineup of Knutson, Carlson, Gilbert, Newsted and David-Smith, F&J released the demos Iron Tears and Metal Shock in 1985. The band subsequently signed with Metal Blade Records and released its full-length debut album Doomsday for the Deceiver in 1986. In October that year, Newsted left the band to take over as bassist in Metallica, following the death of Cliff Burton the month before. He played his last show with F&J on October 31, 1986. For a few shows during November, Phil Rind of Sacred Reich filled in on bass, before Michael Spencer took over on a permanent basis before the end of the year. Spencer only lasted until October the next year, however, being replaced by Troy Gregory the day after a show on October 31, 1987. Gregory performed on No Place for Disgrace in 1988 and When the Storm Comes Down in 1990.

=== 1991–2001 ===
In early 1991, Troy Gregory left F&J and briefly moved back to his hometown Detroit, before joining Prong a few months later. He was replaced in the spring by Jason Ward. The new lineup remained in place for six years, releasing Cuatro in 1992, Drift in 1995 and High in 1997. Around the release of High, the band lost two members — in April, before the album was out, Kelly David-Smith became the last founding member to leave; and in June, just after its release, Michael Gilbert also departed. In a 2014 interview, Kelly-Smith credited multiple issues for his departure, including disputes with the band's management, the group's departure from MCA Records, and other members' problems with drug addictions — the latter of which he also cited as part of Gilbert's reason for leaving.

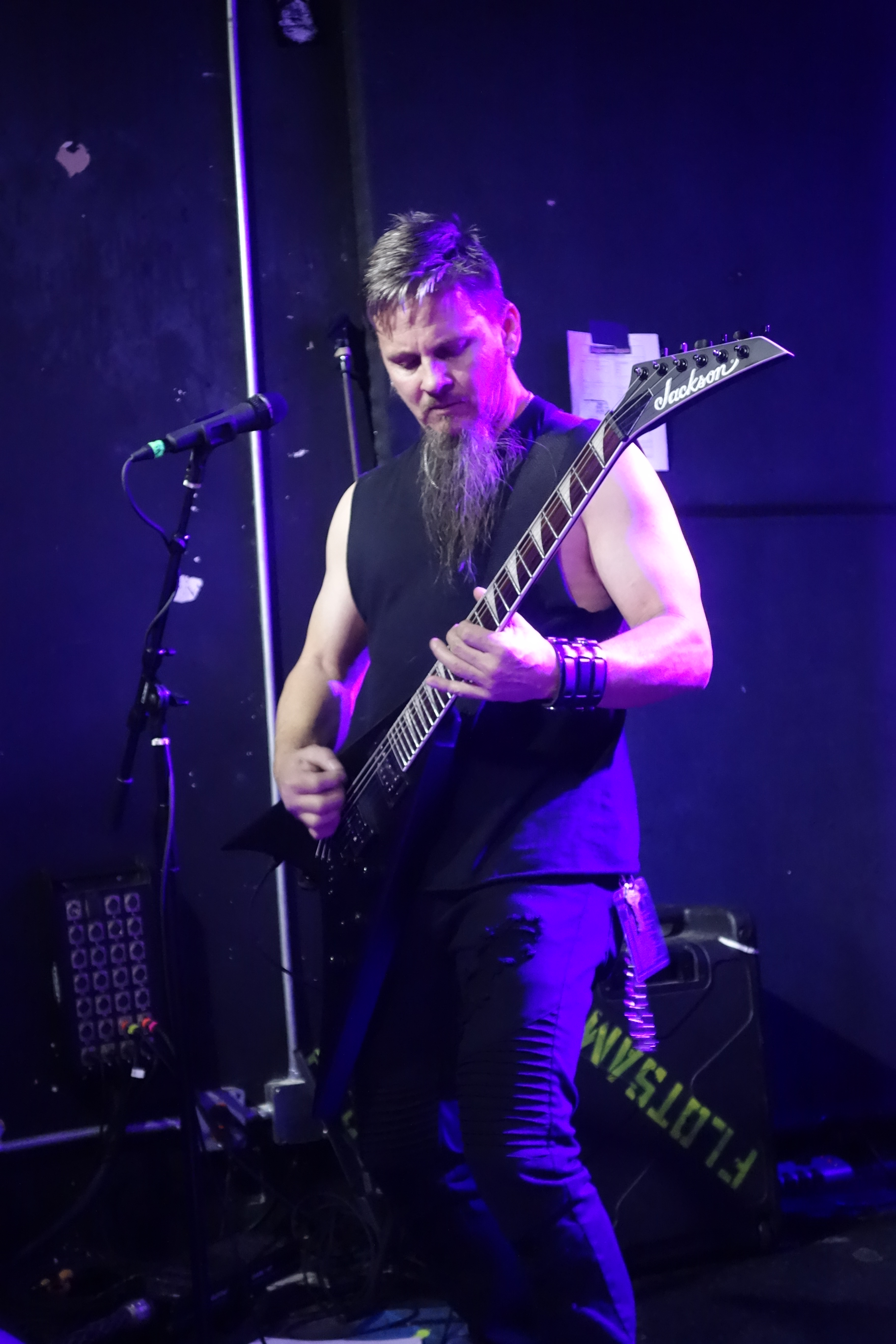
Guitarist Michael Gilbert left F&J in 1997 after 12 years, briefly returned in 1999, and has been back in the band since 2010.

Gilbert and Kelly-Smith were replaced in July 1997 by Mark Simpson and Craig Nielsen, respectively. The new lineup released Unnatural Selection in 1999, before Simpson briefly left at the end of the year to work with Lynch Mob. Gilbert stepped in for a string of live shows between October and December, and was announced as officially returning at the beginning of 2000, before Simpson returned that March. My God was released in 2001, before vocalist Eric Knutson announced his immediate departure from the band that August, blaming a lack of income for his decision to retire from the music industry. A couple of weeks later, Helstar frontman James Rivera was announced as the band's substitute vocalist for upcoming tour dates. The tour was ultimately cut short due to poor attendance, wrapping up in October with a few shows cancelled.

=== 2001–2014 ===
Following the vocalist's departure a few months earlier, it was announced in 2002 that Eric Knutson would return to F&J for a festival appearance that summer. Later that year, however, the band noted that it was in fact looking for a new vocalist. In May 2003, Knutson's return was officially announced for a planned show to be filmed for a live video release. After the release of Live in Phoenix, the band remained active for several years, issuing new studio albums Dreams of Death in 2005 and The Cold in 2010. In March 2010, Michael Gilbert returned to the band to replace Edward Carlson, who had "decided to no longer tour or record". By December, Carlson had returned to F&J, replacing the outgoing Mark Simpson. By the following September, Kelly David-Smith had returned on drums, marking a reunion of the band's 1991–1997 incarnation.

With their new lineup, F&J released Ugly Noise in 2012. Jason Ward was temporarily replaced by Jeff Barbaree for tour dates in January and February 2013, as he had to take time off to focus on "personal commitments". Shortly after the tour, Ward left the band for good, with former bassist Michael Spencer returning in his place. The band recorded No Place for Disgrace 2014 later that year, before Carlson left at the beginning of 2014 and was replaced by Steve Conley. The album was also the last to feature David-Smith, who left again in November 2014 to "focus on caring for his family". He was replaced the next month by Shadows Fall drummer Jason Bittner.

=== Since 2014 ===
F&J released their self-titled twelfth studio album in 2016, which would prove to be Jason Bittner's only contribution to the band before leaving to join Overkill in May 2017. A couple of months later, the band announced that Ken Mary (formerly of bands including Fifth Angel, TKO and Alice Cooper) had taken over from Bittner. The End of Chaos was released in 2019, after which Spencer was replaced by Bill Bodily in November 2020, following several stand-in appearances on tour. Blood in the Water and I Am the Weapon were released in 2021 and 2024, respectively.

== Members ==
=== Current ===
Image	Name	Years active	Instruments	Release contributions
	Eric "A. K." Knutson	1982–2001; 2003–present	lead vocals	all Flotsam and Jetsam (F&J) releases
	Michael Gilbert	1985–1997; 1999–2000; 2010–present	guitar; backing vocals	all F&J releases from Iron Tears (1985) to High (1997), and from Ugly Noise (2012) to present
	Steve Conley	2013–present	guitar; backing vocals	all F&J releases from No Place for Disgrace 2014 (2014) to present
	Ken Mary	2017–present	drums	The End of Chaos (2019); Blood in the Water (2021); I Am the Weapon (2024)
	Bill Bodily	2020–present (plus touring in 2016 and 2019)	bass; backing vocals	Blood in the Water (2021); I Am the Weapon (2024)

=== Former ===
Image	Name	Years active	Instruments	Release contributions
	Kelly David-Smith	1981–1997; 2011–2014	drums; backing vocals	all F&J releases from the Dogz demo (1983) to High (1997); Ugly Noise (2012); No Place for Disgrace 2014 (2014)
	Jason Newsted	1981–1986	bass; vocals (lead mid-1982, backing otherwise)	Dogz demo (1983); Iron Tears (1985); Metal Shock (1985); Doomsday for the Deceiver (1986)
	Pete Mello	1981–1982 (Note: Newsted has stated that during the early months of the band's existence, Goulder "got phased out a little bit and Kelly or I would bring in different guitar players", although it is not clear exactly when he left the band, and whether he was replaced by anyone before the arrival of Mark Vasquez and Kevin Horton later in 1982.)	guitar; backing vocals	none
	David Goulder	1981–1982	guitar; backing vocals	none
	John Eurich	1981–1982	lead vocals	none
	Mark Vasquez	1982–1985	guitar; backing vocals	Dogz demo (1983)
	Kevin Horton	1982–1983	guitar; backing vocals	Dogz demo (1983)
	Edward Carlson	1983–2010; 2010–2014	guitar; backing vocals	all F&J releases from Iron Tears (1985) to No Place for Disgrace 2014 (2014)
	Michael Spencer	1986–1987; 2013–2020	bass; backing vocals	No Place for Disgrace 2014 (2014); Flotsam and Jetsam (2016); The End of Chaos (2019)
	Troy Gregory	1987–1991	bass; backing vocals	No Place for Disgrace (1988); When the Storm Comes Down (1990)
	Jason Ward	1991–2013	bass; backing vocals	all F&J releases from Cuatro (1992) to Ugly Noise (2012)
	Craig Nielsen	1997–2011	drums	all F&J releases from Unnatural Selection (1999) to The Cold (2010)
	Mark Simpson	1997–1999; 2000–2010	guitar; backing vocals	all F&J releases from Unnatural Selection (1999) to The Cold (2010)
	Jason Bittner	2014–2017	drums	Flotsam and Jetsam (2016)

=== Touring ===
Image	Name	Years active	Instruments	Details
	Phil Rind	1986	bass; backing vocals	Rind filled in for shows during November 1986 after Jason Newsted's recent departure to join Metallica.
	James Rivera	2001	lead vocals	Rivera filled in for shows in September and October 2001 after Eric Knutson's sudden departure.
	Jeff Barbaree	2013	bass; backing vocals	Barbaree filled in for shows in January and February 2013 as Jason Ward had "personal commitments".

== Lineups ==
Period	Members	Releases
Fall 1981–early 1982 (as Paradox)	John Eurich — lead vocals; Pete Mello — guitar, backing vocals; David Goulder — guitar, backing vocals; Jason Newsted — bass, backing vocals; Kelly David-Smith — drums, backing vocals	none
Spring–summer 1982 (as Dredlox)	Jason Newsted — lead vocals, bass; Mark Vasquez — guitar, backing vocals; Kevin Horton — guitar, backing vocals; Kelly David-Smith — drums, backing vocals	none
August 1982–summer 1983 (as Dogz)	Eric "A. K." Knutson — lead vocals; Mark Vasquez — guitar, backing vocals; Kevin Horton — guitar, backing vocals; Jason Newsted — bass, backing vocals; Kelly David-Smith — drums, backing vocals	untitled Dogz demo (1983)
Summer 1983–January 1985 (as Dogz until late 1983/early 1984)	Eric "A. K." Knutson — lead vocals; Mark Vasquez — guitar, backing vocals; Edward Carlson — guitar, backing vocals; Jason Newsted — bass, backing vocals; Kelly David-Smith — drums, backing vocals	none
February 1985–October 1986	Eric "A. K." Knutson — lead vocals; Edward Carlson — guitar, backing vocals; Michael Gilbert — guitar, backing vocals; Jason Newsted — bass, backing vocals; Kelly David-Smith — drums, backing vocals	Iron Tears (1985); Metal Shock (1985); Doomsday for the Deceiver (1986)
November 1986	Eric "A. K." Knutson — lead vocals; Edward Carlson — guitar, backing vocals; Michael Gilbert — guitar, backing vocals; Phil Rind — bass, backing vocals (touring); Kelly David-Smith — drums, backing vocals	none
December 1986–October 1987	Eric "A. K." Knutson — lead vocals; Edward Carlson — guitar, backing vocals; Michael Gilbert — guitar, backing vocals; Michael Spencer — bass, backing vocals; Kelly David-Smith — drums, backing vocals	none
November 1987–early 1991	Eric "A. K." Knutson — lead vocals; Edward Carlson — guitar, backing vocals; Michael Gilbert — guitar, backing vocals; Troy Gregory — bass, backing vocals; Kelly David-Smith — drums, backing vocals	No Place for Disgrace (1988); When the Storm Comes Down (1990)
Spring 1991–April 1997	Eric "A. K." Knutson — lead vocals; Edward Carlson — guitar, backing vocals; Michael Gilbert — guitar, backing vocals; Jason Ward — bass, backing vocals; Kelly David-Smith — drums, backing vocals	Cuatro (1992); Drift (1995); High (1997)
April—June 1997	Eric "A. K." Knutson — lead vocals; Edward Carlson — guitar, backing vocals; Michael Gilbert — guitar, backing vocals; Jason Ward — bass, backing vocals	none
July 1997–fall 1999	Eric "A. K." Knutson — lead vocals; Edward Carlson — guitar, backing vocals; Mark Simpson — guitar, backing vocals; Jason Ward — bass, backing vocals; Craig Nielsen — drums	Unnatural Selection (1999)
October 1999–March 2000	Eric "A. K." Knutson — lead vocals; Edward Carlson — guitar, backing vocals; Michael Gilbert — guitar, backing vocals; Jason Ward — bass, backing vocals; Craig Nielsen — drums	none
March 2000–August 2001	Eric "A. K." Knutson — lead vocals; Edward Carlson — guitar, backing vocals; Mark Simpson — guitar, backing vocals; Jason Ward — bass, backing vocals; Craig Nielsen — drums	My God (2001)
September–October 2001	James Rivera — lead vocals; Edward Carlson — guitar, backing vocals; Mark Simpson — guitar, backing vocals; Jason Ward — bass, backing vocals; Craig Nielsen — drums	none
Band inactive November 2001–April 2003
May 2003–March 2010	Eric "A. K." Knutson — lead vocals; Edward Carlson — guitar, backing vocals; Mark Simpson — guitar, backing vocals; Jason Ward — bass, backing vocals; Craig Nielsen — drums	Live in Phoenix (2004); Dreams of Death (2005); Live in Japan (2006); Once in a Deathtime (2008); The Cold (2010)
March–December 2010	Eric "A. K." Knutson — lead vocals; Mark Simpson — guitar, backing vocals; Michael Gilbert — guitar, backing vocals; Jason Ward — bass, backing vocals; Craig Nielsen — drums	none
December 2010–September 2011	Eric "A. K." Knutson — lead vocals; Michael Gilbert — guitar, backing vocals; Edward Carlson — guitar, backing vocals; Jason Ward — bass, backing vocals; Craig Nielsen — drums	none
September 2011–January 2013	Eric "A. K." Knutson — lead vocals; Michael Gilbert — guitar, backing vocals; Edward Carlson — guitar, backing vocals; Jason Ward — bass, backing vocals; Kelly David-Smith — drums, backing vocals	Ugly Noise (2012)
January–February 2013	Eric "A. K." Knutson — lead vocals; Michael Gilbert — guitar, backing vocals; Edward Carlson — guitar, backing vocals; Jeff Barbaree — bass, backing vocals (touring); Kelly David-Smith — drums, backing vocals	none
Spring 2013–March 2014	Eric "A. K." Knutson — lead vocals; Michael Gilbert — guitar, backing vocals; Edward Carlson — guitar, backing vocals; Michael Spencer — bass, backing vocals; Kelly David-Smith — drums, backing vocals	No Place for Disgrace 2014 (2014)
March–November 2014	Eric "A. K." Knutson — lead vocals; Michael Gilbert — guitar, backing vocals; Steve Conley — guitar, backing vocals; Michael Spencer — bass, backing vocals; Kelly David-Smith — drums, backing vocals	No Place for Disgrace 2014 (2014)
December 2014–May 2017	Eric "A. K." Knutson — lead vocals; Michael Gilbert — guitar, backing vocals; Steve Conley — guitar, backing vocals; Michael Spencer — bass, backing vocals; Jason Bittner — drums	Flotsam and Jetsam (2016)
July 2017–November 2020	Eric "A. K." Knutson — lead vocals; Michael Gilbert — guitar, backing vocals; Steve Conley — guitar, backing vocals; Michael Spencer — bass, backing vocals; Ken Mary — drums	The End of Chaos (2019)
November 2020–present	Eric "A. K." Knutson — lead vocals; Michael Gilbert — guitar, backing vocals; Steve Conley — guitar, backing vocals; Bill Bodily — bass, backing vocals; Ken Mary — drums	Blood in the Water (2019); I Am the Weapon (2024)
