= The Last Temptation of Reid =

Album by Lard

Studio album by Lard
- Released: September 1990
- Recorded: May 1990
- Studio: Chicago Trax Studios
- Genre: Industrial punk
- Length: 41:38 (Vinyl); 56:07 (CD and cassette)
- Label: Alternative Tentacles
- Producer: Hypo Luxa, Hermes Pan, Count Ringworm

Lard chronology
The Power of Lard (1989)	The Last Temptation of Reid (1990)	Pure Chewing Satisfaction (1997)

Professional ratings
Review scores
Source	Rating
AllMusic	3/5 stars

The Last Temptation of Reid is the debut studio album by Lard, released in 1990.

The album includes a cover of "They're Coming to Take Me Away, Ha-Haaa!", originally performed by Napoleon XIV, with the addition of a guitar part and an extra verse (written by Jello Biafra) to the original song's setup. The album also includes the song "Forkboy", which was used on the Natural Born Killers soundtrack and covered by Flotsam and Jetsam (on their album, High) and industrial rock act Black Light Burns.

The vinyl LP version of the album does not include the track "I Am Your Clock", which was instead released as a separate 12" Single.

The album's title is a reference to the Martin Scorsese film, The Last Temptation of Christ. A movie poster for the film is included in the liner notes of the album, only with the name "Reid" pasted over "Christ" in the title. "Reid" refers to Reid Hyams, who recorded the group's first EP, The Power of Lard, and co-owned Chicago Trax. A photo of Hyams can be seen on the back cover of the vinyl issue of the album and in the booklet of the CD.

The track "Forkboy" is probably a reference to Samuel R. Pierce Jr., during his tenure as the Secretary of Housing & Urban Development in the Reagan administration.

== Track listing ==
All songs written by Biafra/Jourgensen/Barker/Ward, except when noted.

1. "Forkboy" (Biafra, Jourgensen, Barker, Rieflin, Ward) – 3:53
2. "Pineapple Face" – 6:37
3. "Mate Spawn & Die" (Biafra, Jourgensen, Barker, Rieflin, Ward) – 4:55
4. "Drug Raid At 4 AM" – 5:01
5. "Can God Fill Teeth?" – 4:20
6. "Bozo Skeleton" – 4:30
7. "Sylvestre Matuschka" – 3:54
8. "They're Coming to Take Me Away" – 8:28 (N. Bonaparte)
9. "I Am Your Clock" – 15:29

== Personnel ==
=== Lard ===
- Jello Biafra – lead vocals, deprogramming, sleeve concept, back cover photo
- Alien Jourgensen – guitars, programming, production
- Paul Barker – bass, programming, production
- Jeff Ward – drums (2, 4–9), vocals

=== Additional personnel ===
- William Rieflin – drums (1, 3)
- Jeff Newell – engineer
- Winston Smith – front cover artwork & "Ant People" (rear cover artwork)
- John Yates – sleeve design

== Charts ==
Chart performance for The Last Temptation of Reid
Chart (1990)	Peak position
UK Albums (OCC)	69
