= Cuatro (album) =

Studio album by Flotsam and Jetsam
- Released: October 13, 1992
- Recorded: 1992
- Studio: Dodge City Sound, Glendale, California
- Genre: Heavy metal; thrash metal; groove metal
- Length: 51:53
- Label: MCA
- Producer: Neil Kernon

Flotsam and Jetsam chronology
When the Storm Comes Down (1990)	Cuatro (1992)	Drift (1995)

Professional ratings
Review scores
Source	Rating
AllMusic	2.5/5 stars
Rock Hard	10/10 stars

Cuatro (meaning "four" in Spanish) is the fourth studio album by American heavy metal band Flotsam and Jetsam, released on October 13, 1992 via MCA Records. This was the band's first album with bassist Jason Ward, who had replaced Troy Gregory the year before.

While Cuatro continued the experimentation with a progressive/technical sound that began on Flotsam and Jetsam's previous album, When the Storm Comes Down, it saw them move to a rather slower, slightly more melodic approach. Similar to its predecessor, Cuatro's lyrical themes are more about politics and society as opposed to the occult and evil themes that were used on the band's first two albums, Doomsday for the Deceiver and No Place for Disgrace.

The album was re-released on May 13, 2008 by Metal Mind Productions, remastered with five bonus tracks and limited to 2,000 copies. The re-release also contains new packaging and liner notes from band members Eric A.K., Jason Ward and Ed Carlson.

Chris Cornell of Soundgarden co-wrote "The Message" and is credited as Christopher Cornell.

== Track listing ==
All songs written by Edward Carlson, Eric A. Knutson, Jason Ward, Kelly Smith, Michael Gilbert and Eric Braverman, except where noted.

No.	Title	Writer(s)	Length
1.	"Natural Enemies"		3:35
2.	"Swatting at Flies"		4:03
3.	"The Message"	Carlson, Knutson, Ward, Smith, Gilbert, Cornell	4:32
4.	"Cradle Me Now"	Carlson, Knutson, Ward, Smith, Gilbert	4:04
5.	"Wading Through the Darkness"		6:06
6.	"Double Zero"		3:43
7.	"Never to Reveal"		4:16
8.	"Forget About Heaven"		4:47
9.	"Secret Square"		5:21
10.	"Hypodermic Midnight Snack"		3:46
11.	"Are You Willing"		4:00
12.	"(Ain't Nothing Gonna) Save This World"		3:45

2008 Metal Mind re-release bonus tracks
No.	Title	Writer(s)	Length
13.	"Date with Hate"	Carlson, Knutson, Ward, Smith, Gilbert, Ellefson	4:14
14.	"Wading Through the Darkness" (radio edit)		5:50
15.	"Wading Through the Darkness" (industrial mix)		4:39
16.	"Cradle Me Now" (edited version)		3:48
17.	"Wading Through the Darkness" (video)		5:49

== Personnel ==
Credits are adapted from the liner notes.

- Eric A.K. – lead, background vocals
- Edward Carlson – guitars, background vocals
- Michael Gilbert – guitars, background vocals
- Jason B. Ward – bass, background vocals
- Kelly David-Smith – drums, background vocals

=== Other ===
- Orchestration on "Forget About Heaven" by Michael Gilbert; performed by Neil Kernon

=== Production ===
- Produced by Neil Kernon
- Eric Braverman – co-producer, production co-ordinator and the sixth Flotsam
- Mixed at Pakaderm Studios, Los Alamitos, California
- Recorded, engineered and mixed by Neil Kernon. Assistant engineers: Michelle Schindler, A.J. Justico
- Doug Beiden, J.R. McNeely – mixing assistants
- Howie Weinberg – mastering
