= Rango: Music from the Motion Picture =

2011 soundtrack album by Hans Zimmer

Soundtrack album by Hans Zimmer
- Released: February 28, 2011
- Studios: Newman Scoring Stage, 20th Century Fox Studios; Remote Control Productions
- Genres: Mexican folk; flamenco jazz; Latin pop; salsa; mariachi
- Length: 34:18
- Labels: Anti-; Epitaph
- Producer: Hans Zimmer

Hans Zimmer chronology
How Do You Know (2010)	Rango (2011)	Pirates of the Caribbean: On Stranger Tides (2011)

Singles from Rango: Music from the Motion Picture
- 1. "Best Day of My Life (Minor Key)" Released: February 7, 2011

Rango: Music from the Motion Picture is the soundtrack to the Gore Verbinski-directed 2011 film of the same name released on February 28, 2011 by Anti- and Epitaph Records. The film is composed and arranged by Verbinski's frequent collaborator Hans Zimmer in his sixth collaboration with the director. In addition to Zimmer's score accompanying most of the album, it also featured songs performed by singer-songwriter Rick Garcia, Latin rock band Los Lobos, and hardcore punk/industrial band Lard.

== Background ==
To create authentic Mexican music for the film, Zimmer recruited musicians and bands from that country. David Hidalgo, the principal band member of Los Lobos felt that "They could do it on their own, but it sounded funny. It didn't sound authentic. So they needed some Mexicans in there. That doesn't sound kosher and it doesn't sound right to say it that way, but in a way it is. You need someone who knows this music, someone to play it properly and get the real effect. That's why they called us in."

The band recorded music to be used throughout the film, and were directed to write a number of pieces lasting from 30 to 90 seconds. They also recorded couple of tracks to the rough edits of the film. Hidalgo said "They had ideas on what they wanted to do, but we weren't really in on that. So we just kept giving them material to work with, and I don't even know how it's used. I can't wait to see it." The band performed the title theme that was released as a single on February 7, 2011, that served as an anchor to the soundtrack. The theme had references to Ennio Morricone's western themes and Ned Washington and Dimitri Tiomkin's 1958 single "Rawhide".

Peter Miller who worked as a sound engineer for Rango, had admitted that he structured several pieces on the music which became its domain. On the mixing, Verbinski instructed Miller on the structure of sound so well, as he was conscious on allowing the sound to have its moment, rather than having wall-to-wall music. He further praised Zimmer's composition on "walking a very difficult line between not handing off just another Morricone Western pastiche, and still capturing the flavor of Westerns that so much tip their hat to Morricone".

== Track listing ==
No.	Title	Writer(s)	Artist(s)	Length
1.	"Welcome Amigo"	Gore Verbinski; James Ward Byrkit; Kenneth Karman; Rick Garcia	Garcia	1:06
2.	"Rango Suite"	Hans Zimmer	Zimmer	5:57
3.	"Certain Demise"	Heitor Pereira	Zimmer	0:24
4.	"Medley – It's A Metaphore / Forkboy"	Zimmer; Jello Biafra; Paul Barker; Al Jourgensen; Jeff Ward; Bill Rieflin	Zimmer; Lard	0:43
5.	"Welcome to Dirt"	Zimmer	Zimmer	0:58
6.	"Name's Rango"	Zimmer	Zimmer	1:31
7.	"Lizard For Lunch"	Zimmer	José Hernández; Anthony Zuniga; Robert Lopez	1:26
8.	"Stuck In Guacamole"	Pereira	Zimmer	0:21
9.	"Underground"	David Thum; John Thum	Zimmer	3:18
10.	"We Ride, Really!"	Zimmer	Zimmer	0:50
11.	"Rango And Beans"	Zimmer	Zimmer	1:04
12.	"Medley – Bats / Rango Theme / Ride Of The Valkryies / An Der Schonen Blauen Donau, OP. 314"	Zimmer; D. Thum; J. Thum; Richard Wagner; Johann Strauss II	Zimmer	4:28
13.	"The Bank's Been Robbed"	Verbinski; Byrkit; Karman; Garcia	Rick Garcia	0:22
14.	"Rango Returns"	Zimmer	Zimmer	1:16
15.	"La Muerte A Llegado"	Verbinski; Byrkit; Karman; Garcia	Garcia; George DelHoyo	0:44
16.	"It's A Miracle"	Zimmer	Zimmer	1:57
17.	"El Canelo"	Traditional	Los Lobos	0:44
18.	"The Sunset Shot"	Zimmer	Zimmer	0:53
19.	"Best Day of My Life (American Authors)"	D. Thum; J. Thum	Lobos; Arturo Sandoval	3:12
20.	"Best Day of My Life (Minor Key)"	D. Thum; J. Thum	Lobos	3:29
Total length:				34:40

== Reception ==
Mike Eisenberg of Screen Rant called it as one of his best works he did for an animated film and said that "Zimmer sprinkles some of the most powerful moments from Pirates of the Caribbean, Broken Arrow and Sherlock Holmes." He concluded "The Rango soundtrack is definitely worth a purchase for any soundtrack (as well as music) fans. It shows off the film's range as an epic Western and a comedic movie for families. On top of the music, there are nice transitions that include dialogue from the film, all of which is pretty funny." James Christopher Monger of AllMusic wrote "Zimmer and Los Lobos successfully spin spaghetti Western clichés, swashbuckling orchestral cues, and Mexican folk music into a real gem."

Filmtracks.com wrote "the music for Rango achieves its goals, and Zimmer's army of assistants managed to supply the score with the appropriate stream of parody. But at the end of the day, there's very little unique substance to be heard in this score, and the choppy album presentation won't likely appeal to film score collectors. While Zimmer has produced some outstanding music for animation in the past, this one is unfortunately closer to the format and quality of the Madagascar scores. With many of the cues overlaid with dialogue from the film, the Rango soundtrack album is clearly meant as a souvenir for enthusiasts of the film, as such succeeding in emulating the wacky personality when heard in context. Otherwise, it's a lightweight effort from Zimmer, one that once again proves his immense capability in regards to coordinating the talent around him."

James Southall of Movie Wave wrote "This is an album containing a surprising amount of really good, enjoyable music. Sadly, it is not a good album. 37 minutes long, containing 20 tracks, shows one problem – the music flits all over the place. The bigger problem – several of the tracks feature dialogue. Perhaps it didn't occur to the record company that if someone wanted to experience the music together with the film's dialogue then they'd watch the film. Those who want to enjoy the music without the dialogue can't. Along with all this are a couple of fun songs by Los Lobos. "Fun" is the best word to describe the whole thing – a shame about how it's presented, but it is still entertaining and those who think Zimmer is at his best when he's just essentially having a bit of a laugh ought to love it."

Todd McCarthy of The Hollywood Reporter said that the score "reworks the sound of Ennio Morricone's celebrated scores for Leone in ways that are exciting, sometimes comic but never silly". Simon Brew of Den of Geek complimented Zimmer's score as "his best score in years". A. O. Scott of The New York Times said that "[Hans] Zimmer's score chews up great mouthfuls of Ennio Morricone-style spaghetti".

== Accolades ==
Award	Category	Recipient(s)	Result
ASCAP Awards	Top Box Office Films	Hans Zimmer	Won
International Film Music Critics Association	Best Original Score for an Animated Film	Hans Zimmer	Nominated
World Soundtrack Awards	Soundtrack Composer of the Year (Note: Also for Inception, How Do You Know, Megamind, Pirates of the Caribbean: On Stranger Tides, The Dilemma, Rango, Kung Fu Panda 2.)	Hans Zimmer	Nominated

== Personnel ==
Credits adapted from CD liner notes.

- Score composer, arranger, and producer – Hans Zimmer
- Synth programming – Jacob Shea, Nick Delaplane
- Arrangements – Adam Peters, Dominic Lewis, Geoff Zanelli, Heitor Pereira, John Sponsler, Lorne Balfe, Michael Levine, Tom Gire
- Recording – John Avila, Kevin Globerman, Slamm Andrews, Alan Meyerson
- Mixing – Alan Meyerson
- Editor – Peter Oso Snell
- Assistant editor – Jeannie Lee Marks
- Technical engineer – Andrew Kawczynski, Chuck Choi, Dave Fleming, Jason Goldberg, Josh Lynch, Michael Meehan, Phill Bougher, Thomas Broderick
- Assistant engineer – Satoshi Noguchi
- Music consultant – Bob Badami
- Executive producer – Gore Verbinski

Instruments

- Accordion – Frank Marocco
- Bass – Bruce Morgenthaler, David Parmeter, Drew Dembowski, Edward Meares, Michael Valerio, Nico Carmine Abondolo, Oscar Hidalgo
- Bassoon – Allen Savedoff, Damian A. Montano, John Steinmetz, Katherine R. Oliver, Kenneth Munday, Rose Corrigan
- Cello – Andrew T. Shulman, Antony Cooke, Armen Ksajikian, Christina Soule, Christine Ermacoff, Dane Little, David Speltz, Dennis Karmazyn, Erika Duke-Kirkpatrick, George Kim Scholes, Jennifer Lee Kuhn, Martin Tillmann, Paul Cohen, Paula Hochhalter, Steve Erdody
- Clarinet – Donald Foster, Gary Bovyer, Ralph Williams, Stuart Clark
- Flute – Geraldine Rotella, Heather Clark
- Guitar – George Doering, Gregor Verbinski, Heitor Pereira, Peter G. Adams, Davey Johnstone, David Hidalgo
- Harmonica – Jimmie Wood
- Horn – Brian O'Connor, Daniel P. Kelley, David Everson, David Duke, Dylan S. Hart, Eric Overholt, James Thatcher, Jenny L. Kim, Joseph Meyer, Justin E. Hageman, Katelyn L. Faraudo, Mark L. Adams, Phillip Edward Yao, Steven Becknell, Yvonne Suzette Moriarty
- Oboe – Barbara Northcutt, Chris Bleth, Phillip Ayling
- Percussion – Ryeland Allison
- Strings – Craig Eastman, Michael Hobe
- Trombone – Alexander Iles, William Reichenbach, Charles Loper, Phillip Teele, Steven M. Holtman
- Trumpet – Arturo Sandoval, Jon Lewis, Malcolm Mc Nab, Rick Baptist, Roberto Diaz, Walter Fowler
- Trumpet, Soloist – Arturo Sandoval
- Tuba – Doug Tornquist, Gary Hickman, William Roper
- Viola – Andrew Duckles, Brian Dembow, Darrin McCann, David F. Walther, Keith Greene, Maria Newman, Marlow Fisher, Roland Kato, Scott C. Hosfeld, Shawn Mann, Thomas Diener, Victoria Miskolczy
- Violin – Alan Grunfeld, Amy Hershberger, Bruce Dukov, Chang Qu, Darius Campo, Dimitrie Leivici, Elizabeth Johnson, Endre Granat, Erick Hernandez, Eun-Mee Ahn, Helen Nightengale, Irina Voloshina, Jacqueline Brand, Jeanne Skrocki, Jessica E. Guideri, Josefina Vergara, Julie Ann Gigante, Katia Popov, Lisa M. Sutton, Sazer, Marc, Michael A. Levine, Natalie Leggett, Phillip Levy, Rafael Rishik, Searmi Park, Serena McKinney, Steven Zander, Tamara Hatwan, Tereza L. Stanislav

Orchestra

- Orchestra conductor – Nick Glennie-Smith
- Orchestra contractor – Peter Rotter, Sandy de Crescent
- Orchestra co-ordinator – Lori Falzone Chavez
- Orchestration – Elizabeth Finch, Kevin Kaska, Rick Giovinazzo, Walter E. Fowler, Yvonne S. Moriarty
- Supervising orchestrator – Bruce Fowler
