= I Am the Weapon =

I Am the Weapon may refer to:

- "I Am the Weapon" (song), a 2022 single by Three Days Grace
- I Am the Weapon (album), a 2024 album by Flotsam and Jetsam
