= They're Coming to Take Me Away, Ha-Haaa! =

1966 single by Napoleon XIV

- West German picture sleeve

Single by Napoleon XIV
- B-side: "!aaaH-aH ,yawA eM ekaT oT gnimoC er'yehT"
- Released: July 1966
- Genre: Novelty
- Length: 2:10
- Label: Warner Bros. #5831
- Songwriter: N. Bonaparte (Jerry Samuels)
- Producer: A Jepalana Production

Napoleon XIV singles chronology
"They're Coming to Take Me Away, Ha-Haaa!" (1966)	"I'm in Love with My Little Red Tricycle" (1966)

Audio
- "They're Coming to Take Me Away, Ha-Haaa!" on YouTube

"They're Coming to Take Me Away, Ha-Haaa!" is a 1966 novelty record written and performed by Jerry Samuels (billed as Napoleon XIV), and released on Warner Bros. Records. The song became an instant success in the United States, peaking at No. 3 on the Billboard Hot 100 popular music singles chart on August 13, No. 1 on the Cash Box Top 100 Pop Singles charts, No. 2 in Canada, and No. 4 on the UK Singles Chart.

== Lyrics ==
The lyrics present a first-person narrator who seems to be addressing a lost love, describing his descent into madness and joyfully anticipating being taken to a psychiatric hospital. However, the final verse reveals that the narrator is actually addressing a runaway dog: "They'll find you yet, and when they do, they'll put you in the ASPCA, you mangy mutt!"

Samuels feared that the song would be perceived as disrespectful towards those with mental illness, and deliberately worded the last line so "you realize that the person is talking about a dog having left him, not a human". Said Samuels, "I felt it would cause some people to say 'Well, it's all right.' And it did. It worked."

== Song structure and technical background ==
Samuels was inspired by the rhythm of the old Scottish tune "The Campbells Are Coming". The song is driven by a snare drum, bass drum, tambourine and hand clap rhythm. The vocal is spoken rhythmically rather than sung melodically, while the vocal pitch rises and falls at key points to create an unusual glissando effect, augmented by the sound of wailing sirens.

In a 1966 interview, Samuels said that he did not consider the piece a song and instead considered it a "recitation", because there is no melody and no harmonies. In the same interview he also said that the piece took him 9 months to complete.

According to Samuels, the vocal pitch shift was achieved by manipulating the recording speed of his vocal track, a multitrack variation on the technique used by Ross Bagdasarian in creating the original Chipmunks novelty songs. At the time the song was written, Samuels was working as a recording engineer at Associated Recording Studios in New York. Samuels used a variable-frequency oscillator to alter the 60 Hz frequency of the hysteresis motor of a multitrack tape recording machine. He first recorded the rhythm track, then overdubbed the vocal track while slowing the tape at the end of each chorus (and reciting the words in time with the slowing beat), so when it was played back at normal speed, the tempo would be steady but the pitch of his voice would rise. Some tracks were treated with intermittent tape-based echo effects created by an Echoplex. Samuels also layered in siren effects that gradually rose and fell with the pitch of his vocals.

== B-side ==
Continuing the theme of insanity, the flip or B-side of the single was simply the A-side played in reverse, and given the title "!aaaH-aH ,yawA eM ekaT oT gnimoC er'yehT" (or "Ha-Haaa! Away, Me Take to Coming They're") and the performer billed as "XIV NAPOLEON". Most of the label affixed to the B-side was a mirror image of the front label (as opposed to simply being spelled backward), including the letters in the "WB" shield logo. Only the label name, disclaimer, and record and recording master numbers were kept frontward. The reverse version of the song is not included on the original Warner Bros. album, although the title is shown on the front cover, where the title is actually spelled backward.

In his Book of Rock Lists, rock music critic Dave Marsh calls the B-side the "most obnoxious song ever to appear in a jukebox", saying the recording once "cleared out a diner of forty patrons in two minutes flat".

== Airplay ==
The song charted at No. 3 on the Billboard Hot 100 charts on August 13, No. 1 on the Cash Box Top 100 charts on July 30, No. 2 in Canada, and No. 4 on the UK Singles Chart.

Warner Bros. Records reissued the original single (#7726) in 1973. It entered the Billboard Hot 100 at No. 87 but stalled at No. 101 at the Week Ahead charts which was an addition to the Cash Box Top 100 charts. The reissue featured the "Burbank/palm trees" label. As with the original release, the labels for the reissue's B-side also included mirror-imaged print except for the disclaimer, record catalog, and track master numbers. The "Burbank" motto at the top of the label was also kept frontward as well as the "WB" letters in the shield logo, which had been printed in reverse on the originals.

== Chart history ==
Chart (1966)	Peak position
Australia (Kent Music Report)	4
Canada RPM Top Singles	2
UK	4
U.S. Billboard Hot 100	3
U.S. Cash Box Top 100	1

== Sequels ==
"I'm Happy They Took You Away, Ha-Haaa!" was recorded by versatile voice actress Bryna Raeburn, credited as "Josephine XV", and was the closing track on side two of the 1966 Warner Bros. album. Josephine was the name of the spouse of the French Emperor Napoleon Bonaparte.

A variation of "They're Coming to Take Me Away, Ha-Haaa!" was also done by Jerry Samuels on the same album, titled "The Place Where the Nuts Hunt the Squirrels", where Samuels, towards the end of the track, repeats the line: "they're trying to drive me sane" before the song's fade, in a fast-tracked higher voice.

In 1966, "They Took You Away, I'm Glad, I'm Glad" appeared on These Are the Hits, You Silly Savage by Teddy & Darrel.

In 1966, KRLA disc jockey "Emperor Bob" Hudson recorded a similarly styled song titled "I'm Normal", including the lines "They came and took my brother away/The men in white picked him up yesterday/But they'll never come take me away, 'cause I'm okay/I'm normal." Another line in the song was: "I eat my peas with a tuning fork." The record was credited simply to "The Emperor".

In 1988, Samuels wrote and recorded "They're Coming to Get Me Again, Ha-Haaa!", a sequel to the original record. It was released two years later, but never charted. In the song, the narrator has been discharged from the mental hospital, but has not been fully cured of his insanity and fears of being readmitted. At the end of the song, he exclaims, "Oh, no!" followed by the sound of a door slamming, signifying his confinement back within the asylum.

The recording appeared on disc releases by Dr. Demento in 1975 as part of Dr. Demento's Delights, then in subsequent Dr. Demento LP records released in 1985, 1988 and 1991.

In 1996, BP created an ad campaign to air during winter to promote their BP93 gasoline, which they promised would protect vehicles from getting their engines frozen, licensing the song and changing the lyrics to, "I don't know what came over me / I didn't fuel up at BP / Now I've got fuel-line freeze-up, see / And They're Coming to Tow Me Away".

== Cover versions ==
Many cover versions of the song were recorded following the song's release in 1966. Kim Fowley released a cover of the song as his second single, after "The Trip". Industrial rock band Lard covered the song on their 1990 album The Last Temptation of Reid.

Norwegian band Brothers recorded a version which featured Olga-Marie Mikalsen. It was released in 1994.

Children of Bodom used to open their live concerts by playing the song.

== See also ==
- "Fire" (Kids See Ghosts song)
