= The Power of Lard =

EP by Lard
- Released: 1989
- Recorded: 1988 at Chicago Trax Studios
- Genre: Industrial rock, industrial metal
- Length: 43:28
- Label: Alternative Tentacles
- Producer: Hypo Luxa, Hermes Pan, Count Ringworm

Lard chronology
The Power of Lard (1989)	The Last Temptation of Reid (1990)

Professional ratings
Review scores
Source	Rating
AllMusic	2.5/5 stars
MusicHound Rock	2.5/5 stars
Punknews.org	3.5/5 stars

The Power of Lard is the debut EP by Lard, released in 1989.

== Critical reception ==
Trouser Press wrote that "Biafra contributes a voice, label and sense of humor. That gets matched up to pounding, semi-industrialized rock by Ministry guitarist Al Jourgensen, bassist Paul Barker and drummer Jeff Ward. A casual and exciting bit of supergrouping, The Power of Lard (a three-song 12-inch) demonstrates the fun potential in this seemingly unlikely alliance." Jerry Smith, reviewer of British music newspaper Music Week, was disappointed by this result of collaboration of different musicians. He wrote "Sadly, it is all rather predictable".

== Use in Welcome to Hell ==
The track "The Power of Lard" was used as the introduction song in the popular skateboarding video "Toy Machine - Welcome to Hell (1996)". This video became culturally significant in skateboarding and caused a resurgence in popularity for the EP.

== Track listing ==
All tracks are written by Lard.

No.	Title	Length
1.	"The Power of Lard"	7:29
2.	"Hellfudge"	5:04
3.	"Time to Melt"	31:55
Total length:		43:28

== Personnel ==
=== Lard ===
- Al Jourgensen – guitar, production
- Paul Barker – bass guitar, production
- Jeff Ward – drums
- Jello Biafra – vocals, production, sleeve concept

=== Additional Personnel ===
- Keith Auerbach – engineer
- Steve Spapperi – engineer
- Reid Hyams – recording
- John Yates – "cut, paste, and pseudo-mechanics"
- Jason Traeger – logo

== Charts ==
Chart (1989)	Peak position
UK Indie Chart	4
