= 70's Rock Must Die =

EP by Lard
- Released: 1 February 2000
- Recorded: May 1990, 1991–1992, 1995–1997
- Genres: Industrial rock, punk rock
- Length: 18:27
- Label: Alternative Tentacles
- Producers: Hypo Luxa, Hermes Pan, Marshall Lawless, Big Abner

Lard chronology
Pure Chewing Satisfaction (1997)	70's Rock Must Die (2000)

Professional ratings
Review scores
Source	Rating
AllMusic	3/5 stars
Kerrang!	5/5 stars
Metal Hammer	8/10

70's Rock Must Die is an EP by Lard, released in 2000.

== Track listing ==
No.	Title	Length
1.	"70s Rock Must Die"	7:07
2.	"Volcanus 2000 (We Wipe the World)"	6:14
3.	"Ballad of Marshall Ledbetter"	5:06

== Personnel ==
=== Lard ===
- Al Jourgensen – guitars, keys, programming, production
- Paul Barker – bass, keys, programming, backing vocals (1), production
- Jello Biafra – vocals, production

=== Additional Personnel ===
- Jeff Ward – drums (1)
- Bill Rieflin – drums (3)
- Mike Scaccia – guitars (3)
- Chuck McMillan – backing vocals (1)
- Dirk Flanngan – backing vocals (1)
- Jeff "Critter" Newell – engineer, backing vocals (1)
- Keith Robbins – backing vocals (1)
- Matt Schultz – backing vocals (1)
- Steve Silver – backing vocals (1)
- Brad Kopplin – engineer
