= Brothers (band) =

Norwegian band

- Origin: Norway
- Genres: Hard rock; blues rock; rock and roll; Hip hop; Rap; Funk; Dance
- Years active: 1993–present
- Labels: Vertigo; PolyGram AS, Oslo
- Members: Taiwo Karlsen; Kehinde Karlsen
- Website: www.funkyass.no

Brothers is a Norwegian funk rock band that had an international #1 in 1993 with their cover of AC/DC's hit song, "Back in Black".

== Background ==
The group is made up of twin brothers, Kehinde and Taiwo Karlsen. They hail from Velelstad in Norway. During their career, they have collaborated with Olga-Marie Mikalsen. The brothers recorded their version of the classic AC/DC single, "Back in Black" which brought them overnight success. It became one of the top-selling singles in Norway for 1993.

== Career ==
In 1994, they released their album, Two for the Price of One in 1994. It contained songs such as "Purple Haze", "I Love Rock And Roll", and "They're Coming to Take Me Away, Ha-Ha-A-A".

According to a 2018 article on Brønnøysunds Avis (a local newspaper in Brønnøysund Norway), the brothers performed a 45-minute set on stage. Unfortunately, the audience wasn't that receptive.

== Discography ==
=== Singles ===
Title	Released	Tracks
"Back in Black"	1993	(01) "Back In Black" (Full Power Mix) 3:38, (02) "Back In Black" (Extended Club Mix) 5:05, (03) "Back In Black" (Club Mix Radio Edit) 4:01
"Brothers" - Featuring Olga Marie Mikalsen	1994	01. "They´re Coming To Take Me Away.Ha-Ha-aa (Radio?Mix) 3:32; 02. "Purple Haze" (Jimi Hendrix Cover) 3:12; 03. "They´re Coming To Take Me Away. Ha-Ha-aa" (Napoleon XIV Mix) 3:32; 04. "Aa-Ah-Ah. Yawa Em Ekat Ot Gnimoc Er´yeht" 3:32
"Treat You Like a Lady"	2001	01. "Treat You Like a Lady" (radio version) 4:05; 02. "Treat You Like a Lady" (kareoke version) 4:05

=== Albums ===
Title	Released	Tracks
Two For The Price of One	1994	01. "Yoroba Tribe Dance" 1:32; 02. "Bad, Bad, Boy" 3:32; 03. "Back in Black" (AC/DC) 3:36; 04. "I Love Rock 'N Roll" (The Arrows) 2:54; 05. "They're Coming To Take Me Away, Ha-Ha-A-A" 4:32; 06. "Get Da Funk Out Of My Face" 2:53; 07. "Crazy Horses" 3:00; 08. "Cover of the Rolling Stone" (Dr. Hook) 3:02; 09. "Go To Hell" (Alice Cooper) 3:53; 10. "The Frank Sinatra Experience: We Will Rock You" (Queen) 2:49; 11. "Black Betty" 2:56; 12. "Purple Haze" (Hendrix) 8:32
