= Olga Marie Mikalsen =

- Born: 9 January 1915; Langevåg, Norway
- Died: 23 January 2006 (aged 91) Valenciana, Spain
- Genres: Classical
- Instrument: Voice
- Years active: 1968 - 1990s

Olga Marie Mikalsen was a singer and occasional actress from Norway who had her own style of singing.

== Background ==
Olga Marie Mikalsen has been described as one of the most unique singing stars that Norway has ever heard. Her vocal uniqueness may in part be due to an early bout of tuberculosis.

She was born in 1915 in Langevåg. She was one of eleven children. Her family all sang in choirs. Unlike her sisters who had beautiful soprano voices, she was the odd one out. They said she had an ugly voice.

It was at the age of 40 that whilst walking in Frogner Park singing to herself that she encountered an entourage. One of them, a man who played the cello for the Norwegian Radio Orchestra told her that she had a natural talent and should start singing seriously. According to the NRK article, '"Da Olga Marie sang, lo publikum så tårene trillet" by Oddvin Aune, the question is, was this genuine or ironic?

After studying music and taking lessons, she was told that a voice like hers came along once in every 300 years. By the early 1980s she had become something of a cult figure in Oslo.

It was her interpretation of "Hooray for you who have your birthday" in a commercial that boosted her celebrity status to a national level.

== Career ==
It was 1968 when Olga Marie Mikalsen made her debut at the age of 53. At that time, her singing style which has been described as an agogic singing style, didn't catch on. Norway wasn't ready for it. But by the 1980s, she had an audience.

Olga Marie Mikalsen appeared on the 1994 CD single, "They're Coming to Take Me Away. Ha-Ha-aa" which was credited to Brothers Featuring Olga-Marie Mikalsen.

As per the 20 April 1997 issue of New York Magazine, she was to make her New York debut at Weill Recital Hall at Carnegie Hall, accompanied by pianist Roderick Kettlewell on Thursday 16 April.

It was announced by Vikebladet Vestposten on Thursday 8 January 2015 that on the following day, Friday 9 January, a live CD of Olga Marie Mikalsen's recordings would be released. This day was the hundredth year from when she was born. The contents included performances she did with Con Moto and conductor Svein Eiksund on a day in the spring of 1988.

== Death ==
Olga Marie Mikalsen died at age 91 in Valenciana, Spain on 23 January 2006.

== Discography ==
Singles
Act	Release	Catalogue	Year	Notes
Brothers Featuring Olga-Marie Mikalsen	1. "They're Coming to Take Me Away. Ha-Ha-aa" (Radio?Mix); 2. "Purple Haze"; 3. "They're Coming To Take Me Away. Ha-Ha-aa" (Napoleon XIV Mix); 4. "Aa-Ah-Ah. Yawa Em Ekat Ot Gnimoc Er´yeht"	Vertigo 858 301–2	1994	

Albums
Act	Release	Catalogue	Year	Notes
Olga Marie Mikalsen	Live Recording	Fermat FLPS 48		Sweden LP issue
Olga Marie Mikalsen	Olga Synger Solo	Tylden & Co GTACD 8026	1994	CD reissue of Fermat FLPS 48
Olga Marie Mikalsen	Olga Synger Solo	Tylden & Co GTAMC 8026	1994	Cassette reissue of Fermat FLPS 48
Olga Marie Mikalsen	Olga Marie 100 År - Live at Ulsteinvik	Tylden & Co GTACD 8577	2015	CD
