= High (Flotsam and Jetsam album) =

Studio album by Flotsam and Jetsam
- Released: June 3, 1997
- Recorded: 1996–1997
- Studio: Vintage Recorders, Phoenix, Arizona
- Genre: Thrash metal
- Label: Metal Blade Records
- Producer: Bill Metoyer & Flotsam and Jetsam

Flotsam and Jetsam chronology
Drift (1995)	High (1997)	Unnatural Selection (1999)

Professional ratings
Review scores
Source	Rating
AllMusic	3/5 stars
Rock Hard	8/10 stars

High is the sixth album by American thrash metal band Flotsam and Jetsam, released on June 3, 1997. It was their first release on Metal Blade Records since 1986's Doomsday for the Deceiver, whereas their previous three albums were released on MCA.

High marked the first time the band had kept their lineup intact for more than two albums, although, until 2012's Ugly Noise, it was their last album with guitarist Michael Gilbert and drummer Kelly David Smith.

Similar to Flotsam and Jetsam's previous three albums, the lyricial content of High is centered around politics and society, and expands on the band's sense of humor documented from its predecessor Drift.

== Track listing ==
No.	Title	Length
1.	"Final Step"	6:40
2.	"Hallucinational"	3:16
3.	"It's On Me"	3:24
4.	"High Noon"	5:19
5.	"Your Hands"	3:28
6.	"Monster"	3:41
7.	"Lucky Day"	4:53
8.	"Toast"	2:56
9.	"High"	3:31
10.	"Everything"	6:02
11.	"Forkboy" (Lard cover)	3:54
12.	"Surgery" (Japanese edition bonus track)	4:00

== Credits ==
- Kelly David-Smith – drums
- Edward Carlson – guitars
- Eric A.K. – vocals
- Jason Ward – bass
- Michael Gilbert – guitars
