= My God (album) =

Studio album by Flotsam and Jetsam
- Released: May 22, 2001
- Recorded: October 2000–January 2001
- Studio: Vintage Recorders, Phoenix, Arizona
- Genre: Thrash metal
- Length: 55:29
- Label: Metal Blade Records
- Producer: Bill Metoyer and Flotsam and Jetsam

Flotsam and Jetsam chronology
Unnatural Selection (1999)	My God (2001)	Dreams of Death (2005)

Professional ratings
Review scores
Source	Rating
Allmusic	4/5 stars

My God is the eighth album by the thrash metal band Flotsam and Jetsam. It was released on May 22, 2001 and was their last release on Metal Blade Records until the 2013 reissue of Ugly Noise.

My God sees Flotsam and Jetsam continuing the return to their thrashy sound on its predecessor Unnatural Selection, and expanding on the lyrical content of their 1990s material, with themes related to politics, religion and social issues.

== Track listing ==
No.	Title	Length
1.	"Dig Me Up To Bury Me"	5:46
2.	"Keep Breathing"	5:08
3.	"Nothing To Say"	5:19
4.	"Weather To Do"	5:21
5.	"Camera Eye"	3:48
6.	"Trash"	4:34
7.	"Praise"	2:02
8.	"My God"	5:24
9.	"Learn To Dance"	4:26
10.	"Frustrate"	3:28
11.	"Killing Time"	5:27
12.	"I.A.M.H."	13:41

Hidden track

- The final song of the album, "I.A.M.H.," contains a hidden song. The central part of the instrumental track ends at 6:06 and the hidden song starts after 2:00 of silence. After which an Acoustic Version of "Trash" plays for 5:35.

== Credits ==
- Edward Carlson : guitars
- Eric A.K. : vocals
- Jason Ward : bass guitar
- Craig Nielsen : drums
- Mark Simpson : guitars
- Tory Edwards : violin
