= When the Storm Comes Down =

Studio album by Flotsam and Jetsam
- Released: May 1, 1990
- Recorded: 1989–1990
- Studio: Pyramid Sound, Ithaca, New York; Electric Lady Studios, New York City; Fantasy Studios, Berkeley, California
- Genre: Thrash metal; speed metal
- Length: 49:25
- Label: MCA Records (US); MCA/WEA (Europe)
- Producer: Alex Perialas

Flotsam and Jetsam chronology
No Place for Disgrace (1988)	When the Storm Comes Down (1990)	Cuatro (1992)

When the Storm Comes Down is the third studio album by thrash metal band Flotsam and Jetsam, released in 1990. It was the last album with Troy Gregory on bass guitar, as he left the band in 1991 to join Prong. It was also the first Flotsam and Jetsam album released on MCA Records, and the first not to include songwriting contributions by former bassist Jason Newsted, having co-written material for their first two albums, and having since joined Metallica.

When the Storm Comes Down saw Flotsam and Jetsam take a different direction from their previous two albums, both musically and lyrically, and is the band's only record to be produced by Alex Perialas. The lyrical content of this album includes elements of political and social commentary, mirroring much of the dark and occult-related material from the band's first two albums, Doomsday for the Deceiver and No Place for Disgrace. The album also saw the band starting to move towards a progressive-oriented sound, and its production value has been compared to that of Testament's Practice What You Preach, which was also produced by Perialas and released just before the recording sessions of When the Storm Comes Down started.

It was re-released on June 10, 2008 by Metal Mind Productions. This re-release was a remaster with a bonus track, then limited to 2000 copies; it contains new packaging and liner notes from band members Eric A.K. and Ed Carlson.

Professional ratings
Review scores
Source	Rating
Allmusic	4/5 stars

== Track listing ==
No.	Title	Length
1.	"The Master Sleeps"	4:37
2.	"Burned Device"	6:26
3.	"Deviation"	3:03
4.	"October Thorns"	5:34
5.	"No More Fun"	3:45
6.	"Suffer the Masses"	6:05
7.	"6, Six, VI"	5:09
8.	"Greed"	4:24
9.	"E.M.T.E.K."	5:49
10.	"Scars"	4:14
11.	"K.A.B."	0:28

2008 Metal Mind re-release bonus track
No.	Title	Length
12.	"Interview from "The Master Sleeps" single"	25:14

== Credits ==
=== Band ===
- Eric A.K. - vocals
- Edward Carlson - guitars, backing vocals
- Michael Gilbert - guitars, backing vocals
- Troy Gregory - bass, backing vocals
- Kelly David-Smith - drums, backing vocals

=== Production ===
- Alex Perialas, Michael Rosen - producers, recording, engineering, mixing at Fantasy Studios, Berkeley
- Michael Semanicki, Rob "Wacko" Hunter, Tony Volante - engineering, recording
- Teresa Ensenat - A&R, direction
- Andy Somers - management
- Janie Hoffman - management
- T. Step - artwork (logo)
- Kosh/Dakos - artwork
- mastered at The Hit Factory, New York City
