= Back in Black (song) =

1980 single by AC/DC

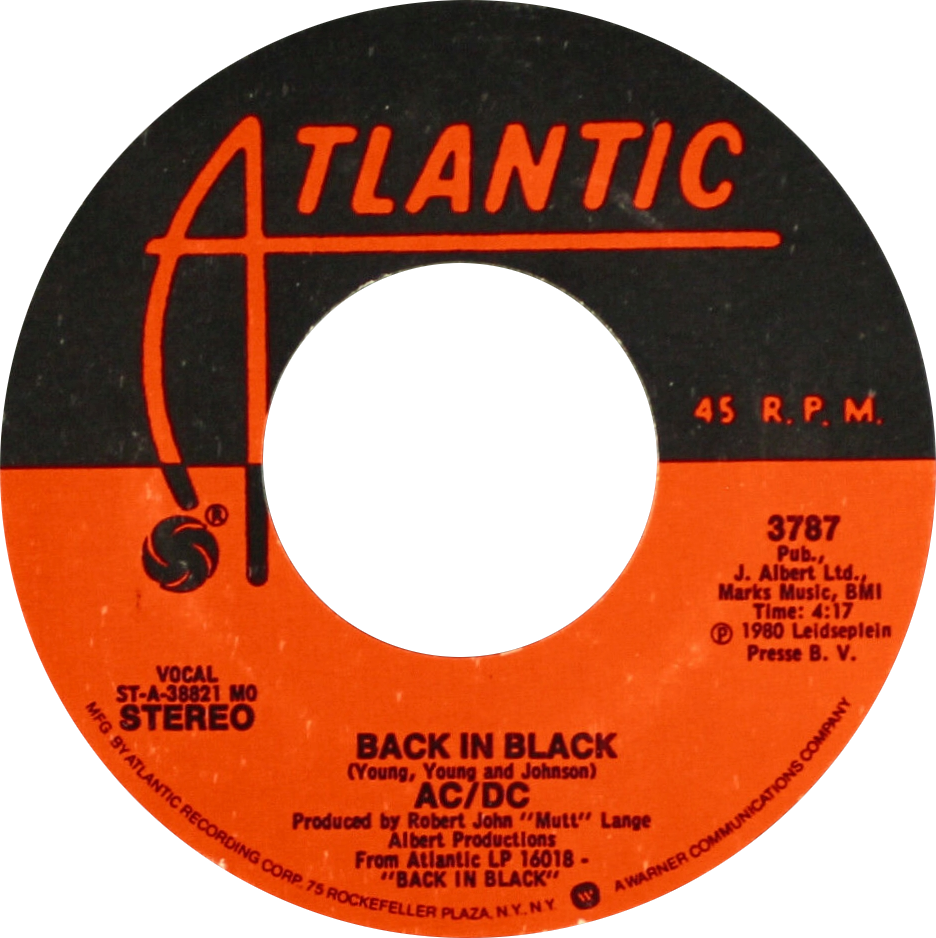
- One of side-A labels of US 7-inch single

Single by AC/DC

from the album Back in Black
- B-side: "What Do You Do for Money Honey"
- Released: December 1980 (US)
- Recorded: April – May 1980
- Studio: Compass Point (Nassau)
- Genre: Hard rock; heavy metal
- Length: 4:15
- Label: Atlantic
- Songwriters: Angus Young; Malcolm Young; Brian Johnson
- Producer: Robert John "Mutt" Lange

AC/DC singles chronology
"Rock and Roll Ain't Noise Pollution" (1980)	"Back in Black" (1980)	"Let's Get It Up" (1981)

Music video
- "Back In Black" on YouTube

"Back in Black" is a song by Australian rock band AC/DC. It was released as the second US single from their seventh album, also named Back in Black, and released in 1980 through Atlantic Records. Notable for its opening guitar riff, the song was written as a tribute to the band's former singer Bon Scott, who died suddenly in February 1980. In 1981, it reached number 37 on the Billboard Hot 100. In 2012, it reached number 65 in Australia and number 27 in the United Kingdom. It has been widely regarded as one of the best rock songs in history.

In January 2018, as part of Triple M's "Ozzest 100", which listed the "most Australian" songs, "Back in Black" was ranked number 22.

== Background ==
Known for its opening guitar riff, the song was AC/DC's tribute to their former singer Bon Scott. His replacement Brian Johnson recalled to Mojo magazine in 2009 that when the band asked him to write a lyric for this song, "they said, 'it can't be morbid – it has to be for Bon and it has to be a celebration.'" He added: "I thought, 'Well no pressure there, then' (laughs). I just wrote what came into my head, which at the time seemed like mumbo jumbo. 'Nine lives. Cats eyes. Abusing every one of them and running wild.' The boys got it though. They saw Bon's life in that lyric."

== Reception and impact ==
Opening guitar riff of "Back in Black"
The song's riff is one of the most recognised in hard rock history.

Record World said the song has "everything that's made the band one of the hottest sellers around: powerhouse rhythm grind, guitar raunch & vocal mania." In a retrospective piece on "Back in Black", Metal Hammer magazine hailed the song's riff as one of the greatest riffs ever and wrote, "There are rock songs that appeal to metal fans. And there are metal songs that appeal to rock fans. Then there is 'Back in Black' – a rock and metal song that appeals to everybody, from dads to dudes, to little old ladies beating noisy kids over the heads with their sticks – and it all hangs on that monumental, no-nonsense, three-chord monster of a riff." Will Byers from The Guardian said "AC/DC's judicious use of space" in the song helped make it a "classic metal anthem".

The song was ranked No. 4 by VH1 on their list of the 40 Greatest Metal Songs. In 2009, it was named the second-greatest hard rock song by VH1. The song was also ranked No. 187 on Rolling Stone's list of "500 Greatest Songs of All Time". The same magazine has also ranked the song No. 29 on their list of "The 100 Greatest Guitar Songs of All Time", and wrote of the song in an accompanying piece: "Angus and Malcolm Young's dual-guitar masterpiece is the platonic ideal of hard rock." In 2020, The Guardian ranked the song number three on their list of the 40 greatest AC/DC songs, and in 2021, Kerrang ranked the song number four on their list of the 20 greatest AC/DC songs.

In 2010, this song sat at No. 2 in Triple M Melbourne's Ultimate 500 Rock Countdown in Australia. The Top 5 were all AC/DC songs.

In 2023, Loudwire reported that the song's lyrics were among the most-searched in the rock genre from January 2019 through July 2023, according to an independent study of data pulled from Google Trends.

In 2025, it placed 37 in the Triple J Hottest 100 of Australian Songs.

== Commercial performance ==
As a single, "Back in Black" peaked in the U.S. at No. 37 on the Billboard Hot 100 chart in 1981 as well as at No. 51 on Billboard's Top Tracks chart, which debuted in March 1981. "Back in Black" received the RIAA's Master Ringtone Sales Award (Gold and Platinum) in 2006 and reached 2× Platinum status in 2007. It officially charted on the UK charts after 31 years in release; peaking in at no. 27 because of the band's music becoming available on iTunes. It also reached no. 1 on the UK Rock Charts in the same week.

== Personnel ==
AC/DC

- Brian Johnson – lead vocals
- Angus Young – lead guitar
- Malcolm Young – rhythm guitar, backing vocals
- Cliff Williams – bass guitar, backing vocals
- Phil Rudd – drums

Additional performer

- Robert John "Mutt" Lange – backing vocals

== Sampling ==
In 1984, the Beastie Boys sampled "Back in Black" without permission for their song "Rock Hard". In 1999, when they wished to include it on an upcoming CD compilation release, they sought permission but AC/DC refused. Mike D of the Beastie Boys quoted Malcolm Young's reason for refusing as: "'Nothing against you guys, but we just don't endorse sampling.'"

== Shakira version ==
"Back in Black"

Song by Shakira
- Released: 2004
- Recorded: 2003
- Genre: Hard rock
- Length: 5:23
- Label: Epic
- Songwriters: Brian Johnson; Angus Young; Malcolm Young
- Producers: Shakira; Tim Mitchell

Live video
- "Back in Black" on YouTube

Shakira performed a cover of "Back in Black" during her 2002-2003 Tour of the Mongoose, with the live performances of the song produced by Shakira and Tim Mitchell. A recording of the tour date on 22 April 2003 in Rotterdam, Netherlands, was released as a live album titled Live & off the Record in 2004.

== Covers and other versions ==
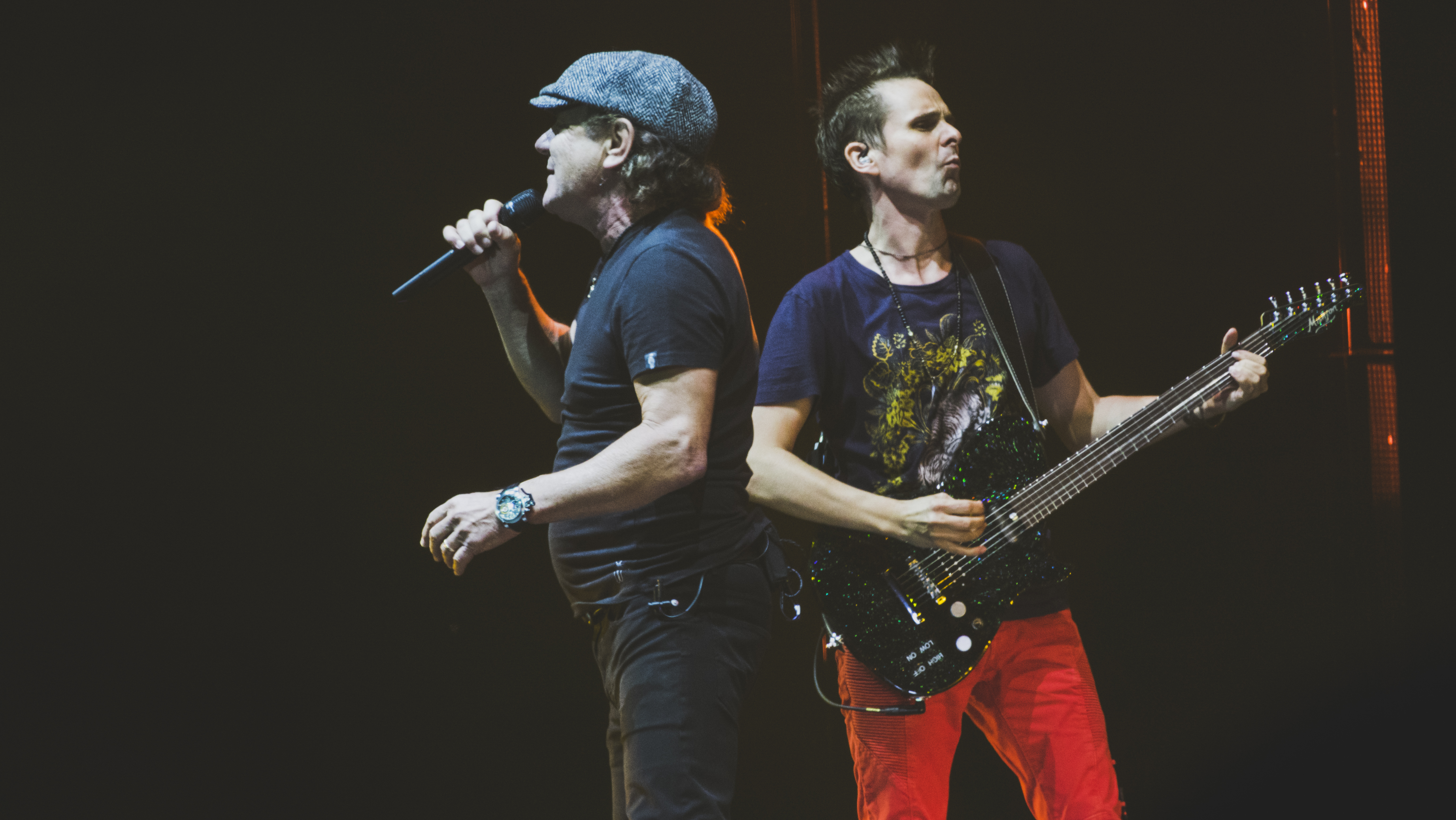
Brian Johnson performing "Back in Black" alongside Muse (guitarist Matt Bellamy pictured) at the 2017 Reading Festival

Two live versions of the song later appeared on both versions of the album Live, as well as the Australian tour edition of Stiff Upper Lip. It has been covered by a number of artists, including Living Colour and Shakira. In 2007, Troy "Trombone Shorty" Andrews & Orleans Avenue recorded live at the New Orleans Jazz & Heritage Festival. In 2017, Muse performed the song at the Reading Festival with Brian Johnson on vocals; this was Johnson's first performance in almost two years, as he was previously ordered to halt live performances in order to prevent further hearing damage.

Norwegian band Brothers recorded a version, which became one of the top-selling singles in Norway for 1993.

== In popular culture ==
"Back in Black" has been used in numerous films, television series, animated productions, and promotional trailers. Its appearances range from scenes in which the song is heard by the characters to montages and marketing campaigns that use the recording as background music.

In January 2018, the song was ranked number 22 on Triple M's "Ozzest 100", a countdown of the songs considered the "most Australian". The list was broadcast in connection with Australia Day and included several other songs by AC/DC, including "It's a Long Way to the Top (If You Wanna Rock 'n' Roll)" at number five and "Thunderstruck" at number eight.

=== Film and animation ===
The song was heard in Iron Man (2008), directed by Jon Favreau, who chose "Back in Black" to establish the film's attitude and rock-and-roll sensibility.

The recording also appears in Spider-Man: Far from Home (2019). The film's collection of licensed music includes "Back in Black" alongside recordings by other artists.

=== Television ===
The song later returned in the second-season episode "Bloodlust", which first aired in 2006. It accompanies a montage featuring a black Impala and the Winchester brothers travelling in the car.

== Charts ==
=== Weekly charts ===
Chart (1981)	Peak position
US Billboard Hot 100	37
US Billboard Mainstream Rock	51
US Cash Box Top 100	39

Chart (2012)	Peak position
Australia (ARIA)	65
France (SNEP)	58
Scottish Singles Sales (Official Charts)	28
South Korea (Gaon Karaoke International Chart)	65
UK Singles (Official Charts)	27
UK Rock & Metal (Official Charts Company)	1
US Digital Song Sales (Billboard)	20
US Hard Rock Digital Songs (Billboard)	1
US Hot 100 Recurrents (Billboard)	14

Chart (2015)	Peak position
Sweden (Sverigetopplistan)	100

Chart (2019)	Peak position
Hungary (Single Top 40)	29

Chart (2021)	Peak position
Global 200 (Billboard)	191

== Certifications ==
Region	Certification	Certified units/sales
Brazil (Pro-Música Brasil)	2× Platinum	120,000^{‡}
Canada (Music Canada)	9× Platinum	720,000^{‡}
Denmark (IFPI Danmark)	Platinum	90,000^{‡}
Germany (BVMI)	Platinum	500,000^{‡}
Italy (FIMI)	3× Platinum	300,000^{‡}
Mexico (AMPROFON)	2× Diamond+4× Platinum	840,000^{‡}
New Zealand (RMNZ)	5× Platinum	150,000^{‡}
Portugal (AFP)	2× Platinum	80,000^{‡}
Spain (Promusicae)	2× Platinum	120,000^{‡}
United Kingdom (BPI)	3× Platinum	1,800,000^{‡}
United States (RIAA)	7× Platinum	7,000,000^{‡}
Ringtone
Canada (Music Canada)	2× Platinum	80,000^{*}
United States (RIAA)	2× Platinum	2,000,000^{*}
^{*} Sales figures based on certification alone.^{‡} Sales+streaming figures based on certification alone.

== See also ==
- List of best-selling singles
