= Pure Chewing Satisfaction =

Album by Lard

Studio album by Lard
- Released: May 13, 1997
- Recorded: May 1990, 1991–1992, 1995–1997
- Studio: Chicago Trax
- Genre: Industrial metal
- Length: 37:26
- Label: Alternative Tentacles
- Producers: Hypo Luxa, Hermes Pan, Marshall Lawless

Lard chronology
The Last Temptation of Reid (1990)	Pure Chewing Satisfaction (1997)	70's Rock Must Die (2000)

Pure Chewing Satisfaction is the second studio album by American band Lard, released in 1997.

== Critical reception ==
Professional ratings
Review scores
Source	Rating
AllMusic	4/5 stars
Fort Worth Star-Telegram	3.5/5 stars
NME	8/10

The Fort Worth Star-Telegram wrote that "the sound may be a repetitive industrial/metal grind (think Ministry's 'Just One Fix' times eight) but Biafra's rants are full of vitriol and sharp imagery."

== Track listing ==
All songs written by Biafra/Jourgensen/Barker/Rieflin except as noted.

1. "War Pimp Renaissance" – 4:19
2. "I Wanna Be a Drug-Sniffing Dog" (Biafra, Jourgensen, Barker, Ward) – 3:17
3. "Moths" – 4:57
4. "Generation Execute" – 5:42
5. "Faith Hope and Treachery" – 3:56
6. "Peeling Back the Foreskin of Liberty" – 5:11
7. "Mangoat" (Biafra, Jourgensen, Barker, Scaccia, Svitek, Washam) – 5:05
8. "Sidewinder" – 4:59

== Personnel ==
Lard

- Rev. Al Jourgensen – guitars, keyboards, programming, production
- Rev. Paul Gordon Barker – bass, keys, programming, production
- Ayatollah Jello Biafra – "Mr. Microphone", photography, production
- William Rieflin – drums (1, 3–6, 8)

Additional personnel

- Jeff Ward – drums (2)
- Rey Washam – drums (7)
- Mike Scaccia – guitar (2–7)

== Charts ==
Chart performance for Pure Chewing Satisfaction
Chart (1997)	Peak position
Australian Albums (ARIA)	77
