= Flotsam and Jetsam (Flotsam and Jetsam album) =

Studio album by Flotsam and Jetsam
- Released: May 20, 2016
- Studio: Sonic Phish Productions and Gnome Lord Studios
- Genre: Thrash metal
- Length: 61:06
- Label: AFM

Flotsam and Jetsam chronology
Ugly Noise (2012)	Flotsam and Jetsam (2016)	The End of Chaos (2019)

Professional ratings
Review scores
Source	Rating
Sputnikmusic	3.8/5 stars

Flotsam and Jetsam is the twelfth studio album by the thrash metal band Flotsam and Jetsam, released on May 20, 2016. The song "Iron Maiden" is a tribute to the famous band. This is the only Flotsam and Jetsam album to feature drummer Jason Bittner, who left the band shortly after its release to join Overkill. The track "L.O.T.D." stands for "Legion of the Damned" and was originally written during the "No Place for Disgrace" sessions. "Forbidden Territories" was written by Mike Spencer when he was in Sentinel Beast (who also recorded a version in 2009), as well as a version re-worked by Sentinel Beast guitarist Barry Fischel and recorded by his band Fischel's Beast the same year.

== Reception ==
The Sonic Abuse website wrote: "A brutal, thrilling album from start to end, it sees the band demonstrating their versatility and power in equal measure and the results are nothing short of astounding." UK Metal Hammer, rated the album 3 out of 5. Jason Arnopp wrote: "For some reason, Eric AK doesn’t always employ the classic tone that makes his voice unique, but whenever it does return the material feels more distinctive." German Metal Hammer rated the album 4 out of 5, Katrin Riedl wrote that the self entitled album marks a "new beginning" for the band. Sputnik Music wrote the self-titled album "brings back the 80s thrash vibe in a way that even the band’s No Place for Disgrace re-recording couldn’t pull off, and it blends it with the modern moody aggression of The Cold. This blend easily places it in the top 5 of Flotsam and Jetsam’s discography."

== Track listing ==
No.	Title	Length
1.	"Seventh Seal"	5:50
2.	"Life Is a Mess"	4:20
3.	"Taser"	4:11
4.	"Iron Maiden"	3:40
5.	"Verge of Tragedy"	5:19
6.	"Creeper"	5:33
7.	"L.O.T.D."	4:47
8.	"The Incantation" (Instrumental)	1:38
9.	"Monkey Wrench"	4:15
10.	"Time to Go"	4:19
11.	"Smoking Gun"	4:55
12.	"Forbidden Territories"	6:44

Japanese bonus track
No.	Title	Length
13.	"Once in a Time" (Japanese bonus track)	5:35

== Personnel ==
- Eric A. "A.K." Knutson — vocals
- Steve Conley — guitar
- Michael Gilbert — guitar
- Michael Spencer — bass
- Jason Bittner — drums

== Charts ==
Chart (2016)	Peak position
German Albums (Offizielle Top 100)	46
