= Flotsam and Jetsam (band) =

American thrash metal band

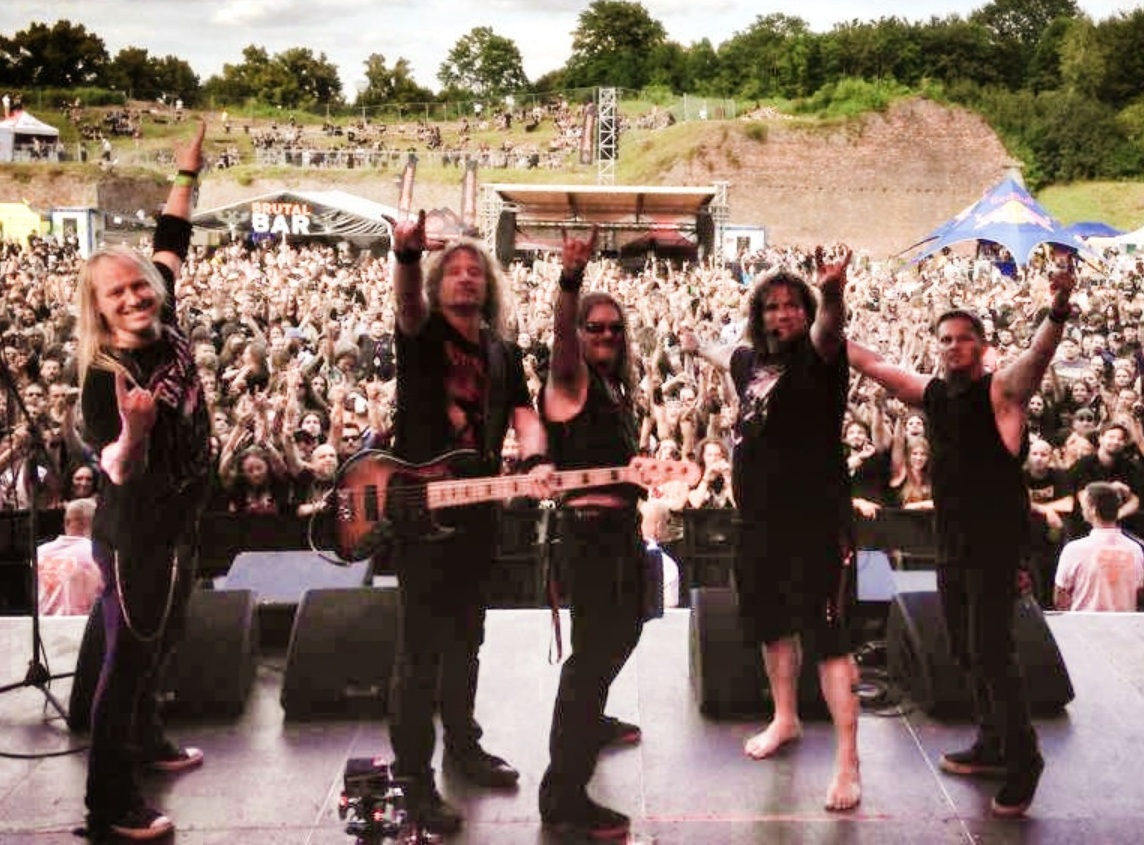
- Flotsam and Jetsam at the 2014 Brutal Assault Festival

Background information
- Also known as: Paradox (1981–1982); Dredlox (1982–1983); Dogz (1983–1984)
- Origin: Phoenix, Arizona, U.S.
- Genre: Thrash metal
- Years active: 1981–present
- Labels: Driven Music Group; Metal Blade; Elektra; MCA; Crash Music; AFM; Napalm
- Members: Eric "A.K." Knutson; Michael Gilbert; Steve Conley; Ken Mary; Bill Bodily
- Past members: Mark Vazquez; Kevin Horton; Donnie "Ho" Crist; Jason Newsted; Phil Rind; Troy Gregory; Jason Ward; Craig Nielsen; Mark Simpson; Edward Carlson; Kelly David-Smith; Jason Bittner; Michael Spencer
- Website: www.flotstildeath.com

Flotsam and Jetsam is an American thrash metal band that was formed in Phoenix, Arizona, in 1981. Before settling on its name in 1984, the band was known as Paradox, Dredlox and The Dogz. Their latest lineup includes vocalist Eric "A.K" Knutson, guitarists Michael Gilbert and Steve Conley, bassist Bill Bodily, and drummer Ken Mary. Flotsam and Jetsam went through several lineup changes over the years, leaving Knutson as the only constant member. They featured a then-unknown Jason Newsted as their bassist from 1981 to 1986, when he left the band shortly after the release of their debut album to join Metallica.

Flotsam and Jetsam has released sixteen studio albums, the most recent being 2026's Rats in the Temple. The band emerged as part of the second wave of thrash metal during the mid-to-late 1980s, along with Sepultura, Testament and Death Angel, and achieved moderate success with the albums No Place for Disgrace (1988), When the Storm Comes Down (1990) and Cuatro (1992), with the first two entering the Billboard 200 chart and the latter cracking the top 30 on the Heatseekers chart.

== History ==
=== 1981–1986: Early days ===
The group was founded in 1981 under the name Paradox by drummer Kelly David-Smith and guitarists Pete Mello and Dave Goulder, who were later joined by bassist Jason Newsted. Newsted had answered an advertisement that David-Smith had placed in the local newspaper, looking for a bass player. Newsted came to Phoenix with his band Gangster, from Michigan, on their way to California, but Gangster broke up while in Phoenix. David-Smith got a call from a couple of his high school friends, Mark Vasquez and Kevin Horton, looking for some people to jam with playing covers of bands such as Iron Maiden, Judas Priest, MSG, and UFO. The band then morphed into Dredlox together with the new recruits, and Newsted was now the main vocalist.

David-Smith saw "A.K." (Eric A. Knutson) singing "The Goodbye Girl" at his high school talent show. In 1982, they were in the same summer school class and David-Smith asked Knutson if he wanted to audition. They put him on two-week probation and he later joined the band. Due to the provisional nature of his membership, the band referred to Knutson as "the 2 weeker". Ed Carlson, from another local rival band called Exodus (not to be confused with the San Francisco Bay Area thrash metal band of the same name), also joined in 1983, after Horton's departure from the band. The name of the band changed into The Dogz, but it did not last long. Eventually the band renamed itself "Flotsam and Jetsam", after writing a song inspired by a chapter (Book III, chapter 9) from J. R. R. Tolkien's The Lord of the Rings, which bore the same name.

The band made its live debut in local clubs and in California and had the opportunity to play with bands such as Megadeth, Armored Saint, Alcatrazz, Malice, Exciter, Mercyful Fate, Riot, Autograph and Icon. In 1985, Mark Vasquez stepped out and then-17-year-old Michael Gilbert joined the band. Flotsam and Jetsam released two demo tapes Iron Tears and Metal Shock that same year.

They created their first video "Hammerhead" from the Metal Shock demo: "We taped it in Jason and Ed's apartment living room. We also made a live video at the infamous Bootlegger in Phoenix" (owned by Gloria Cavalera, currently married to Max Cavalera). These videos and the band's demos made a good impression on record labels. After the band contributed to the Speed Metal Hell II and Metal Massacre VII compilations, they then signed a deal with Metal Blade Records.

=== 1986–1989: Doomsday for the Deceiver and No Place for Disgrace ===
Flotsam and Jetsam recorded their debut album Doomsday for the Deceiver in Los Angeles, with producer Brian Slagel and engineer Bill Metoyer. The album was released on July 4, 1986, and was the first in Kerrang!'s history to achieve the 6K rating.

Newsted, who was also the band's main lyric writer, departed soon after to join Metallica, replacing their bassist Cliff Burton, who died in a bus accident. On Halloween night 1986, he played his last show with Flotsam and Jetsam. The band had asked another local bassist Phil Rind of Sacred Reich to fill in for a short time. They then hired Michael Spencer from the Sacramento band Sentinel Beast. Flotsam and Jetsam signed a deal with Metallica's then-label Elektra Records before opening for Megadeth in 1987 on the Peace Sells tour in Europe and North America. After touring with Megadeth, the band played selected shows in America with Slayer, Dark Angel, Possessed, Celtic Frost, Sacred Reich and Excel.

Spencer left Flotsam and Jetsam shortly after a U.S. tour in the fall of 1987; his replacement was Troy Gregory. Their second studio album, No Place for Disgrace, was released in May 1988, and includes a cover of Elton John's hit "Saturday Night's Alright for Fighting", for which a music video was shot. The band toured heavily behind No Place for Disgrace throughout 1988 and 1989. They opened for King Diamond in North America, and supported Megadeth, Testament and Sanctuary in Europe on the So Far, So Good... So What! tour. The band also toured or played shows with Testament, The Crumbsuckers, Fates Warning, Destruction, Metal Church, Death Angel, D.R.I., Acid Reign and Kreator, and landed a billing for festivals, such as Milwaukee Metalfest, and played at Aardschokdag twice (in May 1988 and April 1989).

=== 1989–1995: MCA era ===
In 1989, Flotsam and Jetsam were signed to MCA Records and began work on their third album When the Storm Comes Down, which was released in May 1990. The band expected to gain recognition with this album, but it suffered from a variety of mixed reviews. A video made for "Suffer the Masses" did however receive heavy rotation on MTV's Headbangers Ball. Musically and lyrically, When the Storm Comes Down marked the beginning of at least two changes for Flotsam and Jetsam: it mirrored much of the occult and dark themes evidenced in the lyrical content of their previous two albums, instead focusing on politics and society in general, and saw the band expanding their thrash roots and using elements of the progressive and technical style of their later albums. The band toured for about a year and a half in support of When the Storm Comes Down; they co-headlined a U.S. tour with Prong, and subsequently toured or played selected shows with bands such as Testament, Savatage, Exodus, Vio-Lence, Sacred Reich, Wrathchild America and then-unknown Pantera.

Shortly after the When the Storm Comes Down tour ended, bassist Troy Gregory departed to join Prong. Holding auditions in Phoenix, the band hired Jason Ward to fill the role. With Ward as their new bassist, Flotsam and Jetsam released their fourth album Cuatro in October 1992. It marked an evolution in style and songwriting, moving from thrash to a slower, slightly more, melodic sound, while also continuing the progressive and technical song structures used on When the Storm Comes Down. The band released four singles this time, two of which ("Swatting at Flies" and "Wading Through the Darkness") were shot as music videos and both received regular rotation on Headbangers Ball. Flotsam and Jetsam promoted Cuatro with a year-long tour, playing with bands like Body Count, Sepultura, Testament, White Zombie, Nudeswirl and Damn the Machine, as well as doing a US tour with Mercyful Fate, Cathedral and Anacrusis.

Slowing down after the moderate success of their previous albums, it took nearly three years until Flotsam and Jetsam released their fifth album Drift in April 1995, which was dedicated to Jason's older brother Jeff Ward, former drummer of such bands as Nine Inch Nails, Ministry, Revolting Cocks and Lard, who died in 1993. Three singles were released off of the record, and one of them ("Smoked Out") had a music video. However, with Headbangers Ball already off the air in the U.S., and many heavy metal radio stations changing formats, Drift did not sell as well as the band's previous albums, and about the same time they toured the U.S. with Megadeth and Korn during the summer of 1995, MCA's six-year relationship with Flotsam and Jetsam had ended.

=== 1996–2001: Return to Metal Blade ===
After taking a break in most of 1996 and resigning from MCA to Metal Blade, Flotsam and Jetsam resurfaced in 1997 with their sixth album High. The album's song titles were designed with the font types/logos of famous bands like Iron Maiden, Metallica, Kiss, Van Halen, AC/DC, Judas Priest, Misfits, etc. to pay homage to those whom came before and inspired the band while it was coming up the ranks. The music was more experimental than before, and the album also featured the Lard cover song Fork Boy. Music video was released, Monster to follow-up.

Michael Gilbert and Kelly Smith left the band after the release and were replaced by guitarist Mark Simpson and drummer Craig Nielsen (at the suggestion of then-Megadeth drummer Nick Menza). With the new line-up Flotsam and Jetsam toured in Europe together with Anvil and Exciter.

Unnatural Selection was released in 1999 and Mark Simpson took a short break. He joined the band again in 2000 to record a new album, My God released in May 2001. At that time Eric A.K. had founded a country band, the A.K. Corral. He left the band for a short time to take a break from Metal and pursue his side project. (AK) "I had given Metal my life for a solid 15 years, I took some time to explore other musical flavors". Though Flotsam and Jetsam did not disband, there was a long break at that time. They found a new singer, James Rivera, who took over vocal duties live. Later the band felt that no one other than Eric A.K. could be their singer and Rivera left the band soon after.

=== 2002–2010: Live in Phoenix, Dreams of Death and The Cold ===
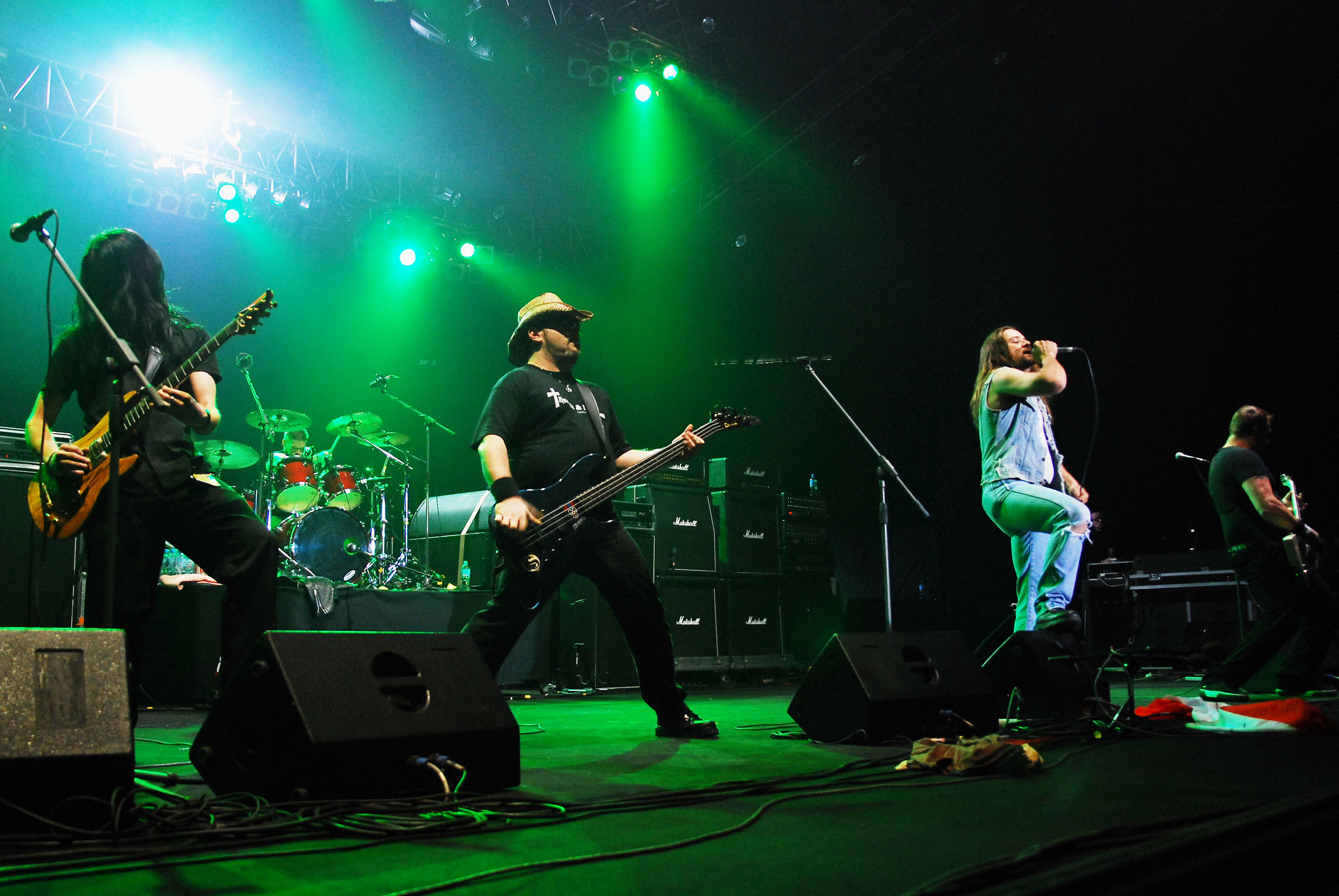
Flotsam and Jetsam at Metalmania 2008

During 2002 and 2003, the band were active only sporadically, but Eric A.K. rejoined for live dates in the Phoenix and Los Angeles areas in 2003. Tory Edwards was a guest for this tour. A live recording of these shows was released in 2004 as a live concert DVD under the title Live in Phoenix. Signed to the Crash Music label in May 2004 and with Eric A.K. joining the band again officially, they hit the road with Overkill and Death Angel for a series of sold-out concerts in Japan.

In the spring of 2005, Flotsam and Jetsam returned to the studio to work on their new album. The lyrics were mostly inspired by Eric's nightmares. This resulted into a concept album entitled Dreams of Death – like track 2 of No Place for Disgrace. The album was released July 2005.

The live DVD Live in Japan was released in February 2006 and shows their concert in front of hundreds of screaming Japanese fans at the Citta Club in Tokyo 2004.

Doomsday for the Deceiver was re-released in November 2006 by Metal Blade Records to celebrate the album's twentieth anniversary. This set (two CDs and one DVD) includes the original recording of Doomsday and a re-mixed and re-mastered (digitized) version and also the two Flotsam and Jetsam demos. The bonus DVD includes rare live material, an interview filmed at David-Smith's High School and a photo slide-show.

In March 2008, Flotsam and Jetsam toured in Europe and played at the Metalmania Festival in Poland. This show was filmed and released as DVD Once in a Deathtime in July. In mid-2008 the band were signed to Driven Music Group, founded by former KORN guitarist Brian "Head" Welch.

After a tour in Europe with support act Neurasthenia in April 2010 Flotsam and Jetsam finished their album The Cold. It was released on September 14, 2010. It was the last album with Mark Simpson on guitar. He left the band in friendship and was replaced by returning guitarist Ed Carlson, who had quit the band in March 2010, to be replaced by Michael Gilbert.

=== 2011–2013: Ugly Noise ===
On September 19, 2011, Flotsam and Jetsam announced they had parted ways with Craig Nielson and reunited with founding drummer David-Smith. The band also announced a crowdfunding campaign on PledgeMusic to fund the recording of their next studio album.

On June 13, 2012, the band announced Ugly Noise as the title of the next album. In July, guitarist Michael Gilbert said the album would feature songwriting contributions from former bassist Jason Newsted. The album was released on December 21, 2012.

After tracking, Jason Ward was no longer able to commit to touring with the band any further due to his current personal commitments. He was replaced by Michael Spencer, who had previously replaced Newsted in 1986.

During the tour, Edward Carlson started to have extreme physical pain in his lower back and numbness in his right arm. After the tour, an MRI revealed that he had bulging disks in his upper and lower back causing the dysfunction to occur. Flotsam and Jetsam then recruited guitarist Steve Conley of F5 to step in while they finished out their live commitments.

=== 2013–2014: No Place For Disgrace 2014 ===
No Place For Disgrace 2014 featured guest musicians Mark Simpson, Chris Poland and Tory Edwards. In June 2013, the band headlined at the Warriors of Metal Festival in Columbus, Ohio.

Flotsam and Jetsam embarked on a 29-date European tour with Sepultura, Legion of the Damned and Mortillery. The tour kicked off on February 7, 2014, in Bochum, Germany.

The band toured Europe four times in 2014 with a total of 40 shows in all. Returning home from Europe on August 11, the band planned to start writing for a new release in 2015. Michael Spencer and Steve Conley would be involved this time in the process. Spencer had written some material previously in 1987 that he took with him after his departure. Flotsam used some of the archive material from Spencer.

=== 2014–2021: Flotsam and Jetsam, The End of Chaos and Blood in the Water ===
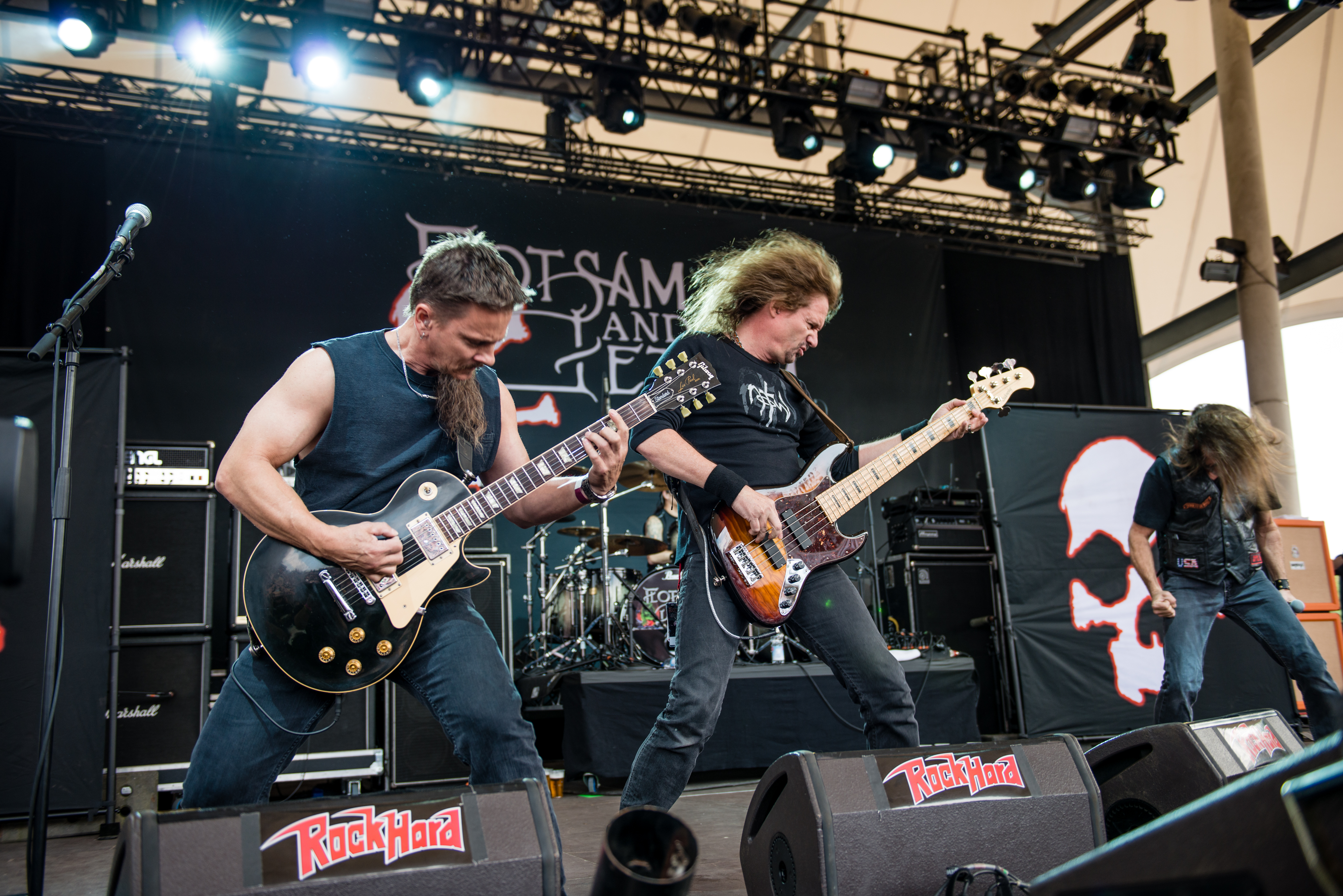
Flotsam and Jetsam performing in Germany in 2015

In December 2014, drummer and founding member, David-Smith decided to leave the band due to unexpected family matters that required him to be home with his family. Handpicked by Smith to replace him on drums, was longtime friend and Shadows Fall drummer Jason Bittner. Bittner was present on Flotsam and Jetsam's self-titled twelfth studio album, which was released on May 20, 2016. The band did a world tour to support this album, including Europe with Destruction, Enforcer and Nervosa, North America with Helstar and Hatchet, and then back to Europe with Dew-Scented and Izegrim. They also opened for HammerFall on their spring/summer 2018 North American tour.

On July 6, 2017, it was announced that Flotsam and Jetsam were replacing Bittner (who had just joined Overkill) with Ken Mary (Fifth Angel, Alice Cooper, House of Lords, TKO, Chastain, Impellitteri), and that they had begun working on their thirteenth studio album The End of Chaos, which was initially reported to be released in November 2018; however, the album's release date was pushed back to January 18, 2019. In support of The End of Chaos, Flotsam and Jetsam (along with Destruction and Meshiaak) opened for Overkill on the European Killfest Tour in March 2019. A headlining US tour, titled Demolition of North America, was scheduled to take place in the spring of 2020, but it was postponed and then cancelled, due to the COVID-19 pandemic.

Less than a month after the release of The End of Chaos, frontman Eric "A.K." Knutson stated in an interview with Jesse Capps of Loudist that Flotsam and Jetsam would "probably start writing and recording" a follow-up album in November 2019.

On November 13, 2020, the band announced Bill Bodily had replaced Michael Spencer as their new bassist, and that the final mixes for their upcoming album were almost finished.

On April 1, 2021, Flotsam and Jetsam announced Blood in the Water as the title of their fourteenth studio album and June 4 as its release date. A week later, the band released a music video for the album's first single, "Burn the Sky". Flotsam and Jetsam promoted Blood in the Water with a headlining US tour, and they were slated to open for Accept on the European trek of their Too Mean to Die tour in January and February 2022 (along with Phil Campbell and the Bastard Sons), but "many factors" prompted the band to withdraw from the tour. Flotsam and Jetsam did, however, tour Europe in June 2022 as a headlining act.

=== 2021–present: I Am the Weapon and Rats in the Temple ===
In an interview with AZ Central on June 5, 2021, the day after the release of Blood in the Water, frontman Eric "A.K." Knutson mentioned a follow-up album, revealing that he "probably [had] enough songs that didn't make it on the last two records to do two more records".

On April 26, 2024, Flotsam and Jetsam released "I Am the Weapon" as the first single from their upcoming fifteenth studio album of the same name. On May 31, 2024, a music video for the album's second single "Primal" was released, and on the same day, the band announced that I Am the Weapon would be released on September 13.

On September 29, 2025, it was announced that Flotsam and Jetsam had signed to Napalm Records and would release their next album in 2026. The resulting album, Rats in the Temple, was released on August 28, 2026.

== Musical style ==
Flotsam and Jetsam play speed metal. AllMusic noted the band's rhythm section for sounding "particularly heavy".

== Band members ==
Current

- Eric "A. K." Knutson — lead vocals (1982–2001, 2003–present)
- Michael Gilbert — guitar, backing vocals (1985–1997, 1999–2000, 2010–present)
- Steve Conley — guitar, backing vocals (2013–present)
- Ken Mary — drums (2017–present)
- Bill Bodily — bass, backing vocals (2020–present; touring 2016, 2019)

== Discography ==
=== Studio albums ===
- Doomsday for the Deceiver (1986)
- No Place for Disgrace (1988)
- When the Storm Comes Down (1990)
- Cuatro (1992)
- Drift (1995)
- High (1997)
- Unnatural Selection (1999)
- My God (2001)
- Dreams of Death (2005)
- The Cold (2010)
- Ugly Noise (2012)
- Flotsam and Jetsam (2016)
- The End of Chaos (2019)
- Blood in the Water (2021)
- I Am the Weapon (2024)
- Rats in the Temple (2026)

=== Live albums ===
- Live in Phoenix (2005)
- Once in a Deathtime (2008)

=== Singles/EPs ===
- "Flotzilla" (1987)
- "Saturday Night's Alright for Fighting" (1988)
- "Suffer the Masses" (1990)
- "The Master Sleeps" (1990)
- "Selections from Cuatro"/"Never to Reveal" (1992)
- "Swatting at Flies" (1992)
- "Wading Through the Darkness" (1992)
- "Cradle Me Now" (1992)
- "Smoked Out" (1995)
- "Blindside" (1995)
- "Destructive Signs" (1995)
- "Life, Love, Death" (2019)

=== DVDs ===
- Live in Phoenix (2004)
- Live in Japan (2006)
- Once in a Deathtime (2008)
