= Blood in the Water (album) =

Studio album by Flotsam and Jetsam
- Released: June 4, 2021
- Recorded: 2020
- Genre: Thrash metal
- Length: 53:29
- Label: AFM

Flotsam and Jetsam chronology
The End of Chaos (2019)	Blood in the Water (2021)	I Am the Weapon (2024)

Singles from Blood in the Water
- 1. "Burn the Sky" Released: April 9, 2021; 2. "Blood in the Water" Released: April 30, 2021; 3. "Brace for Impact" Released: May 25, 2021

Blood in the Water is the fourteenth studio album by American thrash metal band Flotsam and Jetsam, which was released on June 4, 2021. It is the band's first release with new bassist Bill Bodily, who had replaced Michael Spencer in November 2020.

== Track listing ==
No.	Title	Length
1.	"Blood in the Water"	4:17
2.	"Burn the Sky"	4:26
3.	"Brace for Impact"	4:33
4.	"A Place to Die"	4:22
5.	"The Walls"	4:41
6.	"Cry for the Dead"	4:36
7.	"The Wicked Hour"	4:56
8.	"Too Many Lives"	4:49
9.	"Grey Dragon"	4:27
10.	"Reaggression"	4:10
11.	"Undone"	3:19
12.	"Seven Seconds 'til the End of the World"	4:53
Total length:		53:29

== Personnel ==
- Eric "A.K." Knutson – vocals
- Michael Gilbert – guitars
- Bill Bodily – bass
- Steve Conley – guitars
- Ken Mary – drums

== Charts ==
Chart performance for Blood in the Water
Chart (2021)	Peak position
Austrian Albums (Ö3 Austria)	61
Belgian Albums (Ultratop Flanders)	153
Dutch Albums (Album Top 100)	100
German Albums (Offizielle Top 100)	9
Swiss Albums (Schweizer Hitparade)	30
