= Dreams of Death =

Studio album by Flotsam and Jetsam
- Released: July 26, 2005
- Genre: Thrash metal; progressive metal
- Length: 47:20
- Label: Crash Music
- Producer: Tom Giatron and Mark Simpson

Flotsam and Jetsam chronology
My God (2001)	Dreams of Death (2005)	The Cold (2010)

Professional ratings
Review scores
Source	Rating
Allmusic	3/5 stars
Blabbermouth	7.5/10 stars

Dreams of Death is the ninth studio album by the thrash metal band Flotsam and Jetsam. It was released on 26 July 2005.

This album marked another departure from Flotsam and Jetsam's previous works and strict thrash metal approach. Similar to the 1995 Drift album, the band incorporated some new elements of ballad songwriting, acoustic, progressive metal and death metal. Dreams Of Death a concept album revolving around the theme of death-related nightmares. It is a continuation of the song themes in Dreams Of Death, previously recorded on the 1988 album No Place For Disgrace.

== Track listing ==
All tracks by Flotsam and Jetsam

No.	Title	Length
1.	"Requiescal" (Instrumental)	0:36
2.	"Straight To Hell"	4:30
3.	"Parapsychic, Paranoid"	2:52
4.	"Bleed"	5:19
5.	"Look In His Eyes"	4:24
6.	"Childhood Hero"	6:26
7.	"Bathing In Red"	6:20
8.	"Nascentes Morimar" (Instrumental)	5:02
9.	"Out Of Mind"	11:51

Hidden track

- The final song of the album, "Out of Mind" contains a hidden song after. After the central part of the track ends at 4:53 and after 1:30 of silence an alternate acoustic version of the track "Bathing In Red" plays for 5:27.

== Personnel ==
- Edward Carlson – guitars
- Eric A.K. – vocals
- Jason Ward – bass guitar
- Craig Nielsen – drums
- Mark Simpson – guitars
