= No Place for Disgrace =

1988 album by Flotsam and Jetsam

Studio album by Flotsam and Jetsam
- Released: May 20, 1988
- Recorded: December 1987–February 1988
- Studios: Music Grinder Studios and Track Records, Los Angeles; Pacific Sound Studios, Chatsworth, California; Preferred Sound Studios, Woodland Hills, California
- Genres: Thrash metal; speed metal
- Length: 54:29
- Labels: Metal Blade; Elektra
- Producers: Bill Metoyer; Flotsam and Jetsam

Flotsam and Jetsam chronology
| Doomsday for the Deceiver (1986) | No Place for Disgrace (1988) | When the Storm Comes Down (1990) |

No Place for Disgrace is the second album by American thrash metal band Flotsam and Jetsam, released in 1988. This marked the band's first album release through a major label, Elektra Records, and was also their first album with the bass guitarist Troy Gregory, who had replaced Jason Newsted when the latter left the band in 1986 to join Metallica. Newsted received co-writing credits on three songs.

== Overview ==
No Place for Disgrace is thematically much darker than Doomsday for the Deceiver, and while some of the band's subsequent albums have a more political edge, the lyrical content of the album was similar to its predecessor, focusing on themes centered around history and literature, as well as Satanism and the occult. No Place for Disgrace also received some notice for its cover of an Elton John song, "Saturday Night's Alright for Fighting", and upon its release charted on Billboard at 143.

According to former Flotsam and Jetsam bassist Michael Spencer, who briefly replaced Newsted, Flotsam and Jetsam's then-A&R rep Michael Alago, wanted the album to be called Blessing in Disguise. However, when Spencer left the band just prior to the recording sessions, Flotsam and Jetsam went with their own choice, and Metal Church (who was also on Elektra at the time) ended up with Blessing in Disguise as the title of their third album, which was released about nine months after No Place for Disgrace. In an April 2013 interview however, drummer Kelly David-Smith disputed Spencer's claims, saying, "No Place for Disgrace was always going to be called No Place for Disgrace. Actually, we did record a song called 'Blessing in Disguise' which was on a demo version of the album. I think about 100 copies of it were sold. I've looked on eBay and they're really hot property!"

== Reception ==
AllMusic gave the album four stars, commenting that it "basically repeats the formula of their debut but benefits from a cleaner yet still-in-your face production job. " A staff member for About.com praised the album in a 2011 review, citing the song "N.E. Terror" as a highlight, as it was "packed with jaw-dropping trade-off guitar solos, including a lead bass break that would make Newsted proud." Adam McCann of Metal Digest wrote, "By 1988, Flotsam and Jetsam had not only found cult fame with their stunning debut album Doomsday for the Deceiver, but they were attracting attention from the mainstream by being the band from which Metallica plucked their bass player in the shape of Jason Newsted. Yet, unlike their debut album, No Place... was somewhat darker than its predecessor minus the well-received cover of Elton John's 'Saturday Night's Alright For Fighting', this was an album which focused very much the occult and history and it showed that there was life after Newsted."

== Track listing ==
| No. | Title | Writer(s) | Length |
|---|---|---|---|
| 1. | "No Place for Disgrace" | Michael Gilbert, Jason Newsted, Kelly Smith, Eric AK Knutson, Ed Carlson | 6:13 |
| 2. | "Dreams of Death" | Gilbert, Smith, Knutson, Carlson, Michael Spencer | 5:39 |
| 3. | "N.E. Terror" | Gilbert, Newsted, Eric Braverman, Smith, Knutson, Carlson | 5:57 |
| 4. | "Escape from Within" | Gilbert, Braverman, Smith, Knutson, Carlson, Spencer | 6:47 |
| 5. | "Saturday Night's Alright for Fighting" (Elton John cover) | Elton John, Bernie Taupin | 3:52 |
| 6. | "Hard on You" | Gilbert, Smith, Knutson, Carlson, Spencer | 4:50 |
| 7. | "I Live You Die" | Gilbert, Newsted, Smith, Knutson, Carlson | 5:49 |
| 8. | "Misguided Fortune" | Gilbert, Smith, Troy Gregory, Knutson, Carlson | 5:41 |
| 9. | "P.A.A.B." | Gilbert, Braverman, Smith, Knutson, Carlson | 5:32 |
| 10. | "The Jones" (Instrumental) | Gilbert, Smith, Knutson, Carlson | 4:07 |

== Credits ==
=== Band ===
- Eric A.K. – vocals
- Michael Gilbert – guitars
- Edward Carlson – guitars
- Troy Gregory – bass
- Kelly David-Smith – drums

=== Production ===
- Bill Metoyer – producer, engineering
- Flotsam and Jetsam – producer
- Michael Wagener – mixing at Enterprise Studios, Burbank, Los Angeles
- Brian Carlstrom, Leon Johnsonn, Ken Paulakovich, Pete Magdaleno, Matt Freeman, Scott Campbell – assistant engineers
- Mastered by George Marino at Sterling Sound Studios
- Boris Vallejo – illustration
- Dan Altwies, Kelly Smith – cover design
- Keith Rawls, Bill Calderwood – management

== No Place for Disgrace 2014 ==
No Place for Disgrace

Studio album of re-recorded songs by Flotsam and Jetsam
- Released: February 14, 2014
- Genres: Thrash metal; speed metal
- Length: 59:10
- Label: Metal Blade
- Producers: Michael Gilbert; Flotsam and Jetsam

Flotsam and Jetsam chronology
| Ugly Noise (2012) | No Place for Disgrace (2014) | Flotsam and Jetsam (2016) |

No Place for Disgrace 2014 is the re-recorded album by American thrash metal band Flotsam and Jetsam, released on February 14, 2014, with Tory Edwards on violin and mandolin. The band stated that they had received many requests to remix the record and had experienced difficulties in obtaining the master tapes of the 1988 album and as such, decided to re-record the album. Of the decision, the band commented that "The aim was not really to change but to enhance it with the opportunity with the use of new tools. We have the time available as well, and it just seemed like a no-brainer."

== Credits ==
- Eric A.K. – vocals
- Steve Conley – guitars
- Michael Gilbert – guitars
- Mike Spencer – bass guitar
- Kelly David-Smith – drums
- Tory Edwards – Violin and mandolin
