= The End of Chaos =

Studio album by Flotsam and Jetsam
- Released: January 18, 2019
- Recorded: 2018
- Genre: Thrash metal
- Length: 49:20
- Label: AFM

Flotsam and Jetsam chronology
Flotsam and Jetsam (2016)	The End of Chaos (2019)	Blood in the Water (2021)

Singles from The End of Chaos
- 1. "Recover" Released: November 2, 2018; 2. "Demolition Man" Released: November 23, 2018; 3. "Control" Released: January 18, 2019

The End of Chaos is the thirteenth studio album by American thrash metal band Flotsam and Jetsam, released on January 18, 2019. It was their first album to feature drummer Ken Mary (replacing Jason Bittner, who left Flotsam and Jetsam in 2017 to join Overkill), and the last to include bassist Michael Spencer before his split from the band in 2020.

== Track listing ==
No.	Title	Length
1.	"Prisoner of Time"	4:17
2.	"Control"	3:45
3.	"Recover"	4:08
4.	"Prepare for Chaos"	3:45
5.	"Slowly Insane"	3:53
6.	"Architects of Hate"	5:04
7.	"Demolition Man"	3:37
8.	"Unwelcome Surprise"	5:07
9.	"Snake Eye"	3:54
10.	"Survive"	4:08
11.	"Good or Bad"	3:55
12.	"The End"	3:47
Total length:		49:20

Japan bonus track
No.	Title	Length
13.	"Another One"	4:12
Total length:		53:39

== Personnel ==
- Eric "A.K." Knutson – vocals
- Michael Gilbert – guitars
- Michael Spencer – bass
- Steve Conley – guitars
- Ken Mary – drums

== Charts ==
Chart (2019)	Peak position
German Albums (Offizielle Top 100)	19
Swiss Albums (Schweizer Hitparade)	57
