= I Am the Weapon (album) =

Studio album by Flotsam and Jetsam
- Released: September 13, 2024
- Recorded: 2023–2024
- Length: 47:16
- Label: AFM

Flotsam and Jetsam chronology
Blood in the Water (2021)	I Am the Weapon (2024)	Rats in the Temple (2026)

Singles from I Am the Weapon
- 1. "I Am the Weapon" Released: April 26, 2024; 2. "Primal" Released: May 31, 2024; 3. "Burned My Bridges" Released: July 5, 2024; 4. "A New Kind of Hero" Released: August 2, 2024

I Am the Weapon is the fifteenth studio album by American thrash metal band Flotsam and Jetsam, released on September 13, 2024. This album marked the first time since 2010's The Cold that the band recorded more than one album with the same lineup.

== Track listing ==
No.	Title	Length
1.	"A New Kind of Hero"	4:50
2.	"Primal"	3:53
3.	"I Am the Weapon"	3:17
4.	"Burned My Bridges"	4:14
5.	"The Head of the Snake"	4:41
6.	"Beneath the Shadows"	4:15
7.	"Gates of Hell"	3:58
8.	"Cold Steel Lights"	3:55
9.	"Kings of the Underworld"	4:01
10.	"Running Through the Fire"	4:53
11.	"Black Wings"	5:19
Total length:		47:16

== Personnel ==
- Eric "A.K." Knutson – vocals
- Michael Gilbert – guitars
- Bill Bodily – bass
- Steve Conley – guitars
- Ken Mary – drums

== Charts ==
Chart performance for I Am the Weapon
Chart (2024)	Peak position
German Albums (Offizielle Top 100)	24
Swiss Albums (Schweizer Hitparade)	26
