= Unnatural Selection (Flotsam and Jetsam album) =

Studio album by Flotsam and Jetsam
- Released: January 26, 1999
- Recorded: 1998
- Studio: The Sound Lab
- Genre: Thrash metal
- Label: Metal Blade
- Producer: James Lockyer & Flotsam and Jetsam

Flotsam and Jetsam chronology
High (1997)	Unnatural Selection (1999)	My God (2001)

Professional ratings
Review scores
Source	Rating
AllMusic	2.5/5 stars
Rock Hard	8/10 stars

Unnatural Selection is the seventh album by American thrash metal band Flotsam and Jetsam, released on January 26, 1999. It was the band's first album with two new members, Craig Nielsen (drums) and Mark Simpson (guitarist).

Unnatural Selection marked as a return to Flotsam and Jetsam's thrashy roots after almost a decade of musical experimentation with their metal sound, although it did continue the trend of most of their 1990s material, with the lyrical content focusing on social and political-related themes, whereas the band's 1980s output had Satanic/occult themes.

== Track listing ==
No.	Title	Length
1.	"Dream Scrape"	4:10
2.	"Chemical Noose"	4:12
3.	"Promise Keepers"	4:34
4.	"Liquid Noose"	3:59
5.	"Falling"	3:40
6.	"Fuckers"	6:00
7.	"Brain Dead"	4:33
8.	"Way to Go"	4:26
9.	"Win, Lose or Dead"	4:28
10.	"Welcome to the Bottom"	5:14

Bonus track
No.	Title	Length
11.	"Mr. Ridiculous"	4:16

== Credits ==
- Edward Carlson – guitars
- Eric A.K. – vocals
- Jason Ward – bass
- Craig Nielsen – drums
- Mark Simpson – guitars
