= Drift (Flotsam and Jetsam album) =

Studio album by Flotsam and Jetsam
- Released: April 25, 1995
- Recorded: 1994–1995
- Studios: Village Productions, Tornillo, Texas
- Genres: Heavy metal, groove metal, thrash metal
- Length: 42:35
- Label: MCA Records
- Producer: Neil Kernon

Flotsam and Jetsam chronology
Cuatro (1992)	Drift (1995)	High (1997)

Professional ratings
Review scores
Source	Rating
AllMusic	3/5 stars
Rock Hard	8/10 stars

Drift is the fifth album by American thrash metal band Flotsam and Jetsam. It was released on April 25, 1995, and is the last of three albums the band released on MCA Records.

The album marked something of a departure from Flotsam and Jetsam's previous works. On it, the band musically and lyrically incorporated some elements of industrial music, groove metal and alternative metal, almost completely abandoning their thrashier sound.

Drift was re-released on June 10, 2008 by Metal Mind Productions. The release is remastered with three bonus tracks and limited to 2,000 copies. It also contains new packaging and liner notes from band members Eric A.K., Jason Ward and Ed Carlson.

== Track listing ==
All songs written by Kelly David-Smith, Eric A.K., Edward Carlson, Michael Gilbert, Jason Ward, Eric Braverman, except where noted

No.	Title	Length
1.	"Me"	3:17
2.	"Empty Air"	3:49
3.	"Pick a Window"	3:47
4.	"12 Year Old with a Gun"	3:30
5.	"Missing"	5:57
6.	"Blindside"	3:35
7.	"Remember"	3:46
8.	"Destructive Signs"	4:55
9.	"Smoked Out"	6:08
10.	"Poet's Tell"	3:57

2008 Metal Mind re-release bonus tracks
No.	Title	Writer(s)	Length
11.	"Destructive Signs" (Radio edit)		3:46
12.	"Fairies Wear Boots" (Black Sabbath cover)	Tony Iommi, Ozzy Osbourne, Geezer Butler, Bill Ward	5:58
13.	"Smoked Out" (Radio edit)		4:01

== Credits ==
- Kelly David-Smith – drums
- Edward Carlson – guitars
- Eric A.K. – vocals
- Jason Ward – bass
- Michael Gilbert – guitars
