= The Cold (album) =

Studio album by Flotsam and Jetsam
- Released: September 14, 2010
- Studio: Phase Four Studios, Tempe, AZ
- Genre: Thrash metal; progressive metal
- Length: 52:03
- Label: Driven Music Group
- Producer: Mark Simpson & Ralph Patlan

Flotsam and Jetsam chronology
Dreams of Death (2005)	The Cold (2010)	Ugly Noise (2012)

Professional ratings
Review scores
Source	Rating
AllMusic	3/5 stars

The Cold is the tenth album by the thrash metal band Flotsam and Jetsam. It was released on 14 September 2010. It was engineered & mixed by Ralph Patlan. The album artwork was created by Travis Smith.

This album has a more progressive metal approach than previous albums. The use of more technical syncopation and rhythms is prevalent throughout. Odd time signatures and elements of technical death metal are used as well.

== Track listing ==
All tracks by Flotsam and Jetsam

No.	Title	Length
1.	"Hypocrite"	4:06
2.	"Take"	4:19
3.	"The Cold"	7:19
4.	"Black Cloud"	4:41
5.	"Blackened Eyes Staring"	4:38
6.	"Better Off Dead"	5:43
7.	"Falling Short"	5:13
8.	"Always"	3:39
9.	"K.Y.A."	5:26
10.	"Secret Life"	7:03

Japanese bonus tracks
No.	Title	Length
11.	"Hammerhead" (live)	6:12
12.	"No Place for Disgrace" (live)	7:23

== Personnel ==
- Eric "A.K." Knutson – vocals
- Ed Carlson – guitars
- Jason Ward – bass guitar
- Mark Simpson – guitars
- Craig Nielsen – drums
