= Troy Gregory =

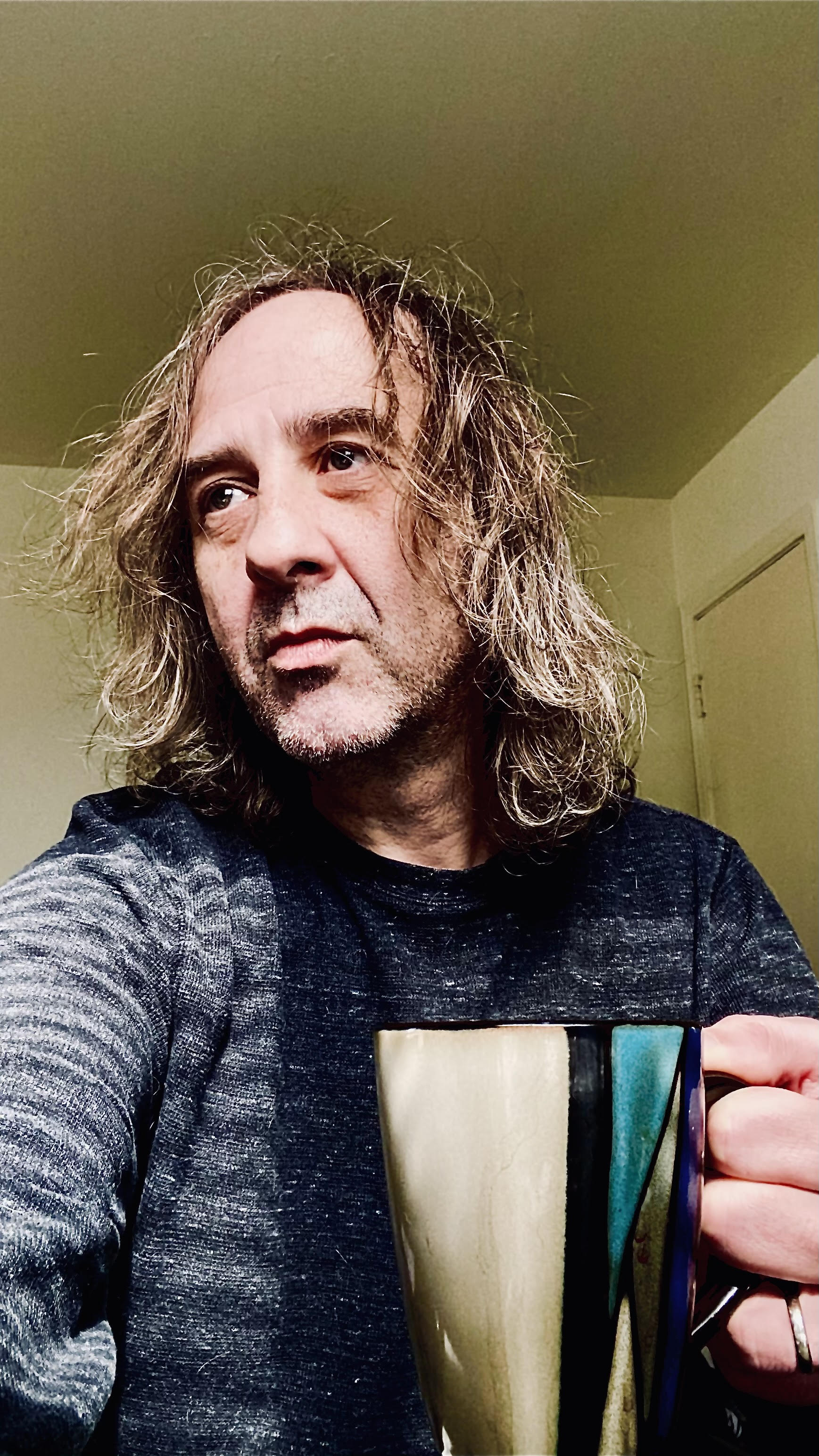
- Gregory at Popsicle Patch Studios in Detroit, Michigan, 2021

Background information
- Born: November 13, 1966 (age 59); Detroit, Michigan, U.S.
- Genres: Alternative rock; indie rock; progressive rock; thrash metal; R&B
- Instruments: Vocals; guitar; drums; keyboards; bass; violin; cello
- Years active: 1988–present

Troy Gregory (born November 13, 1966) is an American singer, songwriter, multi-instrumentalist, filmmaker, film composer, solo artist, and member of The Dirtbombs. Since 2018 for his solo albums he has composed, produced, and performed all instruments by himself. Additionally he creates his own album art and music videos. In 2010 he wrote, directed, edited, scored and acted in the film World War Love. Former acts he has worked with include Crime & the City Solution, Flotsam and Jetsam, Prong, Sixto Diaz Rodriguez, Kim Fowley, Andre Williams, Killing Joke, Electric Six, Nathaniel Mayer, The Volebeats, Spiritualized, Swans, and Damo Suzuki.

== Discography ==
=== As Troy Gregory ===
- Sybil (2002, Fall of Rome Records)
- Laura (2004, Fall of Rome Records)
- "Xaviera" (2018, Jett Plastic Recordings)
- "Sand Dollar Castle" (2022, Popsicle Patch)
- "Heroically Versed In Complex Ecosystems" (2022, Popsicle Patch)
- "The Carnival Crowd" (2022, Popsicle Patch)
- “Willow Ash Oak Juniper” (2022, Popsicle Patch)
- “Magic Lantern Frosted Lashes” (2022, Popsicle Patch)
- “The Anthropocene Scene” (2022, Popsicle Patch)

=== With Super Birthday ===
- Abracapocus (2019, Popsicle Patch)

=== With The Witches ===
- Let's Go to the No Go Zone (1998, Pushover Records)
- Universal Mall (2000, Fall of Rome Records)
- On Parade (2002, Fall of Rome Records)
- Thriller (2006, Music for Cats)
- "A Haunted Persons Guide to the Witches" (2011, Alive Natural Sound Records)

=== With The Dirtbombs ===
- Dangerous Magical Noise (2003, In The Red Records)
- Billiards at Nine Thirty (2005, Sounds Subterrania)
- If You Don't Already Have a Look (2005, In the Red Records)
- We Have You Surrounded (2008, In the Red Records)

=== With Simon Bonney ===
- Past, Present, Future (2019, Mute Records)

=== With Crime and the City Solution ===
- "American Twilight" (2013, Mute Records)

=== With Nathaniel Mayer ===
- Why Don't You Give It to Me (2007, Alive Natural Sound Records)
- Why Won't You Let Me Be Black (2009, Alive Natural Sound Records)

=== With Denise James ===
- It's Not Enough to Love, (2004, Rainbow Quartz)

=== With Monster Island ===
- Dream Tiger, (2001, End Is Here)

=== With Larval ===
- Larval 2, (1998, Knitting Factory)

=== With Medusa Cyclone ===
- Medusa Cyclone, (1995, Third Gear)

=== With Flotsam and Jetsam ===
- No Place for Disgrace (1988, Roadrunner Records/ Elektra Records)
- When the Storm Comes Down (1990, MCA Records)

=== With Prong ===
- Prove You Wrong (1991, Epic Records)

=== With Swans ===
- Love of Life (1992, Young God Records)

=== With Spiritualized ===
- "A & E" (2008, Fontana Records)

=== With Andre Williams ===
- "That's All I Need" (2010, Bloodshot Records)
- "Hoods And Shades" (2012, Bloodshot Records)
- "I Wanna Go Back To Detroit City" (2016, Bloodshot Records)
