= Doomsday for the Deceiver =

Studio album by Flotsam and Jetsam
- Released: July 4, 1986
- Recorded: 1986
- Studios: Music Grinder Studios, Eldorado Studios and Track Records, Los Angeles, California
- Genres: Thrash metal, speed metal
- Length: 55:05
- Label: Metal Blade
- Producers: Brian Slagel; Flotsam and Jetsam

Flotsam and Jetsam chronology
| Doomsday for the Deceiver (1986) | No Place for Disgrace (1988) |

Professional ratings
Review scores
| Source | Rating |
|---|---|
| Allmusic | 4/5 stars |
| Rock Hard | 9.5/10 |
| Metal.de | 10/10 stars |

Doomsday for the Deceiver is the debut album by Flotsam and Jetsam. It was released on July 4, 1986, on a budget of $12,000, and recorded in two weeks. It is the only album by Flotsam and Jetsam with Jason Newsted before his departure for Metallica. Most lyrics were written by Newsted; his songwriting contributions also appeared on the band's next album No Place for Disgrace (1988) and Ugly Noise (2012).

It is considered an essential release in the thrash metal genre.

== Overview ==
While most of their later albums focused more on politics and society in general, the lyrical content of Doomsday for the Deceiver is centered around themes related to history and literature, as well as Satanism and the occult. "She Took an Axe" relates the story of Lizzie Borden, who had been suspected of murdering her parents in 1892, and has a jump-rope rhyme written about her at the time as a refrain. "Der Fuhrer" refers to Adolf Hitler; the lyrics are more or less a story about him, in which he is portrayed as being evil and a "demon", but were not meant to be sympathetic towards Hitler or the Nazi Party.

The album was re-released in 2006, including a re-mixed and re-mastered version, DVD, and original release. This album was the first of only a handful to ever receive a 6K rating from the influential British magazine Kerrang!. The album cover can be seen in the 1988 movie Sleepaway Camp II: Unhappy Campers.

== Reception and awards ==
Doomsday for the Deceiver was ranked at number six on Loudwire's top ten list of "Thrash Albums NOT Released by the Big 4". Doomsday was also inducted into Decibel Magazine’s Hall of Fame in 2021.

== Track listing ==
All songs written by Kelly David-Smith, Edward Carlson, Eric A.K., Jason Newsted, Michael Gilbert. All lyrics by Jason Newsted except "Iron Tears" by Jason Newsted and Jennifer Lowe, "Metalshock" by Jason Newsted and Eric A.K., "U.L.S.W." by Jason Newsted and Edward Carlson.

| No. | Title | Length |
|---|---|---|
| 1. | "Hammerhead" | 6:15 |
| 2. | "Iron Tears" | 3:52 |
| 3. | "Desecrator" | 3:49 |
| 4. | "Fade to Black" | 2:05 |
| 5. | "Doomsday for the Deceiver" | 9:12 |
| 6. | "Metalshock" | 8:17 |
| 7. | "She Took an Axe" | 5:15 |
| 8. | "U.L.S.W. (Ugly Lying Stinking Wench)" | 4:23 |
| 9. | "Der Fuhrer" | 5:46 |
| 10. | "Flotzilla" (This song does not appear on the vinyl LP format.) | 6:07 |

20th-anniversary special edition bonus tracks

CD 1: Doomsday for the Deceiver bonus tracks from Iron Tears demo
| No. | Title | Length |
|---|---|---|
| 11. | "Iron Tears" | 4:05 |
| 12. | "I Live You Die" | 6:06 |

CD 2: Re-mixed and Re-mastered bonus tracks from 1985's Metal Shock
| No. | Title | Length |
|---|---|---|
| 11. | "Hammerhead" | 6:34 |
| 12. | "The Evil Sheik" | 5:26 |
| 13. | "I Live You Die" | 6:26 |
| 14. | "The Beast Within" (Stormtrooper cover) | 4:09 |

== Credits ==
=== Band ===
- Eric A.K. Knutson - lead vocals
- Edward Carlson - guitars, backing vocals
- Michael Gilbert - guitars, backing vocals
- Jason Newsted - bass, backing vocals
- Kelly David-Smith - drums, backing vocals

=== Other ===
- Brian Slagel - producing
- Flotsam and Jetsam - producing, arrangements
- Bill Metoyer - engineering
- Mastered at Capitol Mastering
- Kevin Tyler - cover art
