= Jeff Ward (musician) =

American drummer (1962–1993)

- Born: Jeffrey Thomas Ward; November 18, 1962
- Died: March 19, 1993 (aged 30)
- Citizenship: American
- Occupation: Musician
- Years active: 1986–1993

This is the American musician known for performing with Nine Inch Nails and Al Jourgensen’s music projects. For other individuals, see Jeff Ward.

Jeffrey Thomas Ward (November 18, 1962 – March 19, 1993), was an American musician, serving as a drummer for various rock bands including Skafish, Hammeron, Nine Inch Nails, Revolting Cocks, Ministry, Lard (drums and vocals), and Low Pop Suicide. He provided vocals and drums for 1000 Homo DJs, most notably "Hey Asshole", in which he voices a police officer.

== Death ==
Ward died by suicide by carbon monoxide poisoning in 1993.

=== Tributes ===
Revolting Cocks' 1993 album Linger Ficken' Good, Nine Inch Nails' 1994 album The Downward Spiral, Ministry's 1996 album Filth Pig, and Lard's 1997 release Pure Chewing Satisfaction all featured dedications to him, while Ward's friend (and Nine Inch Nails bandmate) Richard Patrick dealt with his death in the Filter track "It's Over". Flotsam and Jetsam, in which Ward's younger brother Jason played as a band member, dedicated their 1995 album Drift to Ward.
