= Lard (band) =

American band

- Origin: Chicago, Illinois, U.S.
- Genres: Industrial rock, punk rock
- Years active: 1988–2000, 2020–present
- Label: Alternative Tentacles
- Members: Jello Biafra; Al Jourgensen
- Past members: Paul Barker; Jeff Ward; Bill Rieflin; Mike Scaccia; Rey Washam

Lard is an American industrial rock band founded in 1988 as a side project by Jello Biafra (vocals; formerly of Dead Kennedys), Al Jourgensen (guitar; of Ministry), Paul Barker (bass; also of Ministry), and Jeff Ward (drums; once a Ministry touring member). Over the years, several other members of Ministry played with Lard, namely Bill Rieflin, Mike Scaccia, and Rey Washam.

Like most of Biafra's work, Lard's songs are angrily political (the war on drugs is a particularly common theme) but often have a tinge of humor.

I Wanna Be a Drug Sniffing Dog
"I Wanna Be a Drug Sniffing Dog" from Pure Chewing Satisfaction

Lard has not officially toured and has only performed live a handful of times, mostly around the San Francisco area (where Jello lives and operates his Alternative Tentacles record label). The band played during Ministry's 1988 tour and throughout their 1989–1990 dates, once in Chicago after wrapping the recording of The Last Temptation of Reid, once at the conclusion of a Ministry concert in Los Angeles (March 24, 2003), and at the San Francisco (September 26, 2004), Portland (September 28, 2004) and Seattle (September 29, 2004) dates of Ministry's Evil Doer tour. Because its key members are active with other projects, it is unlikely that the band will tour.

According to a March 2009 interview with Jourgensen, he and Biafra are working on a new Lard album, which was to be recorded in Jourgensen's El Paso studio. However, according to a January 2010 interview with Jello Biafra, he indicated that a new Lard album was unlikely, saying "Me and Al have talked about it for years, but we've never been able to nail down a time to try and put it together.".

According to a 2020 interview, Jourgensen said that he and Biafra plan to make a brand new Lard album soon with them emailing songs back and forth.

== Discography ==
=== Albums ===
List of albums, with selected details and chart positions
Title	Album details	Peak chart positions	
Title	Album details	AUS	UK
The Last Temptation of Reid	Released: 1990; Label: Alternative Tentacles; Format: CD, LP, cassette	—	69
Pure Chewing Satisfaction	Released: 1997; Label: Alternative Tentacles; Format: CD	77	—

=== Extended plays ===
List of EPs, with selected details
Title	Details
The Power of Lard	Released: 1989; Label: Alternative Tentacles; Format: CD, LP, cassette
70's Rock Must Die	Released: February 2000; Label: Alternative Tentacles; Format: CD, LP

=== Singles ===
List of singles
Title	Year	Label	Note
"I Am Your Clock"	1990	Alternative Tentacles	Also included on certain versions of the album The Last Temptation of Reid

=== Compilation appearances ===
Lard tracks on compilation albums
Release date	Song	Title	Label
1992	"Drug Raid at 4am"	The Bat Is Back - An Alternative Tentacles Records Sampler	Alternative Tentacles
1994	"Forkboy"	Natural Born Killers: A Soundtrack for an Oliver Stone Film	Nothing Records
1994	"Forkboy"	Selections From Natural Born Killers: A Soundtrack for an Oliver Stone Film	Nothing Records/Interscope Records
1994	"Forkboy"	The Futility of a Well Ordered Life	Alternative Tentacles
1996	"Forkboy"	Music from and Inspired by Natural Born Killers, an Oliver Stone Film	Nothing Records/Interscope Records
1997	"I Wanna Be a Drug-Sniffing Dog"	Mind the Gap Volume 14	Gonzo Circus
1997	"I Wanna Be a Drug-Sniffing Dog"	The Virus That Would Not Die!	Alternative Tentacles
1997	"Generation Execute"	Rock Sound Volume 9	Rock Sound
1998	"The Power of Lard"	The New, the Classic & the Unexplored	Visions Magazine
	"The Power of Lard"	The Record Shop - 30 Years of Rough Trade Shops	V2 Records, Inc.
2000	"Ballad of Marshall Ledbetter"	Movie Madness	Riffage Records
