= Ugly Noise =

Studio album by Flotsam and Jetsam
- Released: December 21, 2012
- Recorded: 2011–2012
- Genre: Thrash metal; progressive metal
- Length: 47:27

Flotsam and Jetsam chronology
The Cold (2010)	Ugly Noise (2012)	Flotsam and Jetsam (2016)

Ugly Noise is the eleventh studio album by the thrash metal band Flotsam and Jetsam, released on December 21, 2012. In order to make this album, Flotsam and Jetsam used PledgeMusic, encouraging their fans to contribute funds to its recording and the band themselves to donate to charity as a part of their fundraising.

Ugly Noise marked the first Flotsam and Jetsam album recorded with two of its original members Michael Gilbert (guitar) and Kelly David Smith (drums) since 1997's High. Original bassist Jason Newsted also co-wrote some songs for the album, but did not officially rejoin the band. It is the last album to feature Jason Ward on bass, and Edward Carlson on guitar, although he would be featured on the re-recording of No Place for Disgrace.

Professional ratings
Review scores
Source	Rating
Sputnikmusic	3.2/5
Blabbermouth.net	6/10

== Track listing ==
No.	Title	Length
1.	"Ugly Noise"	4:10
2.	"Gitty Up"	3:09
3.	"Run and Hide"	5:28
4.	"Carry On"	4:19
5.	"Rabbit's Foot"	4:17
6.	"Play Your Part"	5:29
7.	"Rage"	3:25
8.	"Cross the Sky"	4:45
9.	"Motherfuckery"	3:07
10.	"I Believe"	2:53
11.	"To Be Free"	3:08
12.	"Machine Gun"	3:17

== Personnel ==
- Eric A. "A.K." Knutson — vocals
- Ed Carlson — guitar
- Michael Gilbert — guitar
- Jason Ward — bass
- Kelly David-Smith — drums
