= List of songs recorded by Dead Kennedys =

Below is a list of all songs that have been recorded by the California hardcore punk band Dead Kennedys.

== List ==
The band is Jello Biafra, East Bay Ray, Klaus Flouride, Ted (Fresh Fruit for Rotting Vegetables), and D.H. Peligro (Post-FFfRV). 6025 was the second guitarist from 1978 to 1979.

Title	Release	Release Year	Length	Songwriters	Notes
Advice from Christmas Past	Plastic Surgery Disasters	1982	0:55	Biafra	
A Child and His Lawnmower	Give Me Convenience or Give Me Death	1987	0:57	Biafra	
A Growing Boy Needs His Lunch	Frankenchrist	1985	5:50	Biafra	
Anarchy for Sale	Bedtime for Democracy	1986	1:18	Biafra	
At My Job	Frankenchrist	1985	3:41	Ray	
Back In Rhodesida	Live at the Deaf Club	2004	1:31	Biafra	Early version of When Ya Get Drafted.
Back In the U.S.S.R.	Live at the Deaf Club	2004	2:31	Lennon-McCartney	Cover.
Bleed for Me	Plastic Surgery Disasters	1982	3:24	Dead Kennedys	Also released as a single.
Buzzbomb	Plastic Surgery Disasters	1982	2:21	Biafra, Ray	
Buzzbomb from Pasadena	Give Me Convenience or Give Me Death	1987	2:22	Biafra, Ray	
California Über Alles	Fresh Fruit for Rotting Vegetables	1980	3:03	Biafra, John Greenway	
California Über Alles	Give Me Convenience or Give Me Death	1987	3:28	Biafra, John Greenway	Original single from 1979, with The Man With the Dogs as its B-side.
Cesspools In Eden	Bedtime for Democracy	1986	5:56	Dead Kennedys	
Chemical Warfare	Fresh Fruit for Rotting Vegetables	1980	2:55	Biafra	
Chicken Farm	Frankenchrist	1985	5:06	Biafra	
Chickenshit Conformist	Bedtime for Democracy	1986	5:58	Biafra	
Dead End	Plastic Surgery Disasters	1982	3:56	Ray	
Dear Abby	Bedtime for Democracy	1986	1:09	Biafra	
D.M.S.O.	Bedtime for Democracy	1986	2:09	Dead Kennedys	
Dog Bite	In God We Trust, Inc.	1981	1:13	Flouride	
Do the Slag	Bedtime for Democracy	1986	1:36	Ray	
Drug Me	Fresh Fruit for Rotting Vegetables	1980	1:56	Biafra	
Fleshdunce	Bedtime for Democracy	1986	1:29	Biafra	
Forest Fire	Plastic Surgery Disasters	1982	2:22	Biafra	
Forward to Death	Fresh Fruit for Rotting Vegetables	1980	1:23	6025	
Funland at the Beach	Fresh Fruit for Rotting Vegetables	1980	1:49	Biafra	
Gaslight	Live at the Deaf Club	2004	2:40	6025	
Gone With My Wind	Bedtime for Democracy	1986	1:48	Biafra	
Goons of Hazzard	Frankenchrist	1985	4:25	Biafra, Ray	
Government Flu	Plastic Surgery Disasters	1982	2:04	Biafra	
The Great Wall	Bedtime for Democracy	1986	1:32	Biafra	
Halloween	Plastic Surgery Disasters	1982	3:35	Biafra, Ray	Original (and final) single from 1982, with Saturday Night Holocaust as its B-side.
Have I the Right?	Live at the Deaf Club	2004	2:16	Alan Blaikley, Ken Howard	Cover.
Hellnation	Frankenchrist	1985	2:22	Peligro	
Holiday In Cambodia	Fresh Fruit for Rotting Vegetables	1980	4:37	Dead Kennedys	
Holiday In Cambodia	Give Me Convenience or Give Me Death	1987	3:46	Dead Kennedys	Original single from 1980, with Police Truck as its B-side.
Hop With the Jet Set	Bedtime for Democracy	1986	2:05	Biafra	
Hyperactive Child	In God We Trust, Inc.	1981	0:37	Biafra	
I Am the Owl	Plastic Surgery Disasters	1982	4:51	Dead Kennedys	
I Fought the Law	Give Me Convenience or Give Me Death	1987	2:21	Sonny Curtis, Biafra	Cover with altered lyrics.
I Kill Children	Fresh Fruit for Rotting Vegetables	1980	2:04	Biafra	
Ill In the Head	Fresh Fruit for Rotting Vegetables	1980	2:46	Biafra, 6025	
Insight	Give Me Convenience or Give Me Death	1987	1:42	Biafra	Original single from 1980, with Kill the Poor as its A-side.
I Spy	Bedtime for Democracy	1986	2:30	Peligro	
Jock-O-Rama (Invasion of the Beef Patrol)	Frankenchrist	1985	4:06	Biafra	
Kepone Factory	Fresh Fruit for Rotting Vegetables	1980	1:18	Biafra	
Kill the Poor	Fresh Fruit for Rotting Vegetables	1980	3:07	Biafra, Ray	Original single from 1980, with Insight as its B-side.
Kill the Poor (Disco version)	Live at the Deaf Club	2004	3:57	Biafra, Ray	Early disco version of Kill the Poor, usually provided as an alternative at early shows.
Kinky Sex Makes the World Go 'Round	Give Me Convenience or Give Me Death	1987	4:17	Dead Kennedys	
Let's Lynch the Landlord	Fresh Fruit for Rotting Vegetables	1980	2:13	Biafra	
Lie Detector	Bedtime for Democracy	1986	3:43	Biafra, Ray	
Life Sentence	Give Me Convenience or Give Me Death	1987	2:41	Biafra	Original single from 1982, with Bleed for Me as its A-side.
Macho Insecurity	Bedtime for Democracy	1986	1:30	Biafra	
The Man With the Dogs	Give Me Convenience or Give Me Death	1987	3:04	Biafra, Greenway	Original single from 1979, with California Über Alles as its A-side.
Moon Over Marin	Plastic Surgery Disasters	1982	4:29	Biafra, Ray	
Moral Majority	In God We Trust, Inc.	1981	1:55	Biafra	
M.T.V. Get Off the Air	Frankenchrist	1985	3:37	Biafra	
Nazi Punks Fuck Off	In God We Trust, Inc.	1981	1:03	Biafra	Also released as a single.
Night of the Living Rednecks	Give Me Convenience or Give Me Death	1987	5:14	Biafra, Flouride, Ted	Recorded live from the Earth Tavern, Portland, Oregon, November 19, 1979.
One-Way Ticket to Pluto	Bedtime for Democracy	1986	1:38	Biafra	
Police Truck	Give Me Convenience or Give Me Death	1987	2:27	Biafra, Ray	Original single from 1980, with Holiday In Cambodia as its A-side.
Potshot Heard 'Round the World	Bedtime for Democracy	1986	2:10	Biafra, Ray	
The Prey	Give Me Convenience or Give Me Death	1987	3:50	Biafra, Ray	Original single from 1981, with Too Drunk to Fuck as its A-side.
Pull My Strings	Give Me Convenience or Give Me Death	1987	5:47	Biafra, Ted	Recorded live from the Bay Area Music Awards, March 25, 1980.
Rambozo the Clown	Bedtime for Democracy	1986	2:25	Biafra	
Rawhide	In God We Trust, Inc.	1981	2:11	Ned Washington, Dimitri Tiomkin	Cover.
Religious Vomit	In God We Trust, Inc.	1981	1:04	6025	
Riot	Plastic Surgery Disasters	1982	5:57	Dead Kennedys	
Saturday Night Holocaust	Give Me Convenience or Give Me Death	1987	4:21	Dead Kennedys	Original single from 1982, with Halloween as its A-side.
Short Songs	Give Me Convenience or Give Me Death	1987	0:29	6025	Recorded live from The Deaf Club, March 3, 1979.
Shrink	Bedtime for Democracy	1986	1:44	Biafra	
Soup Is Good Food	Frankenchrist	1985	4:18	Biafra	
Stars and Stripes of Corruption	Frankenchrist	1985	6:23	Biafra	
Stealing People's Mail	Fresh Fruit for Rotting Vegetables	1980	1:34	Biafra	
Straight A's	Give Me Convenience or Give Me Death	1987	2:15	6025	Recorded live from The Deaf Club, March 3, 1979.
Take This Job and Shove It	Bedtime for Democracy	1986	1:25	David Allan Coe	Cover.
Terminal Preppie	Plastic Surgery Disasters	1982	1:30	Biafra	
This Could Be Anywhere (This Could Be Everywhere)	Frankenchrist	1985	5:24	Biafra	
Triumph of the Swill	Bedtime for Democracy	1986	2:17	Biafra	
Too Drunk to Fuck	Give Me Convenience or Give Me Death	1987	2:42	Biafra	Original single from 1981, with The Prey as its B-side.
Trust Your Mechanic	Plastic Surgery Disasters	1982	2:55	Biafra	
Viva Las Vegas	Fresh Fruit for Rotting Vegetables	1980	2:42	Doc Pomus, Mort Shuman	Cover.
Well Paid Scientist	Plastic Surgery Disasters	1982	2:21	Biafra	
We've Got a Bigger Problem Now	In God We Trust, Inc.	1981	4:29	Dead Kennedys, John Greenway	Updated version of California Über Alles for the Reagan administration.
When Ya Get Drafted	Fresh Fruit for Rotting Vegetables	1980	1:23	Biafra	
Where Do Ya Draw the Line	Bedtime for Democracy	1986	2:39	Biafra	
Winnebago Warrior	Plastic Surgery Disasters	1982	2:09	Biafra	
Your Emotions	Fresh Fruit for Rotting Vegetables	1980	1:20	Ray	
