= Soup Is Good Food =

- "Soup is Good Food" is an advertising slogan for Campbell's Soup
- "Soup Is Good Food" is the title of the opening song of the Dead Kennedys' album, Frankenchrist.
