= Ronald Greer =

Ronald Greer may refer to:

- J. Ronnie Greer (born 1952), United States federal judge
- Ron Greer (Wisconsin politician), Wisconsin politician
- Ronald Greer (Stargate), a character in Stargate Universe
- Ron "Skip" Greer, lead vocalist for the Dead Kennedys
