= Steve Wilson (drummer) =

American drummer

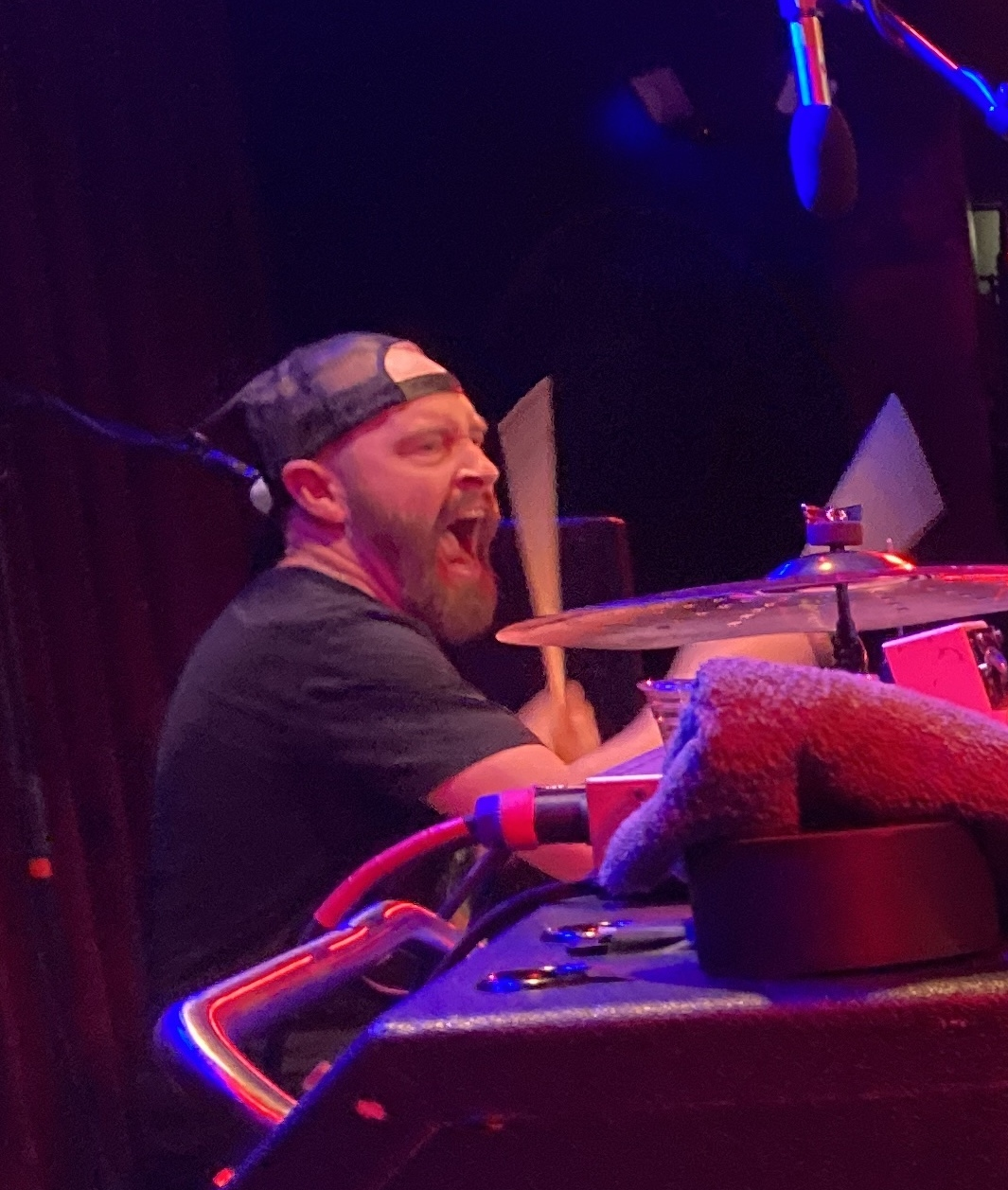
- Wilson with DK in 2025
- Occupation: drummer

Steve Wilson is an American musician and voice actor who plays drums in the Dead Kennedys and Against All Will.

Wilson played drums for D. H. Peligro's solo project, Peligro, and became a touring member of the Dead Kennedys after Peligro's death in 2022. Wilson also played on East Bay Ray's solo project East Bay Ray and The Killer Smiles. He played drums with t.A.T.u. from 2006 through 2011 as Steve "Boomstick" Wilson and appeared on a few of Lena Katina's solo albums. He plays a Pearl drum kit.

Wilson lives in the Nashville area and does voice acting in addition to his drumming work.
