= Parents Music Resource Center =

Defunct American committee

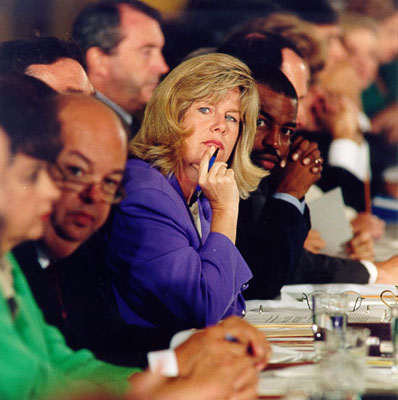
Tipper Gore, co-founder of the Parents Music Resource Center, in 1985

The Parents Music Resource Center (PMRC) was a bipartisan United States government committee formed in 1985 with the stated goal of increasing parental control over children's access to music deemed to have violent, drug-related, or sexual themes. The committee's work led to the widespread adoption of the Parental Advisory sticker. The PMRC was known for its prejudicial targeting of rock and heavy metal music, which drew opposition and criticism. On political and religious grounds, the committee was supported by American televangelists, Reaganites, and the larger evangelical movement, who accused rock and heavy metal lyrics of harboring Satanic and occult related themes.

The committee was founded by four women known as the "Washington Wives"—a reference to their husbands' connections with government in the Washington, D.C. area. The women who founded the PMRC are Tipper Gore, wife of Senator and later Vice President Al Gore; Susan Baker, wife of Treasury Secretary James Baker; Pam Howar, wife of Washington realtor Raymond Howar; and Sally Nevius, wife of former Washington City Council Chairman John Nevius. The PMRC eventually grew to include 22 participants before shutting down in the mid-to-late 1990s.

== Early history ==
The Parents Music Resource Center was founded in May 1985. The group's formation was cemented with the financial help of Mike Love of the Beach Boys, and Joseph Coors, the owner of Coors beers. Both had actively supported Reagan's candidacy, and Coors offered offices to the PMRC.

== Actions ==
As a method of combating this alleged problem, the PMRC suggested a voluntary move by the RIAA and the music industry to develop music labeling in the form of a rating system similar to the film rating system developed by the Motion Picture Association of America. Additional suggestions from the PMRC that appeared in an article in The Washington Post included: printing warnings and lyrics on album covers, requiring record stores to put albums with explicit covers under the counters, pressuring television stations not to broadcast explicit songs or videos, "reassess[ing]" the contracts of musicians who performed violently or sexually in concert, and creating a panel to set industry standards.

== Filthy Fifteen ==
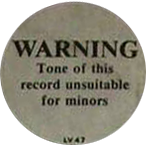
As a result of the controversy surrounding "Darling Nikki", this early version of the Parental Advisory sticker was used on re-issues of the album Purple Rain (1984) by Prince.

One of the actions taken by the PMRC was compiling a list of fifteen songs in popular music, at the time, that they found the most objectionable. This list is known as the "Filthy Fifteen" and consists of the following songs along with the lyrical content category for which each song was considered objectionable:

#	Artist	Song title	Lyrical content
1	Prince	"Darling Nikki"	Sex/masturbation
2	Sheena Easton	"Sugar Walls"	Sex
3	Judas Priest	"Eat Me Alive"	Sex/violence
4	Vanity	"Strap On 'Robbie Baby'"	Sex
5	Mötley Crüe	"Bastard"	Violence/language
6	AC/DC	"Let Me Put My Love into You"	Sex
7	Twisted Sister	"We're Not Gonna Take It"	Violence
8	Madonna	"Dress You Up"	Sex
9	W.A.S.P.	"Animal (Fuck Like a Beast)"	Sex/language/violence
10	Def Leppard	"High 'n' Dry (Saturday Night)"	Drug and alcohol use
11	Mercyful Fate	"Into the Coven"	Occult
12	Black Sabbath	"Trashed"	Drug and alcohol use
13	Mary Jane Girls	"In My House"	Sex
14	Venom	"Possessed"	Occult
15	Cyndi Lauper	"She Bop"	Sex/masturbation

== Senate hearing ==
U.S. Senator Paula Hawkins in 1986. Hawkins, along with other senators, expressed concerns over explicit content in the music industry.

In August 1985, 19 record companies agreed to put "Parental Guidance: Explicit Lyrics" labels on albums to warn consumers of explicit lyrical content. Before the labels could be put into place, the Senate agreed to hold a hearing on so-called "porn rock". The hearing was held on September 19, 1985, when representatives from the PMRC, three musicians—Dee Snider, Frank Zappa, John Denver—and Senators Paula Hawkins, Al Gore, and others testified before the Senate Commerce, Science and Transportation Committee on "the subject of the content of certain sound recordings and suggestions that recording packages be labeled to provide a warning to prospective purchasers of sexually explicit or other potentially offensive content."

=== Supporting witnesses ===
Paula Hawkins presented three record covers (Pyromania by Def Leppard, W.O.W. by Wendy O. Williams, and W.A.S.P. by W.A.S.P.) and the music videos for "Hot for Teacher" by Van Halen, and "We're Not Gonna Take It" by Twisted Sister, commenting: "Much has changed since Elvis' seemingly innocent times. Subtleties, suggestions, and innuendo have given way to overt expressions and descriptions of often violent sexual acts, drug taking, and flirtations with the occult. The record album covers to me are self-explanatory."

Susan Baker testified that "There certainly are many causes for these ills in our society, but it is our contention that the pervasive messages aimed at children which promote and glorify suicide, rape, sadomasochism, and so on, have to be numbered among the contributing factors." Tipper Gore asked record companies to voluntarily "plac[e] a warning label on music products inappropriate for younger children due to explicit sexual or violent lyrics."

National PTA Vice President for Legislative Activity Millie Waterman related the PTA's role in the debate, and proposed printing the symbol "R" on the cover of recordings containing "explicit sexual language, violence, profanity, the occult and glorification of drugs and alcohol", and providing lyrics for "R"-labeled albums.

In addition, Dr. Joe Stuessy, a music professor at the University of Texas at San Antonio, spoke regarding the power of music to influence behavior. He argued that heavy metal was different from earlier forms of music such as jazz and rock and roll because it was "church music" and "had as one of its central elements the element of hatred." Dr. Paul King, a child and adolescent psychiatrist, testified on the deification of heavy metal musicians, and to the presentation of heavy metal as a religion. He also stated that "many" adolescents read deeply into song lyrics.

=== Opposing witnesses ===
During his statement, musician and producer Frank Zappa asserted that "the PMRC proposal is an ill-conceived piece of nonsense which fails to deliver any real benefits to children, infringes the civil liberties of people who are not children, and promises to keep the courts busy for years dealing with the interpretational and enforcemental problems inherent in the proposal's design." He went on to state his suspicion that the hearings were a front for H.R. 2911, a proposed blank tape tax: "The major record labels need to have H.R. 2911 whiz through a few committees before anybody smells a rat. One of them is chaired by Senator Thurmond. Is it a coincidence that Mrs. Thurmond is affiliated with the PMRC?" Zappa had earlier stated about the Senate's agreement to hold a hearing on the matter that "A couple of blowjobs here and there and Bingo!—you get a hearing."

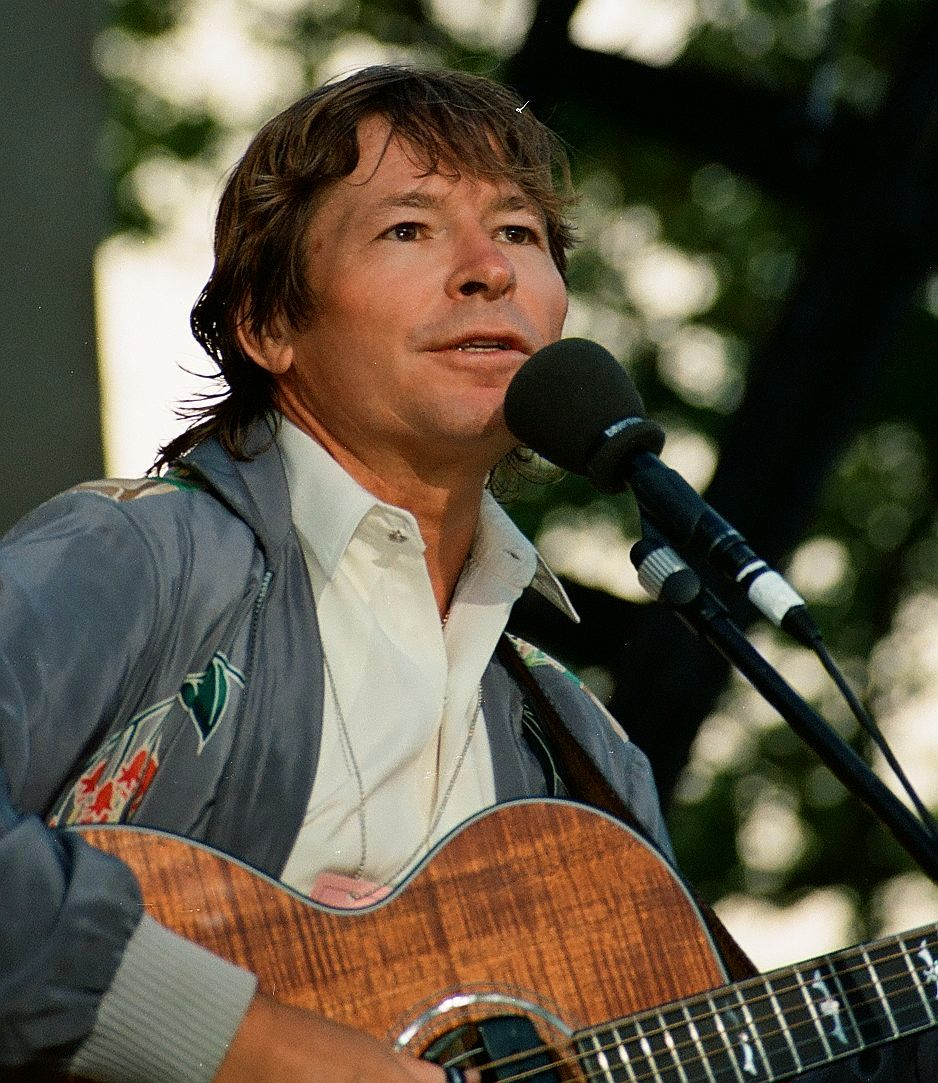
As a surprise opposing witness, singer John Denver implied the PMRC was violating the First Amendment, and equated their actions to those of Nazi book burnings.

Folk rock musician John Denver referred to the proposed labels as censorship and stated he was "strongly opposed to censorship of any kind in our society or anywhere else in the world", and that in his experience censors often misinterpret music, as was the case with his song "Rocky Mountain High". He further compared the PMRC proposals to Nazi book burnings, and expressed his belief that censorship is ultimately counterproductive: "That which is denied becomes that which is most desired, and that which is hidden becomes that which is most interesting. Consequently, a great deal of time and energy is spent trying to get at what is being kept from you." When Denver came up to give his speech, many expected him to side with the PMRC.

Dee Snider, frontman and lead singer of the heavy metal band Twisted Sister, testified that he "[did] not support ... [RIAA president] Gortikov's unnecessary and unfortunate decision to agree to a so-called generic label on some selected records". Like John Denver, Snider felt that his music had been misinterpreted. He defended the Twisted Sister songs "Under the Blade", which had been interpreted by the PMRC as referring to sadomasochism, bondage, and rape, and "We're Not Gonna Take It", which the PMRC accused of promoting violence. Snider told the panel that "Under the Blade" was inspired by a band member's surgery and was about the fear he imagined one would experience undergoing surgery, announcing that "the only sadomasochism, bondage, and rape in this song is in the mind of Ms. Gore." He further stated "Ms. Gore was looking for sadomasochism and bondage, and she found it. Someone looking for surgical references would have found it as well." Snider concluded that "The full responsibility for defending my children falls on the shoulders of my wife and I, because there is no one else capable of making these judgments for us."

Notable snippets of audio from the hearing found their way into Zappa's audiocollage "Porn Wars", released on the Frank Zappa Meets the Mothers of Prevention album. Senators Gore, Hollings, Gorton, Hawkins, and others appeared. The album cover featured a parody of the RIAA warning label. The LP included a note to listeners to send to Zappa's Barking Pumpkin Records for a free Z-PAC, a printed information package that included transcripts of the committee hearing, and a letter from Zappa encouraging young people to register to vote. Zappa's full testimonial was released on a posthumous 2010 compilation called Congress Shall Make No Law...

== Parental Advisory sticker ==
The current Parental Advisory warning label, introduced in 1996.

The former design for the Parental Advisory label introduced in 1990. This logo co-existed with the current label from 1996 to 2001.

On November 1, 1985, before the hearing ended, the RIAA agreed to put "Parental Advisory" labels on selected releases at their own discretion. The labels were generic, unlike the original idea of a descriptive label categorizing the explicit lyrics. Many stores refused to sell albums containing the label (including Wal-Mart), and others limited sales of those albums to adults.

It is uncertain whether the "Tipper sticker" is effective at preventing children from being exposed to explicit content. Some, citing the "forbidden-fruit effect", suggest that the sticker in fact increases record sales. Philip Bailey of Earth, Wind & Fire said that "for the most part [the sticker] might even sell more records in some areas – all you've got to do is tell somebody this is a no-no and then that's what they want to go see." Ice-T's track "Freedom of Speech" contains the lyrics: "Hey, PMRC, you stupid fuckin' assholes/The sticker on the record is what makes 'em sell gold./Can't you see, you alcoholic idiots/The more you try to suppress us, the larger we get." While lyrics from the Furnaceface song "We Love You, Tipper Gore", from their 1991 album Just Buy It, suggest that the label "only whets my appetite ... only makes us want to hear it that much more".

== Musician reaction ==
Many musicians have criticized or parodied the PMRC and Tipper Gore:

- "In a world with major pollution and guns ablaze," John Lydon marveled, "they have to pick on someone using foul language."
- Judas Priest's song "Parental Guidance" from 1986 album Turbo was allegedly written as a response to Tipper Gore's attack on the band and on heavy metal in general.
- Megadeth referenced the PMRC in two songs from their 1988 album, So Far, So Good... So What! The first is a cover version of the song "Anarchy in the UK" with altered lyrics referencing the PMRC as well as the U.S. government law enforcement, "Is this the PMRC? Is this the DEA or is this the CIA? I thought it was the U.S.A." The second is "Hook In Mouth" which contains explicit references in the chorus.
- In 1987, the punk rock band NOFX released an EP titled The P.M.R.C. Can Suck on This.
- Alice Cooper’s 1987 album Raise Your Fist and Yell opened with "Freedom", accusing PMRC members of "pretending that [they’ve] never been bad," and wanting to "become Big Brother."
- Danzig's 1988 song "Mother" scored a top 50 hit as the most famous song about the PMRC labeling and its inherent problems (Mother/Tell your children not to walk my way/Tell your children not to hear my words/What they mean, what they say, mother).
- Some prints of Metallica's 1986 album Master of Puppets contained a parody warning, shaped like a stop sign, that read "THE ONLY TRACK YOU PROBABLY WON'T WANT TO PLAY IS "DAMAGE, INC." DUE TO MULTIPLE USE OF THE INFAMOUS "F" WORD. OTHERWISE, THERE AREN'T ANY "SHITS," "FUCKS," "PISSES," "CUNTS," "MOTHERFUCKERS" OR "COCKSUCKERS" ANYWHERE ON THIS RECORD." This also references George Carlin's "seven dirty words" routine by mentioning six of them (all but "tits").
- Flotsam and Jetsam's song "Hard on You" (from their 1988 album No Place for Disgrace) is a direct reference to the PMRC, with several lines such as "One that's young sees the circled 'R', does he buy it?", "Can't you see, you're ripping away our independence" and "If your committee is so damn right, why did we write this song?"
- Todd Rundgren's 1991 non-album song "Jesse" featured a verse directed toward Tipper Gore, including the lyrics: "I wanna fuck you, Tipper, 'cause you showed me that Things are still the same, Everybody's parents turn out lame, I wanna say "fuck you," Tipper Gore" It was released only as a promotional cassette single, though Rundgren played it live for several years.
- The Aerosmith song "F.I.N.E." from their 1989 album Pump mentions Tipper Gore in the line "Even Tipper thinks I'm alright", the song being explicitly about sex. When accepting a Grammy Award for that album's single Janie's Got a Gun, Aerosmith frontman Steven Tyler sarcastically thanked both Tipper Gore and Senator Jesse Helms (who was not a member of the PMRC but publicly supported the organization) for helping ensure "that if an album has a few dirty words, it'll sell another million copies."
- Ice-T's 1989 album The Iceberg/Freedom of Speech... Just Watch What You Say! contains many criticisms of the PMRC. One song in particular, "Freedom of Speech", is an extended attack on Tipper Gore:

Yo, Tip, what's the matter? You ain't gettin' no dick?
You're bitchin' about rock 'n' roll—that's censorship, dumb bitch
The Constitution says we all got a right to speak
Say what we want, Tip—your argument is weak

In his book The Ice Opinion, Ice-T wrote "Tipper Gore is the only woman I ever directly called a bitch on any of my records, and I meant that in the most negative sense of the word." On "You Shoulda Killed Me Last Year", his spoken-word outro to his album O.G. Original Gangster, he curses the CIA, the LAPD, FBI, George H. W. Bush, and Tipper Gore.

- One of the bonus tracks on Warrant's 1990 album Cherry Pie, titled "Ode to Tipper Gore", is a montage of short audio clips from various live performances by the band, featuring ample use of expletives and obscene language.
- In 1990, Kid Rock released his debut album Grits Sandwiches for Breakfast with one song titled "Pimp of the Nation" where he states that "Tipper Gore is my highest paid whore" which is a diss regarding the PMRC.
- The liner notes of Sonic Youth's 1990 album Goo include a cartoon with the caption "SMASH THE PMRC."
- The cover art for the 1990 PDQ Bach album Oedipus Tex and Other Choral Calamities features a "Pathetic Advisory: Inane Lyrics" warning label.
- Cinderella referenced the PMRC in their song "Shelter Me" (from their Heartbreak Station album) with the lines "Tipper led the war against the record industry, she said she saw the devil on her MTV".
- The 1990 Dead Milkmen song "Do the Brown Nose" includes the lyrics You, yes you, here's a dime, run out and call the PMRC.
- On the 1990 Ministry live album In Case You Didn't Feel Like Showing Up, during their song "Stigmata", lead singer Al Jourgensen curses George H. W. Bush, Barbara Bush, Mikhail Gorbachev, Manuel Noriega and Tipper Gore.
- In the 1992 video for "Hush", Tool perform naked, except for placards over their genitals, designed to resemble the Explicit Lyric warning stickers (but replacing "lyrics" with "parts").
- On July 18, 1993, Rage Against the Machine protested against the PMRC at Lollapalooza III by standing naked onstage with duct tape covering their mouths and the letters PMRC on their chests. The band used up their 14-minute performance time without playing any songs. The only sound emitted was audio feedback from Tom Morello and Tim Commerford's guitars. The band later played a free show for disappointed fans.
- W.A.S.P live album Live... in the Raw includes the song "Harder, Faster", which Blackie Lawless dedicates during the opening of the song to the PMRC.
- KMFDM's irony-laden song "Sucks", from their 1993 album Angst, contains the lyrics:

Our records have stickers with a warning from Tipper
'Cause they're no good for kids; if we'd get her, we'd strip her

- New York-based thrash band Anthrax wrote and composed a song called "Startin' Up a Posse" for their 1991 release Attack of the Killer B's. This song ridicules the members of the PMRC.
- Punk rock band Ramones recorded for their 1992 album Mondo Bizarro the song "Censorshit" about how rock and rap albums were being censored by the PMRC. It mentions Frank Zappa and Ozzy Osbourne, and is addressed to Tipper Gore.
- The third verse of Sir Mix-A-Lot's 1994 single "Put 'Em on the Glass" begins "How many times will you play this/Before you ban this?/I heard Mrs. Gore can't stand this".
- The 1997 Canadian punk band Reset's album No Worries features a track titled "Go Away", which is entirely about their disapproval of the PMRC and Tipper Gore, with one line directly naming Gore.

Tipper, won't you understand the message that I want to say
It's kind of rude but here it goes: it's "fuck you!"
I don't like what you do, and I don't like you.

- On the 2001 Dead Kennedys live album Mutiny on the Bay (recorded in a 1986 concert), during their song "M.T.V. – Get off the Air", lead singer Jello Biafra tells the audience to "buy a homemade [record] instead, before the PMRC closes the stores down that sell 'em." Biafra had earlier been brought to trial on charges of "distributing harmful matter to minors" in an incident involving the 1985 Dead Kennedys's album Frankenchrist, which featured an insert of H. R. Giger's Penis Landscape and a parody sticker on the front cover reading:

WARNING: The inside fold out to this record cover is a work of art by H.R. Giger that some people may find shocking, repulsive or offensive. Life can sometimes be that way.

- Rapper Eminem directly referenced Tipper Gore and indirectly referenced the PMRC in "White America", the opening selection of his 2002 album The Eminem Show; in it, he referred to his mission as being

To burn the {flag} and replace it with a Parental Advisory sticker/
To spit liquor in the faces of this democracy of hypocrisy/
Fuck you, Ms. Cheney; Fuck you, Tipper Gore.

Eminem also included Lynne Cheney, owing to her heavy criticism of his previous album and its explicit lyrical content, The Marshall Mathers LP, at a United States Senate hearing.

- Suicidal Tendencies referenced Tipper Gore in their song "Lovely" from the album Lights...Camera...Revolution!: "Tipper, babe, don't you remember me/Now I'm kinder, gentler, and so happy".
- Harry and the Potters reference Tipper Gore and the PMRC in the title track of their album Voldemort Can't Stop the Rock! with the line "We won't let the Dark Lord ruin our party just like Tipper Gore tried with the PMRC."
- Quiet Riot's music video for their song The Wild and the Young showed rockers being rounded up and arrested by government soldiers while the members of Quiet Riot escape and perform the song underground, then in the final scene it says "In Washington, Congress has just passed legislation that requires record companies to reproduce song lyrics on all album jackets.....The government has also cited the rock and roll band, Quiet Riot, as one of the chief offenders in this ongoing controversy."

== See also ==
- Warning: Parental Advisory
- Parents Television and Media Council
- Terry Rakolta
