= List of Dead Kennedys live performances =

Dead Kennedys are an American hardcore punk band from San Francisco, California. Below is a list of their live performances.

== 1978 ==
Date	Venue	City	Country	Other bands	Shows total	Shows this year	Flyer	Tour
July 19	Mabuhay Gardens	San Francisco, CA	USA	Negative Trend, The Offs, DV8	1	1	1 2	N/A
August 2	Mabuhay Gardens	San Francisco, CA	USA	The Weirdos, X	2	2	N/A	N/A
August 13	Mabuhay Gardens	San Francisco, CA	USA	The Offs, The Eaters	3	3	1	N/A
August 20	Sproul Plaza	Berkeley, CA	USA	The Zeros	4	4	N/A	N/A
August 26	The Rio	Rodeo, CA	USA	Sleepers, Permanent Wave, The Offs, P.P.	5	5	1 2	N/A
August 30	Mabuhay Gardens	San Francisco, CA	USA	Kid Courage, Contraband	6	6	N/A	N/A
September 1	Mabuhay Gardens	San Francisco, CA	USA	Crime, Negative Trend, Ogden Edsel	7	7	N/A	N/A
September 2	Mabuhay Gardens	San Francisco, CA	USA	The Mutants, Yoel, The Screamers	8	8	1 2 3	N/A
September 4	Mabuhay Gardens	San Francisco, CA	USA	Dils, The Mutants	9	9	1 2 3	N/A
September 16	Mabuhay Gardens	San Francisco, CA	USA	The Dogs, Fear	10	10	1	N/A
September 22	Community Centre	San Francisco, CA	USA	Negative Trend, Savage	11	11	N/A	N/A
September 23	Aitos	Berkeley, CA	USA	The Mutants, Rad Command	12	12	1	N/A
September 23	Mabuhay Gardens	San Francisco, CA	USA	The Enemy, The Telepaths	13	13	1	N/A
September 28	Mabuhay Gardens	San Francisco, CA	USA	The Mutants, The Plugz	14	14	1	N/A
October 5	Mabuhay Gardens	San Francisco, CA	USA	The Weirdos, The Feederz	15	15	N/A	N/A
October 22	Mabuhay Gardens	San Francisco, CA	USA	The Zeros, The Young Adults	16	16	1 2	N/A
October 28	Aitos	Berkeley, CA	USA	The Young Adults, The Avengers, Sudden Fun	17	17	1 2	N/A
November 4	Mabuhay Gardens	San Francisco, CA	USA	Germs, The Red Products, The Imposters	18	18	1 2 3 4	N/A
November 22	Mabuhay Gardens	San Francisco, CA	USA	Subhumans, Blow Up, Young Canadians, Private School	19	19	1 2 3 4 5 6	N/A
November 25	Aitos	Berkeley, CA	USA	The Controllers, The Young Adults	20	20	1 2	N/A
December 1	S.F. Art Institute	San Francisco, CA	USA	The Dils	21	21	1	N/A
December 15	Mabuhay Gardens	San Francisco, CA	USA	The Offs, Zero Factor	22	22	1	N/A
December 16	330 Grove St.	San Francisco, CA	USA	The Avengers, The Mutants	23	23	1 2 3	N/A
December 19	Campolindo High School	Moraga, CA	USA	The Liars, The Zeros	24	24	N/A	N/A

== 1979 ==
Month/Day	Venue	City	Country	Other bands	Shows total	Shows this year	Flyer	Tour
January 12	New Masque	San Francisco, CA	USA	The Germs	25	1	1	N/A
January 13	New Masque	San Francisco, CA	USA	The Germs	26	2	1	N/A
January 20	La Plaza	Cotati, CA	USA	The Imposters, The Variables	27	3	N/A	N/A
January 26	The Pit	San Francisco, CA	USA	The Mutants, K.G.B.	28	4	1	N/A
February 24	Mabuhay Gardens	San Francisco, CA	USA	The VIPs, The Runz	29	5	N/A	N/A
March 3	The Deaf Club	San Francisco, CA	USA	Germs	30	6	1 2	N/A
April 6	Mabuhay Gardens	San Francisco, CA	USA	Situations, William Talon	31	7	N/A	N/A
April 7	10th Street	Berkeley, CA	USA	The Mutants, D.O.A.	32	8	1	N/A
April 19	The Temple	San Francisco, CA	USA	The Neo Boys, The Urge	33	9	1 2 3	N/A
April 20	Mills College Student Union	Oakland, CA	USA	The Queers, Negative Trend	34	10	1	N/A
April 27	Mabuhay Gardens	San Francisco, CA	USA	Germs	35	11	1	N/A
May 18	Mabuhay Gardens	San Francisco, CA	USA	Bags, Units	36	12	1 2 3	N/A
May 26	The Temple	San Francisco, CA	USA	D.O.A., The Offs, Middle Class	37	13	1	N/A
June 5	Hurrah	New York City, NY	USA	Chain Gang	38	14	1	1979 East Coast Tour
June 6	The Hot Club	Philadelphia, PA	USA	Pink Section, China Comidas	39	15	1	1979 East Coast Tour
June 7	Max's Kansas City	New York City, NY	USA	Voodoo Shoes	40	16	1	1979 East Coast Tour
June 13	The Rat	Boston, MA	USA	Chinas Cortinas	41	17	N/A	1979 East Coast Tour
June 14	Tomato	New York City, NY	USA	N/A	42	18	1	1979 East Coast Tour
June 30	The Temple	San Francisco, CA	USA	Zeros, Eaters, Bus Stop, Ready Mades, Exxploding, Pintos, Roy, Loney, Phantom Movers, Space Trash, Shashi, X-M Rhythm, Casselbury Dupres, Magic, Hyway, Fleshapoids, Ivy, X-Isles, Monica, DuPont Blues Band, Mondellos, SVT, Eye Protection, Snuky Tate	43	19	1	N/A
July 4	Mabuhay Gardens	San Francisco, CA	USA	Vs., Units	44	20	1 2	N/A
July 7	Washington Hall	Seattle, WA	USA	Ice-9	45	21	1 2	1979 Pacific Northeast Tour
July 11	The Long Goodbye	Portland, OR	USA	The Fit, Ziplocs	46 (7:00 PM)	22	1 2	1979 Pacific Northeast Tour
July 11	The Long Goodbye	Portland, OR	USA	The Fit, Ziplocs	47 (10:00 PM)	23	1 2	1979 Pacific Northeast Tour
July 12	Smilin' Buddha	Vancouver, BC	CAN	The Modernettes, Braineaters	48	24	1 2	1979 Pacific Northeast Tour
July 13	Smilin' Buddha	Vancouver, BC	CAN	The Modernettes, Braineaters	49	25	1 2	1979 Pacific Northeast Tour
July 14	Smilin' Buddha	Vancouver, BC	CAN	The Modernettes, Braineaters	50	26	1 2	1979 Pacific Northeast Tour
July 15	Vancouver East Cultural Center	Vancouver, BC	CAN	N/A	51	27	N/A	1979 Pacific Northeast Tour
July 24	Mabuhay Gardens	San Francisco	USA	The Punts, The V.I.P.s, The Rotters	52	28	1 2	N/A
July 28	The Temple	San Francisco	USA	Crime, Zeros	53	29	1 2	N/A
August 3	Bear's Lair, University of California	Berkeley, CA	USA	SVT	54	30	N/A	N/A
August 16	Hong Kong Café	Los Angeles, CA	USA	Vs.	55 (9:00 PM Show)	31	1	N/A
August 16	Hong Kong Café	Los Angeles, CA	USA	Vs.	56 (11:00 PM Show)	32	1	N/A
August 17	Hong Kong Café	Los Angeles, CA	USA	Vs.	57 (9:00 PM Show)	33	1	N/A
August 17	Hong Kong Café	Los Angeles, CA	USA	Vs.	58 (11:00 PM Show)	34	1	N/A
August 24	Mabuhay Gardens	San Francisco, CA	USA	The Go-Go's, The Penetrators	59	35	1	N/A
September 3	Mabuhay Gardens	San Francisco, CA	USA	Symptoms, Anti-Bodies, Eye Protection, Vs., Jars, Contractions, Pink Section	60	36	1 2	N/A
September 8	Mabuhay Gardens	San Francisco, CA	USA	The Silencers, Anko-Ku Botu	61	37	1	N/A
September 11	Slick Willy's	Sacramento, CA	USA	The Nervebreakers, Pressure	62	38		N/A
October 6	The Temple	San Francisco, CA	USA	Alley Cats, The Bags	63	39	1 2 3 4	N/A
October 10	Mabuhay Gardens	San Francisco, CA	USA	Black Flag, The Feederz, The Insults	64	40	1 2 3	N/A
October 19	Center for Independent Living	Berkeley, CA	USA	The Jars, The Insults	65 (7:30 PM Show)	41	1 2	N/A
October 19	Center for Independent Living	Berkeley, CA	USA	The Jars, The Insults	66 (11:00 PM Show)	42	1 2	N/A
October 21	Center for Independent Living	Berkeley, CA	USA	The Jars	67 (7:30 PM Show)	43	1	N/A
October 21	Center for Independent Living	Berkeley, CA	USA	Sudden Fun, The Tools, The Jars, C.I.A.	68 (11:00 PM Show)	44	1 2	N/A
October N/AN/A	The Squeeze	Riverside, CA	USA	Pearl Harbor and the Explosions	69	45	1	N/A
October 25	Old Waldorf	San Francisco, CA	USA	The Members	70	46	N/A	N/A
October 26	The Temple	San Francisco, CA	USA	The Offs, The Plugz	71	47	1 2	N/A
October 30	The Pauley Ballroom	Berkeley, CA	USA	The Mutants, The Zeros, Vkims, No Sisters	72	48	1 2	N/A
October 31	Mabuhay Gardens	San Francisco, CA	USA	The Next, Crime, Pearl Harbor and the Explosions	73	49	1 2	N/A
November 2	Mabuhay Gardens	San Francisco, CA	USA	Middle Class, The Urge	74	50	N/A	N/A
November 11	Whiskey A-Go-Go	Los Angeles, CA	USA	391	75	51	1 2	N/A
November 19	The Earth	Portland, OR	USA	Smegma, The Rubbers	76 (7:00 PM Show)	52	1 2 3	N/A
November 19	The Earth	Portland, OR	USA	Smegma, The Rubbers	77 (10:00 PM Show)	53	1 2 3	N/A
November 22	Legion Hall	Vancouver, BC	CAN	Subhumans, Young Canadians	78	54	N/A	N/A
November 30	Mabuhay Gardens	San Francisco, CA	USA	Madness, The Dishrags	79	55	1	N/A
December 2	Mabuhay Gardens	San Francisco, CA	USA	The Mutants, K.G.B.	80	56	1	N/A
December 7	Whiskey A-Go-Go	Los Angeles, CA	USA	Sham 69	81	57	N/A	N/A
December 8	Whiskey A-Go-Go	Los Angeles, CA	USA	Sham 69	82	58	N/A	N/A
December 15	The Temple	San Francisco, CA	USA	Buzzcocks, Pointed Sticks	83	59	1 2 3 4	N/A
December 17	Mabuhay Gardens	San Francisco, CA	USA	Push Ups, Times Five, Contractions, Room-mates	84	60	1	N/A

== 1980 ==
Month/Day	Venue	City	Country	Other bands	Shows total	Shows this year	Flyer	Tour
February 1	Mabuhay Gardens	San Francisco, CA	USA	Mutants	85	1	1	N/A
February 9	Mabuhay Gardens	San Francisco, CA	USA	8 Eyed Spy, Zey	86	2	N/A	N/A
March 7	Whiskey A-Go-Go	Los Angeles, CA	USA	Legonnaires' Disease	87	3	1 2 3a 3b	N/A
March 8	Whiskey A-Go-Go	Los Angeles, CA	USA	Wall of Voodoo	88	4	1 2 3a 3b	N/A
March 22	The Temple	San Francisco, CA	USA	Mutants, Alley Cats, Soul Rebels, No Alternative	89	5	1	N/A
March 25	Warfield Theater (The Bay Area Music Awards)	San Francisco, CA	USA	N/A	90	6		N/A
April 4	Mabuhay Gardens	San Francisco, CA	USA	No Alternative, Social Unrest	91	7		N/A
April 5	Mabuhay Gardens	San Francisco, CA	USA	Soul Rebels, VKTMS	92	8	1	N/A
April 11	S.F. Art Institute	San Francisco, CA	USA	Romeo Void, Dickheads, Ultrasheen	93	9	1	N/A
April 19	Ft. Mason, Building C	San Francisco, CA	USA	Das Block, Confession, Little Death	94	10	1	N/A
April 20	Savoy Tivoli	San Francisco, CA	USA	N/A	95	11	N/A	N/A
April 25	Barrington Hall	Berkeley, CA	USA	The Zeros, The Decadents	96	12	1	N/A
April 26	China Wagon	Sacramento, CA	USA	Flipper	98	14	1	N/A
June 7	Somona State University Commons	Rohnert Park, CA	USA	Tattooed Vegetables, Regime	99	15	N/A	N/A
June 13	Mabuhay Gardens	San Francisco, CA	USA	Subhumans, Black Flag, Doorways	100	16	1 2	N/A
June 14	Mabuhay Gardens	San Francisco, CA	USA	Bent, Subhumans, See Spot	101	17	1 2	N/A
June 20	609 South Lincoln Street	Stockton, CA	USA	F.O.C., Society Dog, Terminal Boredom	102	18	1	N/A
June 21	The Dew Drop Inn	Berkeley, CA	USA	Neutrinoz, Vs.	103	19	1 2	N/A
June 26	American Indian Center	San Francisco, CA	USA	Speedboys	104	20	1	N/A
June 27	Whiskey A-Go-Go	Los Angeles, CA	USA	Middle Class	105	21	1 1b.1 1b.2	N/A
June 28	Whiskey A-Go-Go	Los Angeles, CA	USA	BPeople	106	22	1 1b.1 1b.2	N/A
July 3	The Fleetwood	Redondo Beach, CA	USA	Chiefs, Red Cross, Stains	107	23	1 2	N/A
July 4	The Lions Club	San Diego, CA	USA	Flipper, Buffy's Ghost	108	24	1 2	N/A
July 9	Belmont Ballroom	Fresno, CA	USA	The Subtractions, The Short Order Cooks	109	25	1 2	N/A
July 12	California Hall	San Francisco, CA	USA	The Mutants, Society Dog, The Offs	110	26	1 2	N/A
August 7	The Topper Annex	Sacramento, CA	USA	Sans Figures	111	27	1	N/A
August 9	Mabuhay Gardens	San Francisco, CA	USA	Flipper, Circle Jerks	112	28	1	N/A
August 15	Santa Monica Civic	Santa Monica, CA	USA	The Cramps, X, Chelsea	113	29	1 2	N/A
August 19	Whiskey A-Go-Go	Los Angeles, CA	USA	Circle Jerks	114	30	1 2 3 4	N/A
August 23	Thatcher's	Santa Cruz, CA	USA	N/A	115	31	N/A	N/A
August 25	Mabuhay Gardens	San Francisco, CA	USA	Dirk Dirksen, Wasp Women, Ultrasheen, Zev	116	32	1	N/A
September 12	Mabuhay Gardens	San Francisco, CA	USA	Sick Kidz	117	33	N/A	N/A
September 25	Taboo	Scarborough,	ENG	U.K. Decay	118	34	N/A	1980 Europe Tour
September 26	Caird Hall	Dundee	SCT	U.K. Decay	119	35	N/A	1980 Europe Tour
September 27	Night Club	Edinburg	SCT	U.K. Decay	120	36	N/A	1980 Europe Tour
September 29	Brady's	Liverpool, MSY	ENG	U.K. Decay	121	37	1	1980 Europe Tour
September 30	The Boat Club	Nottingham, NTT	ENG	U.K. Decay	122	38	N/A	1980 Europe Tour
October 1	The Paddock	Northampton, NHM	ENG	U.K. Decay	123	39	N/A	1980 Europe Tour
October 3	The Leadmill	Sheffield, SYK	ENG	U.K. Decay	124	40	1	1980 Europe Tour
October 4	Manchester Poly	Manchester	ENG	U.K. Decay	125	41	N/A	1980 Europe Tour
October 5	King George's Hall	Blackburn, LAN	ENG	U.K. Decay	126	42	N/A	1980 Europe Tour
October 8	Music Machine	London	ENG	U.K. Decay	127	43	1 2 3 4 5	1980 Europe Tour
October 10	Lanchester Poly	Coventry, WMD	ENG	U.K. Decay	128	44	N/A	1980 Europe Tour
October 11	The Pavilion	West Runton, NFK	ENG	U.K. Decay	129	45	N/A	1980 Europe Tour
October 12	Jenkinson's	Brighton	ENG	U.K. Decay	130	46	1 2	1980 Europe Tour
October 15	Rheinterasse	Bonn, NRW	GER	N/A	131	47	N/A	1980 Europe Tour
October 16	SO36	Berlin	GER	N/A	132	48	1	1980 Europe Tour
October 17	Realschule	Rothenburg, BY	GER	N/A	133	49	1	1980 Europe Tour
October 18	Scala	Herford, NRW	GER	N/A	134	50	N/A	1980 Europe Tour
October 29	The Hayloft	San Francisco, CA	USA	N/A	135	51	1	N/A
December 12	Mabuhay Gardens	San Francisco, CA	USA	VKTMS, Wounds	136	52	1 2	N/A

== 1981 ==
Month/Day	Venue	City	Country	Other bands	Shows total	Shows this year	Flyer	Tour
March 15	Hotel Saint Claire Ballroom	San Jose, CA	USA	Social Unrest, Retorts	137	1	1 2	N/A
March 20	Mabuhay Gardens	San Francisco, CA	USA	Middle Class, Wounds	138	2	1	N/A
March 22	V.F.W. Hall	Reno, NV	USA	D.O.A., 7 Seconds, Thrusting Squirters, Section 8	139	3	1 2	N/A
April 3	Mabuhay Gardens	San Francisco, CA	USA	U.K. Decay, Fried Abortions	140	4	1 2N/A	N/A
April 4	Mabuhay Gardens	San Francisco, CA	USA	U.K. Decay, Red Rockers	141	5	1 2	N/A
April 9	The Channel	Boston, MA	USA	N/A	142	6	N/A	1981 U.S. Tour
April 10	Simon's Downtown	Pawtucket, RI	USA	The Probers, The D.C. Tenz	143	7	1	1981 U.S. Tour
April 15	9:30 Club	Washington, DC	USA	Half Japanese	144 (8:00 PM Show)	8	1 2	1981 U.S. Tour
April 15	9:30 Club	Washington, DC	USA	Half Japanese	145 (11:00 PM Show)	9	1 2	1981 U.S. Tour
April 16	The Marble Bar	Baltimore, MD	USA	Black Market Baby	146	10	1 2 3	1981 U.S. Tour
April 17	Omni's	Philadelphia, PA	USA	N/A	147	11	N/A	1981 U.S. Tour
April 18	City Gardens	Trenton, NJ	USA	Sic F*cks	148	12	1 2	1981 U.S. Tour
April 23	Zappa's	New York City, NY	USA	Xdavis	149	13	1 2	1981 U.S. Tour
April 24	Club 57	New York City, NY	USA	The Undead	150	14	1 2 3 4b	1981 U.S. Tour
April 26	Club 57	New York City, NY	USA	The Sirens	151	16	1 2 3 4b	1981 U.S. Tour
April 29	Club 57	New York City, NY	USA	Bad Brains	152	17	1 2 3 4b	1981 U.S. Tour
April 25	Club 57	New York City, NY	USA	Sic Kidz	153	15	1 2 3 4b	1981 U.S. Tour
April 30	The Rusty Nail	Sunderland, MA	USA	N/A	154	16	1 2 3	1981 U.S. Tour
May 1	Stage West	Hartford, CT	USA	Dead Fabulous	155	17	1 2	1981 U.S. Tour
May 2	Emerson College	Boston, MA	USA	N/A	156	18	N/A	1981 U.S. Tour
May 29	10th Street Hall	San Francisco, CA	USA	Circle Jerks, No Alternative, Naked Lady Wrestlers, Warzone	157	19	1 2 3 4 5 6	N/A
June 6	The Elite Club	San Francisco, CA	USA	1313, Lydia Lunch, Lockjaw	158	20	1 2 3 4	N/A
June 26	American Indian Center	San Francisco, CA	USA	Speedboys, Big Boys	159	21	1	N/A
June 28	Dwinelle Hall	Berkeley, CA	USA	Fipper, No Alternative	160	22	N/A	N/A
July 2	Mabuhay Gardens	San Francisco, CA	USA	Stains, Dicks	161	23	1	N/A
July 4	The Belmont Ballroom	Fresno, CA	USA	7 Seconds, The Fix, Capital Punishment	162	24	1	N/A
July 10	The Commodore Ballroom	Vancouver, BC	CAN	D.O.A., Toxic Reasons	163	25	1 2 3	N/A
July 12	The Showbox	Seattle, WA	USA	N/A	164	26	1	N/A
July 20	Mabuhay Gardens	San Francisco, CA	USA	Pointed Sticks	165	27	1	N/A
July 31	Mabuhay Gardens	San Francisco, CA	USA	Hüsker Dü, Toxic Reasons, Church Police	166	28	1 2 3	N/A
August 6	Mabuhay Gardens	San Francisco, CA	USA	Lewd, Crucifix	167	29	1 (Minor Threat/Youth Brigade didn't play) 2	N/A
August 24	Mabuhay Gardens	San Francisco, CA	USA	Social Unrest, Church Police, Naked Lady Wrestlers	168	30	1 2	N/A
September 4	Fairmount Hall	San Diego, CA	USA	Bad Religion, The Men of Clay	169	31	1	N/A
September 5	The Florentine Gardens	Los Angeles, CA	USA	T.S.O.L., 45 Grave	170	32	1	N/A
September 6	The Florentine Gardens	Los Angeles, CA	USA	Circle Jerks, Mission of Burma	171	33	1 2 3	N/A
September 12	The Elite Club	San Francisco, CA	USA	Non, Flipper, Meat Puppets	172	34	1 2 3	N/A
September 17	The C.O.D. Lounge	Chicago, IL	USA	Hüsker Dü, Naked Raygun, The Effigies, Strike Under	173	35	1 2 3	N/A
September 18	The C.O.D. Lounge	Chicago, IL	USA	Hüsker Dü, Naked Raygun, The Effigies, Strike Under	174	36	1 2 3	N/A
September 25	The Concert Hall	Toronto, ON	CAN	Screamin' Sam and the Problems, L'Etranger	175	37	1	N/A
September 29	Tiffany's	Glasgow	SCT	N/A	176	38	1	1981 Europe Tour
September 30	Royal Court Theater	Merseyside	ENG	N/A	177	39	N/A	1981 Europe Tour
October 1	The Mayflower	Manchester	ENG	N/A	178	40	1	1981 Europe Tour
October 2	The Imperial Cinema	Birmingham, WMD	ENG	N/A	179	41	1	1981 Europe Tour
October 4	The Lyceum	London	ENG	Anti-Nowhere League, D.O.A.	180	42	1 2 3 4	1981 Europe Tour
October 8	Much More	Rome	ITA	N/A	181	43	1	1981 Europe Tour
October 9	The Quasar	Perugia, UMB	ITA	N/A	182	44	N/A	1981 Europe Tour
October 10	Palasport	Gorizia, FVG	ITA	N/A	183	45	N/A	1981 Europe Tour
October 12	The Arena	Vienna	AUT	N/A	184	46	1	1981 Europe Tour
October 14	Tavastia Club	Helsinki	FIN	N/A	185 + 186	47 + 48	N/A	1981 Europe Tour
October 15	The Roxy	Tampere	FIN	N/A	187	49	N/A	1981 Europe Tour
October 16	Kisasuoja	Saarijarvi, KS	FIN	N/A	188	50	1	1981 Europe Tour
October 17	Underground	Stockholm	SWE	The Imps	189	51	1	1981 Europe Tour
October 19	Underground	Stockholm	SWE	The Imps	190	52	1	1981 Europe Tour
October 20	Les Bains-Douche	Paris	FRA	N/A	191	53	1	1981 Europe Tour
October 21	Les Bains-Douche	Paris	FRA	N/A	192	54	2	1981 Europe Tour
December 4	The Elite Club	San Francisco, CA	USA	N/A	193	55	1 2 3	N/A
December 14	Mabuhay Gardens	San Francisco, CA	USA	Toxic Reasons, Fried Abortions, Angst	194	56	1	N/A
December 24	Bards Apollo	Los Angeles, CA	USA	China White, Black Flag, Wasted Youth, Red Cross, CH3, The Crowd, Social Distortion, D.O.A., Circle Jerks, Shattered Faith, 45 Grave, Minutemen, T.S.O.L., Bad Religion, Saccharine Trust, Youth Gone Mad, Stains	195	57	1	N/A
December 31	The Factory	San Francisco, CA	USA	Flipper, Anti-Pasti, The Effigies, The Fix	196	58	1 2	N/A

== 1982 ==
Month/Day	Venue	City	Country	Other bands	Shows total	Shows this year	Flyer	Tour
March 6	Veterans Memorial	Walnut Creek, CA	USA	(Impatient) Youth, Half Church, Church Police	197	1	1 2	N/A
March 13	Danceland Bruce Hall	San Jose, CA	USA	N/A	198	2	N/A	N/A
March 20	The Elite Club	San Francisco, CA	USA	Bad Brains, 7 Seconds, T.S.O.L., Domino Theory	199	3	1 2 3	N/A
April 23	Veteran's Hall	Cotati, CA	USA	No Alternative, Soldiers of Fortune	200	4	1	N/A
April 28	On Broadway	San Francisco, CA	USA	M.D.C., Rebel Truth, Bad Posture	201	5	1 2 3	N/A
April 29	On Broadway	San Francisco, CA	USA	Christian Death, God, Hellations	202	6	1 2	N/A
May 7	American Legion Hall	Sacramento, CA	USA	Rebel Truth, Karnage, Square Cools	203	7	1 2 3 4	N/A
May 29	10th Street Hall	San Francisco, CA	USA	Naked Lady Wrestlers, Warzone, No Alternative	204	8	1 (C.J. didn't play)	N/A
June 11	609 South Lincoln St.	Stockton, CA	USA	The Authorities, The Frigidettes, Young Pioneers	205	9	1 2	N/A
June 22	On Broadway	San Francisco, CA	USA	Flipper, Sleepers, Bad Posture, Women of Borneo	206	10	1	N/A
June 25	On Broadway	San Francisco, CA	USA	Minor Threat, Fifth Column, Free Beer, Personality Crisis	207	11	1 2	N/A
June 26	On Broadway	San Francisco, CA	USA	Flipper, Naked Lady Wrestlers, Fang	208	12	1	N/A
July 1	Fairmont Hall	San Diego, CA	USA	Battalion of Saints, Big Boys	209	13	1	N/A
July 2	The Barn	Torrance, CA	USA	Bad Religion, Descendants	210	14	1 2 3 4 5 6 7 8 9 10	N/A
July 3	The Barn	Torrance, CA	USA	Minor Threat, M.D.C., Detonators, Zero Boys	211	15	1 2 3 4 5 6 7 8 9	N/A
July 4	Whiskey A Go-Go	Los Angeles, CA	USA	T.S.O.L., Butthole Surfers	212	16	N/A	N/A
July 15	Terminal 406/Club Banned	Baltimore, MD	USA	Scream, N/A	213	17	N/A	1982 U.S. Tour (Schedule)
July 16	The Paramount	New York City, NY	USA	D.O.A., Kraut, S.S. Decontrol, Flipper	214	18	1 2 3 4 5 6 7	1982 U.S. Tour (Schedule)
July 17	The Starlite Ballroom	Philadelphia, PA	USA	Autistic Behavior, Informed Sources, Sic Kidz	215	19	1 2 3 4	1982 U.S. Tour (Schedule)
July 18	City Gardens	Trenton, NJ	USA	Flipper, Autistic Behavior, Adrenalin	216	20	1 2 3	1982 U.S. Tour (Schedule)
July 22	G.W.U. Marvin Center	Washington, DC	USA	Government Issue, Double O, Faith	217	21	1 2 3	1982 U.S. Tour (Schedule)
July 23	Casablanca	Richmond, VA	USA	White Cross, Void, Front Line	218	22	1 2 3 4 5	1982 U.S. Tour (Schedule)
July 25	Cyclorama Building	Boston, MA	USA	S.S. Decontrol, Flipper	219	23	1 2 3 4 5	1982 U.S. Tour (Schedule)
July 26	9 Lansdowne St.	Boston, MA	USA	Freeze, The F.U.'s	220	24	N/A	1982 U.S. Tour (Schedule)
July 28	The Concert Hall	Toronto, ON	CAN	Youth Youth Youth, Young Lions	221	25	1	1982 U.S. Tour (Schedule)
July 29	Clutch Cargo's	Detroit, MI	USA	Necros, Negative Approach, Blight, The Crucifucks	222	26	1 2	1982 U.S. Tour (Schedule)
July 30	Club C.O.D.	Chicago, IL	USA	Necros, Subverts	223	27	N/A	1982 U.S. Tour (Schedule)
July 31	Club C.O.D.	Chicago, IL	USA	Toxic Reasons, Trial By Fire, Six Feet Under	234	28	1	1982 U.S. Tour (Schedule)
August 3	Top of the Hill	Milwaukee, WI	USA	Die Kreuzen, Sacred Order	235	29	1 2	1982 U.S. Tour (Schedule)
August 4	Mississippi Nights	St. Louis, MO	USA	Rude Pets, Avon Ladies	236	30	1 2 3 4	1982 U.S. Tour (Schedule)
August 5	The Beat Exchange	New Orleans, LA	USA	N/A (Possibly cancelled)	237	31	N/A	1982 U.S. Tour (Schedule)
August 6	Studio D	Dallas, TX	USA	M.D.C., Stickmen With Rayguns, The Hugh Beaumont Experience	238	32	1	1982 U.S. Tour (Schedule)
August 7	The Ritz	Austin, TX	USA	M.D.C., Dicks, The Offenders, Stains	239	33	1 2 3 4 5	1982 U.S. Tour (Schedule)
August 8	Houston Room	Austin, TX	USA	M.D.C., Dicks, The Offenders	240	34	1	1982 U.S. Tour (Schedule)
August 10	The Calderon Ballroom	Phoenix, Arizona	USA	J.F.A., The Feederz	241	35	1	1982 U.S. Tour (Schedule)
August 12	The Mercury Cafe	Denver, CO	USA	Massacre Guys	242	36	1 2	1982 U.S. Tour (Schedule)
August 13	The Indian Centre	Salt Lake City, UT	USA	Massacre Guys	243	37	1 2 3	1982 U.S. Tour (Schedule)
August 14	On Broadway	San Francisco, CA	USA	Fang, Code of Honor, Domino Theory, Mad, NBJ, Ribsy, Impatient Youth, Karnage	244	38	1	1982 U.S. Tour (Schedule)
November 17	The Warehouse	Liverpool, MSY	ENG	N/A	245	39	N/A	1982 European Tour (Schedule 1) (Schedule 2)
November 18	The Leadmill	Sheffield, SYK	ENG	N/A	246	40	1	1982 European Tour (Schedule 1) (Schedule 2)
November 19	Leeds Polytechnic	Leeds, WYK	ENG	N/A	247	41	1	1982 European Tour (Schedule 1) (Schedule 2)
November 20	Leicester University	Leicester	ENG	N/A	248	42	N/A	1982 European Tour (Schedule 1) (Schedule 2)
November 22	The Pavillion	Bath, Somerset	ENG	N/A	249	43	N/A	1982 European Tour (Schedule 1) (Schedule 2)
November 23	Brighton Polytechnic	Brighton	ENG	Peter and the Test Tube Babies	250	44	1 2 3	1982 European Tour (Schedule 1) (Schedule 2)
November 24	University Of East Anglia	Norwich, NFK	ENG	N/A	251	45	1	1982 European Tour (Schedule 1) (Schedule 2)
November 26	Central London Poly	London	ENG	N/A	252	46	N/A	1982 European Tour (Schedule 1) (Schedule 2)
November 27	Central London Poly	London	ENG	N/A	253	47	N/A	1982 European Tour (Schedule 1) (Schedule 2)
December 1	Southampton University	Southampton, HAM	ENG	Peter and the Test Tube Babies, M.D.C.	254	48	1	1982 European Tour (Schedule 1) (Schedule 2)
December 2	Brixton Ace	London	ENG	The Redskins	255	49	1 2	1982 European Tour (Schedule 1) (Schedule 2)
December 4	Volksbelang	Mechelen, AN	BEL	N/A	256	50	1 2	1982 European Tour (Schedule 1) (Schedule 2)
December 5	Paradiso	Amsterdam	NLD	N/A	257	51	1	1982 European Tour (Schedule 1) (Schedule 2)
December 6	Friedrich-Ebert-Halle	Hamburg	GER	Slime, Napalm	258	52	1	1982 European Tour (Schedule 1) (Schedule 2)
December 8	Musikpalast	Recklinghause, NRW	GER	N/A	259	53	1 2	1982 European Tour (Schedule 1) (Schedule 2)
December 9	Rotation	Hanover, NI	GER	N/A	260	54	N/A	1982 European Tour (Schedule 1) (Schedule 2)
December 10	SO36	Berlin	GER	N/A	261	55	1	1982 European Tour (Schedule 1) (Schedule 2)
December 12	Ruhrer Saal	Nurnberg, BY	GER	N/A	262	56	1	1982 European Tour (Schedule 1) (Schedule 2)
December 13	Alabama Halle	Munich, BY	GER	N/A	263	57	1	1982 European Tour (Schedule 1) (Schedule 2)
December 15	Gustav-Siegle-Haus	Stuttgart, BW	GER	N/A	264	58	N/A	1982 European Tour (Schedule 1) (Schedule 2)
December 16	Kursaal	Bad Honnef, NRW	GER	N/A	265	59	N/A	1982 European Tour (Schedule 1) (Schedule 2)
December 17	Hyde-Park	Osnabruck, NI	GER	N/A	266	60	N/A	1982 European Tour (Schedule 1) (Schedule 2)
December 19	Saltlageret	Copenhagen	DNK	A.D.S.	267	61	1	1982 European Tour (Schedule 1) (Schedule 2)
December 20	Saltlageret	Copenhagen	DNK	City-X	268	62	1	1982 European Tour (Schedule 1) (Schedule 2)

== 1983 ==
Month/Day	Venue	City	Country	Other bands	Shows total	Shows this year	Flyer	Tour
January 29	The Elite Club	San Francisco, CA	USA	Mutants, M.D.C., Toxic Reasons	269	1		N/A
February 4	Goleta Valley Community Center	Goleta, CA	USA	Flipper, Dr. Know, Toxic Reasons	270	2		N/A
February 5	Devonshire Downs	Los Angeles, CA	USA	Flipper, Youth Brigade, Lost Cause, Hated	271	3		N/A
April 11	9:30 Club	Washington, DC	USA	N/A	272	4		N/A
April 15	Ruthie's Inn	Berkeley, CA	USA	Intensified Chaos, The Authorities	273	5		N/A
April 21	W.O.W. Hall	Eugene, OR	USA	Theatre of Sheep	274	6		1983 American Heartland Tour
April 22	The Hippodrome	Seattle, WA	USA	N/A	275	7		1983 American Heartland Tour
April 23	SUB Ballroom, University of B.C.	Vancouver, BC	CAN	N/A (Minor Threat no-show)	276	8		1983 American Heartland Tour
April 25	The O.A.P. Hall	Victoria, BC	CAN	The Neos, Red Tide, Moral Lepers	277	9		1983 American Heartland Tour
April 26	La Bamba	Portland, OR	USA	Poison Idea, Smegma, 10 Minute Warning	278	10		1983 American Heartland Tour

== 1984 ==
Month/Day	Venue	City	Country	Other bands	Shows total	Shows this year	Flyer	Tour
June 16	On Broadway	San Francisco, CA	USA	Black Athletes, Freeze, Witnesses, Naked Lady Wrestlers		1	1	N/A
June 30	The Keystone	Berkeley, CA	USA	Special Forces, Dr. Know, Marginal Man		2		

== 1985 ==
Month/Day	Venue	City	Country	Other bands	Shows total	Shows this year	Flyer	Tour

== 1986 ==
Month/Day	Venue	Location	Other bands	Shows total	Shows this year	Flyer	Tour
February 16	The Stone	San Francisco, CA, USA	7 Seconds, Gang Green, Rhythm Pigs		1	N/A	N/A
February 17	The Stone	San Francisco, CA, USA	7 Seconds, Whipping Boy		2	N/A	N/A
February 21	Freeborn Hall	Davis, CA, USA	7 Seconds, Mojo Nixon, Phranc		3	1 2	N/A

(Shows + Flyers 1978-1986)

through (Shows past 1986)

== See also ==
- Dead Kennedys discography
