= Dead Kennedys =

American punk band

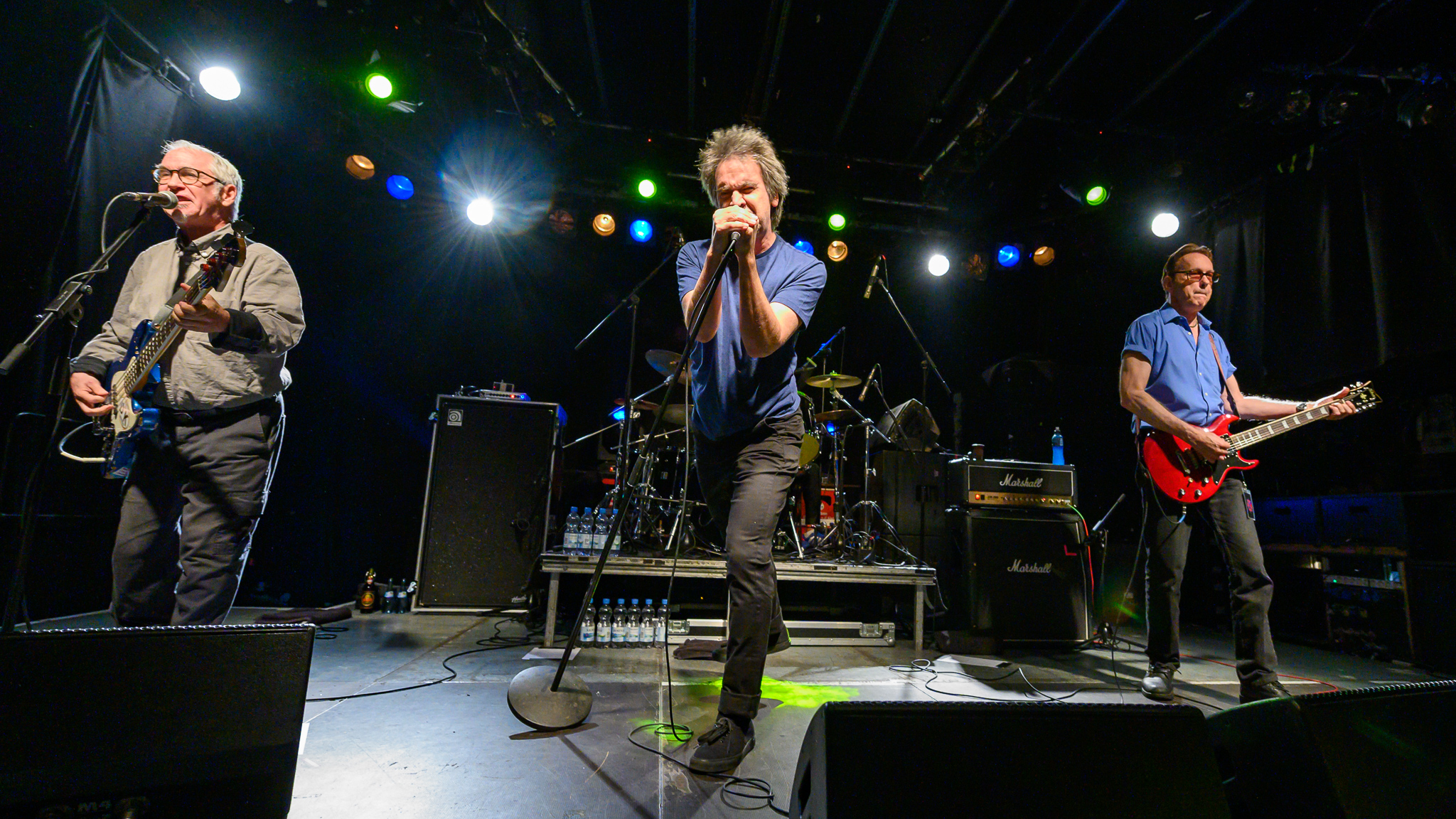
- Dead Kennedys performing in 2019

Background information
- Origin: San Francisco, California, U.S.
- Genres: Punk rock; hardcore punk
- Works: Discography; songs
- Years active: 1978–1986; 2001–present
- Labels: Cherry Red; Faulty Products; Alternative Tentacles; Manifesto/Decay
- Members: East Bay Ray; Klaus Flouride; Ron "Skip" Greer; Steve Wilson
- Past members: Jello Biafra; 6025; Ted; D. H. Peligro; Brandon Cruz; Jeff Penalty; Dave Scheff; Greg Reeves; Santi Guardiola
- Website: deadkennedys.com

Dead Kennedys are an American punk rock band that formed in San Francisco, California, in 1978. The band was one of the defining bands of the American punk scene during the band's initial eight-year run.

The band's lineup initially consisted of lead guitarist East Bay Ray, bassist Klaus Flouride, lead vocalist Jello Biafra, drummer Ted and rhythm guitarist 6025; 6025 left in 1979, and Ted left the following year after the band recorded their acclaimed first album Fresh Fruit for Rotting Vegetables (1980). The band's longest-serving drummer was D. H. Peligro, who replaced Ted in 1981 and remained until his death in 2022. Dead Kennedys recorded the EP In God We Trust Inc. (1981), followed by three more studio albums, Plastic Surgery Disasters (1982), Frankenchrist (1985), and Bedtime for Democracy (1986), the latter of which was recorded and released shortly after announcing their breakup in January 1986. Most of the band's recordings were released on Alternative Tentacles, an independent record label founded by Biafra and East Bay Ray.

Following Dead Kennedys' dissolution, Biafra continued to run Alternative Tentacles, and went on to collaborate and record with other artists, including D.O.A., NoMeansNo and his own bands Lard and the Guantanamo School of Medicine, as well as releasing several spoken word performances. In 2000 (upheld on appeal in 2003), Biafra lost an acrimonious legal case initiated by his former Dead Kennedys bandmates over songwriting credits and unpaid royalties. In 2001, the band re-formed without Biafra; various singers have since been recruited for vocal duties. Although Dead Kennedys have continued to perform over the years, they have not released any more studio albums since Bedtime for Democracy.

Dead Kennedys' lyrics were usually political in nature, satirizing political figures and authority in general, as well as popular culture and even the punk movement itself. During their initial incarnation between 1978 and 1986, they attracted considerable controversy for their provocative lyrics and artwork. Several stores refused to stock their recordings, provoking debate about censorship in rock music; in the mid-1980s, vocalist and primary lyricist Jello Biafra became an active campaigner against the Parents Music Resource Center (PMRC). This culminated in an obscenity trial between 1985 and 1986, which resulted in a hung jury and also hastened the band's demise.

== History ==
=== Formation of the band (1978–1979) ===
Dead Kennedys were formed in June 1978 in San Francisco, California, when East Bay Ray (Raymond Pepperell) advertised for bandmates in the newspaper The Recycler. The original band lineup consisted of East Bay Ray on lead guitar, Klaus Flouride (Geoffrey Lyall) on bass, Jello Biafra (Eric Reed Boucher) on vocals, Ted (Bruce Slesinger) on drums and 6025 (Carlos Cadona) on rhythm guitar. This lineup recorded their first demos. Their first live show was on July 19, 1978 at Mabuhay Gardens in San Francisco, California. They were the opening act on a bill that included DV8 and Negative Trend with The Offs headlining.

Dead Kennedys played numerous shows at local venues afterward. Due to the provocative name of the band, they sometimes played under pseudonyms, including "The DKs", "The Sharks", "The Creamsicles" and "The Pink Twinkies". San Francisco Chronicle columnist Herb Caen wrote in November 1978, "Just when you think tastelessness has reached its nadir, along comes a punk rock group called 'The Dead Kennedys', which will play at Mabuhay Gardens on Nov. 22, the 15th anniversary of John F. Kennedy's assassination." Despite mounting protests, the owner of Mabuhay declared, "I can't cancel them NOW—there's a contract. Not, apparently, the kind of contract some people have in mind." However, despite popular belief, the name was not meant to insult the Kennedy family, but according to Ray, "the assassinations were in much more poor taste than our band. We actually respect the Kennedy family. . . . When JFK was assassinated, when MLK was assassinated, when RFK was assassinated, the American Dream was assassinated. . . . Our name is actually homage to the American Dream".

6025 left the band in March 1979 under somewhat unclear circumstances, generally considered to be musical differences. In June, the band released their first single, "California Über Alles", on Biafra and East Bay Ray's independent label, Alternative Tentacles. The band followed with a poorly attended East Coast tour, being a new and fairly unknown band at the time, without a full album release.

=== Fresh Fruit for Rotting Vegetables (1980–1981) ===
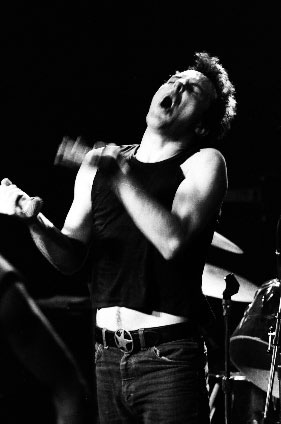
Biafra performing live

In early 1980, they recorded and released the single "Holiday in Cambodia". In June, the band recorded their debut album, Fresh Fruit for Rotting Vegetables, released in September of that year on the UK label Cherry Red. The album reached number 33 on the UK Albums Chart. Since its initial release, it has been re-released by several other labels, including IRS, Alternative Tentacles, and Cleopatra. The 2005 reissue—the special 25th-anniversary edition—features the original artwork and a bonus 55-minute DVD documenting the making of the album as well as the band's early years.

On March 25, 1980, Dead Kennedys were invited to perform at the Bay Area Music Awards in an effort to give the event some "new wave credibility", in the words of the organizers. The day of the performance was spent practicing the song they were asked to play, the underground hit "California über alles". The band became the talking point of the ceremony when after about 15 seconds into the song, Biafra stopped the band—in a manner reminiscent of Elvis Costello's Saturday Night Live appearance—and said, "Hold it! We've gotta prove that we're adults now. We're not a punk rock band, we're a new wave band." The band, all wearing white shirts with a big, black S painted on the front, pulled black ties from around the backs of their necks to form a dollar sign, then started playing a new song titled "Pull My Strings", a barbed, satirical attack on the ethics of the mainstream music industry, which contained the lyrics, "Is my cock big enough, is my brain small enough, for you to make me a star?". The song also referenced The Knack's song "My Sharona". "Pull My Strings" was never recorded for a studio release, though the performance at the Bay Area Music Awards, which was one of only two times that the song was ever performed, was released on the band's 1987 compilation album Give Me Convenience or Give Me Death. In a 2017 interview about the show Klaus stated, "We did one other performance of it at The Mabuhay and that was the only other time we performed it... like within a week of the Bammies" It’s unknown if this performance was ever recorded.

In January 1981, Ted announced that he wanted to leave to pursue a career in architecture and would help look for a replacement. He played his last concert in February 1981. His replacement was D. H. Peligro (Darren Henley). Around the same time, East Bay Ray had tried to pressure the rest of the band to sign to the major record label Polydor Records; Biafra stated that he was prepared to leave the group if the rest of the band wanted to sign to the label, though East Bay Ray asserts that he recommended against signing with Polydor. Polydor decided not to sign the band after they learned that Dead Kennedys' next single was to be entitled "Too Drunk to Fuck".

When "Too Drunk to Fuck" came out in May 1981 it caused controversy in the UK, as the BBC feared the single would reach the Top 30, which would necessitate its title being mentioned on Top of the Pops. It was never played, although it was simply called "'Too Drunk' by the Kennedys" by presenter Tony Blackburn.

=== In God We Trust, Inc., Plastic Surgery Disasters and Alternative Tentacles Records (1981–1985) ===
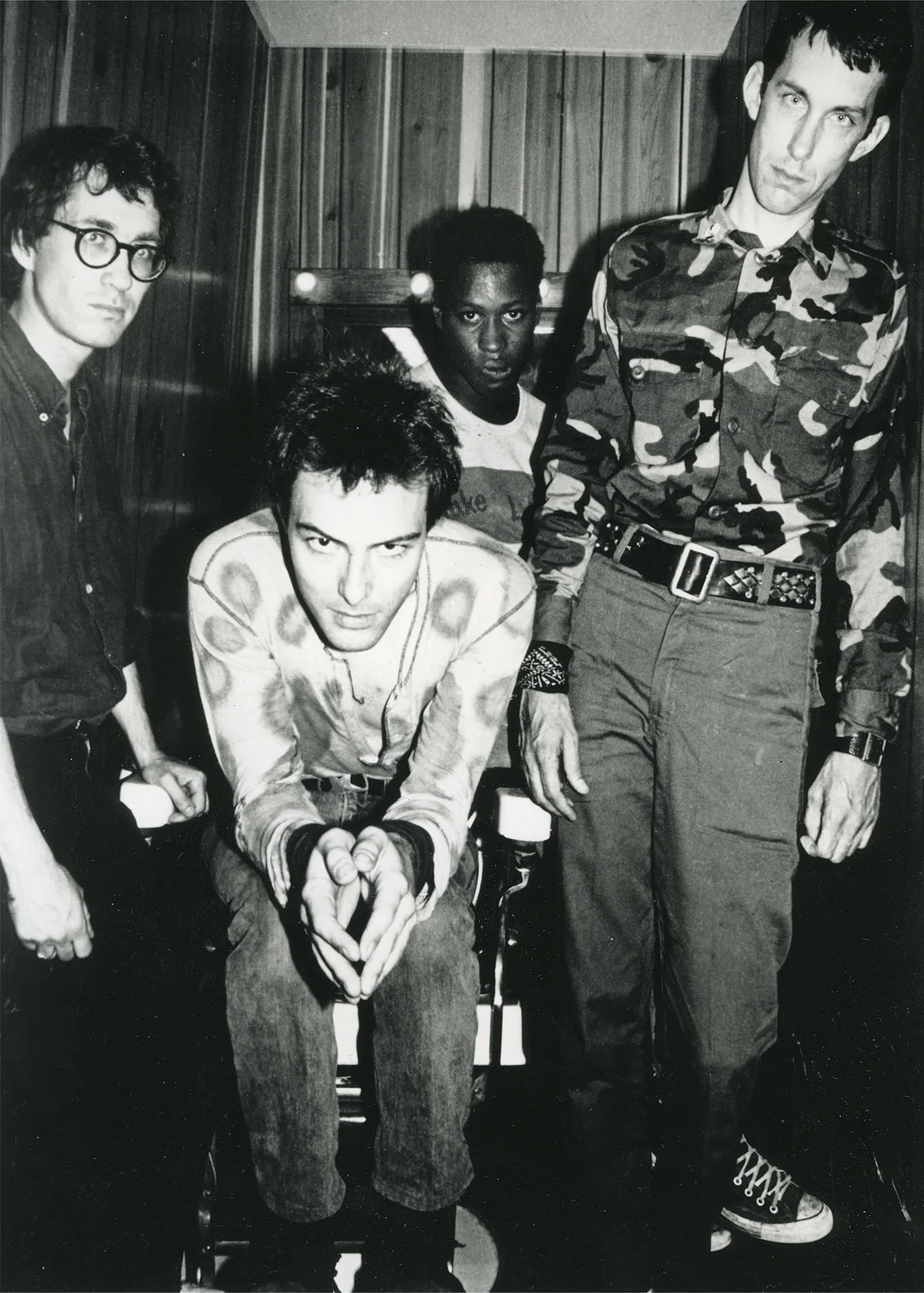
Dead Kennedys in 1983. From left: Klaus Flouride, Jello Biafra, D.H. Peligro, and East Bay Ray

After Peligro joined the band, the extended play In God We Trust, Inc. (1981) saw them move toward a more aggressive hardcore/thrash sound. In addition to the EP's controversial artwork depicting a gold Christ figure on a cross of dollar bills, the lyrics contained Biafra's most biting social and political commentary yet, and songs such as "Moral Majority", "Nazi Punks Fuck Off!" and "We've Got a Bigger Problem Now" placed Dead Kennedys as the spokesmen of social protest, while "Dog Bite", a cover version of Rawhide and various joke introductions showed a much more whimsical side. In 1982, they released their second studio album, Plastic Surgery Disasters. The album's cover features a withered starving African child's hand being held and dwarfed by a white man's hand, a picture that had won the World Press Photo award in 1980, taken in Karamoja district in Uganda by Mike Wells.

The band's music had evolved considerably in a short time, moving away from hardcore formulae toward a more innovative jazz-informed style, featuring musicianship and dynamics far beyond other bands in the genre (thus effectively removing the music from that genre). By now the group had become a de facto political force, pitting itself against rising elements of American social and political life such as the religious right, Ronald Reagan and the idle rich. The band continued touring all over the United States, as well as Europe and Australia, and gained a large underground following. While they continued to play live shows during 1983 and 1984, they took a break from releasing new records to concentrate on the Alternative Tentacles record label, which would become synonymous with DIY alternative culture. The band continued to write and perform new material during this time, which would appear on their next album (some of these early performances can be seen in the DMPO's on Broadway video, originally released by Dirk Dirksen and later reissued on Rhino).

=== Frankenchrist and obscenity trial (1985–1986) ===
The release of the album Frankenchrist in 1985 showed the band had grown in musical proficiency and lyrical maturity. While there were still a number of loud/fast songs, much of the music featured an eclectic mix of instruments including trumpets and synthesizers. Around this time Klaus Flouride released the similarly experimental solo EP Cha Cha Cha With Mr. Flouride. Lyrically, the band continued their trademark social commentary, with songs such as "MTV Get Off The Air" and "Jock-O-Rama (Invasion of the Beef Patrol)" poking fun at mainstream America.

However, the controversy that erupted over H.R. Giger's Penis Landscape, included as an insert with the album, dwarfed the notoriety of its music. The artwork caused a furor with the newly formed Parents Music Resource Center (PMRC). In December 1985 a teenage girl purchased the album at the Wherehouse Records store in Los Angeles County. The girl's mother wrote letters of complaint to the California Attorney General and to Los Angeles prosecutors. In June 1986, members of the band, along with other parties involved in the distribution of Frankenchrist, were charged criminally with distribution of harmful matter to minors. The store where the teen actually purchased the album was never named in the lawsuit. The criminal charges focused on an illustration by H.R. Giger, titled "Work 219: Landscape XX" (also known as Penis Landscape). Included as a poster with the album, Penis Landscape depicts nine copulating penises and vaginas.

Members of the band and others in the chain of distribution were charged with violating the California Penal Code on a misdemeanor charge carrying a maximum penalty of up to a year in county jail and a base fine of up to $2,000. Biafra says that during this time government agents invaded and searched his home. The prosecution tried to present the poster to the jury in isolation for consideration as obscene material, but Judge Susan Isacoff ruled that the poster must be considered along with the music and lyrics. The charges against three of the original defendants, Ruth Schwartz (owner of Mordam Records), Steve Boudreau (a distributor involved in supplying Frankenchrist to the Los Angeles Wherehouse store), and Salvatore Alberti (owner of the factory where the record was pressed), were dismissed for lack of evidence.

In August 1987, the case went to the jury with two remaining defendants: Jello Biafra and Michael Bonanno (former Alternative Tentacles label manager). However, the criminal trial ended with a hung jury, split 7 to 5 in favor of acquittal. District Attorneys Michael Guarino and Ira Riener made a motion for a retrial which was denied by Judge Isacoff, Superior Court Judge for the County of Los Angeles. The album, however, was banned from many record stores nationwide.

After the break up of the band, Jello Biafra brought up the court case on The Oprah Winfrey Show. Biafra was on the show with Tipper Gore as part of a panel discussion on the issues of "controversial music lyrics" and censorship.

=== Bedtime for Democracy and break-up (1986) ===
In addition to the obscenity lawsuit, the band became increasingly disillusioned with the underground scene as well. The hardcore scene, which had been a haven for free-thinking intellectuals and downtrodden nonconformists, was attracting a more violent audience that imposed an increasing level of brutality on other concertgoers and began to alienate many of the bands and individuals who had helped pioneer the movement in the early 1980s. In earlier years the band had criticized neo-Nazi skinheads for trying to ruin the punk scene, but just as big a problem was the popularity of increasingly macho hardcore bands, which brought the group (and their genre) an audience that had little to do with the ideas/ideals they stood for. Biafra penned new songs such as "Chickenshit Conformist" and "Anarchy for Sale" that articulated the band's feelings about the "dumbing down" of punk rock. During the summer they recorded these for their final album, Bedtime for Democracy, which was released in November. The artwork, depicting a defaced Statue of Liberty overrun with Nazis, media, opportunists, Klan members, corrupt government officials, and religious zombies, echoed the idea that neither America itself nor the punk scene were safe havens any more for "your tired, your poor, your huddled masses yearning to breathe free". The album contains a number of fast/short songs interspersed with jazz ("D.M.S.O."), spoken word ("A Commercial") and psychedelia ("Cesspools In Eden").

The band decided to split up in January 1986, prior to the recording and release of Bedtime for Democracy, and played their last live show with the original lineup on 21 February. Biafra went on to speak about his political beliefs on numerous television shows and he released a number of spoken-word albums. Ray, Flouride, and Peligro also went on to solo careers. As of 2026, it remains the band's final studio album.

=== Band re-formation and death of Peligro (2001–present) ===
In 2001, Ray, Peligro, and Flouride re-formed the Dead Kennedys, with former Dr. Know singer Brandon Cruz replacing Biafra on vocals. The band played under the name "DK Kennedys" for a few concerts, but later reverted to "Dead Kennedys" permanently. They played across the continental United States, Europe, Asia, South America, and Russia. Brandon Cruz left the band in May 2003 and was replaced by Jeff Penalty. The band has released two live albums of archival performances on Manifesto Records: Mutiny on the Bay, compiled from various live shows including a recording from their last show with Biafra in 1986, and Live at the Deaf Club, a recording of a 1979 performance at the Deaf Club in San Francisco which was greeted with more enthusiasm.

On October 9, 2007, a best of album titled Milking the Sacred Cow was released. It includes two previously unreleased live versions of "Soup Is Good Food" and "Jock-O-Rama", originally found on Frankenchrist.

Jeff Penalty left the band in March 2008 in what he describes as a "not amicable split." In a statement released, Jeff said that, following a series of disputes, the band had secretly recruited a new singer and played a gig in his neighborhood, although he also stated he was "really proud of what we were able to accomplish with Dead Kennedys". He was replaced by former Wynona Riders singer Ron "Skip" Greer. D. H. Peligro also left the band to "take some personal time off". He was replaced for a tour by Translator drummer Dave Scheff.

On August 21, 2008, the band announced an extended break from touring due to the health-related issues of Flouride and Peligro. They stated their plans to collaborate on new projects. The band performed a gig in Santa Rosa, California in June 2009, with Peligro returning to the drum kit.

In August 2010, Dead Kennedys announced plans for a short East Coast tour. The lineup assembled for this tour contained East Bay Ray, Peligro, Greer, and bassist Greg Reeves replacing Flouride, who was taking "personal time off" from the band. The tour dates included performances in Philadelphia, New York City, Boston, Washington, D.C., Portland, Maine and Hawaii. The band has played a reworked version of their song "MTV Get Off the Air", re-titled "MP3 Get Off the Web", with lyrics criticizing music piracy during their October 16, 2010, concert at the Rock and Roll Hotel in Washington, D.C.

Dead Kennedys had world tours in 2013 and in 2014, the latter mostly in North American cities. In 2015 and 2016 they toured again, including South America, where they had not played since 2001.

In 2017, East Bay Ray revealed that the band and Jello Biafra had been approached by the Punk-oriented music festival Riot Fest about a potential reunion. While Ray and the rest of the band expressed interest in the concept, Biafra refused.

On April 26, 2019, the group released DK40, a live compilation album celebrating 40 years since the band formed.

On October 28, 2022, D.H. Peligro died from an overdose of heroin and fentanyl, although it was initially believed to have been from possible head trauma from a fall at his home that day. Since Peligro's death, the band has performed in the UK with Santi Guardiola and the United States with Steve Wilson (who had played in D. H. Peligro's band Peligro before) filling in on drums.

On March 7, 2026, Jello Biafra fell at his home due to a hemorrhagic stroke from high blood pressure and was hospitalized in stable condition. He issued a statement two days later saying that "I still have a lot of great stuff in me, but right now I gotta lotta rehabbing to do."

== Conflicts between members ==
=== Royalties lawsuit ===
In the late 1990s, former band members discovered they were being underpaid in terms of royalties from Alternative Tentacles. East Bay Ray, Klaus Flouride, and D. H. Peligro claimed that Jello Biafra had conspired to pay them lower royalty rates and then attempted to disguise the precise nature of the money owed. Biafra claimed that the failure to pay these royalties was an accounting mistake.

In 1998, the other three members of the band sued Biafra over these allegedly unpaid royalties. A jury ruled in their favor in May 2000, finding Biafra and Alternative Tentacles "guilty of malice, oppression and fraud". Malice was defined for the jury as "conduct which is intended to cause injury or despicable conduct which is carried with a willful and conscious disregard for the rights of others". Biafra's appeal was denied in June 2003; he had to pay the outstanding royalties as well as punitive damages, and was forced to hand over the rights to the majority of Dead Kennedys' back catalogue to the Decay Music partnership.

This dispute caused minor waves within punk circles. Biafra claims that East Bay Ray had long expressed displeasure with Alternative Tentacles and with the amount of money he received from them, thus the original incentive for the discovery of the back payments. It was found out that Alternative Tentacles was paying Dead Kennedys less per CD than all the other bands, including Biafra himself, and not informing his other bandmates, which was the fraud. Biafra accused the band of wanting to license the famous Dead Kennedys song "Holiday in Cambodia" for use in a Levi's jeans commercial, which the band denied. However, an instrumental loop from "Holiday in Cambodia" was part of the 1981 black comedy feature film Neighbors, though it was not included on the soundtrack. The band maintains that the Levi's story was completely fictitious and invented by Biafra to discredit them.

=== Disputes over new commercial activities ===
Matters were stirred up even further when the three bandmates invited Jello Biafra to "bury the hatchet" in the form of a band reunion. Jello Biafra felt it was unprofessional because no one contacted him directly. In addition, Biafra was dismissive of the reunion, and having long expressed his disdain for nostalgia and rock reunion/oldies tours in particular, argued that the whole affair was motivated by greed.

Several DVDs, re-issues, and live albums have been released since the departure of Biafra most recently on Manifesto Records. According to Biafra, the live albums are "cash-ins" on Dead Kennedys' name and his music. Biafra also accused the releases of the new live material of having poor sound quality. Furthermore, he has stated he is not receiving any royalties from the sale of any Manifesto Records releases. Consequently, he has discouraged fans from buying any Dead Kennedy reissues. The other band members denied Biafra's accusations regarding the live releases, and have defended the mixes as an effort of hard work. Biafra dismissed the new group as "the world's greediest karaoke band." Nevertheless, in 2003, Klaus Flouride said of performances without the band's former frontman: "There hasn't been a show yet that people didn't really like."

Biafra further criticized them for advertising shows using his own image taken from the original 1980s incarnation of the band, which he labeled as false advertising. He attacked the re-formed Dead Kennedys in a song called "Those Dumb Punk Kids (Will Buy Anything)", which appears on his second collaboration with sludge metal band the Melvins, Sieg Howdy!

Biafra told an audience at a speaking gig in Trenton, New Jersey, that the remaining Dead Kennedys have licensed their single "Too Drunk to Fuck" to be used in a rape scene in a Robert Rodriguez movie. The reference is to a lounge cover of the song, recorded by the band Nouvelle Vague, played during a scene in the Planet Terror segment of Grindhouse, although no rape takes place, and in fact the would-be rapist is killed by the would-be victim. The scene in Planet Terror has would-be rapist, "Rapist No. 1" (Quentin Tarantino) order one-legged stripper "Cherry Darlin" (Rose McGowan) to get up off the floor and dance. At this point Tarantino hits play on a cassette recorder and Nouvelle Vague's cover of "Too Drunk To Fuck" plays. Biafra, disapproving of the situation, later wrote, "This is their lowest point since Levi's... This goes against everything the Dead Kennedys stands for in spades... The terrified woman later 'wins' by killing Tarantino, but that excuse does not rescue this at all. I wrote every note of that song and this is not what it was meant for.... Some people will do anything for money. I can't help but think back to how prudish Klaus Flouride was when he objected to H. R. Giger's painting on the "Frankenchrist" (sic) poster, saying he couldn't bear to show it to his parents. I'd sure love to be a fly on the wall when he tries to explain putting a song in a rape scene for money to his teenage daughter... The deal was pushed through by a new business manager the other three hired."

The re-formed Dead Kennedys followed their court victory by releasing reissues of all Dead Kennedys albums (except Fresh Fruit for Rotting Vegetables, to which they did not have the rights until 2005), releasing several new archival concert DVDs, and licensing several songs to The Manchurian Candidate remake and the Tony Hawk's Pro Skater video game. East Bay Ray claims he received a fax from Alternative Tentacles purporting Biafra approved the licensing for the game.

The band claims on their website that they still pay close attention to an anti-corporate ideology, despite performing on September 5, 2003, at a festival in Turkey that was sponsored by Coca-Cola, noting that they have since pulled out of a show in Los Angeles when they found that it was being sponsored by Coors. However, Biafra claims the previous licensing deals prove otherwise.

Biafra, in a 2012 interview with the Tampa Bay Times, stated he was not happy with the current direction of his former bandmates, nor did he want to restart the Dead Kennedys for nostalgia purposes:

We haven't talked in a dozen years. In their hearts they've become Republicans and I just wouldn't do something like that unless we can bring back the real thing. In a way getting me back into the band would be their worst nightmare, like make them rehearse. When people tell me that I owe it to the fans to regurgitate nothing but old music with the people I used to play with, that's totally the opposite of what punk and Dead Kennedys means to me. The true spirit of the whole thing is to keep going, keep moving and make more new stuff. Nobody was more cynical than the original punks about nostalgia and retro because of all the rage on TV and people started to get nostalgic in goofy ass ways for the sixties and they were thinking, "Yeah, that will never happen to us." That's not what I'm here for, sorry. It's not as if the people who come to the Guantanamo School of Medicine shows wanting nothing but old Dead Kennedys songs don't leave with a smile on their face once they've heard the new songs. It's not like I've forgot how to write this shit.

In a May 2025 interview with Guitar World, East Bay Ray said that he and Klaus Fluoride were open to a reunion with Biafra, but that it would never happen and that Biafra was to blame. He said that over the years lucrative offers such as one in 2017 from Riot Fest were proposed to the band but Biafra was against it. He stated, "It’s not an issue for me or Klaus. It’s Biafra that turns down any offers for us to do something; we don’t have any problem." Ray critiqued Biafra's career after leaving the band and disputed any claim that Biafra wrote most or all of the band's music, feeling that Biafra had not succeeded enough on his own to prove he could have done so:

We actually wrote as a band, where in effect, due to the chemistry between us, it was a case of two and two equaling five. None of us has had a solo career that was bigger than Dead Kennedys, which, to me, shows the power of a bunch of talented people getting together and creating something that was far greater than the sum of its parts. Jello didn’t bring in the songs. I know he’s created the myth that he wrote them all, but the question here is that if he did, why didn’t he ever do anything significant after leaving the band? [...] Iggy left the Stooges and had a career; ditto Lou Reed with the Velvet Underground or Morrissey with the Smiths. Where’s Biafra’s solo career with a bunch of great songs? The songs were written in numerous different ways. 'Holiday in Cambodia' started as a jam in the rehearsal studio.

== Artistry ==
=== Music and lyrics ===
Dead Kennedys have been described as one of the first hardcore punk bands. They were noted for the harshness of their lyrics, which generally combined biting social satire while expressing a staunchly left-wing view of contemporary America. Unlike other leftist punk bands who use more direct sloganeering, Dead Kennedys' lyrics were often snide. For example, "Holiday in Cambodia" is a multi-layered satire targeting both yuppies and Cambodia's recently deposed Khmer Rouge regime. Or, on "Jock-O-Rama", featured on Frankenchrist, they mock southern small towns whose residents’ lives revolve around high school football.

=== Logo ===
"DK" logo

The original logo was created by Winston Smith. He later contributed artwork for the covers of In God We Trust, Inc., Plastic Surgery Disasters, Frankenchrist, Bedtime for Democracy, Give Me Convenience or Give Me Death, the back cover of the "Kill the Poor" single and the Alternative Tentacles logo. When asked about the "DK" logo in an interview, Jello Biafra explained, "...I wanted to make sure it was something simple and easy to spray-paint so people would graffiti it all over the place, and then I showed it to Winston Smith. He played around with it, came back with a bunch of designs that had the circle and slightly 3-D looking letters and he had ones with different patterns behind it. I liked the one with bricks, but ultimately I thought simple red behind it was the boldest and the best."

=== Influence ===
Dead Kennedys have influenced multiple acts such as System of a Down, Green Day, Faith No More, Rage Against the Machine, Sepultura, Descendents, Bad Religion, Slayer, X, Minutemen, The Hives, Saves the Day and Screeching Weasel among others.

== Members ==
Current members

- East Bay Ray (Raymond Pepperell) – guitars (1978–1986, 2001–present)
- Klaus Flouride (Geoffrey Lyall) – bass, backing vocals (1978–1986, 2001–2010, 2011–present)
- Ron "Skip" Greer – lead vocals (2008–present)
- Steve Wilson – drums, backing vocals (2023–present)

Former members

- Jello Biafra (Eric Boucher) – lead vocals (1978–1986)
- 6025 (Carlo Cadona) – rhythm guitar (1978–1979)
- Ted (Bruce Slesinger) – drums (1978–1981)
- D.H. Peligro (Darren Henley) – drums, backing vocals (1981–1986, 2001–2008, 2009–2022; his death)
- Brandon Cruz – lead vocals (2001–2003)
- Jeff Penalty (Jeff Alulis) – lead vocals (2003–2008)
- Santi Guardiola – drums (2023)

Touring members

- Dave Scheff – drums (2008)
- Greg Reeves – bass (2010–2011)

== Discography ==
- Fresh Fruit for Rotting Vegetables (1980)
- Plastic Surgery Disasters (1982)
- Frankenchrist (1985)
- Bedtime for Democracy (1986)

== Videography ==
- The Art of Punk – Dead Kennedys (The Museum of Contemporary Art) (2013) - Documentary featuring the art of Winston Smith

== See also ==
- List of Dead Kennedys live performances
- List of bands from the San Francisco Bay Area
- Ronald Reagan in music
