= Bedtime for Democracy =

Studio album by Dead Kennedys
- Released: November 1986
- Recorded: April and July 1986
- Studios: City Sound and Hyde St.
- Genre: Hardcore punk
- Length: 48:29
- Label: Alternative Tentacles
- Producer: Jello Biafra

Dead Kennedys chronology
Frankenchrist (1985)	Bedtime for Democracy (1986)	Give Me Convenience or Give Me Death (1987)

Professional ratings
Review scores
Source	Rating
AllMusic	3/5 stars
NME	3/5 stars
Spin Alternative Record Guide	4/10

Bedtime for Democracy is the fourth and final studio album by American punk rock band Dead Kennedys. Released in 1986, songs on this album cover common punk subjects often found in punk rock lyrics of the era such as conformity, Reaganomics, the U.S. military, and critique of the hardcore punk movement. The album's title refers to the 1951 comedy film Bedtime for Bonzo, starring Ronald Reagan, and also reflects the band's weary bitterness from the trial they were undergoing at the time over the controversial art included with their previous album. By the time recording of Bedtime for Democracy had begun, the Dead Kennedys had already played what would be their last concert with Jello Biafra and announced their breakup immediately after the release of the record, whose opening track is a cover of David Allan Coe's "Take This Job and Shove It."

== Track listing ==
All tracks are written by Jello Biafra, except when stated.

No.	Title	Writer(s)	Length
1.	"Take This Job and Shove It"	David Allan Coe	1:25
2.	"Hop with the Jet Set"		2:05
3.	"Dear Abby"		1:09
4.	"Rambozo the Clown"		2:25
5.	"Fleshdunce"		1:29
6.	"The Great Wall"		1:32
7.	"Shrink"		1:44
8.	"Triumph of the Swill"		2:17
9.	"Macho Insecurity"		1:30
10.	"I Spy"	D.H. Peligro	2:30
11.	"Cesspools in Eden"	Dead Kennedys	5:56
12.	"One-Way Ticket to Pluto"		1:38
13.	"Do the Slag"	East Bay Ray	1:36
14.	"A Commercial"		1:33
15.	"Gone with My Wind"		1:43
16.	"Anarchy for Sale"		1:18
17.	"Chickenshit Conformist"		5:58
18.	"Where Do Ya Draw the Line"		2:39
19.	"Potshot Heard 'Round the World"	Biafra, Ray	2:10
20.	"D.M.S.O."	Dead Kennedys	2:09
21.	"Lie Detector"	Biafra, Ray	3:43
Total length:			48:29

== Personnel ==
Dead Kennedys

- Jello Biafra - lead vocals, producer, mixer
- East Bay Ray - guitar
- Klaus Flouride - bass, backing vocals
- D.H. Peligro - drums, backing vocals

Additional performers

- Tim Jones - synthesizer on "One-Way Ticket to Pluto"
- Jayed Scotti - timbales on "Dear Abby"
- Cal - backing vocals on "Fleshdunce", "Where Do Ya Draw The Line?" and "Chickenshit Conformist"
- Andrew - backing vocals on "Fleshdunce", "Where Do Ya Draw The Line?" and "Chickenshit Conformist"
- Blaze - backing vocals on "Fleshdunce", "Where Do Ya Draw The Line?" and "Chickenshit Conformist"
- P. O'Pillage - the voice of Rambozo on "Rambozo The Clown", artwork

Production

- John Cuniberti - engineer, mixer
- Winston Smith - artwork

== Charts ==
Chart (1986)	Peak position
UK Independent Albums (OCC)	1

== Certifications ==
Region	Certification	Certified units/sales
United Kingdom (BPI)	Silver	60,000^{^}
^{^} Shipments figures based on certification alone.

== Related ==
The East Bay punk band Isocracy parodied the name in their 1988 EP, Bedtime for Isocracy. The cover art depicted the band together in a bed, accompanied by Jello Biafra. After the record's release, Isocracy split up, with two members forming the group Samiam and another joining Green Day.
