= Skip Greer =

Vocalist for US hardcore punk band Dead Kennedys

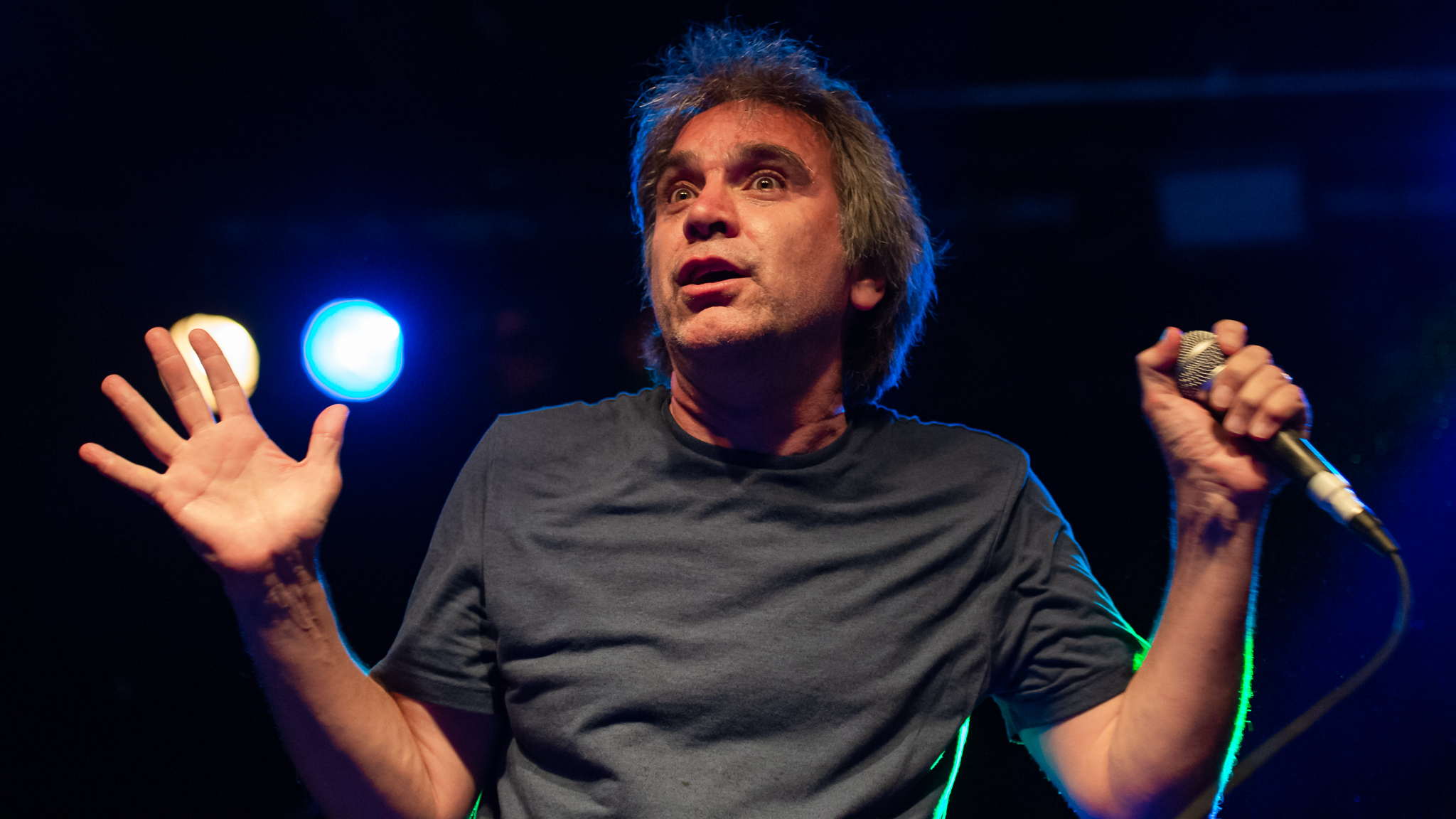
- Greer in 2019

Background information
- Also known as: Skip McSkipster
- Born: Ronald Greer
- Genres: Garage, punk
- Years active: 1992–present

Ronald "Skip" Greer is the lead vocalist for the Dead Kennedys. Greer joined the band in 2008, replacing Jeff Penalty, and is the band's longest-serving vocalist. He was a founding member of and vocalist for the Wynona Riders from 1992 through 1996 and has also performed with East Bay Ray and the Killer Smiles and the Lightouts.

Greer is known for being a high-energy performer and being physically interactive with the audience. Greer's songwriting style has been called "more poetic" than that of his DK predecessor, though he has only written songs for the Killer Smiles. DK bassist Klaus Flouride has said this was what the band was looking for, saying "Skip is a good singer, a good performer, but he doesn't do Biafra."
