= Frankenchrist =

1985 album by Dead Kennedys

Studio album by Dead Kennedys
- Released: October 1985
- Recorded: May and July 1985
- Studios: Hyde St. Studios, San Francisco
- Genres: Punk rock; post-punk; hardcore punk
- Length: 45:12
- Label: Alternative Tentacles
- Producer: Jello Biafra

Dead Kennedys chronology
Plastic Surgery Disasters (1982)	Frankenchrist (1985)	Bedtime for Democracy (1986)

Frankenchrist is the third full-length album by the American hardcore punk band Dead Kennedys, released in 1985 on Alternative Tentacles.

The album is an example of the progressive, psychedelic side of Dead Kennedys' musical personality. The spaghetti Western soundtrack influence is noticeable in the horn parts and in East Bay Ray's guitar work. Frankenchrist is also noted for its relative lack of traditionally "hardcore" material, with most of the tracks being slower and longer than the majority of other Dead Kennedys songs. "M.T.V. − Get off the Air" is notable for its pointed attack on the music establishment and "Stars and Stripes of Corruption" for its exegesis of vocalist Jello Biafra's political philosophies.

== Inspiration ==
Biafra said, "One of the main focal points of Frankenchrist is if we are going to rise above the need for cops and laws, we can quit using the old American work ethic of seeing how much you can get away with and how much you can scam and who cares whose back you stab."

== Controversies ==
=== "Landscape #XX" ===
The album was a subject of controversy because the original record sleeve included a poster featuring the painting Landscape #XX, or Penis Landscape, by H. R. Giger, depicting rows of copulating penises and vulvae. The choice of the painting came as the result of a comment by Jello Biafra to his then-roommate and Dead Kennedys artist, Jayed Scotti, art partner of Winston Smith. Biafra showed Scotti a copy of Omni magazine showing several works of art by Giger, including "Penis Landscape", printed in 1977, for a Paris art collection. Biafra said he wanted to use the piece on the upcoming album cover. Scotti phoned New York agent Les Barany and explained the project. Barany contacted Giger to ask permission, then contacted Mike Bonanno of Alternative Tentacles Records; Giger agreed to let the label use a reproduction chrome of the artwork for $600, half the usual price. Biafra presented the idea to the other members of the band, but the idea was rejected as the album cover and as an interior gatefold double LP album. Finally it was accepted as an inserted poster. Jayed Scotti created the production mechanicals by hand for the poster. The poster was printed and inserted in the Frankenchrist album with an additional sticker on the outside shrinkwrap, warning buyers of the contents.

Biafra was brought to trial for distributing harmful matter to minors, and though the case did not result in a conviction, Alternative Tentacles was almost driven to bankruptcy. It was only through the support of fans that the label was able to stay alive. Biafra gained attention as a champion of free speech, and was subsequently one of the most active opponents of the Parents Music Resource Center.

=== Shriners ===
Frankenchrist's front cover itself depicts a Shriners parade, featuring Shriners members driving miniature cars, wearing their distinctive red fez hats. The four Shriners members pictured in the photograph sued Dead Kennedys in 1986. The image was originally photographed and published by Newsweek in the 1970s, a decade before the Frankenchrist usage by Dead Kennedys and Alternative Tentacles in 1985.

== Critical reception ==
Professional ratings
Review scores
Source	Rating
AllMusic	3.5/5 stars
The Encyclopedia of Popular Music	3/5 stars
MusicHound Rock: The Essential Album Guide	2.5/5 stars
The Rolling Stone Album Guide	3/5 stars
Spin Alternative Record Guide	5/10

Trouser Press wrote: "There are some bad tracks with forced, awkward lyrics, but the LP does contain two of the DKs’ finest moments: 'MTV — Get Off the Air' and 'Stars and Stripes of Corruption', one of the most powerful political statements ever committed to vinyl."

Byron Coley at Spin said the album was, "organically interchangeable with any other like-sized hunk they've previously coughed up. It would be unjust, though, not to mention that the band sounds better than ever. Unfortunately, this band’s instrumental sound must forever take a backseat to the wormy vocal histrionics of Mr. Jello Biafra."

== Track listing ==
All tracks are written by Dead Kennedys, except where stated.

Side A
No.	Title	Writer(s)	Length
1.	"Soup Is Good Food"		4:18
2.	"Hellnation"	D.H. Peligro	2:22
3.	"This Could Be Anywhere (This Could Be Everywhere)"		5:24
4.	"A Growing Boy Needs His Lunch"		5:50
5.	"Chicken Farm"		5:06
Total length:			23:00

Side B
No.	Title	Writer(s)	Length
6.	"Jock-O-Rama (Invasion of the Beef Patrol)"	Jello Biafra	4:06
7.	"Goons of Hazzard"	Biafra, East Bay Ray	4:25
8.	"M.T.V. Get off the Air"	Biafra	3:37
9.	"At My Job"	Ray	3:41
10.	"Stars and Stripes of Corruption"		6:23
Total length:			22:12 (45:12)

== Personnel ==
Dead Kennedys

- Jello Biafra – lead vocals, producer, mixer
- East Bay Ray – electric/acoustic guitar, synthesizer
- Klaus Flouride – bass, backing vocals
- D.H. Peligro – drums, backing vocals

Additional performers

- John Leib – trumpet on "MTV Get Off The Air"
- Tim Jones – keyboards on "A Growing Boy Needs His Lunch"
- Nina T.R. Stapleton – backing vocals on "Jock-O-Rama"
- Laura T.R. Muetz – backing vocals on "Jock-O-Rama"
- Julie Hoffman – backing vocals on "Jock-O-Rama"
- Susan Caldwell – backing vocals on "Jock-O-Rama"
- Danielle Dunlap – backing vocals on "Jock-O-Rama"
- Robyn Lutz – backing vocals on "Jock-O-Rama"
- Kris Carleson – backing vocals on "Jock-O-Rama"
- Steve DePace – backing vocals on "At My Job"
- Wild Bill – backing vocals on "At My Job"
- Sweet – backing vocals on "At My Job"
- Wee Willy Lipat – backing vocals on "At My Job"
- Microwave – backing vocals on "At My Job"
- Gary Floyd – backing vocals on "Chicken Farm" and "Stars and Stripes of Corruption"
- Eugene Robinson – backing vocals on "Chicken Farm" and "Stars and Stripes of Corruption"
- Jeff Davis – backing vocals on "Chicken Farm" and "Stars and Stripes of Corruption"

Production

- John Cuniberti – engineer, mixer
- Winston Smith – artwork

== Charts ==
Chart (1985)	Peak position
UK Independent Albums (OCC)	1

== Certifications ==
Region	Certification	Certified units/sales
United Kingdom (BPI)	Silver	60,000^{^}
^{^} Shipments figures based on certification alone.
