= Jeff Penalty =

American musician

- Jeff Penalty performing with The Dead Kennedys in 2006

Background information
- Born: Jeff Alulis
- Origin: Broomall, Pennsylvania, U.S.
- Genres: Punk rock, hardcore punk

Jeff Alulis, known professionally as Jeff Penalty, is a writer, filmmaker, and musician, known mainly for his documentary work and his position as a former lead singer of Dead Kennedys.

== Early life and education ==
Penalty was born and raised in Broomall, Pennsylvania. He attended college at the University of Massachusetts-Amherst, where he was a member of the fencing team and attended graduate school at the University of Southern California, where he earned an MFA in Writing for Screen and Television and fenced on the Men's Épée team.

== Career ==
=== Music ===
Penalty's musical background was mostly as a drummer, performing temporarily with the Pennsylvania band Ralphus and the glam metal parody band Vaz Hoil. He also played drums with Sidekick and The Eyeliners on one occasion each. He shared vocal duties in the Massachusetts pop punk act Just About Done and sang for a short-lived California band called Stupid Ferrets.

In 2003, Penalty became the vocalist for Dead Kennedys, replacing Dr. Know's Brandon Cruz, who was with the band for two years following their reformation without original vocalist Jello Biafra. Penalty had a fascination with Dead Kennedys ever since he listened to their debut album, Fresh Fruit for Rotting Vegetables. He said singing for Dead Kennedys was "the realization of a dream I never even dared to have." Joining the band at twenty-five, he was considerably younger than his former bandmates. After performing over 50 shows with Dead Kennedys, in March 2008 Penalty announced he was parting ways with the band.

Penalty has since filled in on drums with pop-punk band The Dollyrots for tours of Canada and California, and on vocals for Reagan Youth for tours of California and Texas.

=== Film and television ===
Penalty (under his given name, Jeff Alulis) directed and co-produced (along with Ryan Harlin of Techno Squirrels) Do You Remember? Fifteen Years Of The Bouncing Souls, which won the Best Documentary Feature award at the 2003 D.I.Y. Film Festival in Los Angeles. Alulis and Harlin have since gone on to direct/produce the documentary feature Let Them Know: The Story of Youth Brigade and BYO Records, which was an Official Selection at the 2009 San Francisco Independent Film Festival.

From 2006 through 2007, Alulis and Harlin traveled around the world with NOFX filming a tour documentary that later became the series NOFX: Backstage Passport on Fuse TV. Alulis and Harlin served as directors, camera operators, and executive producers on the show, which premiered at the 2008 SXSW Film Festival and aired on Fuse TV in the spring of that year. It was released as a double DVD set with two hours of bonus footage by Fat Wreck Chords on March 17, 2009.

Alulis and Harlin also directed/produced NOFX: Backstage Passport 2, a feature-length follow-up documentary filmed between 2009 and 2012 as NOFX returned to several South American countries where concerts had been canceled during the original "Backstage Passport" tour. It was released by Fat Wreck Chords on August 21, 2015, and won "Best Music Documentary" at both the Kingston Film Festival and the Oregon Independent Film Festival.

=== Writing ===
Penalty, as Alulis, was the writer for NOFX's official autobiography, NOFX: The Hepatitis Bathtub and Other Stories, published by Da Capo Press on April 12, 2016. The book reached number 9 on the New York Times bestseller list for paperback nonfiction two weeks after it was released. He was a featured author at the first It's Not Dead Festival in 2015.

On October 12, 2021, The Doors guitarist Robby Krieger released a memoir Set the Night on Fire: Living, Dying, and Playing Guitar With the Doors, which was cowritten with Alulis.

== Personal life ==
As of 2016, he resides in Los Angeles, CA.

== In popular culture ==
Franz Nicolay (most famed as keyboard player of The Hold Steady) has recorded a song "Jeff Penalty" for his third solo album, Major General, previously appearing on the demo "The Black Rose Paladins". The song refers to a Dead Kennedys performance at Irving Plaza in New York City, at which Nicolay performed with the World/Inferno Friendship Society as an opening act, and the growth in appreciation by an initially cynical crowd.
