= Klaus Flouride =

American musician

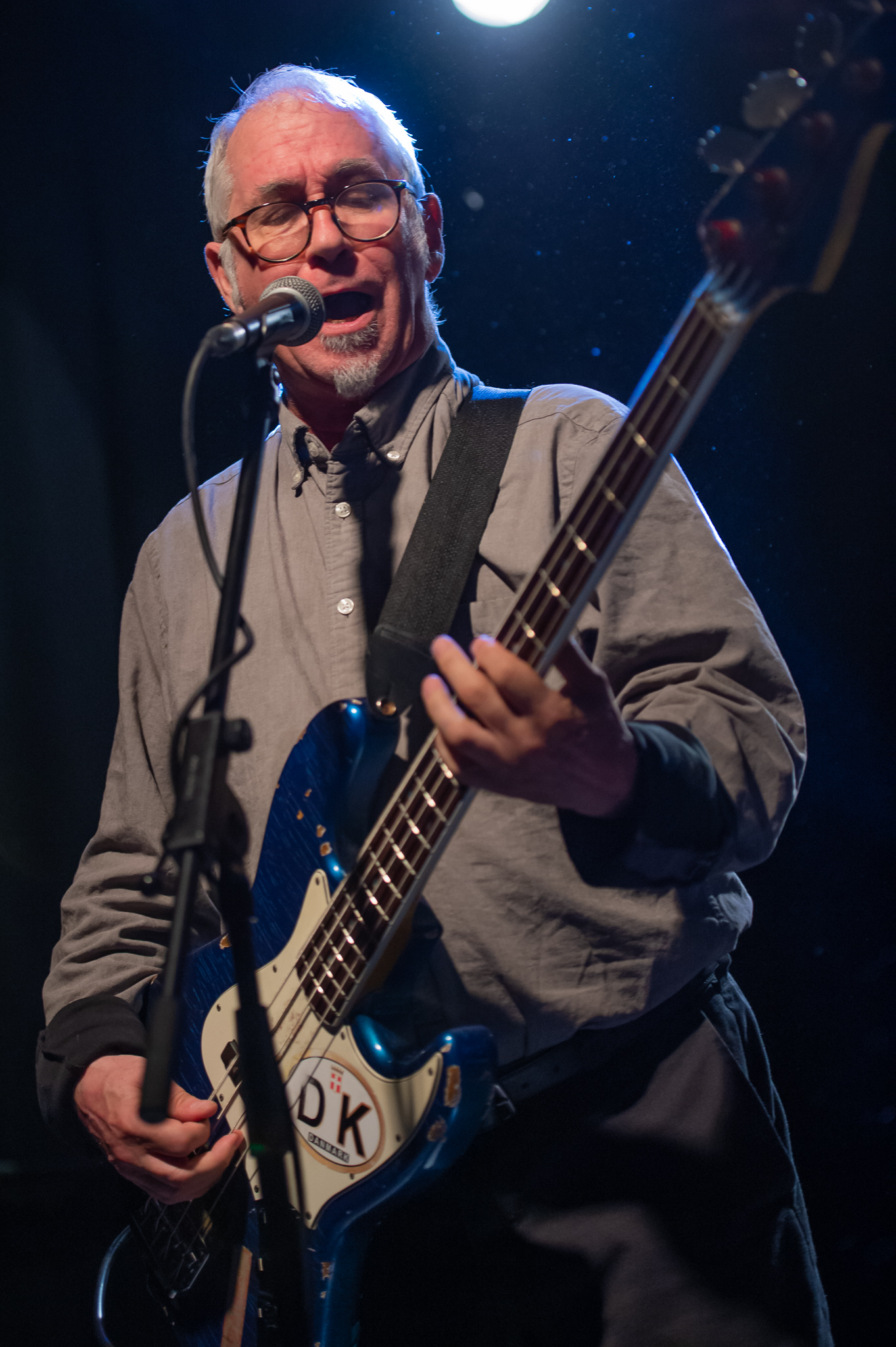

Background information
- Born: Geoffrey Lyall; May 30, 1949 (age 77); Detroit, Michigan, U.S.
- Instruments: Bass, vocals
- Years active: 1967–present
- Label: Alternative Tentacles

Geoffrey Lyall (born May 30, 1949), known by the stage name Klaus Flouride, is an American musician who is the bassist and backing vocalist for the San Francisco punk rock band Dead Kennedys.

== Early life ==
Lyall was born in Detroit, Michigan to Bryce Lyall and Louise Robbins Lyall. As a child, he was fascinated by records, and the music hidden in their grooves and started collecting records at age seven. During the Great Depression, his father had played saxophone and banjo in New Orleans speakeasys, and from an early age he had access to his parents' wide-ranging record collection. His older brother and sister began introducing him to rock when they were in middle and high school, with his brother introducing him to Elvis Presley, his sister introducing him to Little Richard, and both introducing him to Jerry Lee Lewis. At age 8, after seeing Buddy Holly on the Ed Sullivan Show, his parents bought him his first Stella guitar after his continuous insistence. He started learning to read music, but the guitar was unmanageable for his small hands. His guitar teacher declared to his parents that he would never learn to play. At age 13, he moved to a Gibson and started another serious attempt at learning to play it. At age 14, he formed his first band, a surf group called The Woodsmen; his first real band was The Liberators.

== Career ==
Lyall moved to Boston in 1967, where he bought his first bass to play in a power trio named Thursday Parade. He briefly played with singer Billy Squier in Magic Terry & The Universe. He moved between Boston and New York City for the next few years, playing concerts ranging from solo performances to R&B and blues bands.

He became involved in punk rock after moving to San Francisco in 1977 and spending time at the Mabuhay Gardens. He joined Dead Kennedys after answering East Bay Ray's ad in a local music magazine, and began to call himself Klaus Flouride. He played on all their records, and co-wrote many of their songs.

Flouride began working on a solo album following the release of Dead Kennedys' second album, 1982's Plastic Surgery Disasters, coming out with the 12" single "Shortnin' Bread" (with "The Drowning Cowboy" as the B-Side) in 1982 and the EP Cha Cha Cha With Mr. Flouride in 1985.

After Dead Kennedys broke up in 1986, Flouride concentrated on his solo career, releasing Because I Say So in 1988 and The Light Is Flickering in 1991, the latter album including the song "Dancing with Shauna Grant".

Flouride also works in the studio as a producer and mixer and has done projects with many artists including the Hi-Fives.

In 2001, Flouride reunited with Ray and D. H. Peligro under the Dead Kennedys name.

== Equipment ==
Klaus Flouride played a Lake Placid Blue Fender Jazz Bass from 1966 that he purchased for $200; this was his main bass guitar during his years with the Dead Kennedys. However, in March 2013 the bass was stolen in Brazil; Flouride believes that the airlines lost it. Luthier Tony Schroom built Flouride a new instrument complete with the same stickers and scratches of the old one. He has also played with a Fender Bass VI, particularly on the Bedtime for Democracy album.

Flouride used "an Acoustic 150b amp, and an Acoustic 402 cabinet with stock speakers at least thru 'In God We Trust'", before getting a Traynor Mono Block B amp to replace the Acoustic head. He primarily uses a Gallien Krueger MB 500 and an Ampeg SVT cabinet when he is on tour. According to a recent post on Flouride's website, he uses a Boss Blues Driver and a Boss TU-2 tuner pedal. Flouride also played clarinet on the DK song Terminal Preppie.

== Solo discography ==
=== Albums ===
- Cha Cha Cha With Mr. Flouride (1985), Alternative Tentacles
- Because I Say So (1988), Alternative Tentacles
- The Light Is Flickering (1991), Alternative Tentacles
- Flouride Treatments (2011) - sold via Flouride's web store only

=== Singles ===
- "Shortnin Bread" (1982), Alternative Tentacles
