= The Wynona Riders =

American punk band

- Origin: East Bay
- Genres: Punk rock, pop punk
- Label: Lookout!
- Members: Ron Greer; Joe Selby; Richie Butcher; Dave Henwood
- Past members: Mike Lipari; Eric Matson; Ron Murphy; Jim Tyler; Rico Martinez; Paul Naginis

The Wynona Riders are an East Bay pop punk band formed in 1988 as Miss Conduct by Jim Tyler (drums), Eric Matson (guitar), Ron Murphy (bass) and Mike Lipari (vocals). In 1989 Ron Greer (Skip) joined the band as the lead singer, changing their name upon their first 924 Gilman Street performance. It was named after the actress Winona Ryder.

== Personnel changes ==
Jim Tyler did not get along with his bandmates very well due to his renewed Christian values, so he left the band in 1990 for college. Jim went on to play drums for Flaccid and HOSS, based in Fort Collins, Co. Ron Murphy originally took over drumming duties, but continuing creative differences led to his split from the band. Bass playing then went to Jack Cheeze (Paul Naginis), while Rico Martinez filled in on drums. In this line-up they recorded the track "Break" for a compilation album called "Can of Pork" (LKOUT 44). Subsequently, Rico was thrown in jail and replaced by Dave "E.C." Henwood of Filth and The Vagrants.

Jack Cheeze left the band over creative differences. Replaced by Richie Bucher, they recorded an EP called "Send in the clowns". In 1992, a tour across the U.S. was planned, when Erick suddenly quit the band without an explanation. Skip and Richie started the band "Here Kitty Kitty" with Joe Selby and Kreig White, and recorded some demos. As "Here Kitty Kitty" they did a tour across the U.S. in 1994.

Meanwhile, Skip asked their record company, Lookout! Records, if they would be interested to release the Wynona Riders demos on CD, as he did not want the music of that band to fade into history. When he asked Dave for his opinion on the release of these demos, he suggested that re-recording the tracks might be a better idea.

Skip, Dave and Richie got together, auditioned for a new guitar player, but eventually wound up working with Erick again. The recording sessions resulted in the album J.D. Salinger, containing a cover of Kim Wilde's Kids in America.

After the release of this album, Erick joined the band "Jack Killed Jill" and announced that he could not tour with The Wynona Riders. Upon hearing this, the other three members kicked him out of the band for good. After auditioning Patrick Hynes (one of the three owners of Lookout! Records at the time) and Joe Selby the band chose Joe to fill the guitar role for their 1995 US tour in support of the "J.D. Salinger" LP/CD.

After a successful tour that saw The Wynona Riders play over 40 shows around the country in six weeks the band decided to try to stick it out with the touring line-up and began writing new material for a follow-up record. An interim release under the name The Nation of Wenonah was released on What Else? records out of Indiana as a split EP with band Lynard's Innards. The EP was a send-up/tribute of the Washington D.C. band the Nation of Ulysses. As more new songs were written the style of the band was veering towards the agitpop styles of other D.C. bands from the early 1990s and Richie and Dave found themselves less than enthusiastic about the direction the band was headed.

Time was booked into Andy Ernst's Art of Ears studio, where "J.D. Salinger" had been recorded to record an EP, Artificial Intelligence(LKOUT 162) for Lookout!, but before the band entered the studio they broke up after performing onstage at 924 Gilman St. in Berkeley, ironically while opening for Fifteen's farewell show.

Skip and Joe formed the band "Toyboat" with former Red #9 and Hi-Fives drummer Julie Rose and bassist Adam Turk, E.C. joined the band "Three Years Down", and Richie went to work at a bakery. A year later Toyboat would disband and Joe Selby would join Three Years Down as their bass player with Skip moving to New York to pursue a career in information technology.

== Current members ==
- Ron "Skip" Greer: Vocals
- Joe Selby: Guitar
- Richie Bucher: Bass
- Dave Henwood: Drums

=== Past members ===
- Eric Matson: Guitar
- Ron Murphy: Bass, drums
- Paul Naginis: Bass
- Rico Martinez: Drums
- Jim Tyler: Drums
- Mike Lipari: Vocals

== Discography ==
=== Studio albums ===
Year	Album details
1995	J.D. Salinger: Released: 1995; Label: Lookout! (LK 104); Formats: CD, LP

=== Compilation albums ===
Year	Album details
1999	How to Make an American Quit: Released: 1999; Label: Coldfront (CF 020); Formats: CD

=== Extended plays ===
Year	EP details
1992	Some Enchanted Evening: Released: 1992; Label: Lookout! (LR 52); Format: 7-inch
1992	Send In the Clowns: Released: 1992; Label: Iteration (ITERATION 001); Format: 7-inch
1997	Artificial Intelligence: Released: 1997; Label: Lookout! (LK 162); Formats: CD, LP

=== Split EPs ===
Year	Split details	Tracks
1992	Jolt / The Wynona Riders: Released: 1992; Label: Homemade (HM 05); Format: 7-inch; Reissued: 1998 on THD Records	Side A: Jolt – "Let It Go" / "Tilt"; Side B: The Wynona Riders – "Juicyfruit" / "Squirrel Happy" / "Corrupted" / "Downtown"
1996	Lynard's Innards / The Wynona Riders (as The Nation of Wennonah): Released: 1996; Label: What Else? (WE 7.0); Format: 10-inch	Side A: Lynard's Innards – "20 GOTO 10" / "Sodapop" / "Ad Nauseum" / "Kitty Problem" / "Stand and Deliver"; Side B: The Wynona Riders – "Adolescent Disaster" / "Bang Bang, Orangutan" / "Corrupted" / "Rebel Girl"

=== Compilation appearances ===
Year	Title	Track	Label
1992	Can of Pork CD/2xLP	"Break"	Lookout! (LR 44)
1993	Misfit Heartbeat 2×7-inch	"Kids in America"	Iteration (ITERATION 2), Take a Day (TAKEADAY 2)
1996	Punk Uprisings CD	"Deep End"	Lookout! (LK 139)
1996	Heide Sez CD	"Sprang"	Lookout! (LK 169)
1996	Winter Compilation CD	"Downtown"	Lookout!, Beat Generation
1996	I Can't Believe It's Not Water CD/LP	"Future Primitive"	Just Add Water (JAW 010), Rhetoric (RH 33)
1996	Pogo Strut Slam Swivel + Mosh CD	"Crazy, Man"	Devil Doll (DDR 001)
1996	Bass Ackwards CD	"Everybody's Favorite"	Interbang (IBR 001)
1999	Music to Listen to Music By CD	"Downtown"	Coldfront (CF 024)
2001	Not So Quiet on the Coldfront CD	"Break"	Coldfront CF 051)
