= Penis Landscape =

Painting by H. R. Giger

Penis Landscape

Penis Landscape, or Work 219: Landscape XX, is a painting by H. R. Giger. Created in 1973, airbrushed acrylic on paper-covered wood, it measures 70 by 100 centimetres (28 by 39 in). It depicts a number of penises entering vaginas, arranged in an alternating pattern; one of them wearing a condom.

It came to a greater level of attention during the trial of vocalist Jello Biafra after his band the Dead Kennedys featured it as a poster included with their 1985 album Frankenchrist. The poster was printed and inserted in the Frankenchrist album with an additional sticker on the outside shrinkwrap, warning buyers of the contents. The resulting trial for obscenity nearly drove the band's label, Alternative Tentacles, into bankruptcy, though the case did not result in a conviction. It was only through the support of fans that the label was able to stay alive. Biafra gained attention as a champion of free speech, and was subsequently one of the most active opponents of the Parents Music Resource Center.
