= D. H. Peligro =

American punk rock musician (1959–2022)

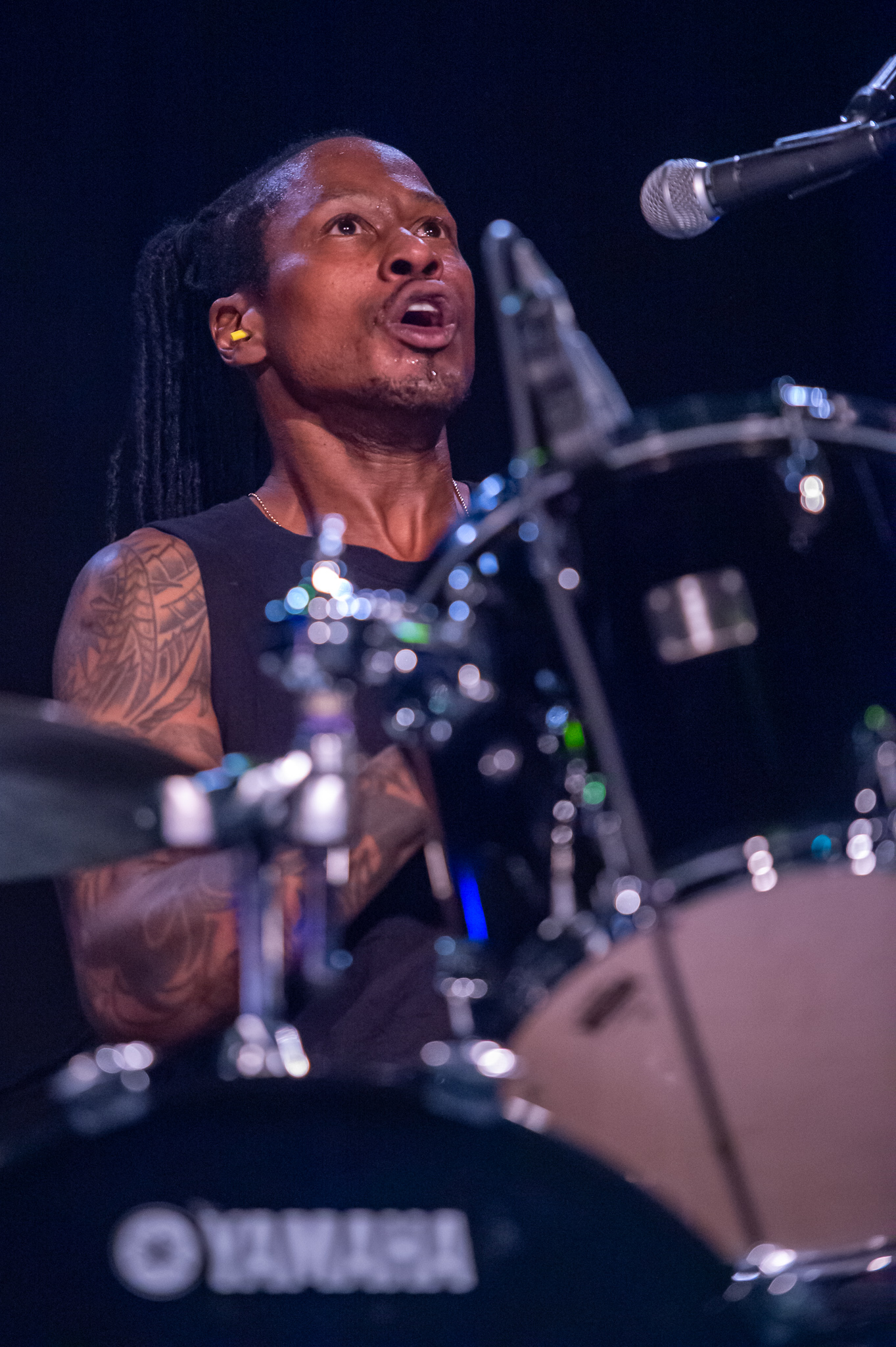
- Peligro in 2019

Background information
- Born: Darren Eric Henley; July 9, 1959; St. Louis, Missouri, U.S.
- Died: October 28, 2022 (aged 63) Los Angeles, California, U.S.
- Genres: Hardcore punk, funk rock, punk rock, thrash metal
- Occupation: Musician
- Instruments: Drums, vocals, guitar
- Years active: 1981–2022
- Formerly of: Dead Kennedys, Red Hot Chili Peppers, The Feederz, Lock Up, Peligro

Darren Eric Henley (July 9, 1959 – October 28, 2022), better known by his stage name D. H. Peligro, was an American punk rock musician, most commonly known as the drummer for Dead Kennedys along with a brief stint as the drummer for Red Hot Chili Peppers.

== Career ==
=== Dead Kennedys (1981–1986, 2001–2008, 2009–2022) ===
Peligro joined Dead Kennedys in February 1981, replacing original drummer, Ted, and made his recorded debut with the group on the EP In God We Trust, Inc. which was released in December of that year. He would go on to record the studio albums Plastic Surgery Disasters, Frankenchrist, and Bedtime for Democracy, as well as singles and other tracks that appeared on the collection, Give Me Convenience or Give Me Death. Dead Kennedys broke up in December 1986.

In 2001, Dead Kennedys along with Peligro reunited without former frontman and primary songwriter Jello Biafra following a civil fraud complaint against Biafra, accusing him of withholding royalties. Biafra was found liable for fraud, malice, and breach of contract, a verdict upheld on appeal before the California Supreme Court, and was ordered to pay $220,000 in actual and punitive damages.

In early 2008, Peligro took a hiatus from Dead Kennedys, citing the need for time off from touring. The brief hiatus lasted until June 2009 when Peligro rejoined the band.

=== Red Hot Chili Peppers (1988) ===
In August 1988, Peligro joined the Red Hot Chili Peppers replacing drummer Jack Irons. Peligro helped to write some songs on the band's fourth album, Mother's Milk, although he did not perform on the album. Due to his ongoing drug and alcohol issues, the band decided to fire Peligro in November 1988.

=== Other bands ===
Peligro also played briefly with The Hellations, Jungle Studs, Nailbomb, The Feederz, Lock-Up, The Too Free Stooges, Off! and SSI. Peligro was the frontman for his band called Peligro which released three albums: Peligro (released in 1995 on Biafra's Alternative Tentacles record label, but deleted from the catalog in 2001), Welcome to America and Sum of Our Surroundings, which won Rock Album of the Year from the American Independent Music Awards. Peligro's sound is known to be an eclectic combination of punk, reggae, funk and heavy metal. D. H. Peligro has also fronted the bands Reverend Jones and the Cool Aid Choir and Al Sharpton's Hair and the Hellions. He appears as an interview subject in the 2003 documentary Afro-Punk. In 2020, Peligro recorded the song "Power is Taken" with Moby, which was also included on Moby's album All Visible Objects.

== Death ==
On October 28, 2022, Peligro died in his Los Angeles home. Police reported that he died from trauma to the head, caused by an accidental fall. On May 2, 2023, Peligro's official cause of death was released, revealing that his death was due to an overdose from a mixture of heroin and fentanyl. Peligro also had non-small-cell lung cancer at the time of his death.

== Discography ==
=== Dead Kennedys ===
- In God We Trust, Inc. (1981)
- Plastic Surgery Disasters (1982)
- Frankenchrist (1985)
- Bedtime for Democracy (1986)
- Give Me Convenience or Give Me Death (1987)
- DMPO's on Broadway (2000)
- Mutiny on the Bay (2001)
- The Early Years Live (2001)
- In God We Trust, Inc.: The Lost Tapes (2003)
- Live at the Deaf Club (2004)
- Milking the Sacred Cow (2007)
- Original Singles Collection (2014)

=== Jungle Studs ===
- Jungle Studs (1986)

=== Peligro ===
- Peligro (1995)
- Welcome To America (2000)
- Sum Of Our Surroundings (2004)

=== Red Hot Chili Peppers ===
- Mother's Milk (1989) (co-wrote "Sexy Mexican Maid", "Stone Cold Bush" and "Taste the Pain")

=== Nailbomb ===
- Proud to Commit Commercial Suicide (1995) (drums on "Police Truck (Dead Kennedys Cover)", "Exploitation (Doom Cover)" and "World of Shit")
