= Thunder Up =

Studio album by the Sound
- Released: December 1987
- Recorded: 1987
- Studios: Elephant, Wapping, London
- Genre: Post-punk
- Length: 40:14
- Label: Play It Again Sam
- Producers: The Sound; Nick Robbins

The Sound chronology
Heads and Hearts (1985)	Thunder Up (1987)	Propaganda (1999)

Singles from Thunder Up
- 1. "Hand of Love" Released: 1987; 2. "Iron Years" Released: 1987

Thunder Up is the fifth and final studio album by English post-punk band the Sound, released in 1987 on Belgian record label Play It Again Sam.

Two singles were released from the album: "Hand of Love" and "Iron Years". The album and its subsequent tour precipitated the band's breakup in early 1988. Like the Sound's previous records, the album was not commercially successful, but the band largely considered it to be their best work.

== History ==
By 1987, the Sound were solid veterans in the music industry; they had, for instance, already passed through two record labels (Korova and Statik), released four studio albums (1980's Jeopardy, 1981's From the Lions Mouth [sic], 1982's All Fall Down and 1985's Heads and Hearts), one EP (1984's Shock of Daylight) and one live album (1985's In the Hothouse).

== Background ==
Thunder Up was recorded at Elephant Studio in London.

Adam Brent Houghtaling, author of This Will End in Tears, wrote that with Thunder Up, "the aggression evident on [the Sound's] earlier releases had largely calmed into a more polished guitar pop".

== Release ==
Thunder Up was released in 1987 by Play It Again Sam. The album and its subsequent tour precipitated the band's breakup in early 1988.

== Reception ==
Professional ratings
Review scores
Source	Rating
AllMusic	3/5 stars
The Big Takeover	favourable
Trouser Press	favourable

The album was well received immediately on release by The Big Takeover, who acknowledged it as a "stunning, moving juggernaut". Critical appraisal from the mainstream press the work has largely been absent, although it was championed by Melody Maker upon release: "The Sound, by refining their despair, simply amplify their magnificence and magnify the intensity of expression".

Thunder Up was a favourite among Sound members. Drummer Michael Dudley named it as one of his favourite Sound albums (along with Propaganda), while Graham Bailey called it the band's "crowning glory". In a 1988 interview, frontman Adrian Borland said, "Ultimately I find Thunder Up the very best album, because it sounds like the band 'live' in the studio and, in a way, it actually was".

== Track listing ==
All tracks are written by Adrian Borland, except as noted.

No.	Title	Writer(s)	Length
1.	"Acceleration Group"		3:32
2.	"Hand of Love"		3:18
3.	"Barria Alta"	Borland, Colvin "Max" Mayers, Graham Bailey, Michael Dudley	4:47
4.	"Kinetic"		5:15
5.	"Iron Years"	Borland, Bailey	4:11
6.	"Prove Me Wrong"		2:28
7.	"Shot Up and Shut Down"		4:19
8.	"Web of Wicked Ways"		2:56
9.	"I Give You Pain"		5:05
10.	"You've Got a Way"		5:29

Note: In some editions, "You've Got a Way" is separated into two tracks, parts "I" and "II", to distinguish the initial piano piece reprise of “Hand of Love”. This brings the total number of tracks on some editions to 11.
