= Propaganda (The Sound album) =

Studio album by The Sound
- Released: 26 April 1999
- Recorded: May–June 1979
- Genre: Post-punk
- Length: 43:57
- Label: Renascent
- Producer: Bob Borland

The Sound chronology
Thunder Up (1987)	Propaganda (1999)	The BBC Recordings (2004)

Propaganda is an album by English post-punk band the Sound. It was recorded in 1979, before they recorded their debut album Jeopardy, and comprises the earliest material that they recorded. It was not released until April 1999 by record label Renascent, more than 10 years after the band broke up. It was viewed by the band as their true first album.

Re-recorded versions of three of the tracks appeared on Jeopardy: "Missiles", "Night Versus Day" and "Words Fail Me".

In 2015 the album was reissued as part of a five-disc box set that also included the albums Shock of Daylight, Heads and Hearts, In The Hothouse (Live) and Thunder Up.

== Critical reception ==
Professional ratings
Review scores
Source	Rating
AllMusic	3/5 stars
Prefix	7/10 stars

AllMusic critic Andy Kellman, while noting the apparent influence of the Stooges, MC5 and Roxy Music, said, "Despite the fact that these people were just getting used to playing with each other, most everything sounds assured, tight, and nearly professional. What these songs suffer from in derivation is equaled in skill, quality, and enthusiasm".

Dan Nishimoto, writing for Prefix, stated, "There are the timely circumstances. There are the comparisons to peers such as Joy Division and Echo & the Bunnymen. There are the albums of unquestioned quality, depth and longevity. There are the tragic misfortunes and unrealized dreams. And, now, they are mostly memories".

== Track listing ==
1. "No Salvation"
2. "Deep Breath"
3. "Cost of Living"
4. "Quarter Past Two"
5. "Night Versus Day"
6. "Physical World"
7. "Statik"
8. "Music Business"
9. "Propaganda"
10. "Words Fail Me"
11. "One More Escape"
12. "Missiles"

== Personnel ==
- Adrian Borland – vocals, guitar, production
- Michael Dudley – drums, production
- Green (Graham Bailey) – bass guitar, production
- Belinda "Bi" Marshall – keyboard, production
- Recorded by Bob Borland
- Remixed by Wally Brill in 1999
