= Close Up (The Outsiders album) =

Studio album by The Outsiders
- Released: 1978
- Recorded: 1978 at Spaceward, Cambridge, England
- Genre: Punk rock
- Label: Raw Edge

The Outsiders chronology
One to Infinity (1977)	Close Up (1978)

Close Up is the second and final studio album by English punk band the Outsiders, which would later evolve into the Sound. It was released in 1978 by record label Raw Edge.

== Background ==
In the liner notes of the 2012 reissue of the album, the musical style of Close Up was described: "Gone were the acoustic guitars and lengthy solos, replaced by urgency, stabbing riffs and a full-on, hard-edged punk/new wave sound".

== Track listing ==
Side A

1. "Vital Hours"
2. "Observations"
3. "Fixed Up"
4. "Touch and Go"
5. "White Debt"
6. "Count for Something"

Side B

1. "Out of Place"
2. "Keep the Pain Inside"
3. "Face to Face"
4. "Semi-Detached Life"
5. "Conspiracy of War"

== Critical reception ==
Professional ratings
Review scores
Source	Rating
AllMusic	4/5 stars
NME	generally favourable
Record Mirror	unfavourable

Close Up received a lukewarm response from critics, who were more enthusiastic about it than the band's previous album, Calling on Youth. NME reviewer John Hamblett assessed the album as "patchy, but promising", calling the Outsiders "a band with a future".

== Personnel ==
- Adrian Borland – vocals, guitar
- Jan (Adrian Janes) – drums, vocals
- Bob Lawrence – bass guitar
- Graham Green – bass guitar

Technical

- Gary Lucas – engineering
- June Oliver – sleeve photography
