= Kevin Hewick =

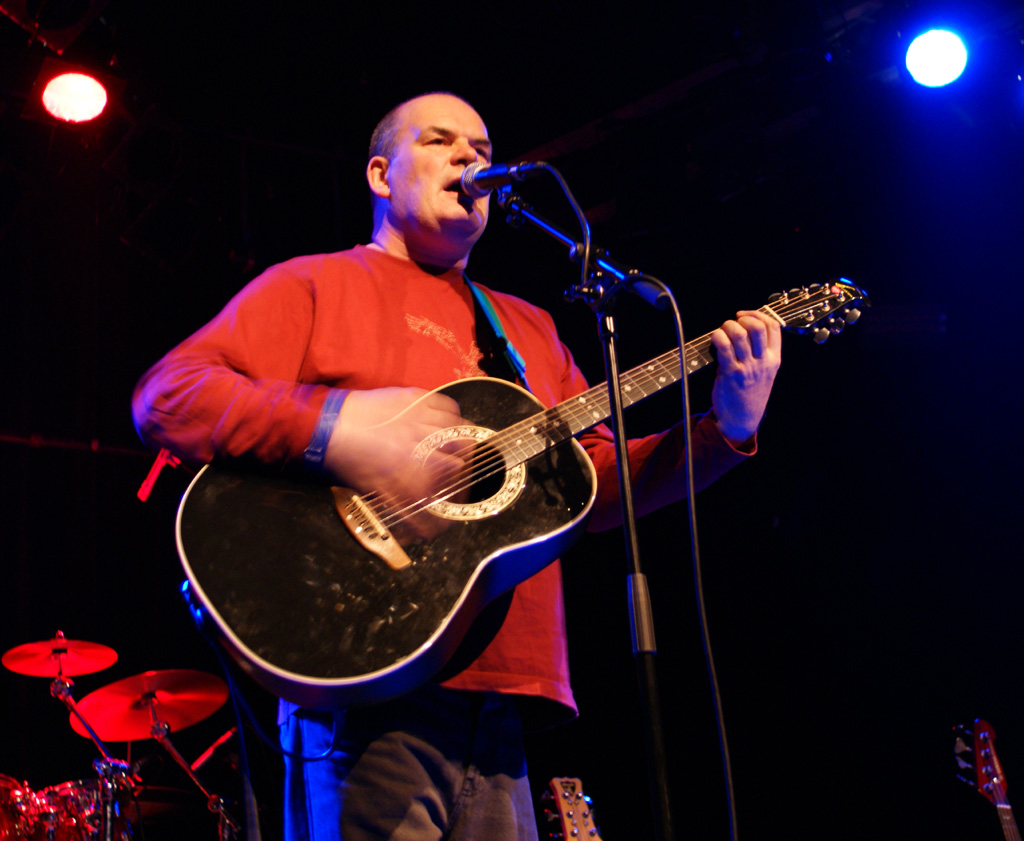
- Kevin Hewick in 2008.

Background information
- Born: 4 February 1957 (age 68); Leicester, England
- Occupation: Singer-songwriter
- Instruments: Acoustic guitar; electric guitar; bass guitar; microKorg; vocals
- Years active: 1979–present
- Labels: Factory; Cherry Red; Sorted; Burning Shed; Pink Box; Botheration
- Website: kevinhewick.co.uk

Kevin Hewick (born 4 February 1957) is an English singer-songwriter who was an early member of the Factory Records roster. Today he is known for his recordings on Sorted, Pink Box and his own Botheration label, and his work with Venetian collective Unfolk.

== Career ==
=== The Factory years ===
Born in Leicester, Hewick received his first guitar at the age of 6, but only learned to play in his teens while studying at Countesthorpe College. He played in a band called Life before going solo, while working in a social security office following graduation from university. In 1979, a demo tape sent to Factory Records impressed Tony Wilson sufficiently to offer Hewick the chance to record for the label. Newly added to the Factory roster, Hewick had a recording session in June 1980 with producer Martin Hannett in Graveyard Studios, where he recorded two tracks ("Haystack", released on From Brussels with Love compilation in 1981, and "A Piece of Fate") with the three surviving members of Joy Division, a month after the death of Ian Curtis and just prior to their adopting the name New Order.

Other Factory releases included the controversial live side of the A Factory Quartet double album (FACT 24) in 1981—live tracks chosen against Hewick's wishes by Wilson, that featured a confrontation between Hewick and a very aggressive audience—and the single "Ophelia's Drinking Song" (FAC 48), which featured producer Donald Johnson of A Certain Ratio on percussion and was mixed by Peter Hook of New Order.

=== Cherry Red ===
Hewick signed to Cherry Red Records in 1983, and released the album Such Hunger for Love, the single "Feathering the Nest", and This Cover Keeps Reality Unreal, a four-track 12-inch EP recorded in collaboration with The Sound. These and various items from Hewick's time on Factory were later reissued by Cherry Red in 2003 as the Tender Bruises and Scars compilation CD. Hewick wrote the liner notes for this album, detailing his long fight with depression in the years after Cherry Red dropped him from their roster in 1984. During the latter half of the 1980s Hewick lived at his parents' house in Leicester and worked as a teacher for adults with learning disabilities.

=== Later career ===
Hewick returned to the Leicester music scene in 1989, and released two cassette albums in the early 1990s. Leicester label Sorted Records released the Helpline album in 1999. He continues to perform frequent gigs within the city, both as a performer and/or event organiser. He booked acts and hosted the monthly Firebug Comfort Zone Sunday afternoon acoustic sessions between September 2005 and October 2006. Hewick also returned to the London acoustic circuit, often performing at the 12 Bar Club in Denmark Street. He sang onstage there with Subterraneans in November 2010.

Hewick developed a live show which often reached 3–4 hours in length, where he played many of his own songs and unusual cover versions such as John Lennon's "Isolation", the Doors "Wishful Sinful", Led Zeppelin's "Tangerine" and various Jimi Hendrix numbers.

Hewick's support slots over the years have included Roy Harper, the Fall, Joy Division, Showaddywaddy, Durutti Column, New Order, Section 25, PJ Harvey, Martin Carthy, Kevin Coyne, Fairport Convention, Dr. Robert, BJ Cole and Bobby Valentino, Eyeless in Gaza, Sonja Kristina, Clive Gregson, Ben Watt, Tim Rose, Sophie Barker, Tina Dico, Dan Reed, Lene Lovich and Jackie Leven.

He twice paid tribute to his old friend, the late Adrian Borland of the Sound, at concerts held in Borland's memory in the Netherlands, at the Patronaat Haarlem (2001) and Amsterdam Paradiso (2006). He also toured Germany with the Convent in 2001.

In 2007, LTM Records reissued the 1980 Les Disques du Crépuscule compilation From Brussels With Love (which features "Haystack" from the 1980 session with New Order), and Whispers in the Offing, a tribute album to Kevin Coyne on which Hewick contributed a version of Coyne's song "Raindrops on the Window".

Hewick joined the roster of Pink Box Records, which released "Something to Do on the Bus", a limited-edition 7-inch single on yellow vinyl, and the four-track downloadable EP That Side of You, in July 2007.

On 15 December 2007, Hewick took part in the "A Factory Night (Once Again)" performance at Brussels Plan K with Section 25, Crispy Ambulance, the Names and DJs Peter Hook and Martin Moscrop. This event was filmed and released as a DVD by LTM Records in May 2008, featuring five of the songs Hewick performed.

Further European dates with Section 25 and Peter Hook took place in Paris, Brussels, Oss in the southern Netherlands and Krefeld in North Rhine-Westphalia, Germany in November 2008. Hewick opened on all these dates and played guitar with Hook and Section 25 on New Order's "Doubts Even Here" at Krefeld. Hewick also took part in the 24-hour "Tony Wilson Experience" in Manchester on 21–22 June 2008 including playing with Hook in an improvisational accompaniment to an action painting by artist Phil Diggle in the foyer of Urbis.

On 14 February 2009, Hewick released a free downloadable album, Doomcloud, on his website, featuring 12 songs recorded in 2000, 2001 and 2003.

Hewick recorded "Personal Loss" for Patrik Fitzgerald tribute album All Sewn Up, which was nominated for an Independent Music Award for best tribute album. He also took part in the release concert celebrating Fitzgerald's 50th birthday at Verkstedhallen, Trondheim, Norway, on 6 March 2009.

He opened for Hook and the Light at Manchester's FAC 251 club on 18 May 2010, when Hook performed Joy Division's Unknown Pleasures in full. He was invited back by Hook to fill the support slots for the 18 and 19 May 2011 FAC 251 performances of Closer and the 18 and 19 May shows in 2012.

Hewick appeared at and promoted shows at Leicester Musician for Section 25 in September 2010, for an event with Viv Albertine of The Slits and Jude Rawlins of Subterraneans on 3 April 2011, and for a performance on 18 September 2011 where Hewick performed with former Cherry Red labelmates Eyeless in Gaza.

A further Factory-connected event was Hewick's appearance at Paul Morley's "Tribute to Tony Wilson" at the Purcell Room at London's South Bank on 16 June 2011 as part of Ray Davies's Meltdown Festival. Hewick performed three songs specially written for this event, which also included an appearance by Orchestral Manoeuvres in the Dark. These songs were later included on Hewick's 2012 All Was Numbered album.

During December 2011 and January 2012, Hewick recorded the album All Was Numbered, featuring guests such as Sally Barker and John Butler of Diesel Park West. It was released on Peter Hook's Hacienda download label in April 2012.

Hewick's next album, The Heat of Molten Diamonds, was released on Pink Box Records in December 2013.

On 7 December 2014, Hewick debuted a new trio lineup with Mark "Flash" Haynes on drums and percussion and David Conrad Dhonau on bass and cello.

In 2016, Hewick issued his album Touching Stones, Tasting Rain on his own Botheration label.

=== Collaborations and groups ===
Hewick has guested on guitar and/or vocals on albums by the Freed Unit, Steve Cartwright, Meta-Tekki and on ist's King Martha (2005) He co-wrote the song "A Scotsman in a Church", which appeared on the ist album Toothpick Bridge (2009) and has contributed both lyrics and vocals to music written by Alessandro Monti for Italian act Unfolk's album The Venetian Book of the Dead, released in February 2010 (a live performance of that album was played in Italy at Musica Continua in Mestre on 19 March 2011). He performed with Leven in the Stornoway Girls, and appeared on Leven's live albums Greetings from Milford (2001) and Only the Ocean Can Forgive (2003).

Hewick also returned to the London acoustic circuit, often performing at 12 Bar Club in Denmark Street. He sang onstage there with Subterraneans in November 2010.

The Soar Valley Wayfarers debuted at the Attik Club in Leicester on 21 June 2006. SVW are an ongoing folk/avant-garde skiffle group comprising Hewick, Mr Plow on guitar and vocals, and Flash of ist on percussion.

On 23 August 2008, Hewick debuted No Junk Promise at Leicester Firebug. This band featured Hewick on guitar and vocals, Gemma Warne on drums, Simon Ball on bass and Neil Johnston on guitar. Warne and Ball had previously performed a one-off show with Hewick as the Kevin Hewick Sexperience in May 2008.

Another band lineup, Hewick Haynes & James, debuted at Leicester Victoria Park Pavilion on 31 January 2009, including drummer Haynes and bassist Pete James. HH&J performed at the Leicester Summer Sundae festival on the De Montfort Hall indoor stage in August 2009 and at Alan McGee's (Creation Records) Death Disco night in London at Notting Hill Arts Club in October 2009. In 2011, they appeared with Welsh alternative rockers the Holy Coves and American soul-rock outfit Vintage Trouble.

Following two appearances together at The Donkey in Leicester, Hewick and Sally Barker debuted a new band called Liberation Doll in October 2011, with Lee Allatson and Ian Crabtree.

== Discography ==
=== Studio albums ===
- Such Hunger for Love (1983, Cherry Red)
- In an Open-Air Surgery (1993, self-released)
- Helpline (1999, Sorted)
- Keep Your Flipped Wigs On (2008, Pink Box)
- Doomcloud (2009, self-released)
- All Was Numbered (2012, Haçienda)
- The Heat of Molten Diamonds (2013, Pink Box)
- Touching Stones, Tasting Rain (2016, Botheration)
- ‘'Driven By Love, Driven By Hate'’ (2017, Botheration)
- ’'Never Give Up on a Song'’ (2021, Botheration)

=== Live albums ===
- Live at the Loaded Dog November 17th 1998 (2016, Botheration)

=== Compilation albums ===
- Tender Bruises and Scars – The Factory and Cherry Red Years 1980–1983 (2002, Cherry Red)

=== Singles and EPs ===
- "Ophelia's Drinking Song" (1982, Factory)
- "Feathering the Nest" (1983, Cherry Red)
- "Something to Do on the Bus" (2007, Pink Box)
- "Answers on a Postcard" split 7-inch with Mr Plow (2009, Pink Box)

=== Collaborations ===
With The Sound

- This Cover Keeps Reality Unreal EP (1984, Cherry Red)

With Unfolk

- The Venetian Book of the Dead (2010, Diplodisc)
- Live Book bonus disc with first Unfolk album (2012, Diplodisc)
- Intuitive Maps (2017, MP)

=== Compilation appearances (selected) ===
- "Haystack" on From Brussels with Love (1980, Les Disques Du Crépuscule)
- "Mothers Day" on Northern Lights (1981, Northern Lights)
- Seven tracks on A Factory Quartet (1981, Factory)
- "Drowned Dream Wreckage" on Tous-Ar-Fit: The Third Sorted E.P. (1996, Sorted)
- "Personal Loss" on All Sewn Up – A Tribute to Patrik Fitzgerald (2009, Crispin Glover Records)

=== DVD ===
- A Factory Night (Once Again) (2008, LTM) – with Crispy Ambulance, The Names, and Section 25
