= Adrian Borland =

English musician (1957–1999)

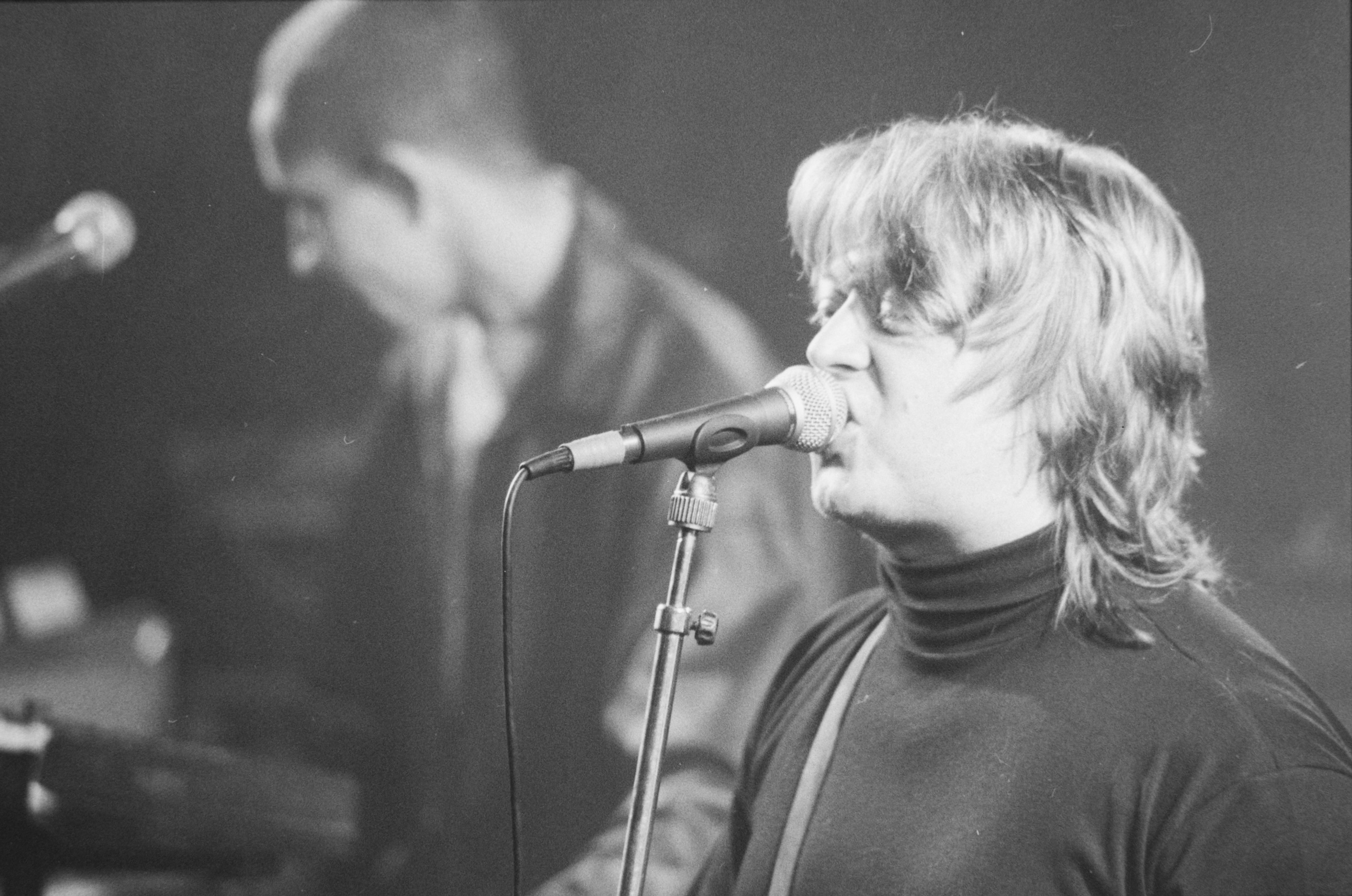
- Borland performing with the Sound (Patronaat, 1987)

Background information
- Also known as: Joachim Pimento
- Born: Adrian Kelvin Borland; 6 December 1957; Hampstead, London, England
- Died: 26 April 1999 (aged 41) Wimbledon, London, England
- Genres: Punk rock; post-punk; alternative rock; new wave
- Occupation: Musician
- Instruments: Vocals; guitar; bass; keyboards
- Years active: 1975–1999
- Labels: Play It Again Sam; Resolve; Earth; Red Sun
- Formerly of: The Outsiders; Gazunder; The Sound; Second Layer; The Witch Trials; Adrian Borland & the Citizens; Honolulu Mountain Daffodils; White Rose Transmission
- Website: brittleheaven.com

Adrian Kelvin Borland (6 December 1957 – 26 April 1999) was an English singer, songwriter, guitarist and record producer, best known as the frontman of post-punk band the Sound.

Following a substantial musical career spanning numerous groups, as well as a solo career, he died by suicide after jumping in front of a train on 26 April 1999. Some have speculated that his death was caused by his symptoms of schizoaffective disorder.

== Early career ==
Adrian Kelvin Borland was born in the Hampstead area of London, the son of Bob Borland, a physicist at the National Physical Laboratory, and Win, an English teacher.

At primary school the young Borland was already friends with future Sound bassist (and Second Layer collaborator) Graham "Green" Bailey, and would meet Stephen Budd, closely involved with his band the Sound in their early years, in his early teens. Budd would later recall, "We met when we were both 14. He was the only other kid I knew with an electric guitar. Even at 14 you could see he was a genius". Borland played guitar left-handed.

Borland's first band, the Wimbledon-based punk rock trio the Outsiders, was formed with Borland as its nucleus, on vocals and guitar. Bob Lawrence was on bass, and Adrian 'Jan' Janes on drums. Their debut LP, Calling on Youth, was self-released on their Raw Edge label and became the first UK self-released punk album. It won them their first unfavourable reviews: "apple-cheeked Ade has a complexion that would turn a Devon milkmaid green with envy", reported the NME.

A single released that November, One to Infinity, was labelled as "tuneless, gormless, gutless" (again by the NME), but was praised elsewhere. It was followed by a second album, Close Up, in 1978. This received better reviews from the press. During his time with the Outsiders he played on stage with Iggy Pop. Tim Smith of Cardiacs played his first gig at the age of 16 as Gazunder alongside Borland and rock drummer Bruce Bizland at Surbiton Assembly Rooms, which reportedly sounded like the rock instrumentals on David Bowie's The Man Who Sold the World (1970). Through Tim's membership of the early Borland group, his band Cardiacs would be connected to Borland and his later band the Sound.

It was after this album that important changes took place that would decide the band's future: Lawrence left to be replaced by Borland's friend Graham 'Green' Bailey, and Adrian Janes' departure to go to college allowed Geoffrey Cummant-Wood (the band's manager) to suggest 28-year-old Mike Dudley in his stead. The Outsiders trio then became the Sound, a quartet, with the arrival of Bi Marshall (real name Benita Biltoo), an acquaintance of Bailey's and the band from around 1977. The new sound was augmented by her use of the clarinet (later saxophone) and synthesizer.

== The Sound: 1979–1988 ==
Borland became the kernel of the Sound, being the songwriter, main vocalist and guitarist, penning tracks for the early Propaganda sessions and the Jeopardy recordings (their debut album release, originally recorded by Budd for his Tortch label which had put out the band's first release, the Physical World EP. The album was subsequently released on Warner's Korova label and Budd became the Sound's early manager). From this point on Borland became critically acclaimed, if never a household name.

The Sound's second album, From the Lions Mouth, was even more enthusiastically received, selling over 100,000 units worldwide. Borland's personal productivity was enhanced even more with two collaborations that year, one with Jello Biafra in the Witch Trials, and another with Sound bassist Graham Bailey in Second Layer, which spawned the electronic album World of Rubber. The Sound were caught on a downcurve, however, the following year with the release of All Fall Down (1982), an experimental and bitter album that represented the band's refusal to make more commercial music to satisfy their label (Korova, a Warner Bros. subsidiary). Korova responded by dropping them, while the music press rapidly disowned them; a Sounds review called the album "virtually worthless".

The Sound never recovered from this setback, although they did release a mini album, Shock of Daylight, a live album In the Hothouse and two further albums Heads and Hearts and Thunder Up over the next five years. These were all released on small independent labels, and never reversed the band's diminishing profile.

Although it is unclear as to when Borland was diagnosed with his condition, from 1985 onward the symptoms of his depression became more and more apparent. His problems would manifest themselves in many of the songs on the Sound's final album, Thunder Up, as well as in the schizophrenic layout of the piece; while the initial tracks deal with confronting issues (for example "Acceleration Group", "Barria Alta"), the second half proceeds at an entirely different tangent, becoming either tortuous ("Shot Up And Shut Down"), frenetic ("I Give You Pain") or mournful ("You've Got A Way"). The touring for Thunder Up culminated in disaster for the band when Borland left halfway through a set at Zoetermeer, Netherlands. It would be the last Sound gig. Dudley described the break-up in 2004:

We had decided the three of us, Colvin, Graham and myself, to tell Adrian that the Sound needed a break and that he should get some rest and some help, and that in the meantime we would go off and look at other things...but when it came down to it I sat there and listened to the others say "Yes, Adrian. No, Adrian" to Adrian, who wanted despite everything to go on, and I just said at that point "I'm leaving the band", my intention being that the band would come to an end there and then, forcing Adrian into the position where he would get some rest, for his sake.

The band continued without Dudley into 1988, but soon collapsed. The Big Takeover lamented that it was "Like an old friend losing a long fight with a disease". Borland would later blame himself for the break-up of the Sound.

== After the Sound: 1988–1999 ==
=== Early solo career ===
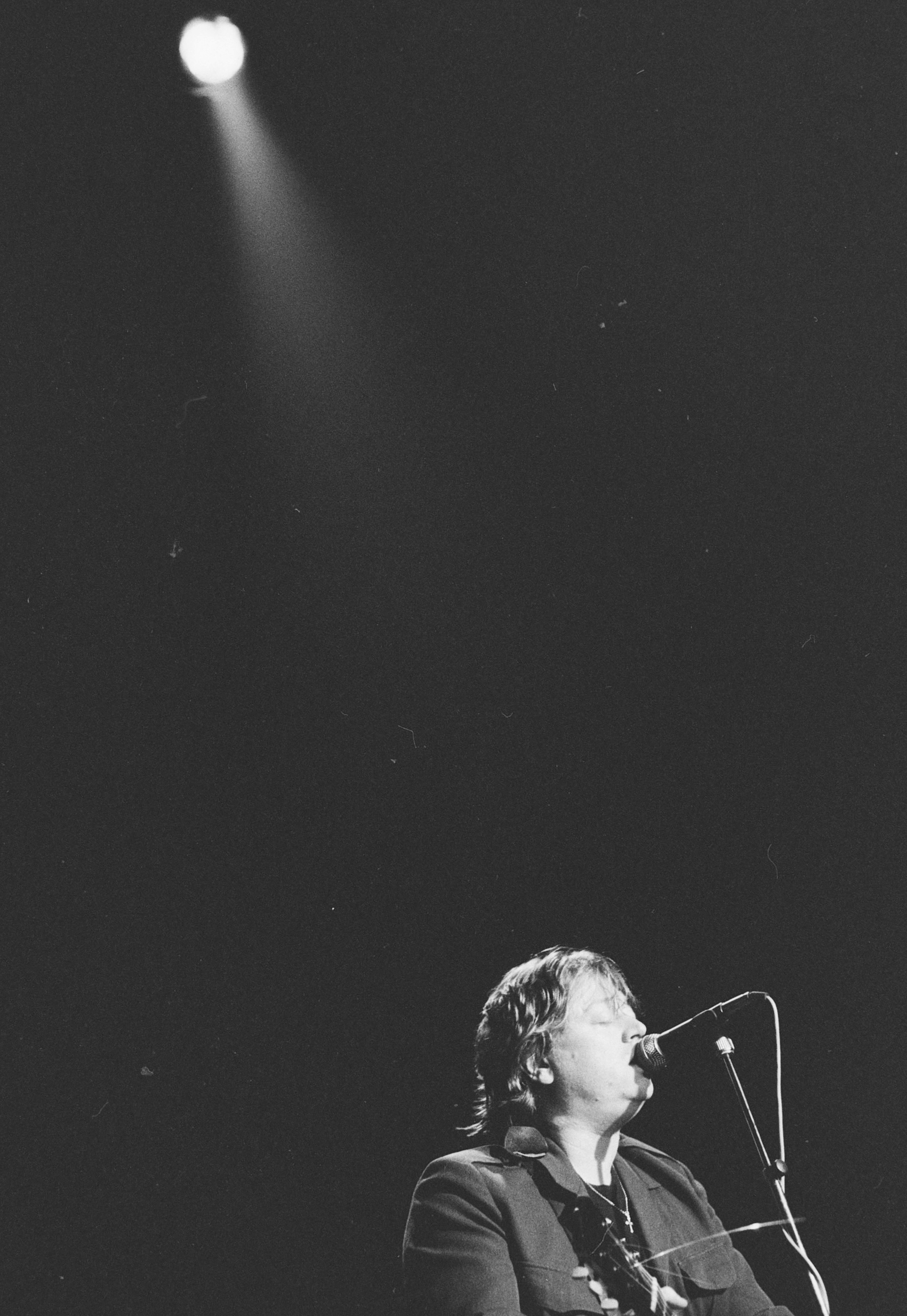
Borland (1997)

While his former bandmates discontinued their musical careers, Borland moved to the Netherlands in 1988 to found yet another band, after initially going there on holiday and to meet his manager (Rob Acda). Adrian Borland and the Citizens was formed there, taking advantage of the popularity of the Sound on the continent, and the relative inexpense of venues in the Low Countries. Musically, this was a period of unprecedented collaboration for Borland; for instance, he worked (albeit under the pseudonym "Joachim Pimento") with the Honolulu Mountain Daffodils right up until their final release Psychic Hit List Victim in 1991.

In 1989, Adrian Borland and the Citizens released Alexandria, a huge departure musically from Thunder Up and featuring four backing vocalists, bass, cello, clarinet, drums and kettle drums, piano, saxophone, harmonica, tambourine, viola, violin and guitar. Some continuity was provided by former Sound bandmate Colvin 'Max' Mayers collaborating by reprising his role of keyboardist, while Nick Robbins again engineered and co-produced the album with Borland. The album featured much calmer, lighter tracks than those on Thunder Up, such as "Light the Sky" and "Rogue Beauty". As always, some tracks deal with Borland's own precarious emotional state, such as "No Ethereal" and "Deep Deep Blue". In an interview with Melody Maker the same year, Borland said of the title:

"I think The Sound suffered from this image of being blunt and straightforward and hitting you in the face with what we wanted to say, right from "who the hell makes those missiles?" So I wanted something more vague, something almost without reason."

The album, however, suffered from poor sales, selling an estimated 10,000 copies on the continent and a mere 1,000 in England. Borland attributed this to poor distribution. Although Borland expressed an interest in re-forming his old band, the Sound never re-formed: bassist Graham Bailey moved to the United States in the early 1990s; keyboardist Max died on Boxing Day 1993 from an AIDs-related illness; and an undisclosed antagonism had caused an irreparable rift between Borland and drummer Mike Dudley. Speaking of a possible reformation in 1992, Borland said:

"it's my fault 'cos I started this rumour at an Iggy or Kraftwerk gig earlier this year, it's definitely not happening, for a start the person who probably won't do it is the drummer. But even Graham & Max have gone off the idea now. Graham & I are going to do something in the future, but we're so busy you know? When I'm not busy he's busy, we never find the right moment."

1992 saw the release of Brittle Heaven, which would later lend its name to the Adrian Borland website. With a menagerie of 14 songs with little difference in style to those of his previous release, the real difference now lay in the composition of the Citizens, which was by now almost exclusively Dutch. Don Victor now co-produced with Borland. The album benefits from lavish investment in production, although this puts it in a similar position to the Sound's Heads and Hearts album in that it is much more polished than Borland's other solo material. Critical reception ranged from the noncommittal to welcoming; AllMusic described it as 'one hour of finely woven tapestry, of gorgeous music', albeit 'Not quite as good as 1989's Alexandria', handing it three stars out of five, while David Cavanagh gave it four, praising the atmosphere of 'a strange, dizzy optimism' pervading the album. As one critic argued: '[Borland's] reflective writing remains as good as ever', and the Big Takeover went further, proclaiming it 'inspired'.

With some critical endorsement Borland continued to work on new material throughout the year. At some point in 1992 he travelled to Amsterdam to record a session with Victor Heeremans, re-recorded and released many years later as the posthumous The Amsterdam Tapes album. Recorded in a crossover point in his career, it represents a shift in both musical and mental directions: while tracks like "Ordinary Angel" show some continuity with the tone of Brittle Heaven, the forcefulness of tracks such as "Fast Blue World", "Darkest Heart" and "Via Satellite" preclude Borland's later, harder style as seen on 5:00AM and Harmony and Destruction. Conversely, the acoustic-based fragility of tracks such as "Happen" and "White Room" represents a more immediate turn to lighter, less ambitious music – the latter would be re-recorded to feature on the 1994 album Beautiful Ammunition.

This period also saw Borland's 1993 collaboration with French-Swiss musician Mark Hunziker at the latter's home studio in London, initially on the basis that Adrian would simply help Hunziker out with some solo recordings. The project became such that the duo largely ended up working on songs and lyrics brought by Adrian. These rock-sounding sessions, which included songs such as "Love=Fire" and "Under Your Black Sun" were widely bootlegged and shared among fans until compiled from a variety of sources by Jean-Paul Van Mierlo and properly mastered (by Reinier Rietveld at 2x2 Studios in Rotterdam) for release by Sounds Haarlem Likes Vinyl's "Stichting Opposite Direction" label in 2019 under the title "Lovefield", with a second batch released under the title "Neon and Stone" in 2021. The duo also recruited Mark Wilkin (drums) and Neil Rickarby (bass) for three or four live performances in the London area and came to a sad end after a suicide attempt by Borland during one of his slumps.

Around this time, Borland had also begun working on music production; he produced albums by Felt, Into Paradise and Waiting Sound.

=== Mid-1990s ===
In 1994, Borland returned to the UK to record his third album, Beautiful Ammunition, at the Acton Survival Studios on Resolve Records. Whether because of meager investment or because of his desire to explore a more acoustic sound, the new album displayed a simpler format, largely devoid of any discernible concept: "Beautiful Ammunition" is very simply put together, only acoustic guitar, synthesiser and a few drum machines. Everything is very basic, which I like", Borland said later. One notable change from Brittle Heaven is presence of dark, introspective songs, particularly "Lonely Late Nighter" and "White Room", emphasised somewhat by the empty, lonely musical framework. This is not to say, however, that more confident tracks are banished from the album: "Reunited States of Love" and "Someone Will Love You Today" are perfect examples of this, and yet still exemplify in their tentativeness a decisive split from Brittle Heaven-era songs. Critical reception was as muted as always, and mixed where evident; Big Takeover complained that it was 'too light and airy', but vaguely appraised the work as 'finely honed and pleasant'.

The following year, 1995, was to be an important year for Borland; not only was the album Cinematic written and released, but his work with Carlo van Putten, Claudia Uman, Florian Bratmann and David Maria Gramse in The White Rose Transmission came to fruition, with the side-project's self-titled debut appearing that year. They would continue to perform intermittently throughout the 1990s, Borland being a major contributor.

Cinematic was a stablemate of Beautiful Ammunition in that it was also created in the Survival Studios and under the Resolve label, yet demonstrated a further evolution in Borland's musical career. Despite being in a similar situation as regards funding, Cinematic benefited from much better, integrated production as well as punchy tracks such as "Bright White Light". With the psychological opener "Dreamfuel" a dream-like atmosphere pervaded the album, establishing itself in indolent, moody tracks like "Cinematic" and "When Can I Be Me?". It was, overall, a more coherent attempt than its predecessor, but – predictably – did not win over the public. Critical reception, however, was even more welcoming. With an AllMusic.com ranking of 4 stars the album was lauded:

"Generally quieter but no less intense than much of his '80s work, Cinematic lives up to its name more than once, with mysterious atmospheres matched by often understated but still sharply realized songs and lyrics."

Simon Heavisides stated: 'Isn't it great when your old favourites don't let you down?...[it] leaves you with the feeling at the end that you want to hear the whole damn thing over again." Mitch Myers wrote in 1997: 'Everybody is a star, but Borland's cinematic life is well worth watching.' Glenn McDonald, however, offered up a less enthusiastic summation: 'The music had an impressive sweep to it, but the production seemed to me to emphasise the mechanical repetitiveness of the arrangements'. The album also lent its name to Cinematic Overview the following year, a compilation album of Borland's work stretching all the way back to the mid seventies.

Also in 1996, the newly formed Renascent Records label reissued Sound records Heads and Hearts (with Shock of Daylight) and In The Hothouse, complete with new packaging, and liner notes by Borland himself.

=== Later years ===
Borland's last release during his lifetime was the album 5:00AM. A switch to Earth Records and a slight change of crew – Tim Smith of Cardiacs now co-produced with Borland – were the only ostensible differences between the new work and Cinematic. However, the money invested in the album allowed for much better production, a direct result of which was the recording and inclusion of "Baby Moon", a song which Borland had held onto since 1993 but did not want to waste 'on a lo-fi production'.

The songs on 5:00AM are generally punchier and more radio-friendly, such as opener "Stray Bullets", "City Speed" and "Redemption's Knees", but containing powerful, dark, indolent tracks which, at this point, Borland had made his solo trademark: "Vampiric" is possibly the best example of this in all of his discography. The album is also representative of earlier work in that it does not fail to neglect his mental state, dealing with it in an optimistic, confrontational fashion in "Over The Under": 'Under this roof, under the sky/I want to live, at least I'm going to try/But I'm over the under now'. That song would prove to be Borland's last single release. The critical reception was, perhaps, the best of any in his lifetime. Glenn McDonald produced the following glowing review:

"5:00am turns out to sound exactly the way I wanted Cinematic to. Borland's voice, when he sings like he means it, is a glorious amalgam of Burgess, Ian McNabb, Ian McCulloch, Mike Peters, Jim Kerr and Then Jerico's Mark Shaw, the breathy intimacy that for me misfired on Cinematic here filling, elegantly, the roll that hoarse fervor played in his singing with the Sound."

Borland himself was excited by 5:00AM, and was keen to draw lines between it and his most successful period: '"5:00 A.M" takes up, where "Thunder Up" – which was the last Sound album – left off...It's still the same person, who writes the songs, only a little bit less in love with himself and more worldview orientated.".

Before attending to what would become his last solo recordings, Borland wrote twelve of the fourteen tracks on The White Rose Transmission's second release, 700 Miles of Desert, recording them with the band between November 1998 and January 1999 and producing the album himself. Borland was proud of the work, and said so in his last public writing, dated 18 March 1999:

"Everybody involved worked hard but enjoyed themselves immensely and the end result is better than any of us expected. It's hard to be objective but I'll just say the final mastered slice of silver has rarely left my CD player."

== Death ==
By 1999, Borland had lived with severe depression for about 14 years. He had still been denied commercial success or widespread popularity outside of continental Europe, and he had tried to kill himself at least three times, the third (according to his mother Win Borland) when he jumped in front of a car. He had also developed a drinking problem.

His plans for that year were staggering. Not content with merely anticipating the release of 700 Miles of Desert he expressed the intention to record a sixth solo album with Heads and Hearts producer Wally Brill, a tour of Europe that June to promote the WRT album, a further tour later in the year to promote the new solo release, and 'a 12-song acoustic record with Wally Brill using percussion, trumpet, violin, viola and atmospheric electric guitar' for 2000. Meanwhile, the remastering of several the Sound recordings, created at the very start of their career in 1979, was underway by Wally Brill. The finished product, Propaganda, was released by Renascent and featured linernotes by Borland, like all previous releases. It would be officially released on 26 April – the very day Borland would die by suicide.

Of the plans drawn up by Borland over the winter, only his solo album was undertaken. It was recorded at The Premises, London over a number of months, although Borland himself recorded guide vocals and guitar in the space of about a fortnight. After this point his disposition changed. In a letter he wrote to his parents shortly before his death he expressed fear at being sectioned in Springfield mental hospital. 'He was returning home distraught and anxious...he had ignored the medical advice to pace himself', his mother, Win Borland, wrote. At evidence given at Westminster Coroner's Court it was revealed that he had visited an ex-girlfriend in the days before his death and that his condition had worsened thereafter. The Wimbledon Guardian reported:

"She said: "His thoughts were coming out loud and at one point he said there's always the railway line". She called 999 but by the time police arrived he had disappeared and was reported as a high-risk missing person. That night Mr Borland turned up at Kennington Police Station claiming he was being chased. Later he rang his mother to say he was in a curry house in Kennington. She alerted police and following a series of phone calls and hold-ups he was eventually dropped off at his mother's home at around 3.15 am by officers who described his state of mind as "lucid"."

On the night of 25 April, Borland slipped away to Wimbledon station. In the early hours of the 26 April, horrified commuters watched as Borland died by throwing himself under a train. He was 41 years of age, and was interred at the Merton & Sutton Joint Cemetery, London. In an account given by drummer Mike Dudley his funeral was attended by his parents, Bob Lawrence and Adrian Janes of The Outsiders, original Sound keyboardist Bi Marshall, early Sound manager Stephen Budd and Wally Brill, co-producer of Heads and Hearts and Harmony and Destruction, among a multitude of others.

=== Legacy ===
Although 700 Miles of Desert was released to minimal critical acclaim, Borland's work has enjoyed an appreciative critical reception and a lasting fan base, with sites such as brittleheaven.com and renascent.co.uk providing an online outlet for information and sales. In 2000, a book of anecdotes and memories written by his friends, colleagues and mother was published in English and Dutch, named Book of Happy Memories (after the Brittle Heaven song "Box of Happy Memories"), compiled by Willemien Spook and Jean-Paul van Mierlo. In 2001 a tribute album, titled In Passing – A Tribute to Adrian Borland and the Sound was released, as well as Renascent reissues of Sound albums Jeopardy!, From The Lion's Mouth and All Fall Down.

2002 saw the release of Harmony & Destruction, the remnants of his sixth solo album painstakingly salvaged by Pat Rowles (No Corridor) and audio engineer Pete Barraclough (The Lucy Show, Archive) from the recordings made by Wally Brill at the Premises and four-track demos recorded by Rowels. The BBC recordings of Sound sessions from the 1980s were released with linernotes by Mike Dudley in 2004. 2006 saw The Amsterdam Tapes, a demo album from 1992 that was rejected by his label also remastered and rerecorded by his friends; a band of them grouped together later that year under the moniker 'The Sound of Adrian Borland' to promote it. That same year five live albums, collectively known as The Dutch Radio Recordings, were released by Renascent. These garnered overwhelmingly positive reviews. His collaborative project with Graham Bailey as Second Layer was also resurrected in 2009 by Cherry Red Records; who re-released a remastered version of the 1981 album World of Rubber in the same year.

Mark Burgess' song "Adrian Be" is dedicated to him.

A book of Borland's lyrics, called Adrian Borland & The Sound - Meaning of a Distant Victory, was published in 2016 by Giuseppe Basile and Marcello Nitti.

A film about Adrian Borland, Walking in the Opposite Direction, had its world premiere at the IDFA 2016. It was produced by 'fan' Jean-Paul van Mierlo and filmmaker Marc Waltman. The film was screened worldwide in film festivals and released on DVD in 2021.

A biography on Borland, Destiny Stopped Screaming: The Life and Times of Adrian Borland', written by Simon Heavisides, was released on 26 April 2024.

== Musical style ==
=== Influences ===
Borland's initial influences can be traced through his work with The Outsiders into punk bands of the 70s, such as the Sex Pistols. However, it is clear that he had a broader appreciation for other forms of rock parallel to this; his admiration for The Stooges and Iggy Pop was reaffirmed on several occasions. Other influences included The Velvet Underground, Lou Reed, Jim Morrison and Joy Division and David Bowie. In terms of admiration for contemporaries, mid-show interview in 1984, he cited New Order, Soft Cell and Eurythmics. His favourite bands from the 1980s were The Waterboys and Talk Talk. He also lauded Ride in the early 1990s.

=== Popular themes ===
Borland's earliest lyrics with the Sound showed a tendency toward introspection, even before their music was really influenced by Joy Division. The song "Words Fail Me", was the earliest clear example of this. Many songs simply portray general themes of urban squalor, and political lyrics such as "Cost of Living", "Music Business" and the track "Missiles", which would reach infamy when included on their debut release, Jeopardy!. The songs on Jeopardy! would largely reflect inward tensions rather than political ones: a curious compromise is reached on "Unwritten Law", an attack on religious dogma surrounding suicide: 'A hand is a hand/A knife is a knife/Blood is blood/And life is life'. From The Lion's Mouth would also contain another reference to religion with "Judgement".

Political songs would be largely absent from most further releases; only "Golden Soldiers" ("And I will drink to those who sacrifice and die for me/So I could be so golden") and "Shot Up And Shot Down" ("Most of England is sleeping in the sun/But not everyone") suggest political topics. In his solo work there are more stark examples, such as "Beneath The Big Wheel" and "The Other Side of The World" on Alexandria and the quasi-religious song "Station of The Cross" on Beautiful Ammunition. As Borland's condition got worse in the latter half on the 1990s, political themes were dropped as introspective ones once more took precedence.

While Borland denied that music helped him (he said it "doesn't make any difference" in an interview in 1992 ), after his death his mother wrote that they were at least a cathartic form of therapy and "helped him to come to terms with his problems". The Jeopardy! opener "I Can't Escape Myself" would project Borland's dissatisfaction with himself, and serves as an early example of his more depressive lyrics. "Fatal Flaw", from the generally more confident album From The Lion's Mouth explores mental weakness, a theme repeated more frequently on All Fall Down in the schizophrenic "Party of The Mind" and "As Feeling Dies"; on Heads and Hearts the crazed "Whirlpool" and "Burning Part of Me"; on Thunder Up the whole second half of the album. In his solo career songs such as "Deep Deep Blue", "Lonely Late Nighter" and "Stranger in the Soul" parallel Borland's suffering with his condition.

== Discography ==
=== Solo albums ===
- Alexandria (1989), PIAS
- Brittle Heaven (1992), PIAS
- Beautiful Ammunition (1994), Resolve
- Cinematic (1995), Resolve
- 5:00 AM (1997), Earth
- The Last Days of the Rain Machine (2000), Red Sun (posthumous)
- Harmony & Destruction (2002), Red Sun (posthumous)
- The Amsterdam Tapes (2006), Pop One (posthumous)
- Beautiful Ammunition (with 3 earlier unreleased songs and inclusive the song "Beautiful Ammunition") (2017), Stichting Opposite Direction/Sounds Haarlem likes Vinyl'
- Lovefield (with 10 earlier unreleased songs (2019), Stichting Opposite Direction/Sounds Haarlem likes Vinyl'
- Cinematic (with 4 earlier unreleased songs (2020), Stichting Opposite Direction/Sounds Haarlem likes Vinyl'
- Lovefield - Neon And Stone (with 4 earlier unreleased songs (2021), Stichting Opposite Direction/Sounds Haarlem likes Vinyl'
- 2 Meter sessions (2022) Stichting Opposite Direction/Sounds Haarlem likes Vinyl'
- 5:00AM (with 2 earlier unreleased songs (2022), Stichting Opposite Direction/Sounds Haarlem likes Vinyl'
- The Scales Of Love And Hate (2022), Stichting Opposite Direction/Sounds Haarlem likes Vinyl'
- The Amsterdam Tapes (with 4 unreleased demo tracks from 1992) (2023), Sounds Haarlem Likes Vinyl'
- Alexandria (2024), Stichting Opposite Direction/Sounds Haarlem likes Vinyl'
- White Rose Transmission - 700 Miles of Desert (Stichting Opposite Direction/Sounds Haarlem likes Vinyl 2024)
- Brittle Heaven - (with 4 earlier unreleased songs Stichting Opposite Direction/Sounds Haarlem likes Vinyl 2025)
- Harmony & Destruction (with 5 earlier unreleased songs Stichting Opposite Direction/Sounds Haarlem likes Vinyl 2025)

=== Compilation albums ===
- Vital Years (1993), Gift of Life
- Cinematic Overview (promotional-only) (1995), Setanta
- BBC Recordings (2004), Renascent
- The Dutch Radio Recordings, vol 1–5 (2006), Renascent

=== Singles and EPs ===
- Light the Sky (1989), PIAS
- Beneath the Big Wheel (1989), PIAS
- All the Words (1992), PIAS
- Over the Under (1997), Earth

The Outsiders

- Calling on Youth (1977), Raw Edge
- One to Infinity 7-inch EP (1977), Raw Edge
- Close Up (1978), Raw Edge

with the Sound

- Physical World E.P. 7-inch EP (1979), Tortch
- Jeopardy! (1980), Korova (reissued 2001, Renascent)
- "Heyday" Single (1980), Korova
- Live Instinct Maxi (1981), WEA Records BV
- From the Lions Mouth (1981), Korova (reissued 2001, Renascent)
- "Sense of Purpose" Single (1981), Korova
- "Hot House" Single (1982), Korova
- All Fall Down (1982), WEA Records (reissued 2001, Renascent)
- "Party of the Mind" Single (1982), WEA Records BV
- "Mining dor Heart" Flexi (1983), Vinyl Magazine
- "Counting the Days" Single (1984), Statik
- "Golden Soldiers" Single (1984), Victoria
- Shock of Daylight EP (1984), Statik
- Heads and Hearts (1985), Statik (reissued 1996 with Shock of Daylight, Renascent)
- "Temperature Drop" Single (1985), Statik
- "Under You" Single (1985), Statik
- In the Hothouse (1985), Statik (reissued 1996, Renascent)
- Counting the Days (1986), Statik
- Thunder Up (1987), PIAS
- "Hand of Love" Single (1987), PIAS
- "Iron Years" Single (1987), PIAS
- Propaganda (1999), Renascent (recorded 1979)
- The BBC Recordings (2004)
- Physical World EP reissue (2020), Reminder
- Will And Testament/Starlight (2021), Stichting Opposite Direction/Sounds Haarlem likes Vinyl'

with the Witch Trials

- The Witch Trials (1981)

with Second Layer

- Flesh as Property EP (1979), Tortch
- State of Emergency EP (1980), Tortch
- World of Rubber (1981), Cherry Red (reissued 2009, Pop One)
- Second Layer (1987), LD Records

with Honolulu Mountain Daffodils

- Guitars of the Oceanic Undergrowth (1987)
- Tequila Dementia (1988)
- Aloha Sayonara (1991)
- Psychic Hit-List Victims (1991) (EP)
- "Also sprächt Scott Thurston" (1988) (single)

with White Rose Transmission

- White Rose Transmission (1995), Strange Music
- 700 Miles of Desert (1999), Fuego
- Remastered and vinyl: 700 Miles of Desert (Stichting Opposite Direction/Sounds Haarlem likes Vinyl 2024)
