= Shock of Daylight =

EP by The Sound
- Released: April 1984
- Recorded: January 1984
- Studio: Townhouse Studios, Crow Studio and Elephant Studio, London, England
- Genre: Post-punk
- Length: 25:01
- Label: Statik/A&M
- Producer: Pat Collier

The Sound chronology
All Fall Down (1982)	Shock of Daylight (1984)	Heads and Hearts (1985)

Singles from Shock of Daylight
- 1. "Counting the Days" Released: 1984; 2. "Golden Soldiers" Released: 1984 (Spain only)

Shock of Daylight is an EP by English post-punk band the Sound, released in April 1984 on Statik Records in the UK and A&M Records in the US.

The EP was seen by critics as a comeback for the band, after the band's critically and commercially disappointing previous album, 1982's All Fall Down. Two singles were released from the EP, "Counting the Days" and "Golden Soldiers" (the latter in Spain only).

== Background and content ==
Shock of Daylight was recorded in Studio 3 of Townhouse Studios, except for "Winter", which was recorded at Elephant Studio in London and a studio only referred to as "Crow".

Sounds described the album's style as "If All Fall Down chipped away at the gothic walls of From the Lions Mouth, Shock of Daylight nails down the carpet, but nervously pulls open the curtains".

== Release ==
Shock of Daylight was released in April 1984 by record label Statik in the UK and A & M Records in the US.

"Counting the Days" was released as a single in the UK. "Golden Soldiers" was released as a single in the same year in Spain only.

== Reception ==
Professional ratings
Review scores
Source	Rating
AllMusic	4/5 stars
The Big Takeover	favourable
Head Heritage	favourable
Melody Maker	favourable
Sounds	favourable
Trouser Press	favourable

Shock of Daylight has been well received by critics. The Big Takeover described it as "a triumphant comeback for [the Sound], a nice return from the interesting but obviously non-commercial All Fall Down, an LP whose lack of salibility effectively got 'em booted from Korova/Warners, and this first release on Static [sic] is a reminder of why they're such a great band". Melody Maker described the EP as "probably the most fearlessly outgoing music the Sound have produced since Jeopardy".

== Track listing ==
All lyrics are written by Adrian Borland.

Side A
No.	Title	Music	Length
1.	"Golden Soldiers"	Borland, Colvin Mayers	3:15
2.	"Longest Days"	Borland, Mayers, Graham Bailey, Michael Dudley	5:07
3.	"Counting the Days"	Borland, Mayers, Bailey, Dudley	3:36

Side B
No.	Title	Music	Length
1.	"Winter"	Borland	4:17
2.	"A New Way of Life"	Borland, Mayers, Bailey, Dudley	4:38
3.	"Dreams Then Plans"	Borland	4:03

== Personnel ==
The Sound

- Adrian Borland – vocals, guitar, keyboards
- Colvin "Max" Mayers – keyboards, guitar
- Graham Bailey – bass guitar
- Michael Dudley – drums, percussion

Additional personnel

- Sarah Smith – brass, brass arrangement
- Tim Smith – brass, brass arrangement
- Alan Douglas – engineering
- Pat Collier – production
- Mike Bigwood – tape operator
- Nick Robbins – drums and bass guitar on "Winter"
- Graham Simmonds – guitar and vocals on "Winter"
