= The BBC Recordings (The Sound album) =

Live album by The Sound
- Released: 2004
- Recorded: 1980–1985
- Genre: Post-punk
- Label: Renascent
- Producer: Dale Griffin; Tony Wilson

The Sound chronology
Propaganda (1999)	The BBC Recordings (2004)

The BBC Recordings is a live album by English post-punk band the Sound, consisting of two sessions and two live recordings from 1980 to 1985 done for BBC radio. It was released in 2004 by Renascent.

== Background ==
The first disc of The BBC Recordings consists of two recorded sessions, the first for Mike Read, which was originally broadcast between 6 and 9 October 1980, and the second for John Peel, broadcast on 16 November 1981. The second disc consists of concert recordings, the first broadcast on 21 November 1981 and the second broadcast on 15 June 1985.

== Reception ==
Professional ratings
Review scores
Source	Rating
AllMusic	4/5 stars
Stylus	A−
Uncut	5/5 stars

The BBC Recordings received a positive response from critics. Peter Parrish of Stylus wrote: "Capable of oppressive gloom and fiery beauty in equal measure, this double-CD compilation captures the band at their intense best". AllMusic's Andy Kellman called the Mike Read session "thrilling to hear two decades after the fact, and must've been a revelation in 1980".

== Track listing ==
Disc one: Sessions
No.	Title	Length
1.	"Heartland" (session for Mike Read, originally broadcast between 6 and 9 October 1980)	3:16
2.	"Unwritten Law" (session for Mike Read, originally broadcast between 6 and 9 October 1980)	3:39
3.	"Jeopardy" (session for Mike Read, originally broadcast between 6 and 9 October 1980)	3:50
4.	"I Can't Escape Myself" (session for Mike Read, originally broadcast between 6 and 9 October 1980)	3:50
5.	"Fatal Flaw" (session for John Peel, originally broadcast on 16 November 1981)	4:29
6.	"Skeletons" (session for John Peel, originally broadcast on 16 November 1981)	3:26
7.	"Hothouse" (session for John Peel, originally broadcast on 16 November 1981)	3:55
8.	"New Dark Age" (session for John Peel, originally broadcast on 16 November 1981)	5:23
Total length:		31:53

Disc two: In Concert
No.	Title	Length
1.	"Pete Drummond Intro" (live concert recording, originally broadcast on 21 November 1981)	0:34
2.	"Unwritten Law" (live concert recording, originally broadcast on 21 November 1981)	3:36
3.	"Skeletons" (live concert recording, originally broadcast on 21 November 1981)	3:47
4.	"Fatal Flaw" (live concert recording, originally broadcast on 21 November 1981)	4:21
5.	"Winning" (live concert recording, originally broadcast on 21 November 1981)	4:10
6.	"Sense of Purpose" (live concert recording, originally broadcast on 21 November 1981)	3:30
7.	"Heartland" (live concert recording, originally broadcast on 21 November 1981)	3:24
8.	"New Dark Age" (live concert recording, originally broadcast on 21 November 1981)	5:55
9.	"Pete Drummond + Intro Music" (live concert recording, originally broadcast on 15 June 1985)	3:54
10.	"Golden Soldiers" (live concert recording, originally broadcast on 15 June 1985)	3:36
11.	"Under You" (live concert recording, originally broadcast on 15 June 1985)	4:46
12.	"Total Recall" (live concert recording, originally broadcast on 15 June 1985)	4:41
13.	"Burning Part of Me" (live concert recording, originally broadcast on 15 June 1985)	3:31
14.	"Whirlpool" (live concert recording, originally broadcast on 15 June 1985)	3:59
15.	"Missiles" (live concert recording, originally broadcast on 15 June 1985)	7:51
Total length:		61:41

== Personnel ==
The Sound

- Adrian Borland – vocals, guitar
- Graham Bailey – bass guitar
- Colvin "Max" Mayers – keyboard (tracks 1.5–2.15)
- Bi Marshall – keyboard (tracks 1.1–1.4)
- Mike Dudley – drums, sleeve notes

Additional personnel

- Ian Nelson – saxophone (tracks 2.10, 2.11 and 2.14)

Technical

- Dale Griffin – production (tracks 1.1–1.4)
- Tony Wilson – production (tracks 1.5–1.8)
- Anthony Pugh – engineering (tracks 1.1–1.8)
- Mark Farrah – engineering (tracks 1.1–1.4)
- Nick Halliwell – mastering
- Andy Chambers – sleeve design
- Nick Griffiths – sleeve photography
- Paul Connolly – liner notes
