= The Sound (band) =

English post-punk band

- From left: Graham Bailey, Colvin "Max" Mayers, Michael Dudley and Adrian Borland

Background information
- Origin: South London, London, England
- Genres: Post-punk; gothic rock
- Years active: 1979–1988
- Labels: Tortch; Korova; WEA; Statik; PIAS
- Spinoffs: Second Layer; Honolulu Mountain Daffodils; White Rose Transmission; Adrian Borland and The Citizens; The Sound Revisited
- Spinoff of: The Outsiders
- Past members: Adrian Borland; Graham Bailey; Michael Dudley; Bi Marshall; Colvin "Max" Mayers

The Sound were an English post-punk band, formed in South London in 1979 and dissolved in 1988. They were fronted by Adrian Borland, and evolved from his previous band, the Outsiders.

The band would make their debut with the EP The Physical World in 1979, before releasing their debut album, Jeopardy. They would go on to release four more albums and two more EPs before disbanding in 1988.

While never commercially successful, the Sound have long been championed by critics, with Jeopardy in particular being cited as a forgotten classic of post-punk.

== History ==
=== Beginnings ===
The Sound were formed in South London in 1979 from the remnants of the punk band the Outsiders. The original lineup of the Sound consisted of Adrian Borland (vocals, guitar) and Graham Bailey (bass guitar), both ex-Outsiders, along with Mike Dudley (drums) and woodwinds player Bi Marshall (born Benita Biltoo). While not a member, ex-Outsider Adrian Janes would contribute ideas and co-write lyrics to the Sound's music. Borland and Bailey also made up the band Second Layer, formed around the same time as the Sound.

The Sound made their debut with the EP Physical World in 1979, released on manager Stephen Budd's Tortch label. It was favourably received by NME and received airplay from DJ John Peel. More of their early recordings were later released as the album Propaganda in 1999.

=== Signing to major label ===
Following the Physical World EP, the band intended to record a full-length album. Upon hearing the rough mixes that Budd had financed, WEA sub-label Korova, then home of Echo & the Bunnymen, offered to sign the group, and the band accepted.

Jeopardy, their debut album, was recorded inexpensively and released in November 1980 to critical acclaim; it received 5-star reviews from three major music publications, NME, Sounds and Melody Maker.

Following the album, Marshall left the band and was replaced by former Cardiacs member Colvin "Max" Mayers. For their second album, the band worked with producer Hugh Jones. From the Lions Mouth was released in 1981, to further critical acclaim, though their fanbase hadn't extended beyond a cult following. Borland also released a collaborative EP that year with Jello Biafra under the name the Witch Trials.

During the early 1980s, the Sound toured throughout Europe, covering the UK and much of the continent. Like their contemporaries the Comsat Angels (whom they toured with in 1981), they enjoyed perhaps their greatest success in the Netherlands, developing a substantial following there. The Sound recorded a Peel session and performed the single "Sense of Purpose" on the TV show Old Grey Whistle Test. In the same year, The Sound released a live EP in the Netherlands, titled Live Instinct.

Korova pressured Borland and his bandmates to come up with a more commercially successful third album, in addition to shifting the Sound from Korova to WEA proper. In an act of rebellion, they responded with All Fall Down in 1982, an album that took them even further away from the mainstream.

=== Change of record labels ===
All Fall Down was panned by critics upon its release and the band and the label parted company. In 1983, The Sound released a joint EP in collaboration with singer Kevin Hewick, This Cover Keeps Reality Unreal, on Cherry Red Records.

The band were approached by several labels, ultimately signing with independent label Statik in 1984. They released an EP, Shock of Daylight, which received favourable coverage from the music press. This was followed a year later by the full-length Heads and Hearts. By 1985, Borland had begun to exhibit symptoms of mental illness, perhaps worsened by the frustrations of his career.

Not long after the 1985 release of a live album, In the Hothouse, Statik went into bankruptcy. The band produced one more album, Thunder Up, on the Belgian label Play It Again Sam. While touring Spain in 1987, they had to cancel several appearances after Borland suffered a complete breakdown. Dudley recalled bringing an incoherent Borland home on a plane. The band split up in early 1988.

=== Post-breakup activity ===
Bailey moved to New Orleans, where he lived for 16 years, returning to the UK in 2007. Mayers died on 26 December 1993 of AIDS.

Following the collapse of the Sound, Borland maintained a solo career for approximately a decade, and participated in the side projects Honolulu Mountain Daffodils (under the alias Joachim Pimento) and White Rose Transmission. Never able to conquer his depression and anguished about returning to a psychiatric hospital, Borland, who reportedly suffered from a schizoaffective disorder, committed suicide on 26 April 1999, throwing himself in the path of an express train at Wimbledon station.

Shortly before Borland's death, the Sound's back catalog was remastered and reissued by Renascent, a label which was founded to perform solely that task. (Thunder Up is the band's only studio album to not be reissued by Renascent.)

Propaganda, an album of recordings the band had made in May to July 1979 when the group were transitioning from the Outsiders, was released in 1999. A second post-breakup release, The BBC Recordings, was issued in 2004, compiling two radio sessions and two live concerts.

Edsel Records released two box sets compiling all of the band's recordings: Jeopardy / From the Lion's Mouth / All Fall Down...Plus in 2014 and Shock of Daylight / Heads and Hearts / In the Hothouse (Live) / Thunder Up / Propaganda in 2015.

On Black Friday, November 26, 2021, SoundHaarlemlikesVinyl releases a new album 'Will and Testament' with 3 sides of live performances from different gigs. And one side of the album, called 'Startime' with 4 demos, never earlier released.

In 2022, Michael Dudley, the former drummer for the Sound, formed a new band under “#IN2THESOUND”. The band performs live material from The Sound’s previous material. The group currently serves as a tribute to late former frontman Adrian Borland. As of 2023, Michael Dudley is the only former member of The Sound who has actively returned to music.

== Musical Style ==
A post-punk band, the Sound have been cited as being influenced by proto-punk bands such as the Velvet Underground and the Stooges, as well as fellow post-punk bands such as Echo and the Bunnymen, the Teardrop Explodes, and Joy Division.

== Legacy ==
Many have said that the Sound were not given the recognition they deserved. Trouser Press questioned: "It's hard to understand why this London quartet never found commercial success. At their best, The Sound's excellent neo-pop bears favourable comparison to the Psychedelic Furs and Echo & the Bunnymen". Jack Rabid of The Big Takeover magazine stated: "The Sound? Just one of the finest bands of the 1980s." Chris Roberts of Uncut magazine wrote, "U2? Joy Division? Bunnymen? They pale in this band's shadow".

A biography of Adrian Borland, titled Book of (Happy) Memories (compiled by Willemien Spook and Jean-Paul van Mierlo) was published in 2001. In the same year, a tribute album titled In Passing – A Tribute to Adrian Borland and the Sound was released.

A film about Adrian Borland, Walking in the Opposite Direction, had its world premiere at the IDFA 2016. It was produced by Jean-Paul van Mierlo and filmmaker Marc Waltman. The film was screened worldwide in film festivals and released on DVD in 2021. The film is also available for rent or purchase on Vimeo.

A biography of Borland, Destiny Stopped Screaming: The Life and Times of Adrian Borland, written by Simon Heavisides, was released in April 2024.

== Members ==
- Adrian Borland – lead vocals, guitars (1979–1988, died 1999)
- Graham Bailey – bass, backing vocals (1979–1988)
- Michael "Mike" Dudley – drums, backing vocals (1979–1987)
- Bi Marshall – Keyboards, backing vocals (1979–1981)
- Colvin "Max" Mayers – keyboards, guitar, backing vocals (1981–1988, died 1993)

== Discography ==
=== Studio albums ===
| Year | Title | UK Indie | NZ | Label |
|---|---|---|---|---|
| 1980 | Jeopardy | - | 23 | Korova |
| 1981 | From the Lions Mouth | - | - | Korova |
| 1982 | All Fall Down | - | 50 | WEA |
| 1985 | Heads and Hearts | 23 | - | Statik Records |
| 1987 | Thunder Up | - | - | Play It Again Sam Records |
| 1999 | Propaganda | - | - | Renascent |

=== EPs ===
- Physical World E.P. (1979, Tortch Records)
- This Cover Keeps Reality Unreal with Kevin Hewick (1983. Cherry Red Records)
- Shock of Daylight (1984, Statik Records) #31 NZ
- Live Instinct (live) (1981, WEA)

=== Live albums ===
- In the Hothouse (1985, Statik Records)
- The BBC Recordings (2004, Renascent)
- The Dutch Radio Recordings 1. 08.03.81 Amsterdam, Paradiso (2006, Renascent)
- The Dutch Radio Recordings 2. 09.04.82 Utrecht, No Nukes Festival (2006, Renascent)
- The Dutch Radio Recordings 3. 24.01.83 Arnhem, Stokvishal (2006, Renascent)
- The Dutch Radio Recordings 4. 01.07.84 Den Haag, Parkpop Festival (2006, Renascent)
- The Dutch Radio Recordings 5. 09.04.85 Utrecht, Vrije Vloer (2006, Renascent)

=== Compilation albums ===
- Counting the Days (1986, Statik Records)
- Shock of Daylight & Heads and Hearts (1996, Renascent)
- Jeopardy / From the Lion's Mouth / All Fall Down...Plus box set (2014, Edsel Records)
- Shock of Daylight / Heads and Hearts / In the Hothouse (Live) / Thunder Up / Propaganda box set (2015, Edsel Records)
- New Way of Life: Demo Recordings (2023, Demon Music Group)
- Blood And Poison: Additional Studio Recordings (2023, Demon Music Group)

=== Singles ===
- "Heyday"/"Brute Force" (1980, Korova)
- "Sense of Purpose (What Are We Going to Do)"/"Point of No Return" (1981, Korova)
- "Hot House"/"New Dark Age" (live) (1982, Korova)
- "Party of the Mind"/"Calling the New Tune" (1982, WEA)
- "Counting the Days"/"Dreams Then Plans" (1984, Statik Records)
- "One Thousand Reasons"/"Blood and Poison" (1984, Statik Records)
- "Golden Soldiers"/"Counting the Days" (1984, Statik Records)
- "Temperature Drop"/"Oiled" (1985, Statik Records)
- "Under You"/"Total Recall" (1985, Statik Records)
- "Hand of Love"/"Such a Difference" (1987, Play It Again Sam Records)
- "Iron Years (Remix)"/"I Give You Pain (Live)" (1987, Play It Again Sam Records)
