= Calling on Youth =

Studio album by The Outsiders
- Released: May 1977
- Recorded: August–September 1976 and early 1977
- Studios: Raw Edge Studio; Pathway Studios, London
- Genre: Punk rock
- Label: Raw Edge
- Producer: The Outsiders

The Outsiders chronology
Calling on Youth (1977)	One to Infinity (1977)

Calling on Youth is the debut studio album by English punk rock band the Outsiders, led by vocalist/guitarist Adrian Borland, who would go on to form the Sound. It was released in May 1977 by record label Raw Edge.

== History ==
In 1973, Borland and school friends Adrian "Jan" Janes and Bob Lawrence had performed as Syndrome. The band played few gigs and primarily focused on recording their music onto cassettes at home. The band eventually changed their name to the Outsiders, and played gigs at The Roxy with bands such as Generation X, the Jam and the Vibrators.

== Background ==
Borland designed the album cover for Calling on Youth as well as coming up with the name for the album's record label, Raw Edge. Calling on Youth was mainly recorded in the Borland family home from August to September 1976. engineering was handled by Adrian's father, Bob. Further tracks were recorded or re-recorded in early 1977 at Pathway Studios.

== Track listing ==
All tracks are written by Adrian Borland.

Side A
No.	Title	Length
1.	"Calling on Youth"	2:17
2.	"Break Free"	4:00
3.	"On the Edge"	3:40
4.	"Hit and Run"	2:34
5.	"Start Over"	5:21

Side B
No.	Title	Length
1.	"Weird"	4:09
2.	"I'm Screwed Up"	5:17
3.	"Walking Through a Storm"	5:07
4.	"Terminal Case"	3:01

== Release ==
Released in May 1977, Calling on Youth is considered by some to be the first punk LP independently issued in Britain. The record label on which the album was released, Raw Edge, was set up by frontman Borland's parents. Not all the costs of producing the album were recouped.

== Critical reception ==
Professional ratings
Review scores
Source	Rating
AllMusic	3.5/5 stars
NME	negative
Sounds	unfavourable

Calling on Youth was poorly received by critics. Sounds described the album as "terribly premature".

== Personnel ==
- Adrian Borland – vocals, guitar, production
- Bob Lawrence – bass guitar, production
- Adrian Janes – drums, production

Technical

- Bob Borland – engineering
- Chas Herington – engineering
