= All Fall Down (The Sound album) =

Studio album by the Sound
- Released: October 1982
- Recorded: March 1982; August 1982
- Studio: The Manor, Oxfordshire; Trident, London, England
- Genre: Post-punk
- Length: 41:25
- Label: WEA
- Producer: The Sound; Nick Robbins

The Sound chronology
| From the Lions Mouth (1981) | All Fall Down (1982) | Shock of Daylight (1984) |

All Fall Down is the third studio album by the English post-punk band the Sound, recorded from March to August 1982 and released in October 1982 on record label WEA.

After being pressured by their record label to release a more commercially successful album, since their previous records failed to attract the attention of the public, the Sound rebelled and recorded All Fall Down, which has been called "distinctly uncommercial".

The album was poorly received by critics and led to the termination of the Sound's contract with WEA. No singles were released from the album.

== Background ==
On the album, Andy Kellman of AllMusic opined, "there was no attempt at making a hit. [...] The Sound responded to label demands and simmering internal pressures with a record that challenged devout fans as well." Drummer Mike Dudley said of the album:

We thought [the label wasn't] giving us the support that we were due and that if they really wanted a commercial album, they had got to put plenty of money behind it, which with both Jeopardy and From the Lions Mouth they hadn't really done [...] So when they turned around and said, 'The solution is for you to write more commercial songs', we thought, 'Fuck you', and went ahead and produced All Fall Down.

== Release ==
All Fall Down was released on 23 October 1982. No singles were released from the album. It failed to chart in the UK and received a negative response from critics. WEA were displeased with the album and decided not to promote it, and the Sound's contract with them was terminated.

== Reception ==
Professional ratings
Review scores
| Source | Rating |
|---|---|
| AllMusic | 3.5/5 stars |
| Smash Hits | 4/10 |
| Sounds | 3/5 stars |

All Fall Down received a negative critical reception upon its release. Johnny Waller of Sounds panned the album, writing, "This is the album The Sound should never have made, didn't need to make, could have made in their sleep [...] [it] adds virtually nothing to the minimalist passion of Jeopardy and the following, more impressively structured From the Lions Mouth and, as such, is virtually worthless", concluding the review with "Look in the mirror, Adrian, before you all fall down".

A favourable review came from Trouser Press, which said, "The black, clashing music makes the challenging LP an acquired taste, an ambitious, admirable exploration of the downside". In his retrospective review of the album, Peter Parrish of Stylus Magazine was very positive, opining that "All Fall Down can make a realistic claim to being their best [album]".

== Track listing ==
All tracks are written by the Sound (Adrian Borland, Graham Green, Max Mayers and Mike Dudley), except where noted.

Side A
| No. | Title | Writer(s) | Length |
|---|---|---|---|
| 1. | "All Fall Down" | | 2:28 |
| 2. | "Party of the Mind" | Borland | 3:57 |
| 3. | "Monument" | Borland | 5:08 |
| 4. | "In Suspense" | | 4:05 |
| 5. | "Where the Love Is" | | 4:09 |

Side B
| No. | Title | Writer(s) | Length |
|---|---|---|---|
| 1. | "Song and Dance" | | 3:55 |
| 2. | "Calling the New Tune" | | 3:30 |
| 3. | "Red Paint" | | 3:15 |
| 4. | "Glass and Smoke" | | 6:54 |
| 5. | "We Could Go Far" | Borland, Adrian Janes | 4:04 |

CD bonus tracks
| No. | Title | Length |
|---|---|---|
| 11. | "The One and a Half Minute Song" | 1:32 |
| 12. | "Sorry" | 3:47 |
| 13. | "As Feeling Dies" | 4:37 |

== Charts ==
| Chart (1983) | Peak position |
|---|---|
| New Zealand Albums (RMNZ) | 50 |

| Chart (2024) | Peak position |
|---|---|
| Portuguese Albums (AFP) | 104 |

== Personnel ==
The Sound

- Adrian Borland – vocals, guitar, production
- Graham Green – bass guitar, sound effects, drum machine programming, percussion, production
- Max Mayers – keyboards, production
- Mike Dudley – drums, percussion, production

Additional personnel

- Manor Choir – backing vocals on "All Fall Down"
- Craig Milliner – engineering
- Flood – engineering
- Steve Prestage – engineering
- Bill Smith – sleeve artwork design
- Andrew Douglas – sleeve photography
- Nick Robbins – production
