= White Rose Transmission =

- Years active: 1995–present
- Labels: Strange Ways, Fuego
- Past members: Adrian Borland; Carlo van Putten; Claudia Uman; Florian Bratmann; David Maria Gramse

White Rose Transmission is a musical project that initially consisted of Adrian Borland and vocalist Carlo van Putten. It started in 1995 when Adrian Borland (The Sound) started working together with a singer Carlo van Putten (Dead Guitars & The Convent). They released two albums before the sudden death of Adrian Borland on 26 April 1999. In 2006, Carlo van Putten invited his friend Rob Keijzer to join in and to carry on this project along with David Maria Gramse and Florian Bratmann, who also played on the first two albums. They recorded the album Bewitched & Bewildered with Marty Willson-Piper performing on the bonus tracks "Martha's Harbour" and "Circle". In 2008, a fourth album, Spiders in the Mind Web was recorded, mixed and produced by Frank Weyzig (former member of Clan of Xymox) who joined the project on guitars.

The project has never stopped; it has continued whenever the time was right to create something new. Many different artists have joined the WRT family. Van Putten went on tour with Amanda Palmer of The Dresden Dolls in 2000 supporting The Chameleons UK. In addition to Kurt Schmidt (Twelve Drummers Drumming), the cast currently includes Robert Smeekes and Thomas Marcin formerly from the Dutch band Aestrid. Van Putten regularly goes on living room tours through Europe with the latter.

== Discography ==
- White Rose Transmission (1995, Indigo, Strange Ways)
- 700 Miles of Desert (1999, Fuego, Red Sun Records)
- Presence (1999, no label)
- Bewitched & Bewildered (2006, Pop One Records)
- Spiders in the Mind Web (7 May 2010, Echozone)
- Spinning Webs at Night (2011, Echozone)
- Happiness at last (2020, Sireena)
