= Alexandria (album) =

Studio album by Adrian Borland & the Citizens
- Released: 1989
- Recorded: January–February 1989
- Studio: Elephant
- Genre: Rock
- Label: Play It Again Sam
- Producer: Adrian Borland, Nick Robbins

Alexandria is the debut album by English musician Adrian Borland, credited to Adrian Borland & the Citizens. It was released in 1989 by record label Play It Again Sam.

== Reception ==
Professional ratings
Review scores
Source	Rating
AllMusic	3/5 stars

In its retrospective review, Trouser Press wrote: "Borland's subsequent solo career got off to a good start with Alexandria, as he brings a variety of moods to the alternately austere, sensuous and lighthearted pop, revealing a mild Velvet Underground influence."

== Track listing ==
No.	Title	Length
1.	"Light the Sky"	2:40
2.	"Rogue Beauty"	3:15
3.	"Beneath the Big Wheel"	4:20
4.	"Community Call"	3:22
5.	"No Ethereal"	4:40
6.	"Other Side of the World"	3:14
7.	"Crystalline"	4:40
8.	"Shadow of Your Grace"	3:51
9.	"Weight of Stuff"	3:20
10.	"She's My Heroine"	4:12
11.	"Deep Deep Blue"	4:49
