= Second Layer =

British post-punk band

- Genres: Post-punk
- Years active: 1979–1981
- Labels: Tortch-R, Cherry Red
- Spinoff of: The Sound
- Past members: Adrian Borland; Graham Bailey

Second Layer were an English post-punk band formed in 1979 by Adrian Borland (vocals, guitar) and Graham Bailey (keyboards, bass guitar, drum programming), both members of the Sound.

== History ==
The duo's first release was the Flesh as Property EP, released in 1979 by Tortch-R Records. This was followed by another EP the following year, State of Emergency. The band's only studio album, World of Rubber, was released in 1981 by Cherry Red Records.

Borland died on 26 April 1999.

In 2015, Dark Entries Records reissued the band's entire discography, augmented by five unreleased demo tracks, as the World of Rubber collection.

== Musical style ==
Andy Kellman of AllMusic wrote that the band "retained some of [the] feel" of the Sound, "albeit in a slightly detached fashion that's to be expected when synths and drum machines replace more human elements".

In a 2015 retrospective review, The Quietus said, "The first thing that's noticeable on listening to World of Rubber is how utterly different the sound and aesthetic of Second Layer is compared to that of The Sound. While The Sound had songs of gloomy introspection and a sweeping romanticism, Second Layer strips all of that away, leaving in its place a monochrome worldview morbidly obsessed with the dehumanising effect of war, nuclear weapon annihilation, and the fracturing and negation of the self within an increasingly distorted and technologically mediated society."

== Discography ==
Studio albums

- World of Rubber (1981, Cherry Red Records)

EPs

- Flesh as Property E.P. (1979, Tortch Records)
- State of Emergency E.P. (1980, Tortch Records)

Compilation albums

- World of Rubber (2015, Dark Entries Records)
