= Honolulu Mountain Daffodils =

UK musical group

- Origin: United Kingdom
- Genres: Indie rock
- Labels: Hybrid Records, Zinger Records, Area International, Mission Discs
- Past members: Joachim Pimento; Zoe Zettner; Lord Sulaco; Daiquiri J. Wright; Franklin Silverheels; Smoky Alvaro

The Honolulu Mountain Daffodils were a British indie rock band formed in the late 1980s. They released three full-length albums, one EP and one single between 1987 and 1991.

Honolulu Mountain Daffodils were described by AllMusic as "A scatterbrained and perhaps drunken recording entity" and consisted of members likely all using pseudonyms: guitarist Joachim Pimento (Adrian Borland), guitarist-keyboardist Zoe Zettner, guitarist-vocalist Lord Sulaco, guitarist-percussionist Daiquiri J. Wright, guitarist Franklin Silverheels and bassist Smoky Alvaro.

== Legacy ==
The band have been cited as an influence on Spacemen 3's Peter Kember.

== Discography ==
Studio albums

- Guitars of the Oceanic Undergrowth (1987, Hybrid Records)
- Tequila Dementia (1988, Zinger Records)
- Aloha Sayonara (1991, Mission Discs)

EPs

- Psychic Hit-List Victims (1991, Mission Discs)

Singles

- "Also Sprächt Scott Thurston" (1988, Area International)

Compilation albums

- Guitars of the Oceanic Undergrowth/Tequila Dementia (1992, Mission Discs)
