= From the Lions Mouth =

Studio album by the Sound
- Released: November 1981
- Recorded: 1981
- Studios: Rockfield (Rockfield, Wales)
- Genres: Post-punk, gothic rock
- Length: 41:59
- Label: Korova
- Producers: The Sound; Hugh Jones

The Sound chronology
Jeopardy (1980)	From the Lions Mouth (1981)	All Fall Down (1982)

Singles from From the Lions Mouth
- 1. "Sense of Purpose (What Are We Going to Do)" Released: 20 September 1981

From the Lions Mouth is the second studio album by the English post-punk band the Sound, released in November 1981 on record label Korova. Following the release of their previous album Jeopardy, keyboardist Belinda "Bi" Marshall left the group and was replaced by Colvin "Max" Mayers. For their new album, the Sound worked with producer Hugh Jones, as well as co-producing the album themselves. The album's sound was more polished than previous efforts.

Like Jeopardy, From the Lions Mouth was critically acclaimed but failed to capture the attention of the public, with the band's fanbase limited to a cult following. One single, "Sense of Purpose (What Are We Going to Do)", was released.

== Content ==
The album cover artwork was taken from the 1872 painting Daniel in the Lion's Den by Briton Rivière.

NME compared the album's bleak nature to Joy Division's Closer. Despite The Sound being posited as a gloomy band, AllMusic wrote, "snake-charming opener 'Winning' is like a dash of cold water in the faces of all the bands that were wallowing and withering away at the weeping well [...] The Sound were not mopes. They had their problems with life, but rather than just vent or escape from them, they confront them and ask questions and attempt to sort it all out."

== Release ==
One single, "Sense of Purpose (What Are We Going to Do)", was released in promotion for the album, on 20 September 1981. From the Lions Mouth was released in November by record label Korova.

The album was remastered and re-released in 2002 by Renascent, a record label formed specifically for the task of reissuing the Sound's records. This release included the 1982 single "Hothouse", despite frontman Adrian Borland's wishes that the album should have the same track listing as the original. The song was not included as a separate track, but as a continuation of "New Dark Age".

== Critical reception ==
Professional ratings
Review scores
Source	Rating
AllMusic	4.5/5 stars
Record Mirror	4/5 stars
Smash Hits	5/10
Uncut	5/5 stars

From the Lions Mouth was well received by critics upon its release. Mike Nicholls of Record Mirror wrote, "The Sound seem set to take up where Joy Division left off and become the saviors of the adolescent grim brigade." Melody Maker's Steve Sutherland commented on the album's lighter, more commercial tone than that of Jeopardy, calling it "Jeopardy-as-palatable-product." NME critic Andy Gill noted themes of "individualism and collectivism" in the album's songs, which he said "are infused with a certainty of individuality and apartness – and all that that entails – but well aware of the need for coming-together in an era which has seen apartness emphasized to lethal levels."

In its retrospective article "Unspun Heroes", NME praised the album as "underrated" and a "ferocious, vital document." Uncut described it as "a monumental work of rock 'n' roll angst" and The Sound's greatest album, while Trouser Press cited it as the group's best work. Jack Rabid of The Big Takeover commented that the album "established the foursome as a formidable band for the ages."

Borland described From the Lions Mouth as "the most polished and probably our most commercial album, with some of the greatest songs".

== Track listing ==
Side A
No.	Title	Writer(s)	Length
1.	"Winning"	Adrian Borland; Max Mayers; Graham Green; Michael Dudley	4:18
2.	"Sense of Purpose"	Borland; Mayers; Green; Dudley	3:52
3.	"Contact the Fact"	Borland; Mayers; Green	4:21
4.	"Skeletons"	Borland; Benita Biltoo; Green; Dudley	3:27
5.	"Judgement"	Borland; Mayers; Green	5:03

Side B
No.	Title	Writer(s)	Length
1.	"Fatal Flaw"	Borland; Mayers; Green; Dudley	4:36
2.	"Possession"	Borland; Adrian Janes	3:25
3.	"The Fire"	Borland; Mayers; Green; Dudley	2:53
4.	"Silent Air"	Borland	4:14
5.	"New Dark Age"	Borland	5:49

== Personnel ==
The Sound

- Adrian Borland – vocals, guitar, production
- Michael Dudley – drums, percussion, production
- Graham Green – bass guitar, production
- Max Mayers – keyboards, production

Technical

- Hugh Jones – production, engineering
- Briton Rivière – album cover artwork
- Howard Hughes – album cover concept
- Julian Mendelsohn – engineering
- Simon Fowler – sleeve liner photo photography

== Charts ==
Chart performance for From the Lions Mouth
Chart (2025)	Peak position
Croatian International Albums (HDU)	28
Greek Albums (IFPI)	64
Portuguese Albums (AFP)	31
