= The Outsiders (British band) =

English punk rock band

- Also known as: Syndrome (1975)
- Origin: Wimbledon, England
- Genres: Punk rock
- Years active: 1975–1979
- Spinoffs: The Sound
- Past members: Adrian Borland; Bob Lawrence; Adrian Janes

The Outsiders were an English punk rock group, formed in 1975 in Wimbledon, England and consisting of singer-guitarist Adrian Borland, bass guitarist Bob Lawrence and drummer Adrian "Jan" Janes. In 1978 Graham "Green" Bailey replaced Lawrence at the bass and then he and Borland would go on to form the critically successful post-punk band the Sound. However, in sharp contrast with them, The Outsiders’ music received generally negative reviews regarding the context of their music.

== History ==
The Outsiders formed in Wimbledon, London, England in 1975 . They were originally called "Syndrome" but changed their name to the Outsiders in 1976, inspired by Albert Camus' novel The Outsider.

Their debut studio album, Calling on Youth, was self-released on their Raw Edge label in May 1977, and won them unfavourable reviews: "Apple-cheeked Ade has a complexion that would turn a Devon milkmaid green with envy", reported Julie Burchill of the New Musical Express. It was the first self-released punk album in the UK.

The band released an EP in November 1977, One to Infinity. NME writer Tony Parsons commented: "tuneless, gormless, gutless... I like them a lot". The EP was praised in a less contradictory manner by other critics, including Mick Mercer.

A second album, Close Up, was released in 1979. This received better, but still cautious, reviews from the press. A NME review concluded that it was a patchy album, but from "a band with a future".

After this album, Lawrence and Janes left, and Borland went on to front the critically successful post-punk group the Sound.

Borland died 26 April 1999.

In 1993, Three Lines Records issued the Vital Years compilation.

== Discography ==
=== Studio albums ===
- Calling on Youth (1977, Raw Edge Records)
- Close Up (1978, Raw Edge Records)

=== EPs ===
- One to Infinity (1977, Raw Edge Records)

=== Compilation albums ===
- Vital Years (1993, Three Lines Records)
- Count For Something (2021, Cherry Red Records) [5xCD box set]
