= One to Infinity =

EP by The Outsiders
- Released: 1977
- Genre: Punk rock

The Outsiders chronology
Calling on Youth (1977)	One to Infinity (1977)	Close Up (1978)

One to Infinity (stylised as 1 → ∞) is an EP and the second release by English punk rock band the Outsiders, released in 1977.

== Reception ==
Professional ratings
Review scores
Source	Rating
Mick Mercer	favourable
NME	uncertain

One to Infinity received mixed-to-favourable reviews from critics.

Tony Parsons, writing for NME, gave an ambiguous review, writing: "Tuneless, gormless, gutless. [...] The Outsiders are obese midgets who wear bicycle clips on their flairs [sic] because they think it makes them look punky. I like them a lot. It takes real punks to make a record like this". Journalist Mick Mercer was more positive: "Soon many people will find the effort of posing too great an effort, and will admit just how good The Outsiders are. Simply for having long hair they suffered bad reviews. [...] [they] deserve to be accepted as the Boomtowns, Tom Robinson, Saints have been".
