= Heads and Hearts =

Studio album by the Sound
- Released: February 1985
- Recorded: November 1984
- Studio: Townhouse, London, England
- Genre: Post-punk
- Length: 41:38
- Label: Statik
- Producer: The Sound; Wally Brill

The Sound chronology
Shock of Daylight (1984)	Heads and Hearts (1985)	Thunder Up (1987)

Singles from Heads and Hearts
- 1. "One Thousand Reasons" Released: 1984; 2. "Temperature Drop" Released: 1985; 3. "Under You" Released: 1985

Heads and Hearts is the fourth studio album by English post-punk band the Sound, recorded in late 1984 and released in February 1985 by record label Statik.

Three singles were released from the album: "One Thousand Reasons", "Temperature Drop" and "Under You".

== Background ==
Heads and Hearts was recorded in November 1984 at Townhouse Studios in London.

Andy Kellman of AllMusic opined that the album saw the group "riding the wave of optimism—or maybe it would be better to say enthusiasm or vigor—that shot through them as they found themselves revitalized after parting ways with a major label", citing the album's "sweepingly hopeful sensibility", despite calling the album's first track "one of the Sound's weariest, most exasperated-with-the-rigors-of-existence songs in their quiver".

== Release ==
The first single from the album was "One Thousand Reasons", released in 1984.

Heads and Hearts was released in 1985 by Statik Records. Two more singles followed, "Temperature Drop" and "Under You".

The album was remastered and reissued in 1996 by Renascent along with the preceding Shock of Daylight EP.

== Reception ==
Professional ratings
Review scores
Source	Rating
AllMusic	3.5/5 stars
Sounds	5/5 stars

Heads and Hearts was modestly received by critics. Trouser Press called the album "even better" than the Shock of Daylight EP, writing that "the record's modesty and continuous flow make it a thoroughly engaging listen".

The Sound drummer Michael Dudley, on the other hand, later qualified the album as "a real low point – drab, lifeless and miserable".

== Track listing ==
All lyrics are written by Adrian Borland, except "Wildest Dreams", by Borland and Adrian Janes.

Side A
No.	Title	Writer(s)	Length
1.	"Whirlpool"	Borland, Graham Bailey	4:00
2.	"Total Recall"	Borland, Michael Dudley, Bailey, Colvin Mayers	4:29
3.	"Under You"	Borland, Dudley, Bailey, Mayers	4:18
4.	"Burning Part of Me"	Borland, Dudley, Bailey, Mayers	3:26
5.	"Love Is Not a Ghost"	Borland	4:14

Side B
No.	Title	Writer(s)	Length
1.	"Wildest Dreams"	Borland, Dudley, Bailey, Mayers, Janes	5:13
2.	"One Thousand Reasons"	Borland	3:04
3.	"Restless Time"	Borland, Mayers, Bailey	3:39
4.	"Mining for Heart"	Borland	2:48
5.	"World As It Is"	Borland, Dudley, Bailey, Mayers	2:07
6.	"Temperature Drop"	Borland, Bailey	4:20

== Personnel ==
The Sound

- Adrian Borland – vocals, guitar
- Michael Dudley – drums
- Graham Bailey – bass
- Colvin Mayers – keyboards, guitar

Additional personnel

- Ian Nelson – saxophone on "Whirlpool", "Under You" and "Love Is Not a Ghost"
- Gavin MacKillop – engineering
- Richard Manwaring – engineering
- Simon Smart – engineering
- Ben Kape – engineering assistance
- Nick Collins – engineering assistance
- Steven Chase – engineering assistance
- Wally Brill – production
- 23 Envelope – sleeve design
