= Jeopardy (album) =

1980 studio album by The Sound

Studio album by the Sound
- Released: November 1980
- Recorded: 1980
- Studio: Elephant, Wapping, London
- Genre: Post-punk
- Length: 38:23
- Label: Korova
- Producer: Nick Robbins; the Sound

The Sound chronology
Jeopardy (1980)	From the Lions Mouth (1981)

Singles from Jeopardy
- 1. "Heyday" Released: September 1980

Jeopardy is the debut studio album by the English post-punk band the Sound. It was released in November 1980 through the record label Korova. The band had previously made their recording debut with the 1979 EP Physical World before signing with the label and recording this album.

The album fared poorly commercially, only reaching No. 23 in New Zealand, but received critical acclaim. One single, "Heyday", was released from the album. Today it is regarded as a cult classic in the post-punk genre.

== Background ==
Following their 1979 EP Physical World, the band started work on a full-length album. Impressed by the rough mixes, Korova signed the group. Jeopardy was recorded inexpensively at Elephant Studios in London, and was produced by the Sound themselves and Nick Robbins. Adrian Janes, ex-member of the Outsiders along with Sound frontman Adrian Borland and Bob Lawrence, contributed writing to two tracks, despite not being a member of the Sound.

Regarding the album, drummer Michael Dudley said:

I felt I had really achieved something in my life. I couldn't wait to hand out copies to family and friends [...] It was the most fun to record and the biggest challenge to work on in the studio [of all the Sound's albums].

== Release ==
The album was preceded by the release of the single "Heyday" in September 1980. The single was well received in the press, with Dave McCullough of Sounds calling the song "one of the most exciting and most astonishingly adept big label debut singles I've heard since the Jam's 'In the City'".

Jeopardy was released in November 1980. It was lauded by critics upon its release, but fared poorly commercially, failing to chart in the UK and with the band's fanbase failing to expand further than a cult following.

The album was re-released in 2002 by Renascent with the Live Instinct EP included. The EP contains four tracks recorded live at a show at The Venue in London on 14 January 1981.

== Reception ==
Professional ratings
Review scores
Source	Rating
AllMusic	4.5/5 stars
Melody Maker	5/5 stars
NME	5/5 stars
Record Mirror	4/5 stars
Smash Hits	8½/10
Sounds	5/5 stars
Uncut	4/5 stars

Jeopardy was critically lauded, and received full 5-star reviews from three major music publications: NME, Sounds and Melody Maker. Steve Sutherland of Melody Maker wrote: "Jeopardy is one of those records that makes me want to throw all the windows open, crank it up to full volume and blast it out to the world. It clears my head of boredom, strips away the gloom and single-handedly restores my belief in the power of pop to make people stop, think and question. [...] Jeopardy has got more spirit, more soul and more downright honesty about it than any other record I've heard this year".

In a retrospective review, Andy Kellman of AllMusic called Jeopardy "a caustic jolt of a debut that startles and fascinates". PopMatters critic Devon Powers said the album revealed "startling maturity and skill", while Trouser Press remarked that it "has a stark, beautiful quality, with the material given direct exposure rather than a production bath".

Brendan Perry of the Australian musical group Dead Can Dance has praised the album, calling it an "Existentialist post punk jewel".

== Track listing ==
Side A
No.	Title	Writer(s)	Length
1.	"I Can't Escape Myself"	Adrian Borland	3:55
2.	"Heartland"	Borland	3:34
3.	"Hour of Need"	Borland; Graham Bailey; Michael Dudley	3:03
4.	"Words Fail Me"	Borland; Adrian Janes	2:59
5.	"Missiles"	Borland	5:28

Side B
No.	Title	Writer(s)	Length
1.	"Heyday"	Borland	3:03
2.	"Jeopardy"	Borland; Bi Marshall; Bailey; Dudley	3:38
3.	"Night Versus Day"	Borland; Janes; Bailey	3:16
4.	"Resistance"	Borland	2:48
5.	"Unwritten Law"	Borland; Bailey	3:40
6.	"Desire"	Borland	3:14

Renascent 2001 reissue bonus tracks (Live Instinct EP)
No.	Title	Length
1.	"Heartland" (live)	3:20
2.	"Brute Force" (live)	4:07
3.	"Jeopardy" (live)	3:47
4.	"Coldbeat" (live)	4:10

== Charts ==
Chart (1980)	Peak position
New Zealand Albums (RMNZ)	23

Chart (2024)	Peak position
Portuguese Albums (AFP)	90

== Personnel ==
The Sound

- Adrian Borland – vocals, guitar, production
- Michael Dudley – drums, production
- Green (Graham Bailey) – bass guitar, production
- Belinda "Bi" Marshall – keyboard, production

Technical

- Nick Robbins – production
- Sara Batho – sleeve artwork
- Spencer Rowell – sleeve photography
