= The Big Takeover =

American music magazine established in 1980

- Editor-in-Chief: Jack Rabid
- Categories: Music; Entertainment
- Frequency: Bi-annually
- First issue: 1980
- Country: United States
- Based in: New York City, New York
- Language: English
- Website: bigtakeover.com

The Big Takeover is a bi-annual music magazine published in New York City since May 1980 by critic Jack Rabid.

== History ==
=== Establishment ===
Jack Rabid and Dave Stein began publishing The Big Takeover in May 1980 as a fanzine dedicated to New York punk band the Stimulators. The pair had formed a garage band the previous month called Even Worse, originally playing mainly punk rock cover songs. Even Worse was quickly tapped to open a show for the Stimulators, and the publication followed. Rabid, an intense music fan, ended up taking over the project, which evolved into a general punk rock fanzine.

In a 1983 Flipside interview, Rabid recalled:

"I'm a genuine fanatic, there's probably a good 3 or 4 or 5 in every city. Just love the music, that's all it is, I love the music. i try to find every record that was ever made, I like making tapes for people to expose them to what they missed. Punk was always creativity to me and expression and it still is to some degree only you have to dig harder.... I just try to support things that I like and those are the things that took time and effort, practice, you know. If you really care then eventually you will make something that is really good".

The title of the fanzine was taken from a Bad Brains song. The first issue was a one-pager, printed front and back, photocopied and given out for free at local punk shows. Stein left the fanzine to Rabid after one issue and Rabid has remained the dominant creative force behind the magazine since.

=== From fanzine to magazine ===
The Big Takeover moved from the more primitive fanzine style to the black-and-white, stapled magazine style around issue 26 in 1989. During this period, Rabid worked during the day and was still doing most of the writing and all of the layout work and advertising sales. Other notable contributors to the magazine in the early days included former MTV personality Tim Sommer. During the first half of the 1990s, The Big Takeover began using professional layout design, and by the end of the decade, had become a semi-glossy color magazine. Circulation is currently around 15,000.

=== Design ===
The Big T usually appears in June and December (a subscription is for two years, at two issues per year), with most recent issues coming in around 200 pages. The review section, featuring Rabid's Top 40 for the issue, is regularly 60-80 pages long. The magazine also features lengthy, in-depth interviews with favorite artists transcribed verbatim, sometimes stretching over two issues. In 2006, the magazine relocated to Brooklyn from the apartment at 249 Eldridge Street on the Lower East Side of Manhattan that was home to the magazine for 25 years.

Rabid is known for championing what he calls "Music with Heart". This could consist of any kind of music that requires attention, regardless of trends or popularity, which results in the magazine covering a diverse mixture of independent and major label bands from punk to electronica to slowcore. The magazine has been criticized for having a limited scope, mostly because of Rabid's personal dislike of hip-hop.

=== Multimedia ===
In 2003, Rabid and longtime Big Takeover contributor Jeff Kelson launched Pink Frost/Big Takeover Records, initially releasing two albums: former Guided by Voices guitarist Doug Gillard's first solo album, Salamander, and Last Burning Embers' Lessons in Redemption, featuring Rabid on drums. The label has continued to sporadically release albums, mostly by New York-area groups, as well as distribute albums that are not in print in the U.S., such as Don McGlashan's Warm Hands.

In 2005, The Big Takeover launched a redesigned website featuring contributors' blogs, top 10 lists and a large forum area. The website was relaunched with a new design and organization in July 2010.

=== Anniversary concerts ===
"The Big Takeover" celebrated its 30th anniversary with a two-day music festival in July 2010 at The Bell House, a venue in Park Slope, Brooklyn. For Against, Mark Burgess and the Avengers were among the acts who appeared.

An earlier Big Takeover anniversary party in April 2001 at Giorgio Gomelsky's in Manhattan featured a rare live performance from Alternative TV.
