= And All the Pieces Matter =

And All the Pieces Matter - Five Years of Music from The Wire

Soundtrack album by Various artists
- Released: January 8, 2008
- Length: 74:33
- Label: Nonesuch

Professional ratings
Review scores
Source	Rating
Pitchfork Media	(6.6/10)
Allmusic	4/5 stars

And All the Pieces Matter - Five Years of Music from The Wire is a soundtrack album for the HBO television show The Wire, that was released on January 8, 2008.

== Track listing ==
No.	Title	Writer(s)	Artist	Length
1.	"This America, man"			0:25
2.	"Way Down in the Hole"	Waits	The Blind Boys of Alabama	2:56
3.	"Why would anyone ever wanna leave Baltimore?"			0:24
4.	"Oh My God"	Franti	Michael Franti & Spearhead	5:06
5.	"Dance My Pain Away"	Lee	Rod Lee	2:07
6.	"My Life Extra"	Brand	DJ Technics	1:17
7.	"The king stay the king"			0:47
8.	"Way Down in the Hole"	Waits	The Neville Brothers	1:34
9.	"We used to make shit in this country"			0:14
10.	"Sixteen Tons"	Travis	The Nighthawks	3:33
11.	"Assume the Position"	Gilchrist	Lafayette Gilchrist	3:40
12.	"What the fuck did I do?"			0:13
13.	"Step by Step"	Winchester	Jesse Winchester	2:53
14.	"I Walk on Gilded Splinters"	Rebennack	Paul Weller	4:58
15.	"Fast Train"	Morrison	Solomon Burke	5:38
16.	"The Body of an American"	MacGowan	The Pogues	4:44
17.	"All the pieces matter"			0:08
18.	"Efuge Efuge"	Vassiliadis	Stelios Kazantzidis	3:33
19.	"Omar Comin'!"			0:40
20.	"Way Down in the Hole"	Waits	DoMaJe	1:43
21.	"If it’s a lie, then we fight on that lie"			0:21
22.	"Projects"	Morehead, Darkroom Productions	Tyree Colion	3:28
23.	"Later for that gangsta bullshit"			0:38
24.	"Ayo"	Hill/Holifield/Shelton	Bossman	3:19
25.	"Analyze"		SharpShootaz	2:44
26.	"Wars end"			0:14
27.	"Unfriendly Game"	Clear	Masta Ace	3:52
28.	"What You Know About Baltimore"		Ogun feat. Phathead	3:17
29.	"Jail Flick"	Champ, Darkroom Productions	Diablo	3:38
30.	"The Life, the Hood, the Streetz"	Muldrow	Mullyman	3:49
31.	"An act of daily journalism"			0:13
32.	"I Feel Alright"	Earle	Steve Earle	2:56
33.	"Way Down in the Hole"	Waits	Tom Waits	1:44
34.	"You remember the one day summer past?"			0:41
35.	"The Fall"	Leyh	Blake Leyh	1:50
Total length:				79:17

== Personnel ==
- Ivan Ashford – vocals
- Avery Bargasse – vocals
- Karina Benznicki – production supervisor
- James Bevelle – engineer, mixing
- David Bither – executive producer
- Cameron Brown – vocals
- Andre Burke – violin
- Greg Calbi – mastering
- Eli Cane – production coordination
- Milton Davis – producer
- Michael Franti – producer
- Ronen Givony – editorial coordinator
- Loren Hill – producer
- Andy Kris – mixing
- Rod Lee – producer
- Blake Leyh – mixing, producer
- James Mbah – producer
- Ivan Neville – producer
- Nina K. Noble – producer
- Mike Potter – engineer
- Richard Shelton – producer
- David Simon – executive producer
- Karen L. Thorson – producer
- Louis Tineo – producer
- Jamal Roberts - producer
- Juan Donovan - producer
- Doreen Vail – arranger, producer
