= Stay Human =

Stay Human may refer to:

- Stay Human (band), a band founded by American musician Jon Batiste
- Stay Human (album), a 2001 studio album by Michael Franti & Spearhead
- Dying Light 2: Stay Human, a 2022 video game
