= Everyone Deserves Music (song) =

Single by Michael Franti & Spearhead

from the album Everyone Deserves Music
- Released: 2003
- Genre: Alternative rock, art rock
- Length: 4:36
- Songwriters: Michael Franti, D. Shul & C. Young

"Everyone Deserves Music" is a single by Michael Franti & Spearhead from their album Everyone Deserves Music.

The song was ranked #34 on Triple J's Hottest 100 for 2003.

== Track listings ==
Australian CD Single

1. "Everyone Deserves Music" (edit) – 3:43
2. "Feelin' Free" (clothing optional mix) – 4:26
3. Taxi Radio – 3:46
4. Enhanced Computer Section (CD-ROM)

UK CD Single

1. "Everyone Deserves Music" (Original)
2. "Everyone Deserves Music" (Frequency 3 Remix by J Bowman)
3. "Feelin' Free" (Clothing Optional Mix) - 4:26
4. "What I Be" (Jonah Sharp Remix)

== Official versions ==
- "Everyone Deserves Music" (Album Version) - 4:36
- "Everyone Deserves Music" (Edit) - 3:43
- "Everyone Deserves Music" (Frequency 3 Remix by J Bowman)

== Chart performance ==
Chart (2003)	Peak position
Australia (ARIA)	39
Netherlands (Single Top 100)	69
