= Hypocrisy Is the Greatest Luxury =

Studio album by the Disposable Heroes of Hiphoprisy
- Released: March 3, 1992
- Genre: Industrial hip-hop
- Length: 62:32
- Labels: 4th & B'way, Island, PolyGram
- Producer: Michael Franti

The Disposable Heroes of Hiphoprisy chronology
Hypocrisy Is the Greatest Luxury (1992)	Spare Ass Annie and Other Tales (1993)

Hypocrisy Is the Greatest Luxury is the debut album by alternative hip-hop crew the Disposable Heroes of Hiphoprisy, released in 1992. Hypocrisy Is the Greatest Luxury was met with critical acclaim.

"Television, the Drug of the Nation" was released as a single. It was recorded previously by Michael Franti's first band, the Beatnigs.

== Critical reception ==
Professional ratings
Review scores
Source	Rating
AllMusic	4/5 stars
Chicago Tribune	3/4 stars
Drowned in Sound	10/10
The Encyclopedia of Popular Music	4/5 stars
Los Angeles Times	3/4 stars
Q	4/5 stars
Rolling Stone	3.5/5 stars
Select	4/5
Spin Alternative Record Guide	8/10
The Village Voice	A−

In a contemporary review for The Village Voice, music critic Robert Christgau said that, although some of the ideas and metaphors are unconvincing, Michael Franti's "intellectual grasp thrusts him immediately into pop's front rank". He also praised DJ Rono Tse as "a one-man hip hop band" who, with the help of percussionist Mark Pistel, "creates more music than he samples, stretching Bomb Squad parameters to carry the tracks whenever Franti falters." Hypocrisy Is the Greatest Luxury finished number 19 in The Village Voice's Pazz & Jop critics' poll. Christgau, the poll's creator, ranked it number 14 in his own list.

In a retrospective review, AllMusic's Ned Raggett said that the group "tackled every last big issue possible with one of 1992's most underrated efforts." He felt that, while its mix of "Bomb Squad and industrial music approaches" make it an appealing album, Franti's thematic breadth and "rich voice" are highlights.

== Track listing ==
All tracks are written by Michael Franti, except where noted.

No.	Title	Writer(s)	Length
1.	"Satanic Reverses"		4:45
2.	"Famous and Dandy (Like Amos and Andy)"		6:34
3.	"Television, the Drug of the Nation"		6:38
4.	"Language of Violence"		6:15
5.	"The Winter of the Long Hot Summer"		7:59
6.	"Hypocrisy Is the Greatest Luxury"		3:47
7.	"Everyday Life Has Become a Health Risk"		4:54
8.	"INS Greencard A-19 191 500"		1:36
9.	"Socio-Genetic Experiment"		4:19
10.	"Music and Politics"		4:01
11.	"Financial Leprosy"		5:30
12.	"California über alles"	Jello Biafra & John Greenway	4:13
13.	"Water Pistol Man"		5:55

== Charts ==
Chart (1992/93)	Peak position
Australian (ARIA Charts)	59

== Samples ==
- "Satanic Reverses"
  - Miles Davis - "Miles Runs the Voodoo Down"
- "Famous and Dandy"
  - Herbie Hancock - "Watermelon Man"
- "Television, the Drug of the Nation"
  - The Meters - "Look-Ka-Py-Py"
- "Language of Violence"
  - This Mortal Coil - "Barramundi"
- "The Winter of the Long Hot Summer"
  - This Mortal Coil - "Waves Become Wings"
  - Wally Badarou - "Ayers Rock Bubble Eyes"
- "Everyday Life Has Become a Health Risk"
  - Public Enemy - "Terminator X to the Edge of Panic"
- "California über alles"
  - "California über alles" by Dead Kennedys
- "Water Pistol Man"
  - Wally Badarou - "Leaving This Place"

== Personnel ==
- John Baker - Engineer
- Kim Buie - Art Direction
- The Disposable Heroes of Hiphoprisy - Editing, Art Direction, Mixing
- Michael Franti - Arranger, Programming, Vocals, Backing Vocals
- Vivian Hall
- Mark Heimback-Nielsen - Art Direction, Design
- Charlie Hunter - Bass, Guitar, Vocals, Voices
- Jeff Mann - Post Production Engineer
- Mark Pistel - Arranger, Programming, Engineer, Mixing
- Pete Scaturro - Engineer
- Rono Tse - Percussion, Drums, Drums (Steel), Noise, Sheet Metal
- Barbara Walker - Assistant Photographer
- Howie Weinberg - Mastering
- Simone White - Drums
- Mat Callahan - Engineer
- Jack Dangers - Mixing
- Victor Hall - Art Direction, Photography
- Jay Blakesberg - Photography
- Sean Mathis - Assistant Photographer
