= The Sound of Sunshine (Michael Franti & Spearhead album) =

Studio album by Michael Franti & Spearhead
- Released: September 21, 2010
- Recorded: December 2009 – May 2010
- Length: 43:49
- Labels: Capitol; Boo Boo Wax
- Producers: Sly & Robbie; Michael Frantí

Michael Franti & Spearhead chronology
All Rebel Rockers (2008)	The Sound of Sunshine (2010)	All People (2013)

Singles from The Sound of Sunshine
- 1. "Shake It" Released: May 25, 2010; 2. "The Sound of Sunshine" Released: June 8, 2010; 3. "Hey Hey Hey" Released: April 8, 2011

The Sound of Sunshine is the seventh studio album by Michael Franti & Spearhead, released by Capitol Records on September 21, 2010.

== Background ==
The inspiration for the title came from when Franti was on tour in 2009 and ruptured his appendix. In March 2011, he told UK soul writer and assistant editor of Blues & Soul Pete Lewis: "Because the doctors weren't sure what was wrong with me, seven days actually passed before they were able to diagnose it was my appendix - by which time I'd just completely fallen over and was DYING! So, after they eventually did the surgery on me, while I did feel a huge amount of gratitude to be alive, at the same time every moment of the day I was CRYING! Like someone would walk in the room who I hadn't seen for a while, and I'd just look at them and CRY! And when they'd go 'What are you crying about?', I'd be like 'I don't KNOW! I'm just really glad to be here, to be alive and to SEE you!'... It was like I was seeing everything with new EYES. Every day I'd go to the window to see if the sun was shining - and if it WAS, I'd have this feeling of OPTIMISM! Like 'WOW! I'm gonna beat this infection and I'm gonna get BETTER!'... And so for this album I wanted to put that feeling into words and into MUSIC."

== Critical reception ==
Professional ratings
Review scores
Source	Rating
AllMusic	3.5/5 stars
Entertainment Weekly	B+
Rolling Stone	3/5 stars

The Sound of Sunshine received mixed to positive reviews from most music critics. At Metacritic, which assigns a normalized rating out of 100 to reviews from mainstream critics, the album received an average score of 61, based on 7 reviews, which indicates "generally favorable reviews". AllMusic said, "The Sound of Sunshine is the “seize the day” result to a reggae-pop, jam band beat, filled with bliss and gratitude plus a bit of swagger and some pointed political moments that remind you this isn't Jack Johnson or John Mayer."

Rhapsody gave the album a favorable review adding, "Michael Franti is an intriguing artist. His mix of hip-hop beats, reggae and soulful folk-rock has influenced a seemingly endless parade of radio-ready singer-songwriters. And yet Franti himself has always remained on the mainstream's periphery. That's by design -- as The Sound of Sunshine clearly proves." Metromix gave it a mixed review, "The title track, which kicks off the record and then is revisited in a reworked version at the end, is the perfect bookend for this 11-track set that should only expand Franti's growing fan base. [...] While not all of the songs live up to the best three or four, the strength of those tunes makes it easier to forgive the weaker ones." Jon Dolan of Entertainment Weekly said that it "sets evocations of hard-won happiness to similarly strummy, globally grooved hip-hop."

== Track listing ==
No.	Title	Composer(s)	Length
1.	"The Sound of Sunshine"	J Bowman, Michael Franti, Carl Young	3:45
2.	"Shake It" (featuring Lady Saw)	Bowman, Franti, Marion Hall	3:28
3.	"Hey Hey Hey"	Franti	3:47
4.	"Anytime You Need Me"	Bowman, Franti, Young	3:44
5.	"I'll Be Waiting"	Bowman, Franti	4:39
6.	"Only Thing Missing Was You"	Bowman, Franti	3:26
7.	"Love Don't Wait"	Bowman, Franti	3:40
8.	"The Thing That Helps Me Get Through"	Bowman, Franti, Young	4:35
9.	"Gloria" (featuring Cherine Anderson)	Cherine Anderson, Franti, Courtney Morrison	4:12
10.	"Headphones"	Bowman, Franti	4:18
11.	"The Sound of Sunshine Going Down"	Bowman, Franti, Young	4:20

== Singles ==
- "Shake It" is the first single from the album. It was released to radio on May 20, 2010.
- "The Sound of Sunshine" is the second single released from the album. It was released on June 1, 2010.

== Charts ==
Chart (2010)	Peak position
Australian Albums (ARIA)	34
Italian Albums (FIMI)	58
US Billboard 200	17
US Digital Albums (Billboard)	9
US Top Rock Albums (Billboard)	5
US Indie Store Album Sales (Billboard)	5
