= Bossman (rapper) =

American rapper

- Born: Travis Holifield; November 23, 1981 (age 44)
- Origin: Baltimore, Maryland, U.S.
- Genres: Hip Hop
- Years active: 2002–present
- Label: Get Money Music Group /1Up Entertainment/ Myspace Records/ Interscope
- Website: Bossman Music Official Website

Bossman, aka Travis Holifield or Jimmy Hash, is a rapper from Baltimore, Maryland.

He has appeared on mixtapes promoted by DJ Kayslay who is well known through Baltimore Club music. Bossman began his rapping career as a part of N.E.K (Northeast Kings) where he was known as "Jimmy Hash". The rap group gained a moderate level of popularity throughout Baltimore. Bossman has released his debut album Law and Order in 2004 in Baltimore only as well as Mixtapes hosted by DJ Envy and Big Mike.

== Early life ==
Bossman was born Travis Holifield and grew up in Northeast Baltimore, Maryland. When he was 11, Holifield's parents were sent to prison for their involvement in a robbery, and he and his younger sister lived under the care of their grandmother for the next two years until their mother was released. During his time as a student at Hamilton Middle School, he had his first experiences performing when he and a childhood friend performed a Kris Kross song at local talent shows. Shortly thereafter, Holifield and friends created the underground hip hop group N.E.K., or Northeast Kings.

== Jena 6 ==
Bossman is a supporter of the Jena 6 and made a song called Far Too Long dedicated to the Jena 6. He released it on his Myspace page. The song first appeared on DJ D-Mob's Put B-More On The Map Volume 7 mixtape which came out October 27, 2007 on Datpiff. It later appeared on the N.E.K mixtape N.E.K All Day Part 1.

== Album History ==
=== Law & Order ===
Bossman's Debut album was called Law & Order. The album was released on December 21, 2004 on Double Down Entertainment and was produced by 1Up productions (which is now known as 1Up Entertainment).

Its original single was "Oh!" (also known by his fans as The Baltimore Anthem) and was produced by Baltimore Club producer Rod Lee. Its second single became Off da Record after it got massive radio play on 92Q and was produced by 1Up Productions, Off Da Record was the song that got Jermaine Dupri to sign Bossman to Virgin Records and his label So So Def.

=== The Re-Up ===
The Re-Up is marked as Bossman's second LP release since 2004 and is due for a June 8, 2010 release via Myspace Records/Interscope. The original title of the album was Home Of The Wire but was changed to The Re-Up in October 2009. The first single was supposed to be "Colors" but was switched to "Ghetto" featuring former Dru Hill member scola. The Second single was Break Me Off. The album was officially released June 15, 2010.

== From Virgin to Sony Urban Music to Myspace Records/Interscope ==
In early August 2007, Bossman left Virgin Records right after their deal with Capitol Records, Bossman signed a $2.5 million-plus deal with Sony Records under the Sony Urban Music label, later after he signed, Bossman announced that his long-awaited major debut album version of this 2004 Baltimore Underground album "Law & Order" will be officially released in mid December 2007. While he's got his fans getting ready for his album, he released a Pre-album CD entitled End Of Discussion which is only found in Baltimore stores only. Five Days after End Of Discussion released, it then went on Datpiff as a free download. End Of Discussion also came with another mixtape called The Overdose which was by N.E.K member Dollars. Recently, Bossman featured on the song "Rain" With Myspace Records artist Jeremy Greene. The Single released on the iTunes store July 22, 2008 and its Bossman's first major guest appearance since "A-Yo!" was released. Also on Bossman's track featuring Raheem Devaughn entitled " I Wonder" he states that he closed his deal with Myspace Records becoming an official artist of the label. Myspace Records is distributed by powerhouse music label Interscope. A music video for the song was then recorded by Sleeping Giant Media and directed by Gearie "The Grench" Bowman. It was released on August 26, 2008 on Sleeping Giant's YouTube page making it Bossman's first music video. On April 14, 2009, MySpace Records officially released "Break Me Off" on Amazon MP3 and the iTunes store as his first single for his upcoming album "Home Of The Wire. Bossman has also released two new mixtapes. The first mixtape was called ATM: After These Messages and the second mixtape was called Street Kings. In November 2009, Bossman released and EP with MySpace Records entitled B.O.S.S Vol. 1: Based On Struggle and Success.

== Discography ==
=== Albums ===
- Law & Order (2004) (Album released only in Maryland)
- The Re-Up (June 15, 2010)
- Law & Order II (2017)
- The Gift (2019)
- Power (2019)
- Target Practice (2020)

=== EPs ===
B.O.S.S Vol. 1: Based On Struggle and Success (2009)

=== Mixtapes ===
- This Is A Warning ( hosted by DJ Envy) (2005)
- Yellow Tape (hosted by DJ Envy & Big Mike) (2005)
- Bulletproof B (2006)
- No Law No Order - The Pre Album (hosted by DJ Lil Skrilla) (2007)
- End Of Discussion (2007)
- N.E.K All Day Part 1 (Group mixtape) (2008)
- Obama Or Else (2008)
- ATM: After These Messages (2009)
- Street Kings (2009)
- BlockWork (2010) Hosted By DJ Jabril
- M.O.P (Money Over Pussy) (2010)
- SwaggKillers (2011)
- Dream B.I.G (Tribute to Biggy Smalls) (2011)
- Watch the Throne (2012)

=== Singles ===
Song Title	Release date
"Oh" (B-More Anthem) (Local Release)	July 19, 2004
Off The Record (Local Release)	December 4, 2004
Hand Clap (Mainstream release)	November 29, 2005 (On iTunes)
You're Wrong (Mainstream release)	July 25, 2006 (On iTunes)
A-Yo! (Mainstream release)	December 6, 2006
So Fresh (Local Release)	May 2, 2007
Colors (Local Release)	November 14, 2007
Ghetto (Local Release)	March 25, 2008
Rain (Jeremy Greene Featuring Bossman) (Mainstream Release)	July 22, 2008
I Wonder (DJ K-Swift & Mr. Wilson Dedication) (Featuring Raheem Devaughn) (Local Release)	August 19, 2008
Is It Me (Stacie Orrico Featuring Bossman) (Mainstream Release)	August, 2008
Break Me Off (Mainstream Release)	November 5, 2008

=== Music video ===
Song Title	Release date
"I Wonder" (Bossman feat. Ryheem Davaughn ) (K-Swift Tribute) (Directed by Gearie "THE GRENCH"Bowman)	August 26, 2008

== Mixtapes & Albums He Has Appeared On ==
- The Wire Soundtrack (His song "A-Yo!" appeared on both versions of the soundtrack)
- Baltimore Real Talk DVDs #1 & #4 (Bmore's #1 and only national DVD series)
