= The Beatnigs (album) =

Studio album by the Beatnigs
- Released: 1988
- Recorded: 1988
- Studios: Dancin' Dog, Emeryville, California
- Genres: Industrial hip hop, political hip hop, experimental rock, spoken word
- Label: Alternative Tentacles
- Producer: The Beatnigs

The Beatnigs is the only album by the San Francisco band the Beatnigs, released in 1988. It combined punk, industrial and hip hop influences.

== Production ==
Michael Franti wrote all of the lyrics to the songs; he also played bass. The album was produced by the Beatnigs. An enclosure explaining the origins of the band's name was included with the album.

== Television EP ==
Television EP
- Front cover

Studio album by the Beatnigs
- Released: 1988
- Recorded: Dancing Dog
- Genres: Industrial, big beat
- Label: Alternative Tentacles
- Producer: ON-U Sound

The Beatnigs chronology
The Beatnigs (1988)	Television EP (1988)

Professional ratings
Review scores
Source	Rating
AllMusic	2/5 stars

The Television EP is the Beatnigs' 4-song follow-up, also released in 1988. The opening track is remixed by English dub musicians Adrian Sherwood, Gary Clail, and Mark Stewart. There's a special thanks to "Troy" on the rear cover, indicating that Louis "Troy" Dixon (AKA the Crack Emcee) had joined the band.

== Critical reception ==
Professional ratings
Review scores
Source	Rating
AllMusic	2/5 stars
Spin Alternative Record Guide	7/10

Spin wrote that the album mixed "the Last Poets’ severe rhetoric with the horrific industrial grinding of Einstürzende Neubauten." Trouser Press said that "this striking San Francisco quintet explodes in a tight and danceable riot of industrial percussion, vocals and tape manipulations." The New York Times called the album "a powerful conglomeration of taped sounds—speeches by Malcolm X, for instance—industrial noise made with saws, sirens and oil drums, and a conventional rhythm section."

MusicHound Rock: The Essential Album Guide called it "the most interesting and innovative album any of Franti's three groups has made, loaded with sonic twists and turns." The Spin Alternative Record Guide deemed it "an angrier warm-up to De La Soul a year later: choppy beats mingled with inflammatory news items, goofy how-to spiels, exhortations from Malcolm X and others, and twisted loops of electro-industrial din."

== Track listing ==
All songs written by the Beatnigs.

1. "(Welcome) - Television"
2. " C.I.A."
3. "(Instructions) - When You Wake Up in the Morning"
4. "(The Experience of All of Us) - Street Fulla Nigs"
5. " (Re-Classification) - Control"
6. "Malcolm X"
7. "Nature"
8. "Burritos"
9. "Rooticus Sporaticus"
10. "Who Is Doing This to All My People"
11. "Rules"

Television EP

1. "Television" (ON-U Sound Dance Mix) – 6:40
2. "Television" (Dub Mix) – 6:40
3. "Television" (Beatnigs Radio Edit) – 4:22
4. "Jazzy Beats" – 1:46

=== CD bonus tracks ===
- "Jazzy Beats"
- "Pre-War America"
- "Television" (Radio Edit)
- "Television" (Remix)

== Personnel ==
The Beatnigs

- Henry Flood – congas, timbales, industrial percussion
- Andre Flores – keyboards, sampling, vocals, industrial percussion
- Michael Franti – vocals, bass, tape edits, industrial percussion
- Kevin Carnes – vocals, tape edits, industrial percussion
- Rono Tse – industrial percussion, circular saw, siren electric buzzer, tire rim, chains, whistle, oil drum, shakers, tambourines

Also

- Robert Collins – piano

Engineer

- David "Davy D" Bryson

Remix

- "Television" (Remix) remixed by Adrian Sherwood, Gary Clail and Mark Stewart
