= All People =

Studio album by Michael Franti & Spearhead
- Released: 2013
- Genre: Pop rap
- Length: 40:32
- Label: Boo Boo Wax; Capitol

Michael Franti & Spearhead chronology
The Sound of Sunshine (2010)	All People (2013)	Soulrocker (2016)

All People is an album by the American band Michael Franti & Spearhead, released in 2013 through Boo Boo Wax and Capitol Records. The first single was "I'm Alive (Life Sounds Like)". Franti supported the album with North American and Australian tours. In 2014, he continued to promote All People by headlining the Soulshine Music and Yoga Tour.

== Production ==
The majority of the album was recorded in Hunters Point, with some of the mixing occurring while the band was on tour. The album continued Franti's turn toward pop music; he had concluded that a pop song could be as comforting and meaningful as a protest song. For the first time in his career, Franti worked with outside songwriters and producers, including Sam Hollander, the Matrix, and Adrian Newman. Franti recorded around 35 songs and listened to the rough mixes while doing his morning yoga, to ensure that they were properly "inspiring". He also wanted the tracks to incorporate dance influences, with some geared toward club play. "Say Goodbye" is about the murder of Trayvon Martin. A version of "11:59" was written around 2003; Franti finished the chorus for it after surviving a ruptured appendix. K'naan guested on "Earth from Outer Space".

== Critical reception ==
Professional ratings
Review scores
Source	Rating
AllMusic	3.5/5 stars
The Buffalo News	2/4 stars
PopMatters	7/10
Postmedia Network	3.5/4 stars
RapReviews	7.5/10
Rolling Stone	3.5/5 stars

Postmedia Network called the album "an infectiously sunny synthesis of pop, reggae, hip-hop and indie-folk." Rolling Stone noted that "Franti's peace 'n' love MO has veered toward full-on jam pop for several years now, so mainstream-y anthems like the Euro-disco title track are really no big leap." Bass Player labeled All People Franti's "most heavily produced, studio programmed album yet". The Buffalo News deemed it "sun-soaked pop music with feel-good, bumper sticker-style wisdom presented as insightful commentary." The Kansas City Star said that Franti "evokes an array of resemblances, some vague, some strong: to Bob Marley, G-Love, Everlast, UB40." Tucson Weekly opined that while "the message of universal equality [of the title track] is spot-on and encouraging, Franti's rap-bridge lyrics about rocking everywhere can be terrible."

== Track listing ==
All People track listing
No.	Title	Length
1.	"All People"	4:08
2.	"11:59"	3:45
3.	"I'm Alive (Life Sounds Like)"	3:53
4.	"Long Ride Home"	3:51
5.	"Life Is Better with You"	3:18
6.	"Earth from Outer Space"	3:52
7.	"Closer to You"	3:39
8.	"Show Me a Sign"	3:38
9.	"On and On"	3:43
10.	"Wherever You Are"	3:14
11.	"Say Goodbye"	3:31
Total length:		40:32
