= All Rebel Rockers =

Studio album by Michael Franti & Spearhead
- Released: September 9, 2008
- Label: Anti-; Boo Boo Wax
- Producer: Sly and Robbie

Michael Franti & Spearhead chronology
Yell Fire! (2006)	All Rebel Rockers (2008)	The Sound of Sunshine (2010)

Professional ratings
Review scores
Source	Rating
AllMusic	4/5 stars
The Skinny	4/5 stars
World of Music	3/5 stars

All Rebel Rockers is the sixth studio album by Michael Franti & Spearhead released on September 9, 2008, on Boo Boo Wax and ANTI- Records. It peaked at number 37 on the U.S. Billboard 200, making it their most successful album.

Recorded mostly in Kingston, Jamaica, with noted producers Sly and Robbie, the album is described by Franti as having "a solid reggae feel". Guest musicians include Marie Daulne of Zap Mama and Jamaican soul/dancehall singer Cherine Anderson. All Rebel Rockers spawned the million-selling reggae/dancehall-flavoured single "Say Hey (I Love You)", which peaked at 18 on the Billboard US Hot 100.

== Track listing ==
1. "Rude Boys Back in Town"
2. "A Little Bit of Riddim"
  - Featuring Cherine Anderson
3. "Life in the City"
4. "Hey World (Remote Control Version)"
5. "All I Want Is You"
6. "Say Hey (I Love You)"
  - Featuring Cherine Anderson
7. "I Got Love for You"
8. "Soundsystem"
  - Featuring Cherine Anderson
9. "Hey World (Don't Give Up Version)"
10. "The Future"
11. "High Low"
  - Featuring Zap Mama
12. "Nobody Right Nobody Wrong"
13. "Have a Little Faith"
14. "High Low [Acoustic Mix]" (Bonus Track)
15. "Rude Boys Back in Town [News Flash Mix]" (Bonus Track)
16. "Into the Sun [Dub Version]" (Bonus Track, only on vinyl and iTunes)

== Personnel ==
- Cherine Anderson – vocals
- Marie Daulne – vocals
- Sly Dunbar – production
- Michael Franti – vocals
- Manas Itene – drums
- Raleigh Neal II – keyboards
- Robbie Shakespeare – production
- Dave Shul – guitars
- Carl Young – bass

== Charts ==
Chart (2008)	Peak position
Australian Albums (ARIA)	18
Belgian Albums (Ultratop Flanders)	40
Dutch Albums (Album Top 100)	25
US Billboard 200	39
US Independent Albums (Billboard)	4
US Top Rock Albums (Billboard)	13
US Indie Store Album Sales (Billboard)	6
