= Soulrocker =

Studio album by Michael Franti & Spearhead
- Released: June 3, 2016
- Length: 52:19
- Label: Fantasy
- Producer: Michael Franti; Dwayne Chin-Quee

Michael Franti & Spearhead chronology
All People (2013)	Soulrocker (2016)

Soulrocker is the ninth studio album by Michael Franti & Spearhead, released on June 3, 2016, by Fantasy Records. He collaborated with the Jamaican producers Stephen McGregor and Dwayne "Supa Dups" Chin-Quee. A tour in support of the album was announced in February.

== Critical reception ==
Professional ratings
Review scores
Source	Rating
AllMusic	3.5/5 stars
Exclaim!	7/10

Writing for Exclaim!, Ryan B. Patrick praised the album's "overpowering sincerity and musicianship".

== Track listing ==
All tracks composed by Michael Franti

1. "Crazy for You" (3:39)
2. "My Lord" (3:55)
3. "Get Myself to Saturday" (4:18)
4. "Summertime Is in Our Hands" (3:48)
5. "We Are All Earthlings" (3:44)
6. "Still Standing" (3:46)
7. "Good to Be Alive Today" (4:14)
8. "My Favorite Wine Is Tequila" (4:08)
9. "Once a Day" (3:57)
10. "We Do This Every Day" (4:14)
11. "I Got Love for Ya" (3:58)
12. "Do You Feel the Way That I Do?" (4:56)
13. "Love Will Find a Way" (3:42)

== Personnel ==
- Atanas Babaleski – engineer
- Mike Blankenship – piano (7)
- Chelsea Boisen – production assistant
- Jay Bowman – guitar (4–6, 11), background vocals (6), assistant engineer, engineer, mixing
- Yasmine Brown – background vocals (1, 3–5, 7–8, 11, 13)
- Mitchum Khan Chin – electric guitar (1, 8–10, 12)
- Dwayne Chin-Quee – additional production, drum programming (1–3, 5–6, 8, 10–11, 13), engineer, keyboards (2, 5), mixing, producer, vocals (j9), background vocals (6)
- Matthew Desrameux – engineer
- F.A.M.E.'S Macedonian Symphonic Orchestra conducted by Oleg Kondratenko (7)
- Michael Franti – bass (7), acoustic guitar (1, 4–13), mixing, producer, vocals (all tracks)
- Dean Fraser – saxophone (1)
- Chris Gehringer – mastering
- Keith Hollar - background vocals (5)
- Giorgi Hristovski – concert sound engineer
- Peter Jensen – engineer
- J-Vibes - keyboards (5, 8)
- Masaki Koike – art direction, design
- Stephen McGregor – bass (1, 10, 12), drum programming (3, 10, 12), engineer, keyboards (1, 3, 6, 10, 12–13), producer, background vocals (6, 13)
- Niko Marzouca – engineer, mixing
- Randy Miller – orchestral arrangements (7)
- Samson Rawls – assistant engineer, engineer, background vocals (4, 6)
- Sonna Rele – vocals (9)
- Nambo Robinson – trombone (1)
- Rafael Rodriguez – trumpet (9)
- Polly Snowden – cover photo
- Rhiannon Snyder – production assistant
- Everol Wray - trumpet (1)
- Bulby York – horn engineer
- Carl Young - additional keyboards (2)

== Charts ==
Chart (2016)	Peak position
Australian Albums (ARIA)	65
Belgian Albums (Ultratop Flanders)	175
Canadian Albums (Billboard)	96
US Billboard 200	38
US Top Rock Albums (Billboard)	5
