= Michael Franti =

American musician (born 1966)

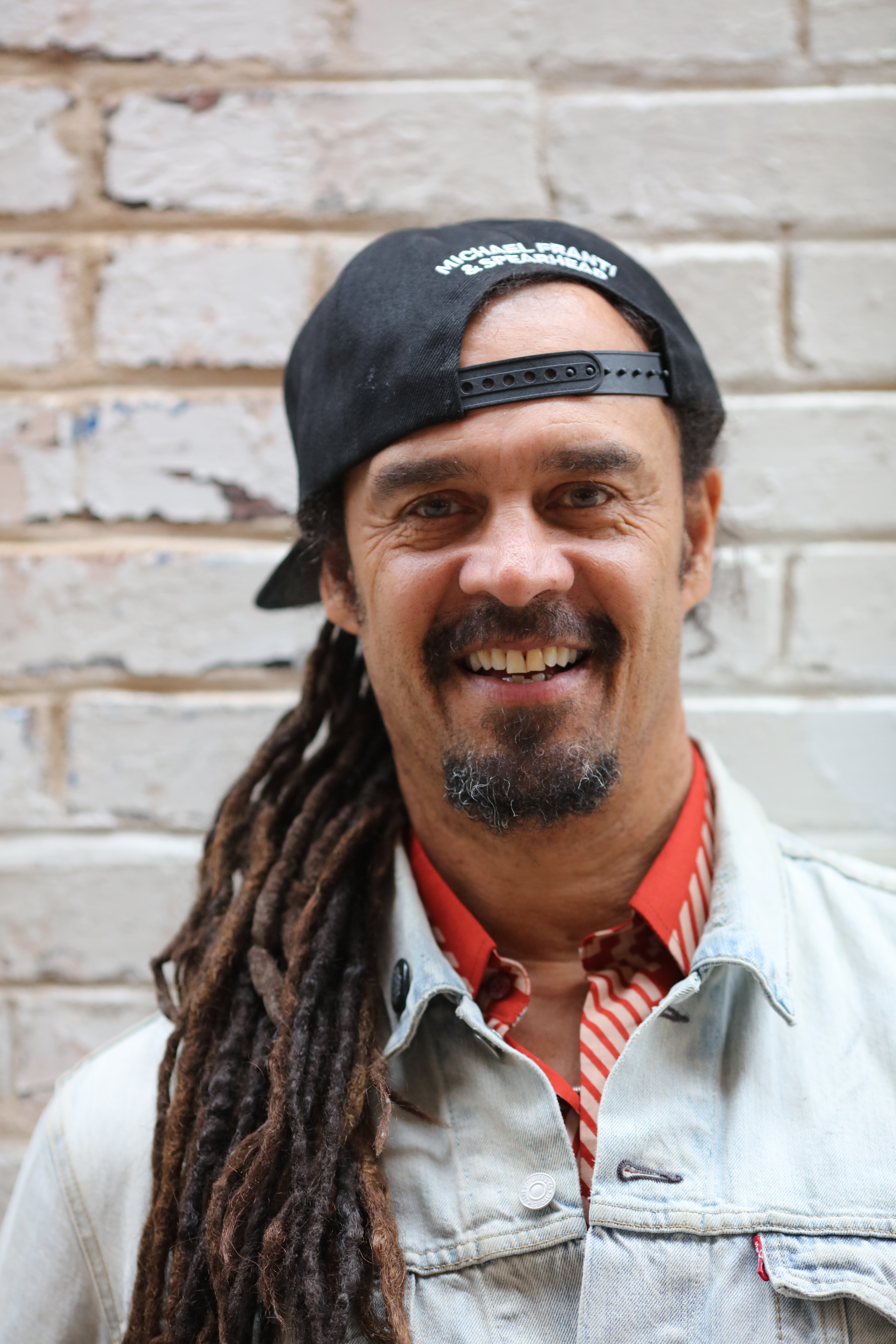
- Franti in 2025

Background information
- Born: April 21, 1966 (age 60); Oakland, California, U.S.
- Origin: San Francisco, California, U.S.
- Genres: Alternative rock; alternative hip-hop; neo soul; pop; rock; reggae fusion; protest song; folk rock; folk; reggae; hip-hop; avant-garde
- Occupations: Composer; musician; entertainer; poet; rapper
- Instruments: Vocals; guitar
- Years active: 1986–present
- Labels: Alternative Tentacles; Island; Capitol; Boo Boo Wax; Six Degrees; ANTI-
- Member of: Michael Franti and Spearhead
- Formerly of: The Beatnigs; The Disposable Heroes of Hiphoprisy
- Website: michaelfranti.com

Michael Franti (born April 21, 1966) is an American singer, songwriter, musician, poet, activist, documentarian, and rapper — widely known for his numerous musical projects with political and social emphasis, including the Beatnigs and the Disposable Heroes of Hiphoprisy. Franti founded and is lead vocalist of Michael Franti & Spearhead, a band blending hip-hop with a variety of other styles including funk, reggae, jazz, folk, and rock. He is outspoken on peace and social justice and Middle East issues.

== Early life ==
Franti was born in Oakland, California. His mother, Mary Lofy, had Irish, German, and Belgian ancestry; his father, Thomas Hopkins, was of African American and Native American descent. He was adopted by Carole Wisti and Charles Franti, a Finnish American couple in Oakland, who at the time had three biological children and one adopted African American son. Charles Franti was a professor in the department of epidemiology and preventive medicine of the UC Davis School of Veterinary Medicine and died in 2003. Franti's four adoptive siblings are Rebecca, Sara, Dan, and Matthew. Michael also has four half-siblings, Thea, Thomas, Charles, and Arthur Hopkins.

Franti attended Highland Junior High School in Edmonton, Alberta through grade 9, later attending Davis Senior High School and the University of San Francisco — the latter, on a full basketball scholarship, averaging 2.4 pts per game during the 1985–1986 season. At USF, Franti met a priest who taught him how to write stories, and soon he was writing poetry. He purchased a bass guitar at a pawn shop and started creating music inspired by hip-hop, punk, and reggae which was being played on the campus radio station, KUSF.

== Career ==
=== The Beatnigs (1986–1990) ===
Franti began his music career in 1986 as part of the industrial punk/spoken word band the Beatnigs. While attending the University of San Francisco and living above KUSF he developed a fascination with music and decided to start a band. The Beatnigs included dancer and percussionist Rono Tse; the band released a self-titled LP and an EP Television on Alternative Tentacles records. The records received some critical acclaim but little fame beyond the San Francisco Bay Area.

The group recorded at Dancin' Dog Studio in Emeryville and was distributed by Alternative Tentacles. In addition to Michael Franti (bass, vocals) and Ron Tse (percussion, vocals) the band included Henry Flood (percussion, vocals) Andre Flores (keyboards, vocals) Kevin Carnes (drums, vocals) and Louis 'Troy' Dixon (percussion, vocals). All members made multiple instrumental contributions.

=== Disposable Heroes of Hiphoprisy (1991–93) ===
His next project, the Disposable Heroes of Hiphoprisy, found Franti continuing his collaboration with Tse, and working with jazz guitarist Charlie Hunter, as well as electronic musicians Mark Pistel (Consolidated) and Jack Dangers (Meat Beat Manifesto). The Disposable Heroes wrote politically charged lyrics that railed against the injustices of the world, set to a fusion of industrial music and hip-hop. Their first album, Hypocrisy is the Greatest Luxury (on Island Records), won plaudits for its social commentary, and they were chosen by U2 to open for their Zoo TV Tour.

The album's lyrics dealt with a range of issues, including the US involvement in the Gulf war, the oil industry, homophobic violence, immigration, Franti's own cultural background and adoption, and more personal politics. The single "Television, The Drug of The Nation" (previously recorded by Franti's former project, The Beatnigs) gained airplay on college and alternative radio stations for its critique of mainstream television, which as the title implies, blames the media for a political numbing of ordinary people, explicit in the lyrics: "T.V., it satellite links, our United States of unconsciousness, apathetic therapeutic and extremely addictive".

The Disposable Heroes recorded music accompanying novelist William Burroughs' readings for an album entitled Spare Ass Annie and Other Tales. The distinctive work of the Disposable Heroes of Hiphoprisy has been analyzed in various academic papers, including by author Leslie Haywood and editor Jeniffer Drake in the book Third Wave Agenda, Being Feminist and Doing Feminism. The analysis involved the role of masculinity in the misogynist point of view which dominates popular music e.g. in rap music. The authors assert that Franti's lyrics in treating women fairly in relationships is an exception.

According to the Encyclopedia of Popular Music, Disposable Heroes of Hiphoprisy is an innovative contemporary hip-hop crew; a mixture of articulate manifesto rap which broke down beyond the black and white rhetoric, especially in the song "Language of Violence", one of the first raps to speak about homophobia.

=== Michael Franti and Spearhead (1994–present) ===
Michael Franti & Spearhead
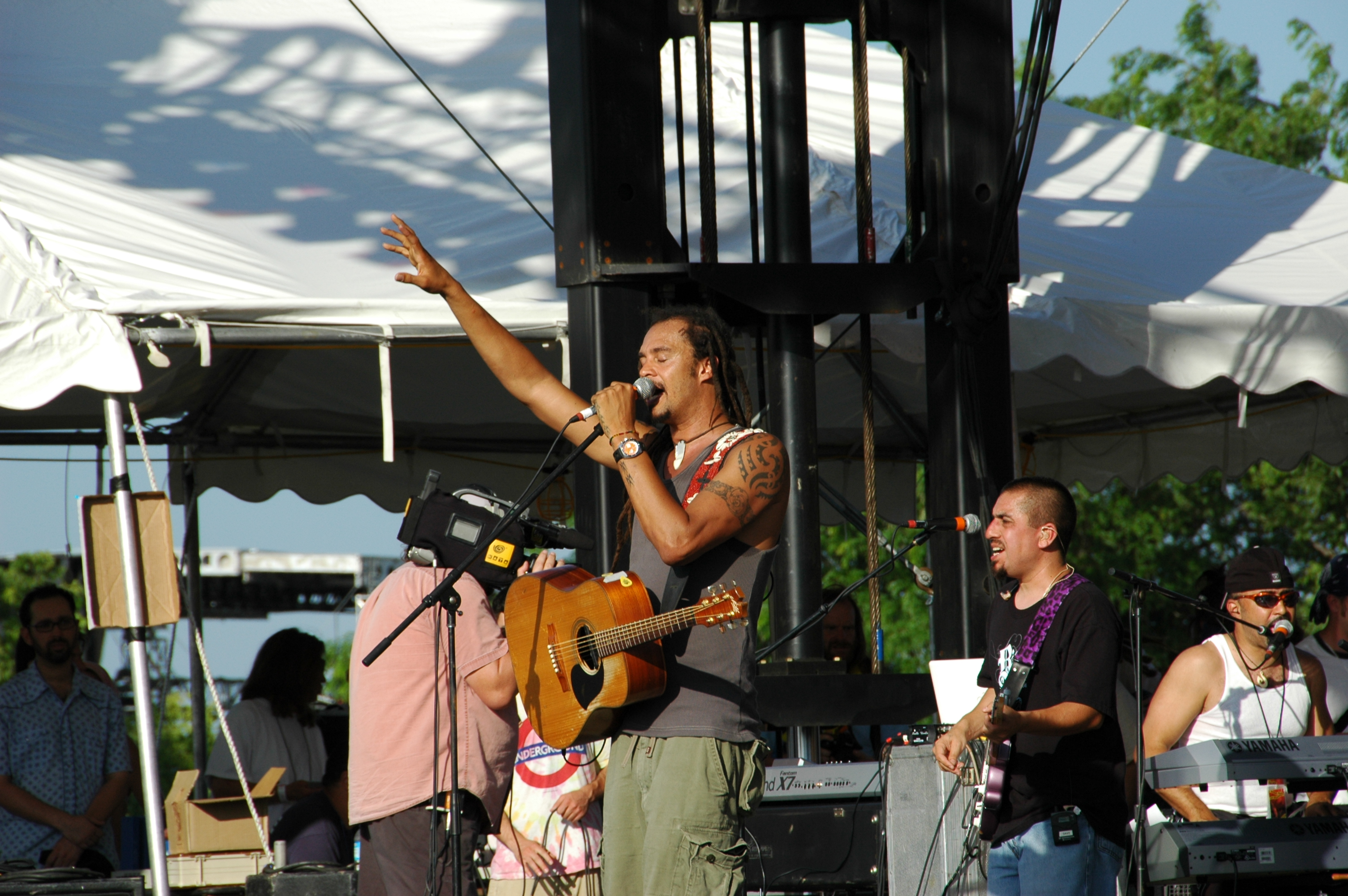
- Michael Franti and Spearhead performing in 2006

Background information
- Origin: San Francisco
- Genres: Roots; rock; reggae; hip hop; soul; funk; pop
- Years active: 1994–present
- Members: Michael Franti (vocals); Carl Young (bass); Raga Wiguna (guitar); Mike Blankenship (keyboard); Manas Itiene (drums)
- Past members: MC RadioActive J. Bowman
- Website: michaelfranti.com

In 1994, Franti dissolved the Disposable Heroes of Hiphoprisy and formed a new band called Spearhead with a few studio musicians, including mainstay Carl Young. Their first release, Home, in September 1994, was a departure from the politically charged rap of the Disposable Heroes and drew more from funk and soul music. The album was produced by Franti and Joe Nicolo. The song "Positive", also from the album Home, appeared on the Stolen Moments: Red Hot + Cool compilation album by the Red Hot Organization. In 1998, Spearhead recorded "I Got Plenty 'o Nuthin" with Ernest Ranglin for the Red Hot Organization's compilation album Red Hot + Rhapsody.

Their follow-up album, Chocolate Supa Highway was released in March 1997, with several changes in band members between releases. This album featured a return to hip-hop elements and a pronounced reggae influence and included guest appearances by notables like Stephen Marley and Joan Osborne.

After releasing the two albums, the band split with Capitol Records (reportedly prompted by the label's repeated urging to perform with other artists like Will Smith). The band instead decided to create its own record label, Boo Boo Wax. Since Capitol Records owned the rights to the name "Spearhead", subsequent albums were all released as "Michael Franti & Spearhead." His song "Sometimes" was included on the soundtrack to the 1999 film Mystery Men, as well as the soundtrack to the 2006 film Last Holiday. Also, under the "Spearhead" name, their cover version of The Police's 1979 No. 32 hit, "Roxanne", was featured on the soundtrack to the 1997 film Good Burger.

Michael Franti & Spearhead released Stay Human in 2000 under their own label Boo Boo Wax in alignment with indie music label Six Degrees Records. The album's central theme was the unjust nature of the death penalty and other major themes included mass media monopolization, the prison-industrial complex and corporate globalization. In an interview, Franti talked about the message of Stay Human: "Half the record is songs about what's happening in the world right now, and the other half is about how we cope with it as people who are concerned about what's going on", he said. "This specter of war, intimidation, this nation vs. the rest of the world, it wears us out. Half the record is a healthy dose of venting anger about that, and the other half is about how do we hold on to our spirituality, our community and our connectedness to each other."

In 2001, Franti was featured on Lamb's album What Sound, providing backing vocals on the track "I Cry". Also in 2001, Michael Franti & Spearhead released the song "Oh My God", arguably one of Michael Franti & Spearhead's most precise resistance songs. It was analyzed in Catherine Chaput's book Entertaining Fear: Rhetoric and the Political Economy of Social Control. Chaput uses the lyrics of "Oh My God" to show how it is counter-productive to understand politics as distinct from economics and culture. The lyrics make connections across science, popular culture and politics.

Everyone Deserves Music was released in 2003. Franti composed many of the songs from his guitar and, like fellow 21st-century cultural globalists Manu Chao and Ozomatli, continues to synthesize his eclectic influences. In a departure from the industrial sounds of the Beatnigs and Disposable Heroes, and the minimalism of early Spearhead, Franti's affirming lyrics are now set to swelling rock chords, while keeping a world-wise groove nodding towards reggae, dancehall, bossa nova, Afrobeat, and funk. Anthems like the title track "Everyone Deserves Music", "Yes I Will" and "Bomb The World" are constructed with a nod to the 1980s rock of The Clash and U2, as well as to classic soul from Stax and Motown. The song "We Don't Stop" (featuring Gift of Gab from Blackalicious and Spearhead's rapper/beatbox technician Radioactive) bridges the two sounds in a "Magnificent Seven" style mash-up. And on "Love Why Did You Go Away" and "What I Be", Franti reveals an alluring, sensual singing voice. "Pray For Grace" and "Bomb The World (Armageddon Version)" pair Franti with the reggae/funk giants Sly and Robbie (Grace Jones, Rolling Stones, Black Uhuru, No Doubt).

Also in 2003, Franti released a mostly acoustic album, Songs from the Front Porch, containing rearranged versions of older songs from Chocolate Supa Highway, Stay Human, and Everyone Deserves Music as well as a couple of new tracks.

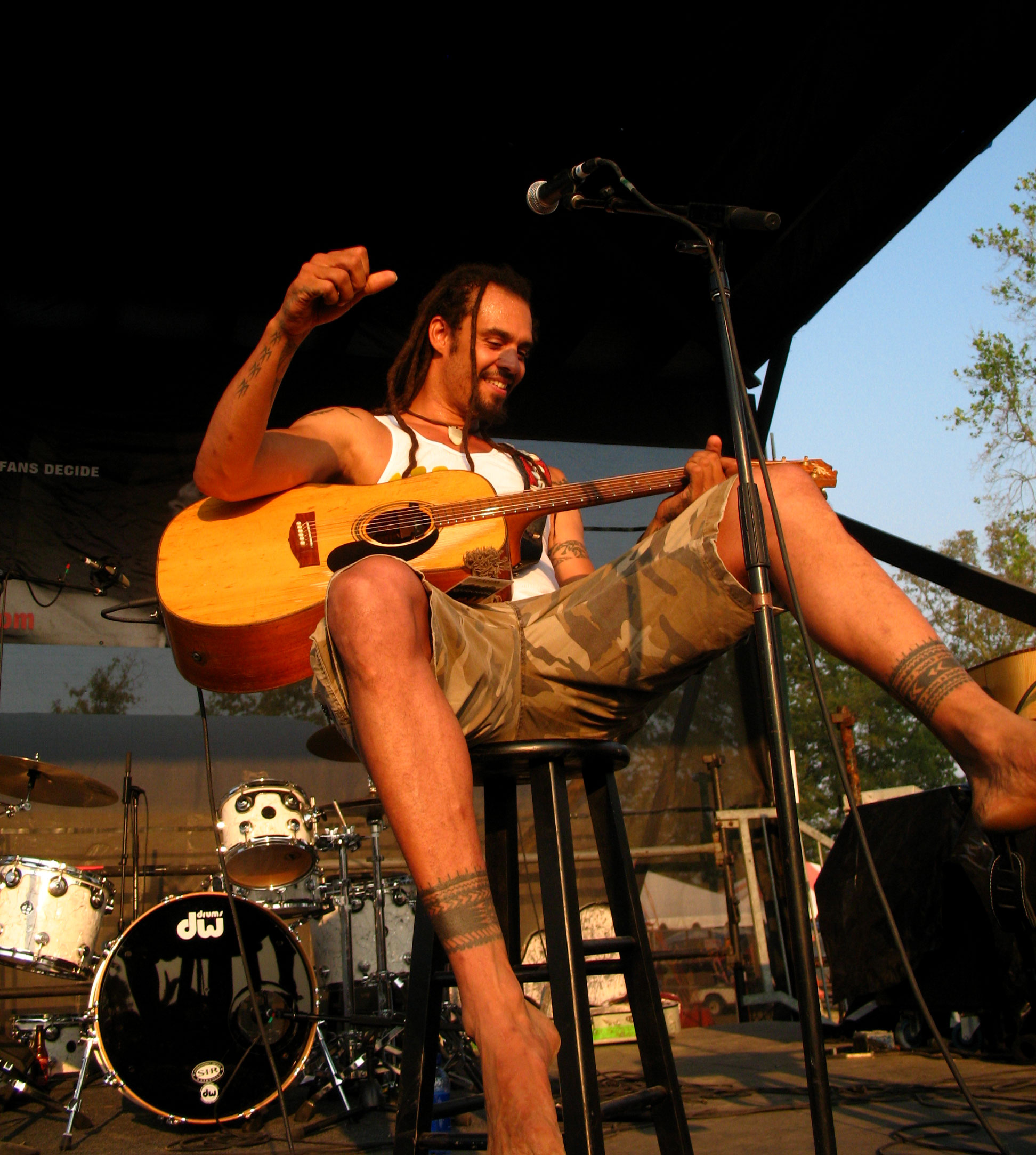
Michael Franti at the 2007 Bonnaroo Music Festival

On July 25, 2006, Michael Franti & Spearhead released Yell Fire!, inspired by Franti's trip to Israel, the West Bank, the Gaza Strip and Iraq. In an effort to share his experiences from his trip and to explore the human cost of war, Franti produced a movie entitled I Know I'm Not Alone, using the songs from his album Yell Fire! as a soundtrack. "One Step Closer To You" from Yell Fire! features Pink on backing vocals. The whole album is available for listening in his website.

Franti and Spearhead have gained a worldwide audience through touring and appearances in alternative media like Mother Jones magazine and Democracy Now!. Franti continues to tour in addition to producing the annual Power to the Peaceful festival each year since 1998. The festival originated as a way of supporting Mumia Abu-Jamal, who has been convicted of murdering a policeman but is considered by some on the Left to be a political prisoner. Michael Franti continues to gain influence in both popular music and social movements largely through extensive touring and word of mouth fan support. Lyrics from his song "Bomb The World", written in the dark aftermath of September 11 such as "You can bomb the world to pieces, but you can't bomb it into peace" have found their way onto protest signs and t-shirts all over the world from Los Angeles to Berlin, San Francisco to CNN, at demonstrations for peace large and small.

The song "Light Up Ya Lighter" by Michael Franti & Spearhead was included on the soundtrack to Body of War, an award-winning documentary about Tomas Young, a paralyzed Iraq War veteran. Songs from Yell Fire and All Rebel Rockers are on the soundtrack to The Edge of Never, a documentary about extreme skiers mentoring 15-year-old Kye Peterson in his quest to ski the route in Chamonix, France that killed his father, Trevor Peterson, nine years earlier.

The album All Rebel Rockers was released on September 9, 2008, and was largely recorded in Jamaica at the Anchor studio in St Andrew. The band worked with ubiquitous rhythm team Sly and Robbie and featured multi-talented vocalist Cherine Anderson on the set which entered the Billboard 200 pop chart in September at number 38. The single ''Say Hey (I Love You)' also reached Number 18 on the US Hot 100, providing Franti with his first US Top 20 single. Michael Franti was featured on Aux.tv's show Volume where he spoke about U.S. politics and his efforts to make the world a better place.

Franti played three different events to commemorate President Barack Obama's inauguration: The Green Ball, The Peace Ball, and the Rock the Vote Party. Franti announced in November 2009 that he would be joining musician John Mayer on the Battle Studies Tour in spring 2010. As part of the band's commitment to environmentalism, Michael Franti and Spearhead avoid the use of water bottles on national tours and run their tour bus on biodiesel.

Franti announced the release of The Sound of Sunshine on his official website in July 2010. It features 12 tracks including two versions of the title track, the new hit single, "Shake It", and staples of his recent live performances including "Hey Hey Hey", "Anytime You Need Me", "The Thing That Helps Me Get Through", and the anthemic arena-rock ballad "I'll Be Waiting". The album was originally set to be released on August 24, but was pushed back to September 21 to give the album "more runway."

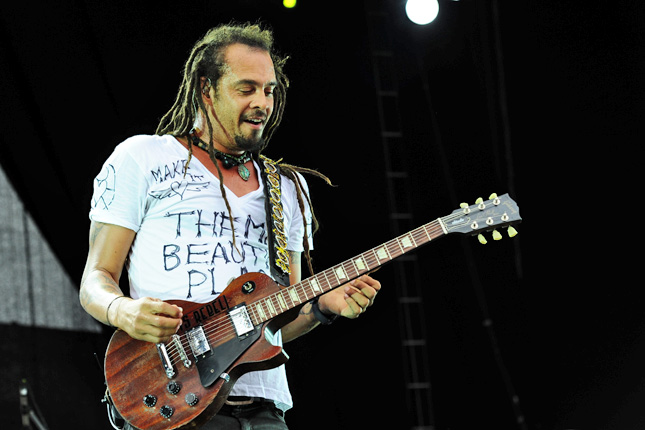
Michael Franti & Spearhead performing at the West Coast Blues & Roots Festival in Fremantle Park in 2011

Franti started the recording process for The Sound of Sunshine in Jamaica but then continued to mix tracks and record in Bali before choosing to bring a portable studio on the road. He continued to record on the road and then test his ideas in front of live audiences to see if they liked it before going back and revamping it the next day. He has since been quoted as saying 90% of the album ended up being recorded on his laptop. In 2012, he joined the 11th annual Independent Music Awards judging panel to assist independent musicians' careers.

In 2013, Franti released All People. The single, "I'm Alive (Life Sounds Like)", was released on July 30, 2013, and was featured on The Sims 4 and Rayman Legends game trailers. He released the album SoulRocker in 2016. All the songs began on the acoustic guitar. In March 2018, Franti announced a new album, Stay Human, Vol. II, would be released in June 2018 and also stands as the soundtrack to his new documentary. In July Franti, via Instagram, announced the album was delayed until Fall 2018. Stay Human, Vol. II was released on January 25, 2019, and on October 12 the first single was released, "Just to Say I Love you".

In 2020, Franti released the album "Work Hard and Be Nice." His single "Good Day for a Good Day" from his 2022 album "Follow Your Heart" was a top 25 AAA hit. He did the music for the Woody Harrelson film Champions.

== Politics ==
Franti is also an advocate for peace in the Middle East. His 2005 film I Know I'm Not Alone features footage of Iraq, the Palestinian territories, and Israel. Franti decided to embark on a three-week journey with friends to view the human cost of war in the Middle East first-hand. Franti said, "This film came out of my frustration with watching the nightly news and hearing generals, politicians, and pundits explaining the political and economic cost of the war in the Middle East, without ever mentioning the human cost. I wanted to hear about the war by the people affected by it most: doctors, nurses, poets, artists, soldiers, and my personal favorite, musicians."

The film aims to speak to multiple generations and to give a better understanding of the people who still live in war-torn countries. He did not embark on the trip for the film with any special government groups or organizations. "When I first had the idea for this journey, I had no idea how to get to Iraq and almost no idea how to make a film. After discovering that all you need to get into Iraq is a plane ticket, I prayed that movie making would be that simple..." he said. After his trip to the Middle East, Franti argued that it was poverty more than religion that created tensions in the Gaza region. "The poverty was so severe," said Franti. "This really helped me to understand the frustration the Palestinian youth have. Ultimately, my belief is that it is poverty more than religion that creates tensions and frustrations. If you are struggling to feed your family, living on less than US$2 (Dh7.34) a day, as most Gaza residents are, and can see that past the checkpoint in Israel people live like in Los Angeles, then that really is going to cause mounting tensions."

In 2001, Franti was awarded the Domestic Human Rights Award by Global Exchange, an international NGO based in San Francisco, for his work to end war. In 2006, he was invited by Australian Labour MP Jenny Macklin to show the film at Australia's Parliament House in Canberra.

Music and politics have always been a part of Franti's art, as seen early in his career with the song "Music and Politics", released during the "Disposable Heroes of Hiphoprisy" phase. The song consists of Franti reciting spoken word with a soft electric guitar riffing in the background. Although Franti's point of view about the role of music in politics and the style of music he uses to express himself have changed, he still writes about politics and continues to work as an activist towards social change. The album All Rebel Rockers from 2008 (US #39) already with Spearhead was also a vehicle to express Franti's political views through music. According to Franti, the album was inspired by contemporary issues like climate change, the price of gas going up and down, the stock market and the auto industry, and the Obama presidency.

His trip to the Middle East and his other world travel have helped shape his global political perspective. Franti works with the charitable cause Ubuntu Education Fund, has promoted vegan diets, has promoted being barefoot, and followed the Occupy Wall Street movement during one of Michael Franti and Spearhead's tours.

== Do It for the Love ==
Franti's wish-granting nonprofit organization, Do It for the Love, is a project he founded in 2013 with his wife Sara Agah Franti, with a mission to bring individuals with life-threatening illnesses and trauma, children with severe challenges, and wounded veterans to live concerts in the goal to inspire joy through the healing power of music.

His foundation has bridged connections between fans of all ages with their musical heroes, with the participation of notable artists such as Billie Eilish, JoJo Siwa, Pentatonix, and Franti himself.

== Soulshine Bali ==
Franti owns a yoga resort hotel in the southern part of Ubud, Bali, called Soulshine. It is considered "Michael Franti's oasis of yoga, soul, and rock n' roll." His resort was originally named Stay Human Yoga Retreat Center when it first opened in 2011, a joint venture between Franti and Carla Swanson.

In a 2020 interview, Franti explained what drew him to Bali, Indonesia specifically sharing, "the first time I came to Bali I fell in love with the Balinese culture. People here are so incredible. That was in 2007. Bali is an island of creative geniuses, and what I mean by that is everybody, whether you're a banker, shop owner or something like that, everyone does some form of art...they all really work together and they're all super-creative and just very kind people. I fell in love with the culture. It's a beautiful tropical Island here, so that's great." He explained the organic nature of this venture, "I thought it would be a good place to buy a little piece of land and, hopefully, build a little vacation home. So, we built five rooms with a yoga studio on top and it was like, 'If you build it, they will come.' Sure enough, we started getting teachers bringing in groups of students here. Over the years we kept putting the money back into building more rooms and we are up to 32 rooms now." Soulshine has hosted many retreats led by people such as Trevor Hall and FullyRaw Kristina, serving organically grown food from their own farms. In 2020, the yoga resort additionally expanded into a day club.

In June 2020, Franti began hosting his "Stay at Home Concert World Tour" within his own yoga resort, taking part of the "virtual concert revolution" as a response to the COVID-19 Health Pandemic.

== Personal life ==
Franti has four children. He is married to emergency room nurse and jewelry designer Sara Agah. He was previously married to Tara Franti-Rye from 1998 until 2004; she is the mother of Ade.

Inspired by one of his children, Franti became a vegan.

In 2000, Michael decided not to wear any shoes, initially for three days. Since then, he has chosen to go barefoot except for occasionally wearing flip-flops as required to board an airplane or to be served in a restaurant. He prefers bare feet. In 2014, Michael's second eldest, Ade, was diagnosed with a kidney disease called focal segmental glomerulosclerosis (FSGS). The disease has left Ade with just 50% function in his kidneys. Michael said, "My son being diagnosed was the worst news I ever got in my whole life... we didn't know if he could graduate from high school or what kind of life he was going to have. We don't know where it's going to go next, but he inspires me everyday."

In September 2018, Franti's third child, was born. It was his first child with Agah. His fourth child, and second with Agah, was born on May 15, 2025.

On August 11, 2025, musician Victoria Canal accused Franti of grooming and sexual assault eight years earlier when she was touring with him. Franti was dropped from his scheduled Soulshine cruise concerts because of the controversy. Franti responded to the accusation by saying that "the relationship was completely consensual".

== Discography ==
=== Solo ===
- 2000: Live at the Baobab
- 2002 Passion
- 2003: Songs from the Front Porch

=== Spearhead ===
==== Studio albums ====
List of albums, with selected details and chart positions
Title	Album details	Peak chart positions								Sales
Title	Album details	US	US Rock	AUS	BEL	CAN	NLD	NZ	UK	Sales
Home	Released: September 20, 1994; Label: Capitol	—	—	44	44	—	—	24	147	
Chocolate Supa Highway	Released: March 25, 1997; Label: Capitol	—	—	56	—	—	79	25	68	
Stay Human	Released: May 15, 2001; Label: Boo Boo Wax	—	—	30	—	—	—	32	—	ARIA: Gold
Everyone Deserves Music	Released: June 17, 2003; Label: Boo Boo Wax	—	—	9	28	—	34	26	—	ARIA: Gold
Yell Fire!	Released: July 25, 2006; Label: Anti-	125	—	14	19	—	20	—	—	
All Rebel Rockers	Released: September 8, 2008; Label: Anti-	39	13	18	40	—	25	—	—	
The Sound of Sunshine	Released: September 21, 2010; Label: Capitol	17	5	34	—	—	—	—	—	
All People	Released: July 30, 2013; Label: Capitol	30	4	—	—	25	—	—	—	
SoulRocker	Released: June 3, 2016; Label: Fantasy	38	5	—	175	96	—	—	—	
Stay Human, Vol. II	Released: January 25, 2019; Label: Thirty Tigers	62	9	— (Note: Stay Human Vol. II did not enter the ARIA Albums Chart, but peaked at number 23 on the ARIA Digital Albums Chart.)	—	—	—	—	—	
Work Hard & Be Nice	Released: June 19, 2020; Label: Thirty Tigers	— (Note: Stay Human Vol. II did not enter the Billboard 200, but peaked at number 16 on the US Album Sales Chart.)	48	—	—	—	—	—	—	
Follow Your Heart	Released: June 3, 2022; Label: Thirty Tigers	—	—	—	—	—	—	—	—	—
Big Big Love	Released: November 3, 2023; Label: Thirty Tigers	—	—	—	—	—	—	—	—	—
"—" denotes a recording that did not chart or was not released in that territory.

==== Singles ====
- 1994: "Of Course You Can" UK No. 74
- 1994: "People in tha Middle" AUS No. 69, UK No. 49
- 1995: "Hole in the Bucket" AUS No. 87, UK No. 55
- 1995: "Positive"
- 1997: "U Can't Sing R Song"
- 1997: "Why Oh Why" UK No. 45
- 1997: "Rebel Music (3 O'Clock Roadblock)" (feat. Stephen Marley) (promo-only)
- 1997: "Keep Me Lifted"
- 2001: "Rock the Nation"
- 2001: "Sometimes"
- 2002: "Soulshine" (Australia-only EP)
- 2003: "Bomb the World" AUS No. 70
- 2003: "Everyone Deserves Music" AUS No. 39
- 2006: "I Know I'm Not Alone" #27 US AAA
- 2006: "Light up Ya Lighter"
- 2008: "Obama Song" (feat. SoliLaquists of Sound, Cherine Anderson & Anthony B) (Digital Only)
- 2008: "Say Hey (I Love You)" No. 18 US #14 US AAA
- 2009: "Hey World" #21 US AAA
- 2010: "Shake It" (feat. Lady Saw)
- 2010: "The Sound of Sunshine" (feat. Jovanotti, for Italy only) #1 US AAA
- 2010: "Hey Hey Hey" #5 US AAA
- 2011: "I'll Be Waiting" #22 US AAA
- 2013: "I'm Alive (Life Sounds Like)" #5 US AAA
- 2013: "Life is Better With You" #13 US AAA
- 2013: "11 59" (feat. Sonna Rele)
- 2014: "Same As It Ever Was (Start Today)"
- 2015: "Once A Day" (feat. Sonna Rele) #17 US AAA
- 2018: "The Flower" (feat. Victoria Canal)
- 2020: "I Got You" #1 US AAA
- 2020: "Work Hard and Be Nice" #40 US AAA
- 2021: "Good Day for a Good Day" #24 US AAA
- 2023: "Hands Up To the Sky" #29 US AAA
- 2025: "Break Up With Everything" #32 US AAA

==== Live albums and compilations ====
- 1994: Stolen Moments: Red Hot + Cool
- 1998: Red Hot + Rhapsody
- 1998: Hempilation, Vol. 2: Free the Weed
- 2005: Weeds (Music from the Original TV Series)
- 2005: Live in Sydney
- 2005: Love Kamikaze (Singles and Remixes)
- 2005: Live: Alaska
- 2005: Power to the Peaceful Festival 2005 (CD & DVD)
- 2006: Snakes on a Plane: The Album
- 2007: Yell Fire! Live
- 2008: CLIF GreenNotes Protect the Places We Play
- 2008: The Wire: And All the Pieces Matter -- Five Years of Music from The Wire

=== Collaborations ===
- 1992: Infinity within (album) (Deee-Lite, "Fuddy Duddy Judge" feat. Michael Franti)
- 1994: Echomania (Dub Syndicate, "No No" feat. Michael Franti)
- 1995: Blue in the Face (Movie Soundtrack) ("To My Ba-Bay!" w/ Spearhead & Zap Mama)
- 1997: Seven, "Poetry Man" (with Zap Mama and King Britt) and "Baba Hooker" (with Zap Mama)
- 1997: Black Enough? (Steel Pulse feat. Michael Franti of Spearhead)
- 1999: Dal Basso (Jovanotti feat. Michael Franti)
- 2001: Stay Human, "Listener Supported" (with Zap Mama)
  Steady Pull (Jonatha Brooke feat. Michael Franti)
- 2002: 1 Giant Leap (Jamie Catto & Duncan Bridgeman, "Passion" feat. Michael Franti)
- 2003: The World Around (Buscemi feat. Michael Franti)
  Little Drummer Boy (Blind Boys Of Alabama feat. Michael Franti)
  There's Enough For All Of Us (Hardage feat. Michael Franti)
  My Love (E-Life feat. Michael Franti)
- 2005: Look at All the Love We Found: A Tribute To Sublime ("What I Got" w/ Michael Franti & Spearhead featuring Gift of Gab)
- 2006: What's This? (Franti, Gabriel Ríos and Flip Kowlier)
- 2007: Supermoon, "Hey Brotha" (with Zap Mama)
- 2008: Mani libere 2008 (Jovanotti feat. Michael Franti)
  The End (Sugarush Beat Company feat. Michael Franti)
- 2009: All Rebel Rockers, "High Low" (with Zap Mama)
- 2010: El Vecindario, "Monkey Man" (with Macaco)
- 2011: Battiti di ali di farfalla (with Lorenzo Jovanotti Cherubini)
- 2011: The Sound of Sunshine (with Lorenzo Jovanotti Cherubini)
  "P.O.W." (With Honest Bob)(From the album The Game)
  "I Love The Future + Praize Creation Dub + Dignity Of Struggle" (With The Fire This Time)(From the album Still Dancing On John Waynes Head)
- 2014: È Tardi (with Caparezza)
- 2014: I Believe (with SOJA and Nahko Bear)

=== The Beatnigs ===
- 1988: The Beatnigs

=== The Disposable Heroes of Hiphoprisy ===
- 1992: Hypocrisy Is the Greatest Luxury
- 1993: Spare Ass Annie and Other Tales (with William S. Burroughs)

=== Appearances in media ===
Franti's music was featured twice on HBO's urban drama The Wire. "Oh My God" and "Rock The Nation", both from the album Stay Human, were used in two different episodes during the series' first season. Franti's song "Everybody Ona Move" was featured in the pilot episode of Privileged on the CW in 2008 and also in a 2009 PlayStation 3 commercial. "Yell Fire" was used to promote the FX channel series Rescue Me and was also used in the closing credits of the pilot episode of Virtuality on Fox. Showtime's Weeds featured Franti's song "Ganja Babe" in its first season, his interpretation of the Weeds theme song "Little Boxes" in Season 3, and "Say Hey" during a flash mob scene in the premiere episode of Season 5. Boston Red Sox centerfielder Shane Victorino uses the song "Light up Ya Lighter" as his batter walk-up music. "Say Hey (I Love You)" was used on the third episode of NBC's series Mercy, as well as in the opening scene of the 2010 film Valentine's Day. The same song was also used in 2010 in a commercial for Corona Light beer. The song is also featured on the soundtrack of EA Sports game, 2010 FIFA World Cup South Africa.

He appeared as himself in the 2010 music documentary Sounds Like a Revolution.

"I'm Alive (Life Sounds Like)" was featured on the "Arrival" official trailer for The Sims 4 during Gamescom 2013 at the Cologne Trade Fair in Cologne, Germany on August 20, 2013. It was also featured in the launch trailer for Rayman Legends and the final trailer for Coco.

Franti has collaborated with Slacker Radio, picking the tunes and providing commentaries, to create a radio station playing his favorite artists.

Franti premiered his own documentary Stay Human on April 27, 2018, at the Asbury Park Music and Film Festival. Written on his website about the film, Franti states, "my new film Stay Human takes us on a journey through music and stories of some of the most inspiring individuals on the planet. Amazing people that I've met on my travels around the globe, who have chosen to overcome cynicism with optimism, hope, tenacity, music, and love – and remind us all what it means to STAY HUMAN."

A2 Milk Co used an arrangement of "Life is Better with You" as the soundtrack to its US national TV ad campaign in October 2019. The advertisement was shown on ABC, NBC, Bravo, Food Network and HGTV networks during major shows.

== See also ==
- List of barefooters
