= Say Hey (I Love You) =

2008 single by Michael Franti and Cherine Anderson

Single by Michael Franti & Spearhead featuring Cherine Anderson

from the album All Rebel Rockers
- Released: September 11, 2008
- Recorded: 2008
- Genre: Dancehall; reggae fusion; hip hop; pop; rock
- Length: 3:55 (Album Version); 3:40 (Radio Edit)
- Label: ANTI-
- Songwriters: Michael Franti, Carl Young

Michael Franti & Spearhead featuring Cherine Anderson singles chronology
"Say Hey (I Love You)" (2008)	"Shake It" (2010)

"Say Hey (I Love You)" is a single by American reggae band Michael Franti & Spearhead featuring Jamaican soul singer Cherine Anderson released in 2008 from their album All Rebel Rockers. The single was produced by Sly & Robbie. The music video peaked at number 5 on the VH1 Top 20 countdown and the single peaked at number 18 on the Billboard Hot 100, becoming the band's first Hot 100 chart entry. It also peaked at number 3 on Billboard Digital Songs, number 1 on Billboard R&B Songs, and number 3 on Billboard Modern Rock Songs. Digital sales of "Say Hey (I Love You)" have topped 120,000 downloads.

The music video for this song was filmed at Vigário Geral favela in Rio de Janeiro, Brazil.

== Background ==
In a January 2010 interview, Franti explained he wrote the lyrics to this song in the steam of a mirror just after a shower. He joked to noted UK R&B writer Pete Lewis of the award-winning Blues & Soul: "I was staying at (US actor) Woody Harrelson's house. And, when Woody called and asked how the songwriting was going, I was like 'It's going great! I think I just wrote a hit song in the bathroom!'... And straightaway he was like 'So, is it a Number One or a Number Two?'!!"

== Use in other media ==
On April 15, 2009, Craig Ferguson did a lipsync of the song with his cast and puppets on "The Late Late Show With Craig Ferguson". The song appeared in the Showtime series Weeds for a flash mob in the season five premiere episode and during the opening credits of the 2010 film Valentine's Day. It also appeared in the 2010 films Ramona and Beezus and The Back-Up Plan and the 2011 films Bucky Larson: Born to Be a Star and Alvin and the Chipmunks: Chipwrecked. This song is featured in EA Sports video game 2010 FIFA World Cup South Africa. It was also featured in a 2010 advertisement for Corona Light beer, and in advertisements for The Oprah Winfrey Show's final season. Franti recorded a version with alternate lyrics in support of the San Francisco Giants in connection with their World Series appearance in 2010. The song is featured in the 2015 animated musical comedy Strange Magic. It is played in the sequel Beverly Hills Chihuahua 2.

== Chart positions ==
=== Weekly ===
Chart (2008–2010)	Peak position
Belgium (Ultratip Bubbling Under Flanders)	22
Canada Hot 100 (Billboard)	72
New Zealand (Recorded Music NZ)	33
US Billboard Hot 100	18
US Adult Alternative Airplay (Billboard)	14
US Adult Contemporary (Billboard)	17
US Adult Pop Airplay (Billboard)	5
US Hot Rock & Alternative Songs (Billboard)	40
US Pop Airplay (Billboard)	17

=== Year-end ===
Chart (2009)	Position
US Billboard Hot 100	97
US Adult Top 40 (Billboard)	28

== Cover versions ==
The song was covered for the 2015 film Strange Magic.

== Certifications ==
Country	Certification (sales thresholds)
United States	2× Platinum
