= Everyone Deserves Music =

Studio album by Michael Franti & Spearhead
- Released: June 17, 2003
- Recorded: The Sugar Shack, in San Francisco, California
- Genre: Hip hop, funk, reggae fusion
- Length: 53:00
- Language: English
- Label: Boo Boo Wax / iMusic
- Producer: Michael Franti, Robbie Shakespeare, Sly Dunbar

Michael Franti & Spearhead chronology
Stay Human (2001)	''Everyone Deserves Music'' (2003)	Live in Sydney (2005)

Professional ratings
Review scores
Source	Rating
AllMusic	4.5/5 stars
Austin Chronicle	3/5 stars
The Guardian	3/5 stars
PopMatters	(mixed)

Everyone Deserves Music is the fourth studio release by Michael Franti & Spearhead.

== Track listing ==
All songs written by Michael Franti, Dave Shul and Carl Young except where indicated.

1. "What I Be" (4:45)
2. "We Don't Stop" (Franti, Shul, Young, Wood Farguheson, Jr., Tim Parker) (4:36)
3. "Everyone Deserves Music" (4:36)
4. "Never Too Late" (4:50)
5. "Bomb the World" (4:28)
6. "Pray for Grace" (4:52)
7. "Love, Why Did You Go Away" (4:29)
8. "Yes I Will" (4:01)
9. "Feelin' Free" (3:54)
10. "Love Invincible" (3:50)
11. "Bomb the World (Armageddon Version)" (Franti, Shul, Young, Farguheson) (4:44)
12. "Crazy, Crazy, Crazy" (3:30)

== Charts ==
Chart (2003)	Peak position
Australian Albums (ARIA)	9
Belgian Albums (Ultratop Flanders)	28
Dutch Albums (Album Top 100)	34
New Zealand Albums (RMNZ)	26
US Heatseeker Albums (Billboard)	25

== Certifications ==
Region	Certification	Certified units/sales
Australia (ARIA)	Gold	35,000^{^}
^{^} Shipments figures based on certification alone.
