= The Disposable Heroes of Hiphoprisy =

American hip hop band

- Michael Franti and Rono Tse

Background information
- Origin: Bay Area, San Francisco, United States
- Genres: Hip-hop, industrial hip-hop, alternative hip-hop, political hip-hop, spoken word poetry
- Years active: 1990–1993
- Labels: 4th & B'way, Island
- Past members: Michael Franti; Rono Tse; Charlie Hunter; Simone White

The Disposable Heroes of Hiphoprisy were an American hip-hop musical ensemble, active during the early 1990s. The band was formed in 1990 by Michael Franti (vocals, production, misc. instruments) and Rono Tse (drums, percussion, programming), who had worked together in The Beatnigs. They released two albums, the critically acclaimed Hypocrisy Is the Greatest Luxury in 1992, and Spare Ass Annie and Other Tales (with William S. Burroughs) in 1993.

Their first live performance was on August 23, 1991 at the Kennel Club in San Francisco.

The group was associated with contemporary bands, including House of Pain and Pop Will Eat Itself. They also were somewhat reminiscent of Gil Scott-Heron due to the half-spoken vocal styles of Franti and the up-front political messages in the music. The Disposable Heroes played many concerts, sometimes opening the bill for more well-known acts such as U2 (on their landmark Zoo TV Tour), Rage Against the Machine, Nirvana and Arrested Development. Guitarist Charlie Hunter made his recording debut with the Disposable Heroes before earning fame in jazz.

== Career ==
Michael Franti and Rono Tse had both been members of industrial hip-hop band The Beatnigs, which released one album on Alternative Tentacles and undertook several international tours before breaking up.

Explaining the name of the new group, The Disposable Heroes of Hiphoprisy, Franti said in 1992 that

"If you're a young black person, your only role models are athletes and entertainers. You see these people used by the corporate system to make money, after which they're thrown on the scrap heap. they're disposable heroes...the name Hiphoprisy deals with the fact that, inevitably, there is hypocrisy in all of our lives, including mine"

Their debut album, Hypocrisy Is the Greatest Luxury, received critical and underground acclaim upon its release in 1992, but was not commercially successful. Franti's lyrics address a wide range of social issues, from Mass Media bias and abuse ("Television, the Drug of the Nation") to racial equality ("Socio-Genetic Experiment", in large part inspired by Franti's childhood as a biracial child adopted by a white family), and Homophobia (in "Language of Violence"). The album also included a cover of the Dead Kennedys track "California über alles" (with updated lyrics about Governor Pete Wilson). "Television," which received wide airplay on college and alternative radio stations, had previously been recorded by Michael Franti's first band, The Beatnigs. In common with other bands of the time on both sides of the Atlantic Ocean, the Disposable Heroes of Hiphoprisy used sampling and scratching as a primary tool of music recording, and mixed rock, hip-hop and jazz. The album was listed in the book 1001 Albums You Must Hear Before You Die.

Among their contemporaries, the band had strong artistic, political, and personal ties to both Meat Beat Manifesto and Consolidated. The recording of Hypocrisy is the Greatest Luxury was co-produced by Consolidated's Mark Pistel, and prolific Meat Beat Manifesto frontman Jack Dangers assisted with mixing.

In 1993, the duo worked with William S. Burroughs, recording music for a collaborative album entitled Spare Ass Annie and Other Tales. This album diverged greatly from the style of the band's previous work, as they were largely providing musical background and accompaniment to Burroughs' spoken readings from several of his books. The Disposable Heroes split up shortly after.

Peter Jenner, who had managed Pink Floyd and The Clash, managed the group.

== Legacy ==
Michael Franti later formed Spearhead, while Tse worked with the Mystik Journeymen. In 1995, Franti said of Spearhead "The big problem with Disposable Heroes was that it was a record people listened to because it was good for them - kind of like broccoli. I want Spearhead to be more like sweet potatoes."

The style of turntablism developed by the Disposable Heroes of Hiphoprisy was influential on DJ Product©1969, who credited his work, including as a member of the rap rock band Hed PE, as being influenced by Disposable Heroes.

"Television, the Drug of The Nation" was listed at number 401 on NME's The 500 Greatest Songs of All Time in 2014.

== Discography ==
=== Albums ===
- Hypocrisy Is the Greatest Luxury (1992)
- Spare Ass Annie and Other Tales (1993)

=== Singles ===
- "(What Do I Do To Become) Famous and Dandy" (Worker's Playtime, 1990)
- "Television, The Drug of the Nation" EP (4th and Broadway, 1991)
- "Language of Violence" (4th and Broadway, 1992)
- "Live Television" (4th and Broadway, 1992)
