= Yell Fire! =

2006 studio album by Michael Franti and Spearhead

Studio album by Michael Franti and Spearhead
- Released: July 25, 2006
- Genre: Hip hop, alternative rock, reggae, funk, reggae fusion
- Length: 66:37
- Label: ANTI-/Liberation
- Producer: Michael Franti, Malouf

Michael Franti and Spearhead chronology
Love Kamikaze (Singles and Remixes) (2005)	Yell Fire! (2006)	All Rebel Rockers (2008)

Professional ratings
Review scores
Source	Rating
AllMusic	4/5 stars

Yell Fire! is the fifth studio album by the reggae-influenced band Michael Franti and Spearhead. It was inspired by Michael Franti's trip to the Middle East, visiting Iraq, Israel, and the Palestinian territories. It is a politically charged album, with each track focusing on a controversial issue. The album was recorded in Kingston, Jamaica and San Francisco and released on July 25, 2006, by ANTI- and Liberation Records.

In the album's first week of sales, it had sold 7,215 copies and by March 28, 2007, Yell Fire! had sold 62,755 copies. In the U.S. the album peaked at No. 125 on the Billboard 200, but also peaked at No. 6 on Independent Albums and No. 1 on Heatseeker Albums.

== Track listing ==
No.	Title	Writer(s)	Length
1.	"Time to Go Home"	Michael Franti, Dave Shul, Carl Young	5:10
2.	"Yell Fire!"	Franti, Shul, Young	4:44
3.	"I Know I'm Not Alone"	Franti, Shul, Young	4:04
4.	"East to the West"	J Bowman, Franti	3:56
5.	"Sweet Little Lies"	Franti, Shul, Young	4:43
6.	"Hello Bonjour"	Franti	4:50
7.	"One Step Closer to You" (feat. Pink)	Franti	4:41
8.	"Hey Now Now"	Woodrowe Farguheson, Franti, Manas Itene	5:36
9.	"Everybody Ona Move"	Franti, Shul, Young	5:49
10.	"See You in the Light"	Franti	4:18
11.	"Light Up Ya Lighter"	Franti, Itene	4:57
12.	"What I've Seen"	Bowman, Franti	4:52
13.	"Tolerance"	Franti	3:49
14.	"Is Love Enough?" (feat. Gentleman)	Franti, Itene	5:08

== Charts ==
Chart performance for Yell Fire!
Chart (2006)	Peak position
Australian Albums (ARIA)	14
Belgian Albums (Ultratop Flanders)	19
Dutch Albums (Album Top 100)	20
US Billboard 200	125
US Top Independent Albums (Billboard)	6
