= Bomb the World =

Single by Michael Franti & Spearhead

from the album Everyone Deserves Music
- Released: 2003
- Genre: Alternative rock, art rock
- Length: 4:28
- Songwriter(s): Michael Franti, David Shul, Carl Young

"Bomb the World" is a protest song single by Michael Franti & Spearhead from their album "Everyone Deserves Music". The Independent has called it "Franti's s response to September 11".

A remix called "Bomb The World" (Armageddon Mix) was produced by reggae/funk performers Sly and Robbie.

== Reception ==
In 2003, the New Internationalist described the song as "the anthem of a new generation of anti-war protesters", praising its "stirring chorus" and its "coda ready-made for marching". In 2015, however, the Chicago Tribune called it "a lighthearted, mid-tempo pop song that recalls Bob Marley and Johnny Nash."

== Track listings ==
US CD

1. "Bomb The World" (LP version) – 4:28
2. "Bomb The World" (Armageddon version) – 4:44

== Official versions ==
- "Bomb The World" (LP version) – 4:28
- "Bomb The World" (Armageddon version) – 4:44
