= The Sound of Sunshine (song) =

Single by Michael Franti & Spearhead

from the album The Sound of Sunshine
- Released: June 1, 2010
- Recorded: December 2009 – May 2010
- Genre: Indie pop, reggae fusion
- Length: 3:45
- Label: Capitol, Boo Boo Wax
- Songwriters: Michael Franti, Jason Bowman, Carl Young
- Producers: Michael Franti, Sly & Robbie

Michael Franti & Spearhead singles chronology
"Shake It" (2010)	"The Sound of Sunshine" (2010)	"Hey Hey Hey" (2011)

"The Sound of Sunshine" is a single by Michael Franti & Spearhead and also the title track from their album of the same name (2010). It was written by Franti, Jason Bowman and Carl Young and produced by Franti with additional production by Sly & Robbie. It was released as the album's second single on June 1, 2010 and was digitally released on June 8, 2010.

The song is featured in the films Yogi Bear, Soul Surfer, and Blue Crush 2.

== Music video ==
The music video for "The Sound of Sunshine" was directed by Frank Borin and Michael Franti . It was filmed in Venice, California in late August 2010 and released on September 21, 2010.

In an interview with Spinner, Frantí said about the video, "We shot the video on Venice Beach in California because people from so many different walks of life come there to have a great time; to let go and let the sun shine in. These days there is much to worry about. The economy, climate change, war or just making it through a rough day. 'The Sound of Sunshine' is a song about the sun's ability to make any day better."

An alternate official music video was created for the song featuring Jovanotti (with lyrics partly in Italian and partly in English). The new version was filmed in the Lombardy's countryside around Pavia, Italy and released on June 28, 2011.

== Charts and certifications ==
=== Charts ===
Weekly chart performance for "The Sound of Sunshine"
Chart (2010–2011)	Peak position
German Airplay (Nielsen Company)	23
Italy (FIMI)	3
Japan (Japan Hot 100)	56
Switzerland (Schweizer Hitparade)	62
US Bubbling Under Hot 100 Singles (Billboard)	23
US Adult Alternative Songs (Billboard)	1
US Adult Top 40 (Billboard)	21
US Rock Songs (Billboard)	33

Annual chart rankings for "The Sound of Sunshine"
Chart (2011)	Rank
Italy (Musica e dischi)	23

=== Certifications ===
Certifications and sales for "The Sound of Sunshine"
Region	Certification	Certified units/sales
Italy (FIMI)	Platinum	30,000^{*}
^{*} Sales figures based on certification alone.
