= Jeremy Greene =

Jeremy A. Greene

Academic work
- Discipline: Medicine, History of Medicine
- Sub-discipline: History of the generic drug industry
- Institutions: Johns Hopkins School of Medicine

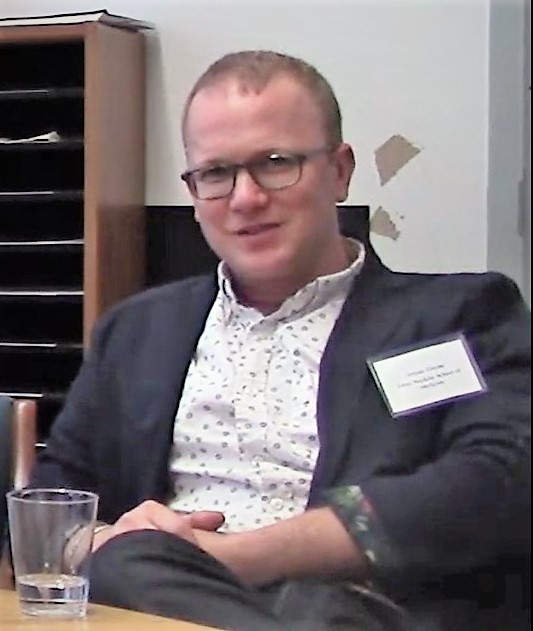
Greene at the 2017 National Conference for Physician Scholars in the Social Sciences and Humanities (SHSSM)

Jeremy A. Greene is the William H. Welch Professor of Medicine and the History of Medicine at Johns Hopkins School of Medicine.

== Career ==
Greene is a professor of Medicine and History of Medicine at Johns Hopkins School of Medicine. Greene has studied the generic drug industry. His work appears in Slate.

== Works ==
- Prescribing by Numbers: Drugs and the Definition of Disease, Johns Hopkins University Press, 2008, ISBN 9780801891007
- Generic: The Unbranding of Modern Medicine. JHU Press. 20 August 2014. ISBN 978-1-4214-1493-5.
- The Doctor Who Wasn't There: Technology, History, and the Limits of Telehealth. University of Chicago Press, 2022. ISBN 978-0226800899.
