= Cherine Anderson =

Jamaican vocalist and actress

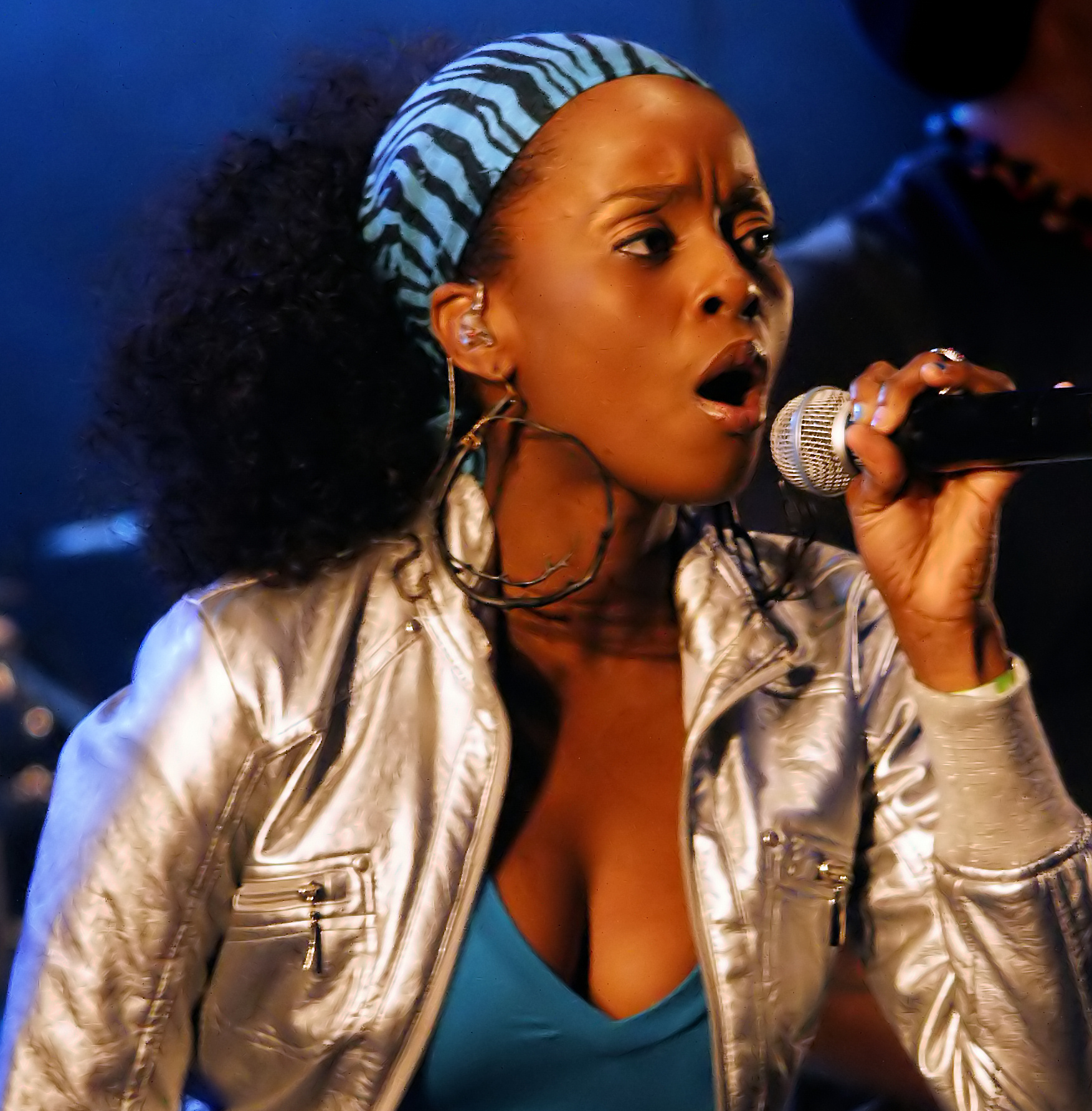

Background information
- Born: 25 September 1984 (age 42); Kingston, Jamaica
- Genres: Soul; Dancehall; Reggae fusion Reggae; R&B; Hip hop Rock
- Occupations: Singer, songwriter, actress, video director
- Instruments: Vocals, guitar
- Years active: Music: 2006–present Film: 1997–present
- Label: Dancehall Soul/Zlink Ent.

Cherine Tanya Anderson (born 25 September 1984, Rockfort, East Kingston, Jamaica) is a Jamaican dancehall/reggae vocalist and actress.

== Biography ==
Anderson's acting career began in the film Dancehall Queen (1997), as Marcia's pressured, teenage daughter Tanya; she is also known for playing the character Serena in the 2003 Jamaican film, One Love.

Anderson has worked and performed with Sly and Robbie, Sting, Wyclef Jean, Bootsy Collins, Jimmy Cliff, Michael Franti and others. She contributed to several Independent Online Distribution Alliance compilation releases prior to the success of her January 2006 single, "Good Love", which appeared on a compilation showcasing the riddim of Jimmy Riley's "Love & Devotion". "Good Love" appeared on the 2008 Grammy nominated album, Anniversary, by Sly and Robbie and the Taxi Gang.

In 2006, Anderson collaborated with Chuck Fenda on the single, "Coming Over", which rose to number one on the Jamaican charts, and remained in the Top 30 for 26 weeks. She also collaborated with Britney Spears on the Sly and Robbie remix of "Piece of Me".

Anderson made her directorial debut in 2007 when she directed the music video for "Kingston State of Mind". The song would eventually top the Caribbean video charts and remained in the Top 10 for four months. Wyclef Jean is featured on the remix to "Kingston State of Mind"

Anderson opened for Wyclef Jean in Tortola, British Virgin Islands in 2007, and she was a featured vocalist on Sly and Robbie and the Taxi Gang's United States/Canada tour the same year.

In late 2007, Anderson collaborated with Michael Franti and Spearhead on their All Rebel Rockers album. She was also featured on the single "Say Hey (I Love You)", as well as the tracks "Sound System" and "Little Bit of Riddem". In 2008 through 2009, Anderson toured extensively with Franti and Spearhead as their opening act in North America, Australia and Europe.

Anderson is the first Jamaican female artist to hit the Billboard Rock charts featured on the song "Say Hey, I Love You" with Michael Franti & Spearhead. The song simultaneously peaked six Billboard charts and was placed on the soundtrack of numerous films and TV commercials including the EA 2010 FIFA World Cup South Africa Music Soundtrack. She dominated both local and international reggae charts with her single "Shine on Jamaica" from her EP The Introduction-Dubstyle EP. "Shine On Jamaica" peaked at number 1 for four weeks on both the NY Reggae charts and South Florida reggae charts. The EP also produced reggae hits such as "Talk If Yuh Talking" and "Kingston State of Mind". "Shine On Jamaica" was also featured on the 2011 Grammy-nominated album for Sly & Robbie "One Pop Reggae". As a result, she was honored with the award for Best Female Vocalist of the year 2010 at the Jamaica Excellence In Music Awards as well as Female Vocalist of Year at Stone Love Awards. Cherine continues to dominate Jamaican radio and stays relevant in the dancehall with the smash hit "Haffi Come Back" as well as the collaboration "Rebel" with D.I.

She has toured with artists such as John Mayer (Battle Studies North American Tour (2010)), Counting Crows, Slightly Stoopid, Sly & Robbie, Augustana among others. Cherine has performed at festivals such as

- Coachella - USA (2009)
- Bluesfest - Australia (2009)
- Rototom Festival- Italy (2009)
- Summer Jam - Germany (2009)
- Arras Main Square Fest - France (2009)
- Your World Festival - Holland (2009)
- Rock-Zottegem Festival - Belgium (2009)
- Sierra Nevada world Music Festival - USA (2009, 2012)
- Mountain Jam Festival - USA (2009)
- UCLA Jazz & Reggae Festival - USA (2009, 2006)
- Earthdance - USA (2009)
- Rebel Salute - Jamaica (2009)
- Ragga Muffins Festival - USA (2008)
- Hollywood Bowl KCRW Series - USA (2008)
- Hollywood Bowl Reggae Series - USA (2007)
- Reggae Rising - USA (2007)
- Big Day Out – British Columbia (2007)
- BVI Festival - Virgin Island (British) (2007)
- Reggae Sumfest – Jamaica (2007, 2006)
- STING - Jamaica (2007, 2009)
- Reggae on the River – USA (2006)
- International Reggae Day - Jamaica (2006)

She performed at three events (The Green Ball, The Inaugural Peace Ball, Rock The Vote/Calvin Klein Inaugural Party) to commemorate President Barack Obama's inauguration.

Anderson's first official product, The Introduction-Dubstyle EP, was released in March 2009. The EP included reggae chart toppers such as "Shine On Jamaica", "Talk If Yuh Talking", "Kingston State of Mind", "Shine on Jamaica" and "Coming Over Tonight".

Coupled with the success of dominating both dancehall and reggae charts, she has also been tapped for an array of A-list philanthropic projects. Anderson updated her spokesperson repertoire by agreeing to lend her star power to Yoplait and Jamaica Cancer Society's Breast Cancer Campaign since 2010, which raised over $3.5 million JMD to benefit breast cancer victims. Anderson was also aligned with the United Nations-backed "Way Out Project", an initiative to end violence and endorse gender equality, which is run jointly by the UN and the Bureau of Women's Affairs. Additionally, her Reach One Child "R.O.C" Foundation, which she founded in 2004, remains committed to providing mentorship and motivational talks as well as need based scholarships to youths in Jamaica. In early 2012, Anderson and a team of Reach One Child volunteers embarked on the R.O.C Jamaica School Tour, with a mission to engage teens in inner-city communities in discussions on topics such as teen pregnancy, violence, violence against women as well as making education their priority, in order to secure a better future. In 2013, she launched the ROC Scholarship Program to support scholastic excellence and encourage community building among public school sixth grade students with financial need, as they move into secondary school. In October of the same year the R.O.C Foundation joined forces with CherineTV to launch the Save Our Girls campaign to support the Jamaica Cancer Society's breast cancer research efforts.
