= The Beatnigs =

American industrial band

- Origin: San Francisco, United States
- Genres: Industrial hip-hop, political hip-hop, avant-garde, spoken word poetry, punk
- Years active: 1986–1990
- Spinoffs: The Disposable Heroes of Hiphoprisy, Michael Franti & Spearhead, Broun Fellinis, The Crack Emcee, Consolidated (band), Little White Radio, U.A.F., HEADBOLT, Until December
- Past members: Michael Franti; Kevin Carnes; Rono Tse; Henry Flood; Andre Flores; Louis 'Troy' Dixon

The Beatnigs were a San Francisco-based band active between 1986 and 1990, influenced by industrial music, hip-hop and hardcore punk.

== Biography ==
Kevin Carnes and Adam Sherburne knew each other from playing in Houston, TX. Michael Franti and Rono Tse met each other clubbing in San Francisco. In 1986, Franti and Tse formed the band with Carnes, Andre Flores and Henry Flood. Louis 'Troy' Dixon (AKA The Crack Emcee) joined later as a touring member.

In 1988, The Beatnigs released a self-titled studio album and a 12" EP of their most famous song, "Television". Both on the record label Alternative Tentacles. That same year they played their New York City debut at the New Music Seminar, and recorded for the BBC's Peel Sessions. The band toured with Billy Bragg and Michelle Shocked in both the United States and the United Kingdom. Other groups they performed with include D.O.A., MDC, Fugazi, Living Colour and Einstürzende Neubauten.

=== Post breakup ===
Franti and Tse would later form The Disposable Heroes of Hiphoprisy. They reworked the Beatnigs song "Television" to become "Television, The Drug of the Nation" for the new group. Kevin Carnes would later form Broun Fellinis (with The Crack Emcee, again, as a touring member). Adam Sherburne would later form Until December and Consolidated. Louis 'Troy' Dixon would later form The Crack Emcee and Little White Radio (with Kevin Carnes on drums). The Crack Emcee would also be featured on the Consolidated release "Play More Music".

== Style ==
The band's stage performance could include nudity, and the use of power tools such as a rotary saw and grinder on a metal bar to create industrial noise and pyrotechnics. Their sound included poetry and elements of African drumming. They were described in The Rough Guide to Rock as "a kind of avant-garde industrial jazz poets collective".

== Discography ==
=== Albums ===
- The Beatnigs (1988)

=== Singles ===
- The Beatnigs - Television EP (An ON U Sound Mix) (1988)

== Legacy ==
The single "Television" was reissued by Alternative Tentacles in 2002, and the album was planned for a CD re-release while made available on iTunes and other digital retailers.

According to KQED, Beatnigs' and Disposable Heroes of Hiphoprisy's influence can be heard in artists such as JPEGMAFIA and Death Grips.
