= Spare Ass Annie and Other Tales =

Studio album by William Burroughs with the Disposable Heroes of Hiphoprisy
- Released: September 28, 1993
- Genre: Spoken word
- Length: 47:45
- Label: Island
- Producer: Hal Willner

The Disposable Heroes of Hiphoprisy chronology
Hypocrisy Is the Greatest Luxury (1992)	Spare Ass Annie and Other Tales (1993)

Professional ratings
Review scores
Source	Rating
AllMusic	4/5 stars
Chicago Tribune	3.5/4 stars
Edmonton Journal	3/5 stars
Philadelphia Inquirer	2.5/4 stars

Spare Ass Annie and Other Tales is a spoken word collaboration featuring William S. Burroughs reading excerpts from his books set to music by the Disposable Heroes of Hiphoprisy. The album was produced by Hal Willner. Critical response to the album was positive.

== Track listing ==
1. "Interlude 1" (0:23)
2. "Spare Ass Annie" (4:30)
3. "Interlude 2" (0:20)
4. "The Last Words of Dutch Schultz" (2:22)
5. "Interlude 3" (0:17)
6. "Mildred Pierce Reporting" (2:05)
7. "Dr. Benway Operates" (2:45)
8. "Warning to Young Couples" (2:13)
9. "Did I Ever Tell You About the Man That Taught His Asshole to Talk?" (6:18)
10. "Last Words with Ras I. Zulu" (1:02)
11. "A One God Universe" (3:32)
12. "Interlude 4" (0:36)
13. "The Junky's Christmas" (15:54)
14. "Words of Advice for Young People" (4:41)
15. "Last Words with Michael Franti" (0:47)

== Film adaptation ==
Burroughs' recording of "The Junky's Christmas" was used as the soundtrack for a stop-motion animation short film of the same title, released in 1993 and directed by Nick Donkin and Melodie McDaniel, which also incorporated live-action footage of Burroughs.
