= Rod Lee =

American rapper

Rod Lee is an American, Baltimore, Maryland-based DJ, record producer, and party MC. who is known for the popularization of Baltimore Club music. Described as "the original don of Baltimore Club" by The Washington Post, in 2005 he released "Vol. 5: the Official," a DJ mix that was the first Baltimore Club CD to be distributed nationally. His productions have contributed to the success of local stars like Bossman and Paula Campbell. He is the founder and owner of the Club Kingz record label. and has independently released four mixtapes that have circulated around the mid-Atlantic, but primarily within his native city of Baltimore.

Lee is popular among Baltimore club-goers and Baltimore Club music fans.

His song "Dance My Pain Away" was featured on the soundtrack to the HBO series, The Wire.
