= Stay Human (album) =

Studio album by Michael Franti & Spearhead
- Released: May 15, 2001
- Recorded: The Sugar Shack, in San Francisco, California
- Genre: Hip hop
- Language: English
- Label: Boo Boo Wax / Six Degrees
- Producer: Michael Franti

Michael Franti & Spearhead chronology
Live at the Baobab (2000)	''Stay Human'' (2001)	Everyone Deserves Music (2003)

Professional ratings
Review scores
Source	Rating
AllMusic	4/5 stars
Robert Christgau	(2-star Honorable Mention)
Vibe	4.5/5 stars

Stay Human is the third studio release by Michael Franti & Spearhead. Many of the tracks on this album are fictional radio segments focusing on the case of "Sister Fatima" who is executed later in the album for murder. At the album's end, new evidence reveals Sister Fatima was innocent, and Governor Franklin Shane, who authorized the execution in order to boost his re-election campaign, commits suicide. In the radio segments, Governor Shane is played by Woody Harrelson.

== Track listing ==
1. "Oh My God" (Franti, Ramon Lazo) (5:07)
2. "Radio Segment" (0:53)
3. "Stay Human (All the Freaky People)" (Franti, Young) (4:27)
4. "Radio Segment" (0:59)
5. "Rock the Nation" (Franti, Young) (4:26)
6. "Sometimes" (Franti, Shul) (4:05)
7. "Radio Segment" (1:26)
8. "Do Ya Love" (Franti, Young) (4:50)
9. "Radio Segment" (1:18)
10. "Soulshine" (Franti) (3:58)
11. "Every Single Soul" (Franti, Ramon Lazo, Quintana, Shul, Young) (5:44)
12. "Radio Segment" (1:02)
13. "Love'll Set Me Free" (Franti, Shul, Young) (3:57)
14. "Thank You" (Franti, Ramon Lazo, Shul, Young) (4:55)
15. "Radio Segment" (2:30)
16. "We Don't Mind" (Franti, Ramon Lazo) (4:49)
17. "Radio Segment" (0:50)
18. "Speaking of Tongues" (Franti) (4:45)
19. "Radio Segment" (1:36)
20. "Listener Supported" (Franti, Marie Daulne) (4:38)
21. "Radio Segment" (0:44)
22. "Skin on the Drum" (Franti) (6:19)

Tracks 2, 4, 7, 9, 17, 21 are performed by Brother Soulshine and The Nubian Poetess
Tracks 12, 15, 19 are performed by Brother Soulshine

== Personnel ==
Spearhead

- Michael Franti: vocals, programming, guitars
- Carl Young: bass, keys, flute, sax
- Dave Shul: guitars
- Roberto Quintana: drums, percussion

Additional musicians

- Ramon Lazo: keyboards, Fender Rhodes
- Mary Harris: background vocals
- Zap Mama: vocals on "Listener Supported"
- RadioActive: vocals (track 5)
- Josh Klor: background vocals (track 13)
- Caitlin Cornwall: background vocals (track 13)
- Tanya Saw: vocals (track 20)
- Al Marshal: drums (tracks 1, 5, 7, 11, & 13)
- Troy Lampkins: DJ cuts (tracks 11 & 16)
- Jay Lane: drums (track 16)
- Victor Castro: Trombone
- Gordon Ramos: saxophone
- Bob Crawford: keyboards (track 10)

== Charts ==
Chart performance for Stay Human
Chart (2001)	Peak position
Australian Albums (ARIA)	30
New Zealand Albums (RMNZ)	32

== Certifications ==
Certifications for Stay Human
Region	Certification	Certified units/sales
Australia (ARIA)	Gold	35,000^{^}
^{^} Shipments figures based on certification alone.
