= Friendly Fascism =

Friendly Fascism may refer to:

- Friendly Fascism: The New Face of Power in America, 1980 book by Bertram Gross
- Friendly Fa$cism, an album by Consolidated
- A slogan from Vermin Supreme, a political clown and candidate
