= Ground Kontrol =

Amusement arcade in Portland, Oregon, U.S.

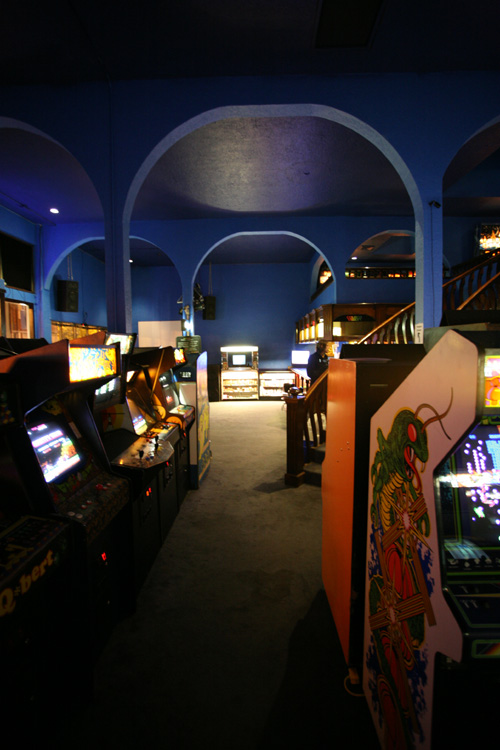
- Ground Kontrol interior, pre-remodel

- Location within Portland, Oregon

Restaurant information
- Established: 1999
- Location: 115 NW 5th Ave, Portland, Oregon, Multnomah, OR, 97209
- Coordinates: 45.523804°N 122.675872°W
- Website: Ground Kontrol website

Ground Kontrol is a video game/pinball and bar in Portland, Oregon, in the United States. It is known for preserving games from the Golden Age of Video Arcade Games. It also serves as a venue for DJs and live music.

== History ==
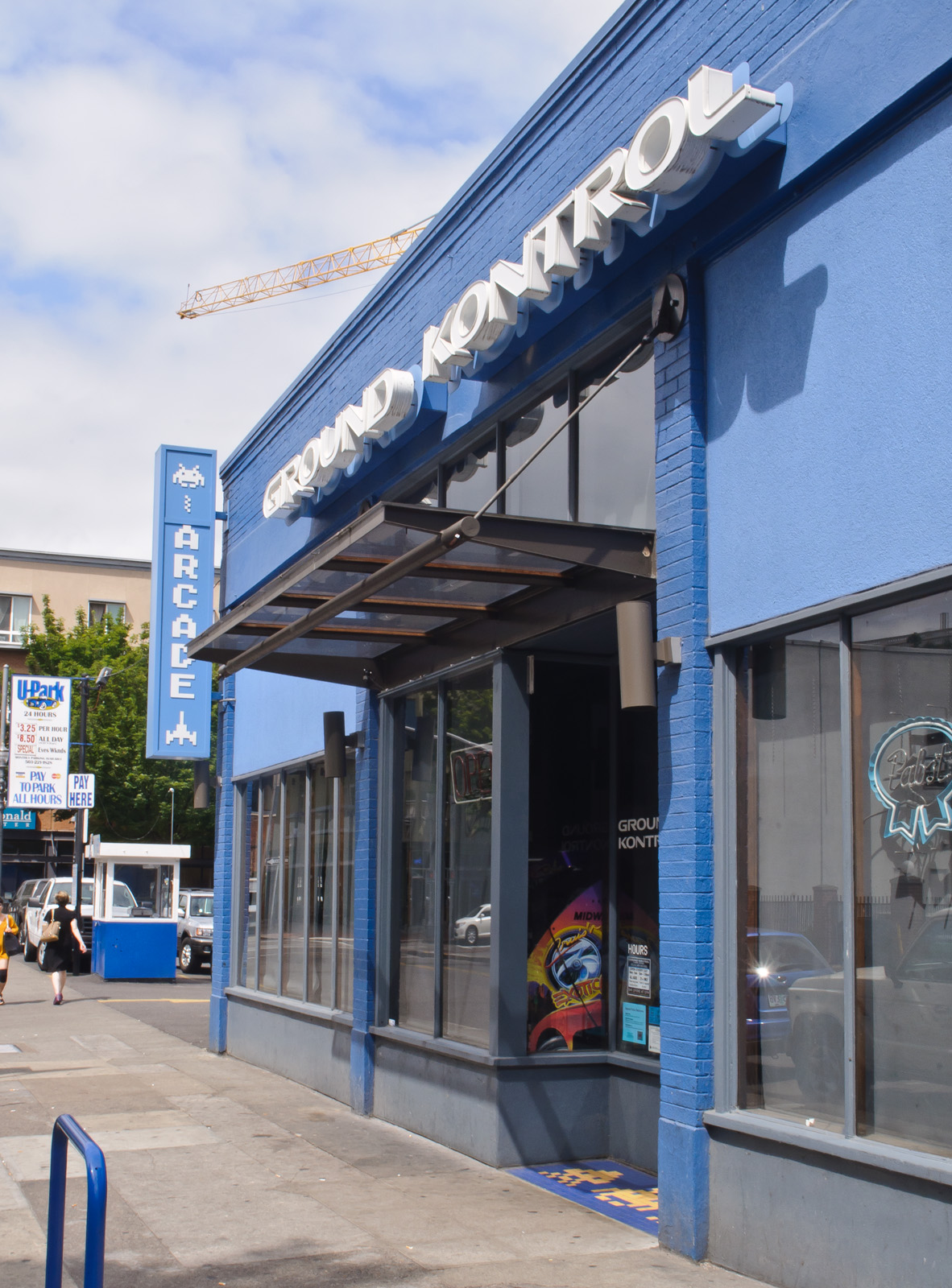
Arcade entrance on NW Couch St.

Since opening in 1999, Ground Kontrol has undergone several changes. The arcade was originally created and opened by Betty Farrier, and Kneel Cohn of the bands Warshow Angels and The Dead Stars on Hollywood. In March 2003, it came under the new ownership of Timewarp Incorporated. In September 2004, Ground Kontrol moved to a new location

In December 2010, Ground Kontrol moved to a temporary location to accommodate a remodel. During renovation, a kitchen and new seating were added, the restrooms were moved, and the decor took on a Tron-esque vibe. On December 11, 2011, Ground Kontrol announced that it was now a full-service bar.

In April 2017, Ground Kontrol expanded into the former location of Backspace, renovating it to include a new bar area, several video screens and a connecting hallway. The newer expanded area was built with a WarGames-esque vibe. A further renovation of the entrance on NW Couch St. was completed in June 2018.

== Events ==
- In June 2004, a world record high score competition was held jointly at Ground Kontrol; Aftershock RetroGames Arcade in Madison, Wisconsin; and the Houston Area Arcade Group Expo in Houston, Texas. Twin Galaxies maintained the results of the competitions for world record consideration.
- Portland Pinbrawl, an annual pinball tournament, is held at Ground Kontrol.
- In 2010, Ground Kontrol was the winner of three arcades competing in Stride gum's "Save the Arcades 2" contest. The owners used the $25,000 prize to assist in funding a full remodeling of the arcade and to buy more games.

== Recognition ==
In July, 2010, Sunset Magazine included Ground Kontrol in the "Best of Portland: Hotels, Dining, and Attractions 2010" publication calling it the "Old Hot Spot" in Portland's Chinatown. The San Francisco Chronicle listed Ground Kontrol as one of "Five places to revisit the '80s". Ground Control won in the "Best Game Bar" category of Willamette Week's "Best of Portland Readers' Poll 2020".

== See also ==
- Culture of Portland, Oregon
- List of companies based in Oregon
