= Yeastie Girlz =

American band

The Yeastie Girlz
- Origin: 924 Gilman Street, Berkeley, California
- Genres: Punk, Slam Poetry
- Years active: 1987-1992, 2004, 2021-present
- Members: Cammie Toloui, Joyce Jimenez, Jane Guskin, and Kate Razo
- Website: yeastiegirlz.com

The Yeastie Girlz are a punk group formed in Berkeley, California. The band consists of Jane Guskin, Joyce Jimenez, Kate (Rosenberger) Rozo, and Cammie Toloui, who are all vocalists and lyricists for the group. They used stage names CamMaster Clit, Joyce Vagina, and Labia Jane during their early performances.

They are known for their distinct style within the punk scene. Their sound is best categorized as a fusion of slam poetry and rap, all a cappella. The group refers to itself as "the very first of the Vaginacore Bands." This unique genre centers around breaking the stigma about taboo issues, usually relating directly to the female body.

The Yeastie Girlz have released one album and numerous singles, and they have been featured and sampled on songs by TV Girl and Consolidated.

== History ==
=== Formation ===
The Yeastie Girlz formed one night in 1987 at Gilman Street, a club known for many punk, hardcore, and heavy metal performances. Cammie recalls that

"Jane and I were talking for a long time about yeast infections, about what we do to get rid of them, and just general yukiness and stuff, and Joyce came along, we put our arms around each another and all of sudden we became the Yeastie Girls."

They credit the environment of Gilman Street for the creation of the band, saying "It's like a giant womb." All the members of the Yeastie Girlz frequented Gilman Street and became fed up with the male-dominated environment. The majority of the bands that played at Gilman were strictly made up of men, and all-female bands were never booked to play with these groups. The Yeastie Girlz recount that even the pit during most shows was so aggressively male that most of the women would be at the back of the club, excluded from the pit.

Fed up with both the environment of Gilman Street and the general environment of the punk rock scene, the Yeastie Girlz took it upon themselves to create the changes they wanted to see.

The final member, Kate Rosenberger, joined the group in March 1988 following the departure of Jane who left the United States for an extended trip to Nicaragua.

=== Performances ===
The first performance of the Yeastie Girlz was at Gilman Street, on July 4, 1987. They performed their first original song "Yeast Power," written primarily by Jane, for the occasion. The group continued to play shows all over the San Francisco Bay Area. They played countless shows in the area before moving abroad.

During one of these performances in Fresno, California during the early days of the group, Cammie invented the "Tampbone." The "Tampbone" is a wind instrument that was created from the cardboard of a tampon applicator and played in a similar way to a slide whistle to create a horn-like sound. The instrument can be heard on the track "Ode An Die Freud" from their album Ovary Action. The instrument became so popular among fans that the Yeastie Girlz uploaded a tutorial, led by Cammie, demonstrating how to make a "Tampbone" on their YouTube page.

From late 1988 to early 1989, the Yeastie Girlz toured Europe with the bands Loveslug and Fugazi. First Joyce and Cammie toured as a duo until Cammie "couldn't possible eat any more patat friet" and returned to San Francisco. Shortly after her return, Kate joined Joyce in Amsterdam to finish the rest of the tour.

Once this European tour was complete, the Yeastie Girlz continued on their separate ways until Consolidated reached out in 1992 about a collaboration. At the time, Cammie and Kate were the only Yeastie Girlz still in the Bay Area, so they enlisted the help of Wendy-O Matik to complete the trio.

=== Lyrical themes ===
The Yeastie Girlz do not shy away from addressing taboo or inappropriate topics. Typically, they focus on feminine issues such as yeast infections, periods, and the inequalities they face in daily life and with sexual partners. Their songs are straight-forward and to the point, rarely featuring any metaphors or other literary devices.

Their most well known song "You Suck," features lyrics such as "Hey, boy you're wasting your tongue with lame excuses and lies. Get your face between my thighs." The song discusses the inequality faced by women who are expected to give but not receive in sexual settings. In these lyrics specifically, they are calling out men for the lame excuses they give when they do not want to perform oral sex, such as stating they have a headache.

While they focus more heavily on feminist ideals, they do discuss broader societal issues within their songs, as well. Their song titled "FCC" directly criticizes the FCC, or Federal Communications Commission, a commission that "regulates interstate and international communications by radio, television, wire, satellite, and cable..." The FCC is responsible for the censorship of swear words and other words deemed offensive to listeners and viewers. In the song, the Yeastie Girlz list the FCC's address and encourage fans to "tell 'em that they're stupid. Yeah, tell 'em that they're destroying our expression 'cause they think it's outrageous. Tell 'em that they're living in the Dark Ages."

=== References in popular culture ===
In 1994, the rock band Aerosmith played "You Suck" by Consolidated ft. The Yeastie Girlz before shows on their Get a Grip Tour to pump up the audience.

On September 1, 1998, Eddie Vedder of Pearl Jam gave a shout-out to the Yeastie Girlz on stage mid-concert. He also rapped the opening verse of "Yeast Power" to a live drum accompaniment from Matt Cameron.

In 2012, rapper Kitty (formerly known as Kitty Pryde) wore a Yeastie Girlz t-shirt in the music video for her song "Okay Cupid." While it is unclear if Kitty Pryde took any creative inspiration from the Yeastie Girlz, a New York Times article about her sudden popularity following the release of "Okay Cupid" describes her style choice as "an outrageous curio, either a savvy wink or just a cheeky joke. Either way, Kitty Pryde is on to something."

In 2013, the Schlesinger Library on the History of Women in America, at Harvard University, added Yeastie Girlz memorabilia to their collection. The submission to the Schlesinger Library included a scrapbook with countless flyers, photographs, letter from record stores and fans, fanzines, drawings, manuscript lyrics, posters, and articles about the group. A t-shirt, phonograph record, and an audiocassette tape were also submitted to the library. This was done in an effort by Cammie Toloui to preserve and digitize all of the Yeastie Girlz's history.

Most recently, the movie Freaky Tales, which premiered at Sundance in 2024 but released nationally in the United States in 2025, includes a t-shirt with the Yeastie Girlz on it. The film takes place in Oakland, California during 1987, making it realistic that the character Tina is seen in a shirt featuring the Yeastie Girlz's logo.

==== Copyright dispute ====
In 2016, the indie band TV Girl released the song "Not Allowed" using numerous samples from the Yeastie Girlz. The track features samples from four of the Yeastie Girlz's songs: "You Suck," "Fuck Yourself," "Sue Your Friends," and "FCC." The title of the song was also taken from song lyrics found in the song "FCC."

The song went viral on TikTok in 2020, causing a massive rise in streaming of the song, the profits of which did not go to the Yeastie Girlz in any way. However, in March 2022, the Yeastie Girlz announced via their Instagram page that they had signed an agreement with TV Girl "to resolve any copyright infringement issues". This agreement resulted in the Yeastie Girlz receiving 50% of all the revenue for "Not Allowed", as well as shared control over the publishing and master rights of the recording.

=== Revival ===
In 2004, the group had a minor and brief revival. Brian Edge released a book titled 924 Gilman, which gave a history of Gilman Street and featured writing from the Yeastie Girlz detailing their fond memories there. In celebration of the book release, Cammie got on stage at the Gilman during the book release party and performed "Yeast Power" as well as a few songs on the "Tampbone."

A major revival of the group started in May 2021, when an official Instagram page was created for the band. It is on this page that they post member updates as well as archival photos, posters, and recordings. Shortly after, the group created a TikTok profile in March 2022, a Bandcamp website in November 2022, and finally an official website in June 2023.

Their use of social media has been used to interact with a new generation of music fans. Their website contains an archive of the Yeastie Girlz's history with recordings, interviews, photos, and accounts of their time at Gilman Street and in Europe.

The Yeastie Girlz were also most recently interviewed in June 2023 for the Woodstein Media Podcast. They were featured in two episodes of the podcast to discuss their legacy "how the songs and ideas have aged, connecting to new fans via social media and old-fashioned postal mail, books, bookshops, bands, and the possibility of new raps."

== Members ==
- Cammie Toloui - vocals, 'Tampbone' (tampon applicator played similar to a slide-whistle)
- Joyce Jimenez - vocals
- Jane Guskin - vocals
- Kate Rosenburger - vocals

=== Cameo appearances ===
- Wendy-O Matik - vocals for "You Suck" by Consolidated ft. The Yeastie Girlz

== Discography ==
=== Albums and EPs ===
Year	Title	Tracks	Other Information
1987	Suck My Smelly Vagina	"Joyce Bo Boyce," "Bitch Twitch/Yeast Power," "Inspecting Vagina May," "Talkin' Shit," "Mary Had A Little Tampon," "Get 'em Off," "Numbing the Tongue with Contraceptives," "Sperm Brain," "Iron Man," "Yeast Power Revisited," "The Acidophilus Connection," "Yeast Power Confessions," and "FCC Rap."	Live Demo Tape
1988	Ovary Action	"FCC," "You Suck," "Sperm Brain," "Talkin' Shit," "Orgasm Addict," "Joyce," "Put A Lid On It," "Fuck Yourself," "Sue Your Friends," and "Ode An Die Freud."	7" Vinyl EP, Produced under Lookout! Records

=== Singles ===
Year	Title
1987	"Yeast Power"
1988	"Sue Your Friends - Live"
1988	"Bitch Twitch/Yeast Power - Live"
1988	"Get Your Hands Off"
1988	"FCC - Live"
1989	"Jingle Balls"
1990	"Oh My Achin' Pussy - Live"
1990	"You Suck - Live"
1990	"Fuck Yourself - Live"

=== Compilation appearances ===
Year	Song title	Album title	Other Information
1987	"Yeast Power"	Turn It Around	Double 7" EP Compilation, Produced by MAXIMUMROCKNROLL
1988	"Get Your Hands Off"	Komotion International Vol. 1	Track was recorded live at one of their shows
2018	"Yeast Power"	Turn It Around: The Story of East Bay Punk	Double LP Compilation, Produced by 1-2-3-4 GO! Records

=== Samples and features ===
Year	Song title	Album title	Artist	Other Information
1989	"Jingle Balls"	We Three Bings (Vital Music's N.Y. Trash X Mas Comp.)	Lily "Braindrops" Burana & The Yeastie Girlz	We Three Bings is a compilation Christmas album. Jason Boer produced, engineered, and created the background beat for the track.
1992	"You Suck"	Play More Music	Consolidated ft. The Yeastie Girlz	Featuring vocals from the Yeastie Girlz (Kate Rosenburger & Cammie Toloui) and honorary Yeastie Girl Wendy-O Matik
2016	"Not Allowed"	Who Really Cares	TV Girl	The Yeastie Girlz were in a copyright dispute with the group after not receiving recognition or monetary compensation for use of their music
