= Play More Music =

Studio album by Consolidated
- Released: September 22, 1992
- Recorded: Razors Edge, May–June 1992
- Genre: Industrial, big beat
- Length: 71:43
- Label: Nettwerk

Consolidated chronology
Friendly Fa$cism (1991)	Play More Music (1992)	Warning: Explicit Lyrics (1993)

Professional ratings
Review scores
Source	Rating
AllMusic	3/5 stars

Play More Music is the third full-length album by American electronic music group Consolidated, released in 1992.

During its concerts, the band placed microphones in the crowd, so that audience members could interact with the band between songs. The short tracks on this disc are comments by audience members or interaction between the band and the audience. The Crack Emcee's title on "Crackhouse" is misspelled as "Crack MC"

== Track listings ==
=== CD ===
1. "Industrial Music Is Fascism" – 0:37
2. "Tool and Die" – 5:44
3. "CNN" – 0:08
4. "Praxis" (Bold as Love) – 4:33
5. "We Came Here for Music" – 0:11
6. "Accept Me for What I Am" – 5:09
7. "Veggie Beat Manifesto" – 2:45
8. "Why I'm in the Klan" – 0:40
9. "Guerrillas in the Mist" featuring Paris– 4:24
10. "Hello Are You There" – 0:59
11. "Infomodities 92" – 5:58
12. "Animal Rights / Abortion Rights" – 0:53
13. "Wendy O Matik" featuring Wendy-O Matik – 1:28
14. "One More Song" – 0:26
15. "He" – 5:08
16. "I Reckon You Should Shut the Fuck Up and Play Some Music" – 0:25
17. "You Suck" featuring The Yeastie Girlz – 4:11
18. "The Men's Movement" – 6:25
19. "Gone Fishing" – 5:27
20. "Labor Vs Leisure" – 0:41
21. "A Day on the Green" – 6:02
22. "More Music" – 0:04
23. "Hip O Crits" – 0:27
24. "Industry Corporate" – 3:00
25. "This Isn't a Fuckin Press Conference" – 0:28
26. "Crackhouse" featuring Crack MC – 5:16
27. "More Music Please" – 0:14

=== Vinyl ===
Side one

1. "Industrial Music Is Fascism" – 0:37
2. "Tool and Die" – 5:44
3. "CNN" – 0:08
4. "Praxis" (Bold as Love) – 4:33
5. "We Came Here for Music" – 0:11
6. "Accept Me for What I Am" – 5:09
7. "Why I'm in the Klan" – 0:40
8. "Guerrillas in the Mist" featuring Paris – 4:24
9. "Hello Are You There" – 0:59
10. "Infomodities 92" – 5:58
11. "Animal Rights / Abortion Rights" – 0:53

Side two

1. "One More Song" – 0:26
2. "He" – 5:08
3. "I Reckon You Should Shut the Fuck Up and Play Some Music" – 0:25
4. "You Suck" – 4:11
5. "Labor Vs Leisure" – 0:41
6. "A Day on the Green" – 6:02
7. "More Music/Hip O Crits" – 0:31
8. "Industry Corporate" – 3:00
9. "This Isn't a Fuckin Press Conference" – 0:28
10. "Crackhouse" featuring Crack MC – 5:16
11. "More Music Please" – 0:14
