= Dropped (Consolidated album) =

Studio album by Consolidated
- Released: January 20, 1998
- Genre: Industrial; hip hop
- Length: 66:06
- Label: G7 Welcoming Committee
- Producer: Adam Sherburne with Mark Pistel

Consolidated chronology
| Business of Punishment (1994) | Dropped (1998) | The End of Meaning (2000) |

Professional ratings
Review scores
| Source | Rating |
|---|---|
| Allmusic | 2.5/5 stars |

Dropped is the fifth full-length album by industrial/hip hop artists Consolidated, which was released in 1998 by G7 Welcoming Committee. The title is an allusion to the band having been "dropped" by London Records because of poor album sales as well as a general reference to men having "dropped the ball" in their relationships.

According to Chris Hannah, one of the founding members of the G7 Welcoming Committee record label, Adam Sherburne contacted the fledgling label after seeing an ad in the pages of Z Magazine and requested that they release the album.

== Track listing ==
All tracks are written by Sherburne.

| No. | Title | Length |
|---|---|---|
| 1. | "Shell" | 5:15 |
| 2. | "Lesbian Avengers" | 0:48 |
| 3. | "Schnitzel Boy" | 4:23 |
| 4. | "Fractured Fairytales" | 3:59 |
| 5. | "One Way Out" | 4:35 |
| 6. | "Coming of Rage (Fight or Flight)" | 5:07 |
| 7. | "Red Flags and Bags" | 6:02 |
| 8. | "I'm Sorry Mat" | 5:01 |
| 9. | "Tin Man" | 5:20 |
| 10. | "Recovered Memory (The Perp, Pt. 1)" | 5:07 |
| 11. | "G.L.O.R.I.A." | 2:18 |
| 12. | "Craig" | 2:55 |
| 13. | "Why Doesn't He Stop (The Perp, Pt. 2 )" | 3:54 |
| 14. | "Headgear" | 5:12 |
| 15. | "Pimp Is the World's Oldest Profession" | 0:35 |
| 16. | "The Window (For Andrea and John" | 5:33 |
| Total length: | | 66:06 |
