= United States Senate Committee on Small Business and Entrepreneurship =

Standing committee of the United States Senate

Senate Small Business Committee
Standing committee
- Active United States Senate; 119th Congress

History
- Formed: February 20, 1950

Leadership
- Chair: Joni Ernst (R); Since January 3, 2025
- Ranking Member: Ed Markey (D); Since January 3, 2025

Structure
- Seats: 19 members
- Political parties: Majority (10): Republican (10); Minority (9): Democratic (9)

Jurisdiction
- Oversight authority: Small Business Administration
- House counterpart: House Committee on Small Business

Website
- www.sbc.senate.gov

The U.S. Senate Committee on Small Business and Entrepreneurship is a standing committee of the United States Senate. It has jurisdiction over the Small Business Administration and is also charged with researching and investigating all problems of American small business enterprises.

== History ==
=== Special Committee to Study Problems of American Small Business ===
On October 8, 1940, the Senate established the Special Committee to Study and Survey Problems of Small Business Enterprises (also known as the Special Committee to Study Problems of American Small Business).

The committee was chaired by James E. Murray (Montana. The other members of the special committee were:

- Francis T. Maloney, Connecticut
- Arthur Capper, Kansas
- James M. Mead, New York
- Tom Stewart, Tennessee
- Claude Pepper, Florida (Chair of the Subcommittee on Research and Education)
- James G. Scrugham, Nevada
- Robert A. Taft, Ohio
- George A. Wilson, Iowa
- Kenneth S. Wherry, Nebraska
- C. Douglass Buck, Delaware

Bertram Myron Gross was the Chief of Research and Hearings. With funding from the Carnegie Foundation of New York, he took responsibility for producing The Fate of Small Business in Nazi Germany, written by A. R. L. Gurland, Otto Kirchheimer and Franz Neumann.

On January 31, 1949, this special committee was terminated.

=== Select Committee on Small Business ===
On February 20, 1950, the Select Committee on Small Business was created with approval of Senate Resolution 58 during the 81st Congress. That first committee had just nine members. It was the first select committee created by the Senate that still operates today.

The select committee was terminated on March 25, 1981, when it became the Committee on Small Business, a standing committee. On June 29, 2001, Sen. John F. Kerry (D-Mass.) changed the name of the committee to the Committee on Small Business and Entrepreneurship.

The committee's jurisdiction has been changed several times since it was first created, through additional powers or by changing the manner in which committee members are appointed. While first established as a select committee with limited responsibilities, it now possesses virtually all the characteristics of a standing committee, as outlined under Senate Rule 25.

During the 96th Congress, the committee acted on legislation to reauthorize the Small Business Administration that expanded the agency to include loan programs for employee ownership, Small Business Development Centers, and increased export development assistance for small businesses.

Since its creation, the committee has held hearings on paperwork reduction and elimination (which eventually led to the Paperwork Reduction Act), capital formation, tax and securities law reform for small business, steel plant shutdowns, and the impact of inflation on governmental actions on the housing industry.

== Jurisdiction ==
Initially, the Small Business Committee only had limited oversight over the Small Business Administration. The committee was directed to report to the Senate from time to time with its recommendations regarding small business matters.

With the adoption of S. Res. 272 during the 82nd Congress, the committee was granted subpoena power, and the ability to "sit and act at such times during the sessions, recesses, and adjourned periods of the Senate." These abilities are common to the other standing committees in the Senate. S. Res. 272 also provided for a more structured committee, with specific requirements on a quorum of members needed for the committee to conduct its business, and its own committee staff.

S. Res. 58 stipulated that beginning with the 95th Congress, the Small Business Committee would be granted jurisdiction over all legislation relating to the Small Business Administration. This ability was granted S. Res. 104, agreed to on April 29, 1976, provided for this new jurisdiction, granting not only authority over small business legislation but additional oversight over the agency as well. The committee has also been granted the right of re-referral of legislation from other standing committees, where appropriate.

Today, the jurisdiction of the committee is roughly the same as it was when it was first established, chiefly the Small Business Administration and the Small Investment Act. However, by tradition, the committee reviews all matters that apply to small business that are not by themselves subject to the jurisdiction over another standing committee. The committee continues to study and survey by means of research and investigation all problems of American small business enterprises, with the intent to provide advice to Congress in enacting appropriate legislation. The committee also is responsible for reviewing nominations for positions within the Small Business Administration, including its Administrator, Chief Council for Advocacy, and Inspector General.

== Members, 119th Congress ==
| Majority | Minority |
|---|---|
| Joni Ernst, Iowa, Chair; Jim Risch, Idaho; Rand Paul, Kentucky; Tim Scott, South Carolina; Todd Young, Indiana; Josh Hawley, Missouri; Ted Budd, North Carolina; John Curtis, Utah; Jim Justice, West Virginia (from January 14, 2025); Jon Husted, Ohio (from January 24, 2025) | Ed Markey, Massachusetts, Ranking Member; Maria Cantwell, Washington; Jeanne Shaheen, New Hampshire; Cory Booker, New Jersey; Chris Coons, Delaware; Mazie Hirono, Hawaii; Jacky Rosen, Nevada; John Hickenlooper, Colorado; Adam Schiff, California |

== Chairs ==
=== Select Committee on Small Business ===
| Name | Party | State | Start | End |
|---|---|---|---|---|
| John Sparkman | Democratic | Alabama | 1950 | 1953 |
| Edward Thye | Republican | Minnesota | 1953 | 1955 |
| John Sparkman | Democratic | Alabama | 1955 | 1967 |
| George Smathers | Democratic | Florida | 1967 | 1969 |
| Alan Bible | Democratic | Nevada | 1969 | 1974 |
| Gaylord Nelson | Democratic | Wisconsin | 1974 | 1981 |

=== Committee on Small Business and Entrepreneurship ===
| Name | Party | State | Start | End |
|---|---|---|---|---|
| Lowell Weicker | Republican | Connecticut | 1981 | 1987 |
| Dale Bumpers | Democratic | Arkansas | 1987 | 1995 |
| Kit Bond | Republican | Missouri | 1995 | 2001 |
| John Kerry | Democratic | Massachusetts | 2001 | |
| Kit Bond | Republican | Missouri | 2001 | |
| John Kerry | Democratic | Massachusetts | 2001 | 2003 |
| Olympia Snowe | Republican | Maine | 2003 | 2007 |
| John Kerry | Democratic | Massachusetts | 2007 | 2009 |
| Mary Landrieu | Democratic | Louisiana | 2009 | 2014 |
| Maria Cantwell | Democratic | Washington | 2014 | 2015 |
| David Vitter | Republican | Louisiana | 2015 | 2017 |
| Jim Risch | Republican | Idaho | 2017 | 2019 |
| Marco Rubio | Republican | Florida | 2019 | 2021 |
| Ben Cardin | Democratic | Maryland | 2021 | 2023 |
| Jeanne Shaheen | Democratic | New Hampshire | 2023 | 2025 |
| Joni Ernst | Republican | Iowa | 2025 | present |

== Ranking members ==
| Name | Party | State | Start | End |
|---|---|---|---|---|
| John Sparkman | Democratic | Alabama | 1953 | 1955 |
| Edward Thye | Republican | Minnesota | 1955 | 1959 |
| Leverett Saltonstall | Republican | Massachusetts | 1959 | 1967 |
| Jacob Javits | Republican | New York | 1967 | 1977 |
| Lowell Weicker | Republican | Connecticut | 1977 | 1981 |
| Sam Nunn | Democratic | Georgia | 1981 | 1983 |
| Dale Bumpers | Democratic | Arkansas | 1983 | 1987 |
| Lowell Weicker | Republican | Connecticut | 1987 | 1989 |
| Rudy Boschwitz | Republican | Minnesota | 1989 | 1991 |
| Bob Kasten | Republican | Wisconsin | 1991 | 1993 |
| Larry Pressler | Republican | South Dakota | 1993 | 1995 |
| Dale Bumpers | Democratic | Arkansas | 1995 | 1997 |
| John Kerry | Democratic | Massachusetts | 1997 | 2001 |
| Kit Bond | Republican | Missouri | 2001 | 2003 |
| John Kerry | Democratic | Massachusetts | 2003 | 2007 |
| Olympia Snowe | Republican | Maine | 2007 | 2013 |
| Jim Risch | Republican | Idaho | 2013 | 2015 |
| Ben Cardin | Democratic | Maryland | 2015 | |
| Jeanne Shaheen | Democratic | New Hampshire | 2015 | 2018 |
| Ben Cardin | Democratic | Maryland | 2018 | 2021 |
| Rand Paul | Republican | Kentucky | 2021 | 2023 |
| Joni Ernst | Republican | Iowa | 2023 | 2025 |
| Ed Markey | Democratic | Massachusetts | 2025 | present |

== Historical committee rosters ==
=== 118th Congress ===
| Majority | Minority |
|---|---|
| Jeanne Shaheen, New Hampshire, Chair (from September 27, 2023); Ben Cardin, Maryland, Chair (until September 27, 2023); Maria Cantwell, Washington; Ed Markey, Massachusetts; Cory Booker, New Jersey; Chris Coons, Delaware; Mazie Hirono, Hawaii; Tammy Duckworth, Illinois; Jacky Rosen, Nevada; John Hickenlooper, Colorado | Joni Ernst, Iowa, Ranking Member; Marco Rubio, Florida; Jim Risch, Idaho; Rand Paul, Kentucky; Tim Scott, South Carolina; Todd Young, Indiana; John Kennedy, Louisiana; Josh Hawley, Missouri; Ted Budd, North Carolina |

=== 117th Congress ===
| Majority | Minority |
|---|---|
| Ben Cardin, Maryland, Chair; Maria Cantwell, Washington; Jeanne Shaheen, New Hampshire; Ed Markey, Massachusetts; Cory Booker, New Jersey; Chris Coons, Delaware; Mazie Hirono, Hawaii; Tammy Duckworth, Illinois; Jacky Rosen, Nevada; John Hickenlooper, Colorado | Rand Paul, Kentucky, Ranking Member; Marco Rubio, Florida; Jim Risch, Idaho; Tim Scott, South Carolina; Joni Ernst, Iowa; Jim Inhofe, Oklahoma; Todd Young, Indiana; John Kennedy, Louisiana; Josh Hawley, Missouri; Roger Marshall, Kansas |

=== 116th Congress ===
| Majority | Minority |
|---|---|
| Marco Rubio, Florida, Chair; Jim Risch, Idaho; Rand Paul, Kentucky; Tim Scott, South Carolina; Joni Ernst, Iowa; Jim Inhofe, Oklahoma; Todd Young, Indiana; John Kennedy, Louisiana; Mitt Romney, Utah; Josh Hawley, Missouri | Ben Cardin, Maryland, Ranking Member; Jeanne Shaheen, New Hampshire; Maria Cantwell, Washington; Ed Markey, Massachusetts; Cory Booker, New Jersey; Chris Coons, Delaware; Mazie Hirono, Hawaii; Tammy Duckworth, Illinois; Jacky Rosen, Nevada |

=== 115th Congress ===
| Majority | Minority |
|---|---|
| Jim Risch, Idaho, Chair; Marco Rubio, Florida; Rand Paul, Kentucky; Tim Scott, South Carolina; Joni Ernst, Iowa; Jim Inhofe, Oklahoma; Todd Young, Indiana; Mike Enzi, Wyoming; Mike Rounds, South Dakota; John Kennedy, Louisiana | Ben Cardin, Maryland, Ranking Member; Jeanne Shaheen, New Hampshire; Maria Cantwell, Washington; Heidi Heitkamp, North Dakota; Ed Markey, Massachusetts; Cory Booker, New Jersey; Chris Coons, Delaware; Mazie Hirono, Hawaii; Tammy Duckworth, Illinois |

== See also ==
- List of United States Senate committees
- U.S. House Committee on Small Business
