= Warshow Angels =

American rock band

- Origin: New York City, New York, United States
- Genres: Post-punk, glam rock, alternative rock, gothic rock
- Years active: 2013–present
- Members: Kneel Cohn; Todd Bryerton
- Website: warshowangels.com

Warshow Angels are an American rock band from New York City formed in 2013 by singer-guitarist Kneel Cohn. The band combines elements of post-punk, gothic rock and glam rock genres and has been compared to and influenced by The Lords of the New Church, Love and Rockets and Sigue Sigue Sputnik.

== Biography ==
Warshow Angels was formed by singer-guitarist Kneel Cohn in 2013 after the dissolution of The Dead Stars On Hollywood with drummer Todd Bryerton, formerly of electro-industrial activist group Consolidated.

The band's self-titled debut album is known for its many guest appearances by musicians from established post-punk, glam rock, psych-rock and electro/industrial bands. Notable credited artists include guitarist Peter Holmström of The Dandy Warhols and Pete International Airport, bassist Sami Yaffa of Hanoi Rocks, Michael Monroe's bands and New York Dolls, Tony Barber, former bassist of Buzzcocks, guitarist Nicky Garratt from U.K. Subs and Nik Turner's Hawkwind, Martin Shellard, former bassist of Spiritualized and Julian Beeston from Nitzer Ebb.

The songs Love Hz and Bang Bang Love appear on Home On The Range, a farm animal benefit album presented by CFEI, a 501c3 non-profit animal rights organization. The album includes original songs by Moby, Joan Jett, The Pretenders, Yoko Ono, Bright Eyes, Nellie McKay, and Howard Jones.

== Discography ==
=== Studio albums ===
- Warshow Angels (2014)

=== Compilation albums ===
- Home On The Range (2016)

== Other sources ==
- C, Laurent (music editor). Warshow Angels S/T. Veglam, July, 2014.
- Ellis-Ritter, Karen (director) "Home On The Range Benefit" CFEI, March, 2016
