= The End of Meaning =

Studio album by Consolidated
- Released: 2000
- Genre: Industrial, Hip hop
- Length: 72:03
- Label: Consolidated Artists

Consolidated chronology
Dropped (1998)	The End of Meaning (2000)

The End of Meaning is the sixth full-length album by industrial/hip hop artists Consolidated, which was released in 2000.

Peace News called it a "great album, keeping political music alive and kicking".

== Track listing ==
1. "Momentary Illusion of Autonomy" – 0:36
2. "I Don't Live Today" – 4:52
3. "Tragedat at Neah Bay" – 5:52
4. "Procession for the Endless (Reprocessing)" – 2:32
5. "Just for the Sake of Fashion" – 3:36
6. "You Go Dude" – 3:11
7. "What Does It Mean?" – 0:51
8. "Freedom Now, Sweet!" – 3:43
9. "Get in Touch With Your Inner Loser" – 2:41
10. "Men Will Never Legislate a Pregnant Woman's Experience" – 2:56
11. "Fall Out of Culture Industry" – 5:34
12. "How Many Woodstock Brokers and Broke Stalkers Would" – 2:36
13. "Guns and Boys Who Kill" – 2:42
14. "This Dance Together Is Love of So Many Lifetimes" – 0:51
15. "Controlled from Outer Space" – 3:04
16. "Speech and Harm" – 5:55
17. "When Asked About Being Turned Out at 12, She Said, '..." – 3:10
18. "Race of Questions" – 0:58
19. "The Technological Rationale Is the Rationale of Domination Itself" – 4:15
20. "Shame, Shame, Shame" – 2:38
21. "You Make Me Feel" – 3:16
22. "My Conversation With Kevin" – 0:51
23. "I Remember You from Tennis Camp" – 3:44
24. "It's All About Money of Course" – 1:39
