= Backspace (Portland, Oregon) =

Former coffee shop and music venue

- Logo

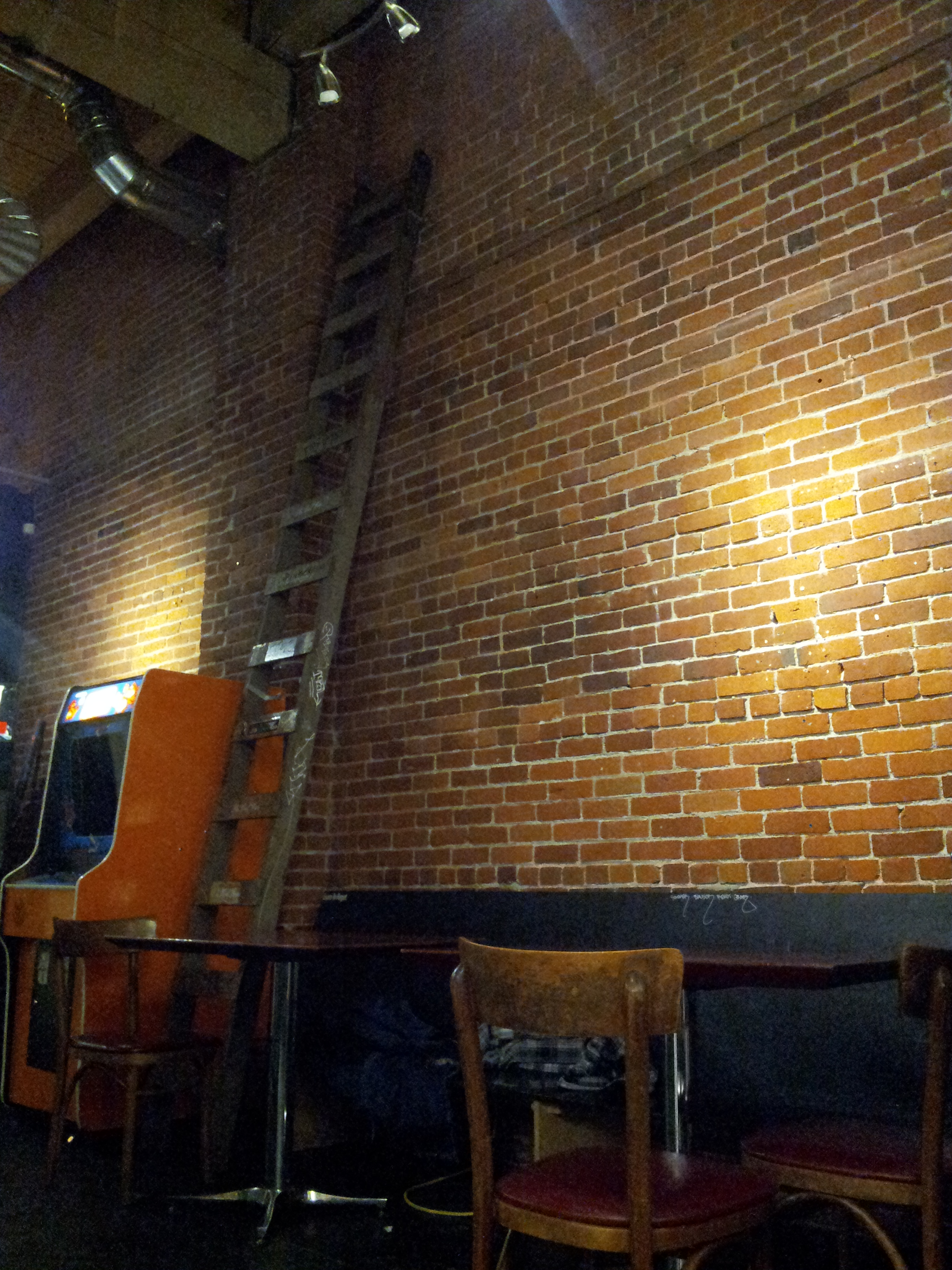
- Exposed brick wall, Backspace interior, 2013
- Interactive map of Backspace
- Address: 115 Northwest 5th Avenue
- Location: Portland, Oregon, United States
- Coordinates: 45.52408°N 122.67575°W
- Owner: Eric Robison

Construction
- Opened: July 2003
- Closed: 2013

Backspace (sometimes Backspace Cafe) was a coffee shop, gallery, Internet café, and all-ages music venue located in the Old Town Chinatown neighborhood of Portland, Oregon, in the United States. The venue opened in mid 2003 and closed in 2013.

== Description and history ==
Owner and painter Eric Robison opened Backspace, which was located at 115 Northwest 5th Avenue in Portland's Old Town Chinatown neighborhood, as a coffee shop in July 2003. He was inspired by two nearby stores within the same neighborhood, operated by Katsu Tanaka: Compound, a gallery, and Just Be Toys, a Japanese-themed toy and DVD rental store. Robison and his brother Kris had considered operating the business in the Pearl District, but were "attracted to the edginess" of the building. He recalled, "People said, 'Dude, you're insane,' when I told them where it was. I saw the exposed brick, and the whole cyberpunk feel that we could pursue. It was a little too frou-frou in the Pearl." Robison also recalled fending off drug activity outside the store by barring dealers and users from entry. The building that housed Backspace was renovated by the city and Portland Development Commission.

The establishment had been described as a gallery, a computer gaming and Internet café, and an "oft-beleaguered" all-ages music venue. It was one of several businesses in the neighborhood, including Ground Kontrol, geared towards young people who worked in the technology industry. According to Willamette Week's Matthew Singer, Backspace "[evolved] into the epicenter of Portland's underage music culture" because of a one-off Thermals performance in 2007. The space hosted a variety of events, including Portland Development Commission meetings (2007), an anti-bullying event called "Frank Conversations: Speaking Out on Bullying" (2010), and a concert by Dustin Ruth, the Battle Ground, Washington-based singer-songwriter and frontman of the band Ruth (2011).

=== Closure ===
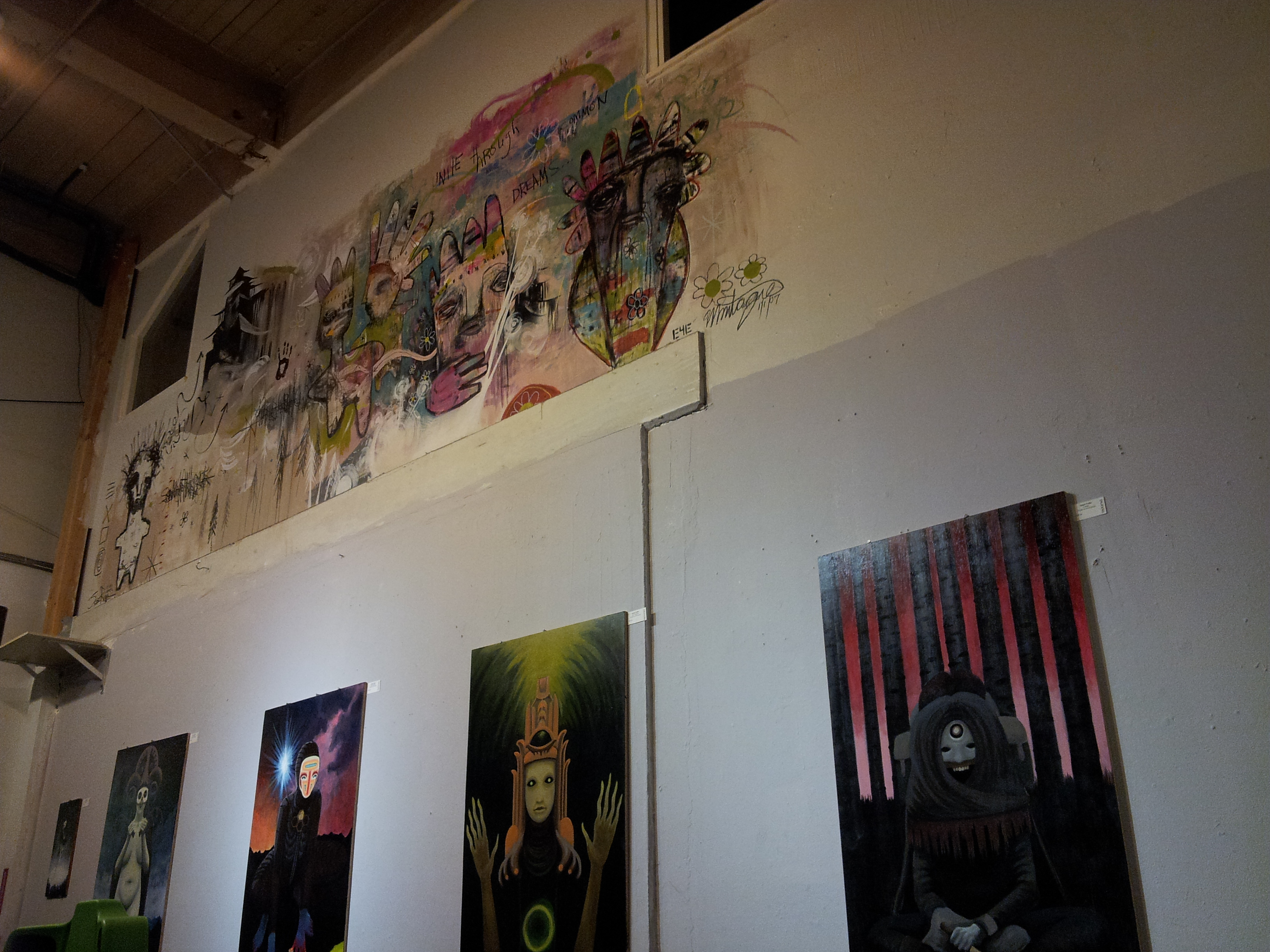
Interior art display, 2013

Beginning in the late 2000s, Backspace had a string of financial difficulties. The business almost closed in 2008, but was able to continue operating after the Oregon Liquor Control Commission permitted Backspace to serve beer and wine while hosting all-ages events and performances. In 2012, Robison began raising funds to help eliminate $10,000 in "delinquent late fees for past-due rent and licensing" from the American Society of Composers, Authors and Publishers (ASCAP) and Broadcast Music, Inc. (BMI). Robison decided to relocate when the city pass an ordinance requiring nightclubs in older buildings to install sprinkler systems. One of the property investors said the building's owners elected not to renew the cafe's lease because "music [was] not compatible with rest of tenants in the building".

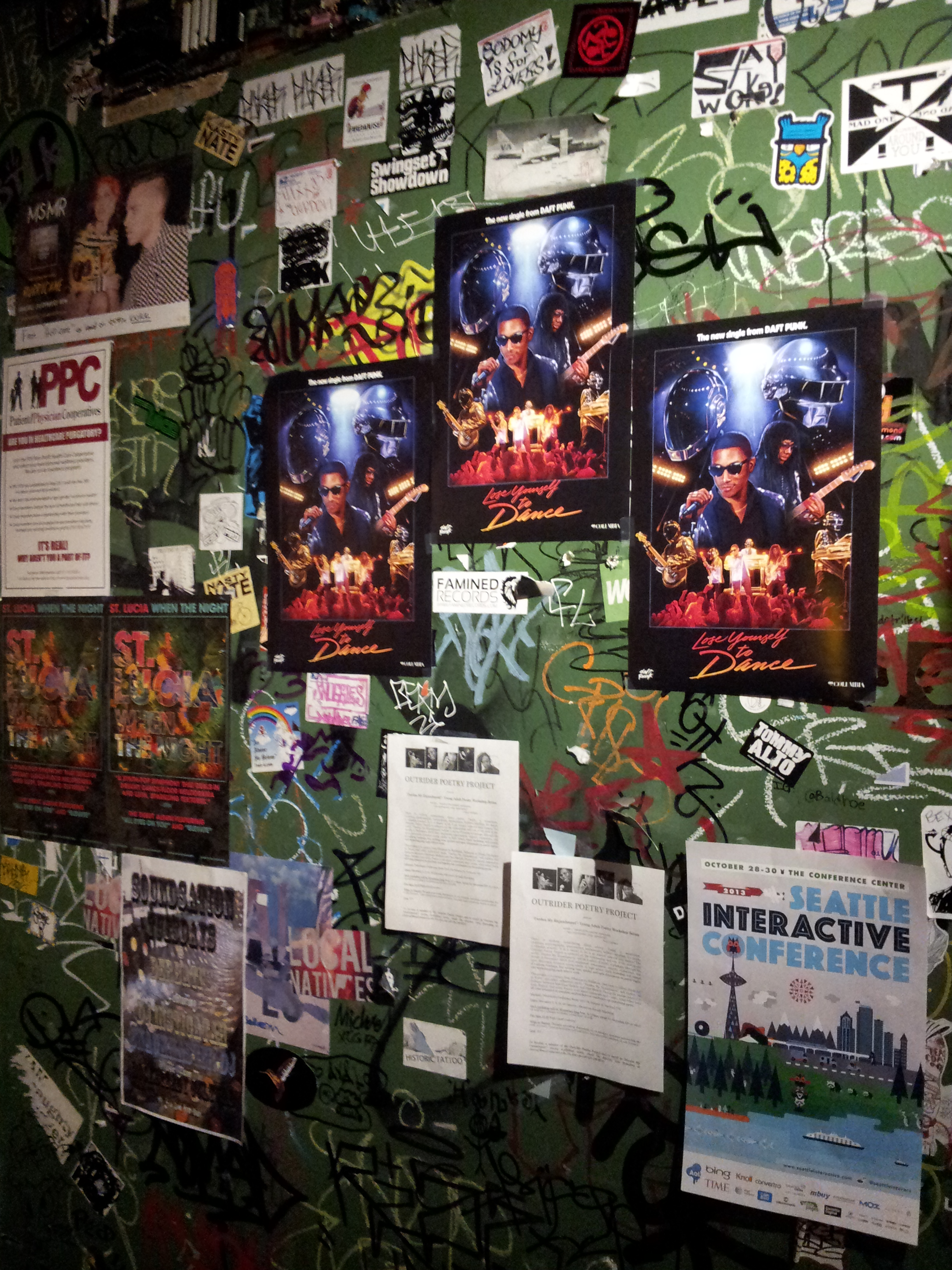
Interior wall, 2013

In September 2013, Robison confirmed that he wanted to relocate the business to a larger space before its lease expired in November. He originally planned to move Backspace to a building along Northeast Martin Luther King Jr. Boulevard. When plans fell through, he considered relocating to a different location in northeast Portland. However, this plan meant Backspace would not be able to reopen until the spring season of 2014 because of ongoing renovation efforts. In October, Robison said Backspace would stop hosting live performances after its Halloween celebration and would remain open temporarily as a coffee shop. He told Willamette Week: "The one thing we want to do is build it right. Backspace was all patchwork and chewing gum. We want to build something that will last." Robison hoped to host one final concert in Backspace's original location on New Year's Eve, 2013, featuring a "big-name local act, pending landlord approval".

In his 2014 article "RIP: 11 Shuttered PDX Bars and Restaurants We'll Miss", Thrillist contributor Drew Tyson wrote, "We'll miss dancing in this boisterous bar/gallery that was decked out like a geeky Internet cafe with a photo booth, pinball machines, a treehouse, and... wait! It was a geeky Internet cafe that whole time?!"

After sitting vacant for over a year, the location was remodeled to accommodate an expansion of the Ground Kontrol video game and pinball arcade and bar located in the same building.

== See also ==
- Coffee in Portland, Oregon
- Culture of Portland, Oregon
