= Adam Sherburne =

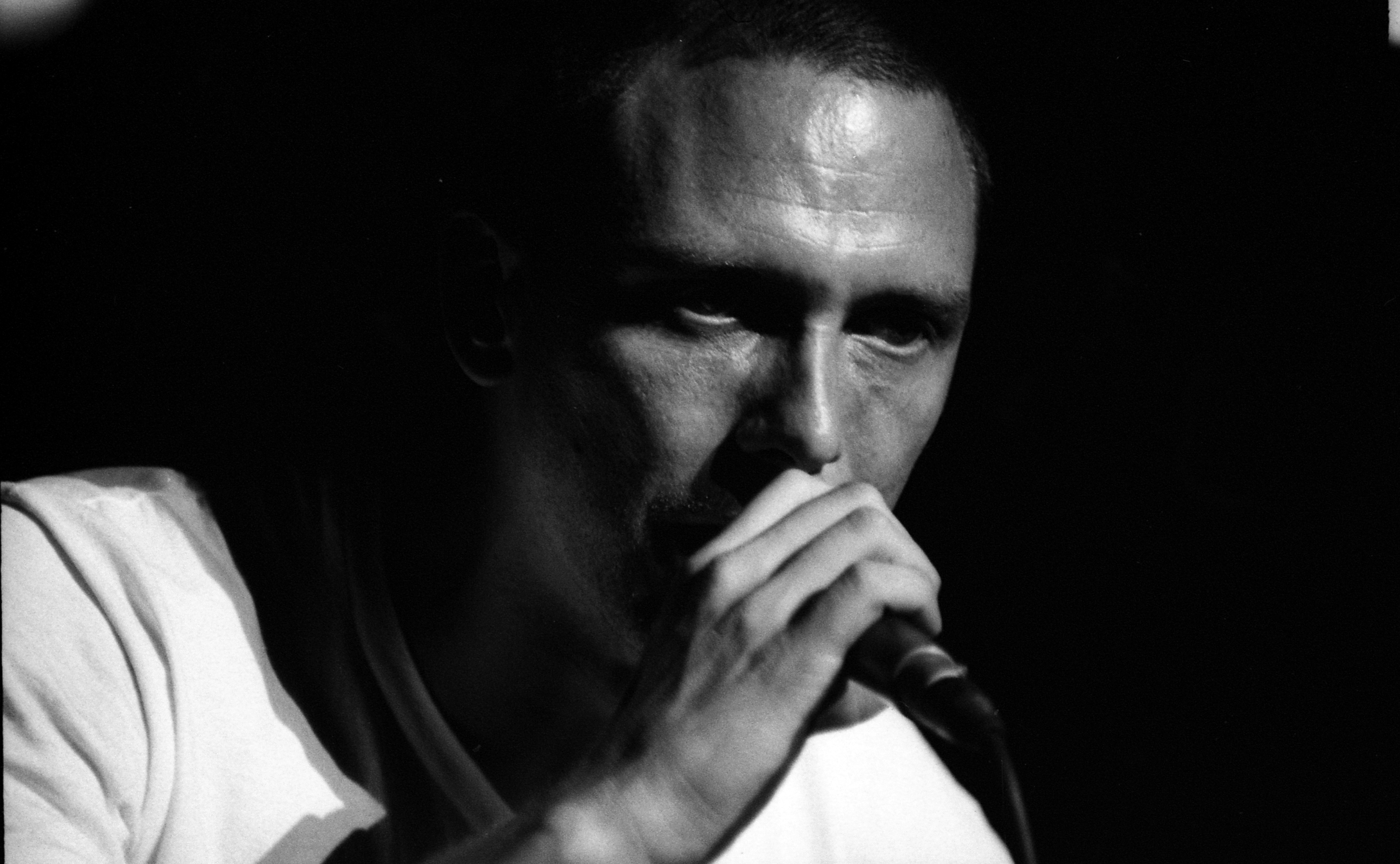
- Singing with Consolidated in 1993

Background information
- Occupation: Musician
- Instrument: Guitar
- Years active: 1987?–present

Adam Sherburne is the former lead guitarist, vocalist, and music director for Consolidated, a techno-industrial band from San Francisco, California. The band's music covered many hot political topics, including vegetarianism, women's rights, animal rights, the unity of oppression, World War II and The Holocaust, the dangers of capitalism, white supremacy, and the evils of blind nationalism. Consolidated was active from the late 1980s to the mid-1990s.

== Live performances ==
Consolidated were notable for including in each of their live performances a period of time in which microphones were passed among audience members, who could then discuss, rebut, argue or elaborate upon the topics of Consolidated's songs. Consolidated devised these interactions as a way to subvert the typically passive experience of watching a band perform, empowering the audience members to respond and articulate their own opinions on issues addressed in the song lyrics or even the nature of the performance itself. Consolidated recorded many of these interactions and sampled excerpts of them to be included on their albums. In some cases, these samples were arranged and featured as short interludes between songs, while in other cases they were worked into the sonic collages of the songs themselves (e.g., "Crusading Rap Guys" on the 1991 LP Friendly Fa$cism.)

Consolidated's live performances featured video montages that were either projected onto large screens, or featured on multiple television sets positioned along the perimeter of the stage. The video footage included their promotional music video clips for their singles, as well as video art composed of found footage which corresponded to the lyrical topics of specific songs (e.g., myths of male sexuality, sexist depictions of women in mass media, and the inhumane treatment of animals in laboratories and slaughterhouses).

Local, regional and national activist groups were invited by Consolidated to set up tables and information kiosks at their shows while they were on tour.

Prior to Consolidated, he was a member of the band Until December.

His current project is Free Music! Stop America!, an open group of musicians and artists based in Portland, Oregon, dedicated to the free exchange of musical ideas, and to hastening the end of the music industry.

Between 2006-2022 he taught music to homeless youth for the Artist Mentorship Program in Portland, Oregon.

In spring 2011, a fictitious album -"2012: The end of times, the end of bands", by a fictitious band- HA! HA! ASS CLOWN! was freely distributed on the internet.

Since Oct. 6 2011, Sherburne has participated in Occupy Portland as a 'free' music organizer for marches, rallies, and revolutionary music workshops, as well as highlighting music's role in life and social movements.
