= Friendly Fa$cism =

Studio album by Consolidated
- Released: 1991
- Recorded: November 1990 - January 1991
- Studio: Razors Edge
- Genre: Industrial hip hop
- Length: 64:26
- Label: Nettwerk
- Producer: Consolidated

Consolidated chronology
The Myth of Rock (1990)	Friendly Fa$cism (1991)	Play More Music (1992)

Friendly Fa$cism is a full-length album by industrial/hip hop artists Consolidated, released in 1991.

"Brutal Equation" and "Unity of Oppression" were alternative rock hits on MTV. The album peaked at No. 6 on the CMJ Radio Top 150.

The name comes from Friendly Fascism: The New Face of Power in America, the title of a 1980 book by political scientist Bertram Gross which lays out the form of "creeping fascism" that Gross feared might come to pass in the United States.

== Critical reception ==
Professional ratings
Review scores
Source	Rating
AllMusic	3/5 stars
Robert Christgau	B−

Trouser Press wrote that "the insufferably self-righteous tone makes the disc hard to endure." Alternative Rock called the album "a hard-hitting soundtrack of hip-hop, funk, soul, and hard rock.

== Track listing (CD) ==
1. "Zero" – 0:21
2. "Brutal Equation" – 4:13
3. "Our Leader" – 1:01
4. "Unity of Oppression" – 4:01
5. "The Sexual Politics of Meat" – 3:43
6. "Typical Male" – 5:18
7. "Entertainment Tonight" – 0:40
8. "Dominion" – 4:04
9. "Friendly Fascism" – 5:01
10. "College Radio" – 1:27
11. "We Gotta Have Peace" – 3:30
12. "Meat Kills" – 3:34
13. "Stoned" – 6:54
14. "Your Body Belongs to the State" – 1:49
15. "Crusading Rap Guys" – 5:29
16. "Murder One" – 2:52
17. "White American Male '91 (The Truth Hurts) Part 2" – 5:12
18. "Music Has No Meaning" – 5:17

== Track listing (Vinyl) ==
Side one

1. "Zero" – 0:21
2. "Brutal Equation" – 4:13
3. "Our Leader" – 1:01
4. "Unity of Oppression" – 4:01
5. "The Sexual Politics of Meat" – 3:43
6. "Typical Male" – 5:18
7. "Entertainment Tonight" – 0:40
8. "Friendly Fascism" – 5:01

Side two

1. "We Gotta Have Peace" – 3:30
2. "Meat Kills" – 3:34
3. "Stoned" – 6:54
4. "White American Male '91 (The Truth Hurts) Part 2" – 5:12
5. "Music Has No Meaning" – 5:17
