= The Myth of Rock =

Studio album by Consolidated
- Released: 1990
- Studio: Russian Hill
- Genre: Hip hop
- Length: 52:55
- Label: Nettwerk
- Producer: Michael Ahearn

Consolidated chronology
Consolidated! (1989)	The Myth of Rock (1990)	Friendly Fa$cism (1991)

The Myth of Rock is the first full-length album by industrial/hip hop artists Consolidated, released in 1990. The album peaked at No. 24 on the CMJ Radio Top 150 while the album track "Dysfunctional Relationship" posted at No. 24 on the CMJ Radio Top Cuts.

== Reception ==
Professional ratings
Review scores
Source	Rating
AllMusic	2.5/5 stars
Q	3/5 stars

Jason Pettigrew at Alternative Press lauded The Myth of Rock as "a fascinating palette of noises, beats and musique concrete" and noted that, on a political level, the band is intelligent and well informed, but warned that "nobody likes to be bludgeoned... while listening to records." Paul Davies from Q concurred with 'the sound is a bruisingly, hard-hitting and uncompromising as the message".

== Track listing ==
1. "Product" (4:26)
2. "This Is a Collective" (3:24)
3. "America Number One" (4:25)
4. "Weakness (Part I)" (0:53)
5. "Fight the Fascists" (6:26)
6. "Music That Lifts Up Our Savior Jesus Christ" (0:45)
7. "Josephine the Singer" (3:31)
8. "Poland" (2:59)
9. "Is This the Cheese Dip" (0:50)
10. "Message to the People" (4:11)
11. "Stop the War Against the Black Community" (1:05)
12. "White American Male (The Truth Hurts)" (4:48)
13. "Weakness (Part II)" (1:47)
14. "It's About That Time" (1:08)
15. "Love, Honor and Respect" (3:05)
16. "Strike" (4:42)
17. "Brian Wilson Speaks" (1:12)
18. "Dysfunctional Relationship" (2:51)
19. "There Is a Mountain Filled with Blood" (0:54)
20. "Consolidated" (3:33)
