= Business of Punishment =

Studio album by Consolidated
- Released: 1994
- Genre: Industrial, hip hop
- Length: 70:24
- Label: London; Polygram

Consolidated chronology
Warning: Explicit Lyrics (1993)	Business of Punishment (1994)	Dropped (1998)

Professional ratings
Review scores
Source	Rating
AllMusic	3/5 stars

Business of Punishment is the fourth full-length album by industrial/hip hop artists Consolidated, released in 1994. It was their only record to be released by London Records. The album peaked at No. 28 on the CMJ Radio Top 150 and No. 53 on the UK Albums Chart.

The cover is by Barbara Kruger.

== Track listing ==
1. "Cutting" – 5:09
2. "Business of Punishment" – 5:50
3. "Born of a Woman" – 4:01
4. "Das Habe Ich Nicht Gewusst" – 5:20
5. "No Answer for a Dancer" – 4:44
6. "Meat, Meat, Meat & Meat" – 0:50
7. "Dog & Pony Show" – 3:42
8. "Today Is My Birthday" – 6:23
9. "Butyric Acid" – 3:53
10. "Woman Shoots John" – 4:35
11. "Consolidated Buries the Mammoth" – 5:47
12. "Worthy Victim" – 5:19
13. "Recuperation" – 2:24
14. "Empowerless" – 7:35
15. "Emancipate Yourself" – 4:52
