= Until December =

American rock band

- Origin: San Francisco, CA
- Genres: Dance-rock - Hi-NRG - new wave - hard rock - synth-pop
- Years active: 1985–1987
- Labels: Columbia Records, 415 Records, CBS Records
- Spinoffs: Consolidated, Maximillion's Motorcycle Club
- Past members: Tim Huthert; Mark Pistel; Greg Senzer; Adam Sherburne; Philip Steir; Bryan Weisberg

Until December was a San Francisco-based rock band that formed in November 1984. The founding members were Adam Sherburne, Bryan Weisberg, and Greg Senzer. The band released four 12" singles in 1985 on 415 Records / CBS. A self-titled album Until December was released in 1986 by 415 Records / CBS, which contained their biggest hit "Heaven".

Other notable songs performed by Until December include their song "Until December", "Live Alone In Shame" (B-Side to the 12" of "Until December - The Berlin Mix") and a cover of the song "Bela Lugosi's Dead" by Bauhaus. In 1986, they released 12" singles of "Call Me" B/W "Free Again" and "Secrets (I Won't Tell)" B/W "We Are The Boys".

They toured the U.S. as a headliner and with seminal 80's bands such as New Order, Gene Loves Jezebel, and Specimen. The band was especially popular in the leather subculture. Before the band split up they expanded their line up to a five-piece with the addition of Mark Pistel on bass and Tim Huthert, from Specimen, as a second drummer.

Adam Sherburne later formed the band Consolidated in the 1990s. Bryan Weisberg later formed Maximillion's Motorcycle Club with Tim Huthert. Greg (Auggie) Senzer, the former drummer, owns and operates a motorcycle customizing shop and plays with several Bay Area bands.

== Track listing for "Until December" ==
Logo

1. No Gift Refused - 4:19
2. Heaven - 4:19
3. Sequence Line - 3:46
4. Mirrors - 3:49
5. Call Me - 3:33
6. Forgive and Still Forget - 4:24
7. Free Again - 4:46
8. Zodiac Drum Solo - 1:18
9. Slave - 4:51
10. Geisha - 6:26

The original 1986 release.

== Track listing for "Until December" The 415 Sessions Double CD Release ==
=== This Side ===
1. No Gift Refused - 4:19
2. Heaven - 4:19
3. Sequence Line - 3:46
4. Mirrors - 3:49
5. Call Me - 3:33
6. Forgive and Still Forget - 4:24
7. Free Again - 4:46
8. Zodiac Drum Solo - 1:18
9. Slave - 4:51
10. Geisha - 6:26
11. Secrets (I Won't Tell) (Single Version) - 3:26
12. We Are The Boys (Single Version) - 2:39
13. Until December (Single Version) - 3:36
14. Live Alone In Shame (Single Version) - 3:35
15. Bela Lugosi's Dead (Single Version) - 4:46

=== Daddy Side ===
1. Secrets (I Won't Tell) (Extended Version) - 6:36
2. We Are The Boys (Extended Version) -
3. Heaven (Extended Version) -
4. Heaven (Dub Version) -
5. Call Me (12" Version) -
6. Call Me (13" Version) -
7. Free Again (My Sin - Sylvester Mix) featuring Sylvester - 4:56
8. Free Again (Touch Me - Live Hooker Mix) - 4:16
9. Live Alone In Shame (Berlin Mix) - 8:13
10. Until December (12" Version) - 6:05
11. Live Alone In Shame (Cotati Mix) - 4:54
12. Bela Lugosi's Dead (12" Version) - 6:32

This is the August 2010 re-issue of the album on Wounded Bird Records which includes the 12" Singles released before the original 1986 album. The track "Forgive and Still Forget" was originally titled "Secrets (I Won't Tell) is included as well as are the remixed versions of "Heaven", "Call Me", and "Free Again". The naming of each individual disc as "This Side" (CD1) and "Daddy Side" (CD2) references the standard naming convention for the A and B-sides that Until December used on 12" singles and albums starting with "Secrets (I Won't Tell)" / "We Are The Boys".

== Track listing for promo "Until December – Heaven / Bela Lugosi's Dead" ==
This side

- A1 Heaven (Extended Version) Remix – Andy Wallace; Written-By – A. Sherburne*, B. Weisberg* 7:01

Daddy Side

- B1 Heaven (Dub Version) Remix – Andy Wallace; Written-By – A. Sherburne*, B. Weisberg* 6:46
- B2 Bela Lugosi's Dead Written-By – Bauhaus* 6:38
