= Arcadius Gurland =

Arcadius Rudolph Lang Gurland (1 September 1904, Moscow – 27 March, 1979, Darmstadt) was a German political scientist of Russian origin. Born in Moscow in 1904, he lived through the Russian Revolution as a teenager, developing political sympathies with the Mensheviks. He travelled into exile with his parents, settling in Germany where he completed his schooling at the Goethe-Gymnasium in Berlin-Wilmersdorf. He joined the Sozialistische Proletarierjugend, a youth movement close to the Independent Social Democratic Party of Germany (USPD). This party was formed by the left wing of the Social Democratic Party of Germany, when it broke with Majority Social Democratic Party of Germany over their support for German participation in the First World War.

Gurland worked for the Institute for Social Research (IfSR) in New York from 1940 to 1945. By this time he had come to focus his work on the economics of the Nazi state. In 1943 he worked with two colleagues from the IfSR, Franz Neumann and Otto Kirchheimer, for a special United States congressional committee established in 1940 to Study Problems of American Small Business.

== Selected works ==
In German:

- (1925) Der proletarische Klassenkampf in der Gegenwart: Zur taktischen Orientierung der Sozialdemokratie in der Nachkriegsphase des Kapitalismus (The proletarian class struggle in the present: On the tactical orientation of social democracy in the post-war phase of capitalism) Leipzig:Leipziger Buchdruckerei
- (1930) Marxismus und Diktatur (Marxism and Dictatorship), Leipzig: Leipziger Buchdruckerei
- (1931) Das Heute der proletarischen Aktion. Hemmnisse und Wandlungen im Klassenkampf Berlin: E. Laub

In English:

- (1941) "Technological Trends and Economic Structure under National Socialism ", Studies in Philosophy and Social Science Vol. IX, New York: Institute for Social Research
- (1943) The Fate of Small Business in Nazi Germany Washington: United States Senate Special Committee to Study Problems of American Small Business, with Otto Kirchheimer and Franz Neumann

Translations:

- (1960) Motivforschung und Absatzlenkung, German translation of Motivation Research and Marketing Management, Joseph Newman (1957) Boston: Harvard University, Graduate School of Business Administration, Division of Research
- (1960) Amerika – Die Revolution des Jahrhunderts, German translation of La République Americaine, Raymond Bruckberger (1959) Paris: Gallimard
- (1961) Sigmund Freuds Sendung, German translation of Sigmund Freud's Mission, Erich Fromm (1959)
