= Friendly Fascism (book) =

1980 book written by Bertram Gross

Friendly Fascism: The New Face of Power in America
- First edition cover
- Author: Bertram Gross
- Publisher: M. Evans & Company
- Publication date: June 1, 1980
- Publication place: United States
- Media type: Print (hardcover)
- Pages: 419
- ISBN: 0871313170

Friendly Fascism: The New Face of Power in America is a book written by Bertram Gross, American social scientist and professor of political science at Hunter College. The book was published on June 1, 1980, by M. Evans & Company as a 419-page hardback book containing 440 quotations and sources. It examines the history of fascism and, based on the growth of big business and big government, describes possible political scenarios for a future United States. According to a 1981 review in the journal Crime and Social Justice, the book is described as "timely" on a subject requiring serious consideration. It is about the dangers of fascism, focusing primarily on the United States, but being aware that monopoly capitalism needs to be understood internationally since capitalism "is not a national mode of production".

== Reactions ==
According to Jason Epstein, editor, publisher and book reviewer for The New York Review of Books, "Friendly Fascism [...] reflects what seems to be a widespread feeling among liberals as well as conservatives that democracy in America has played itself out: that soon Americans won’t be able to govern themselves". According to Gaddis Smith, professor emeritus of history at Yale University and an expert on American foreign relations, the book is an "insightful lament over the growth of centralized power by business and government in alliance under the direction of faceless managers who [...] are replacing democracy with a form of benevolent fascism". Writing on behalf of Eclectica Magazine, reviewer Dale Wharton comments that the book offers "faint hope of averting neofascism", but as a possible offset suggests raising aspirations, notably by "setting forth clear lofty goals, broad enough to embrace a great majority". Help may come from insiders since "bubbling upward from all levels of the Establishment are longings for fulfilling employment disconnected from consumer exploitation, environmental degradation, or militarism".

Reviewer Dennis Phillips notes in the Australian Journal of Law & Society that Gross wrote Friendly Fascism before Ronald Reagan had become President of the United States, but Reagan's United States, presumed in part to be a result of neofascist techniques described in the book, had "proven Bertram Gross to be an amazingly astute prophet . [...] The evidence for this [in the book] is stunning". According to a book review in the journal Crime and Social Justice by Gregory Shank of the Institute for the Study of Labor and Economic Crisis, "Friendly Fascism [...] is written to alert readers to a clear and present danger in the current trajectory of American politics".

More recently in 2016, the book prompted the following response from Michael Moore right after Donald Trump was elected President: "The next wave of fascists will not come with cattle cars and concentration camps, but they'll come with a smiley face and maybe a TV show. [...] That's how the 21st-century fascists will essentially take over".

== See also ==
- Anti-fascism
- Manifesto of the Anti-Fascist Intellectuals
- Nineteen Eighty-Four, 1949 book
- The Power Elite, 1956 book
- Power (social and political)
- "The Waldo Moment", 2013 TV episode
