= The Dead Stars on Hollywood =

American rock band

- Origin: New York City, New York, USA
- Genres: Glam rock, new wave, alternative rock, gothic rock, industrial rock, post-punk
- Years active: 2000–2012
- Label: Apocalypstick UK
- Members: Kneel Cohn; Todd Bryerton
- Past members: TJ Hamilton; Gino Mari; Brandt Sundholm; Troy Stutzman; Jeff Warner; Paul Mauceri; Chris Waage; Eric Wybenga; Terry Taylor; Annie Halo
- Website: deadstarsonhollywood.com

The Dead Stars on Hollywood were an American rock band based in New York City, that incorporated elements of glam, new wave and goth into their alternative rock sound. The group's name was inspired by the "cinematic" imagery of the glory days of old Hollywood.

The band's sound has been compared to and influenced by T. Rex, Love and Rockets and includes lyrical references to Sigue Sigue Sputnik.

== Biography ==
The Dead Stars on Hollywood performed live shows in bars and clubs throughout Portland, Oregon as they recorded their demo recordings as early as 1998 under the band name Strongbox. The band was known to rehearse and perform in the popular local classic arcade Ground Kontrol. In 1998, founding member Kneel Cohn became known also as a producer for his remixing and production work on the song "Falling Up" by the band Collide which appeared on their remix album Distort released on Cargo Records.

British producer Fran Ashcroft known for his work with Damon Albarn of the UK band Blur and Lords Of Acid recorded and produced two singles which appear on the Anthems For The Friendly-Fire Generation EP released on the Apocalypstick UK label.

The band achieved attention as a supporting act for bands Placebo, Gwar and Idlewild. The song "Flaunt It Like This" was being heard on college radio and as a result the song "Prozac Smile" appeared in the motion picture "Blast" released in 2000 starring Liesel Matthews, Adam LaVorgna and PJ Soles.

The group was known for its affiliation with the local Portland music scene which at the time included bands such as The Dandy Warhols, Brian Jonestown Massacre, Sleater Kinney, Everclear, and Elliott Smith. Guitarist Peter Holmstrom of The Dandy Warhols played guitar on the song "Planet Girl".

Following the release of Anthems For The Friendly-Fire Generation in 2003, the band relocated to New York City. Over the next three years the band line-up went through several changes as they began to re-establish themselves in their new surroundings and further define their sound performing in NYC live music mainstays Knitting Factory, Mo Pitkin's and Luna Lounge. The band dissolved in 2012.

Founder Kneel Cohn started a new band called Warshow Angels in 2013.

== Discography ==
=== Albums ===
- The Strongbox Sessions (2000)
- Anthems for the Friendly-Fire Generation (2003)
- The Seventh Floor Sessions unreleased (2007)

=== Singles ===
- "Flaunt It Like This" (2000)
- "Prozac Smile" (2000)
- "Bang Bang Love" (2003)
- "Planet Girl" (2003)
- "Dive" (2005)
- "Bruises" (2005)
- "Red Plastik Crush" (2007)
- "Sexy TV Trash" (2009)

== Other websites ==
- The Official Dead Stars On Hollywood website
- The Official Dead Stars On Hollywood myspace
- The Official Discogs website
