= Bertram Myron Gross =

American social scientist (1912–1997)

Bertram Myron Gross in 1960 in Jerusalem

Bertram Myron Gross (1912 – March 12, 1997) was an American social scientist, federal bureaucrat and Professor of Political Science at Hunter College (CUNY). He is known from his book Friendly Fascism: The New Face of Power in America from 1980, and as primary author of the Humphrey–Hawkins Full Employment Act.

== Early life and education ==
Bertram Myron Gross was born in 1912 in Philadelphia. He received his B.A. in English and philosophy and his M.A. in English from the University of Pennsylvania.

== Career ==
In the late 1930s, he started as a federal bureaucrat in Washington. From 1941 to 1945 he was a staff member of a number of Senate committees. In 1940 he was appointed Chief, Research and Hearing for the Special Committee to Study Problems of American Small Business. With funding from the Carnegie Foundation of New York, he took responsibility for producing The Fate of Small Business in Nazi Germany, written by A. R. L. Gurland, Otto Kirchheimer and Franz Neumann. He also subsequently wrote the Roosevelt-Truman full employment bills of 1944 and 1945, which led to the Employment Act of 1946. From 1946 to 1952 he was executive secretary of the President's Council of Economic Advisers and was among those who advocated making Gross National Product a key measurement of the economy, which he later regretted. "I was one of the key figures pressing for it then. Who knew that pushing for growth would distort all human values and priorities?," he said.

In 1953, he moved with his family to Israel, where he served as an economic advisor in the Prime Minister's Office and as a visiting professor at the Hebrew University, where he established their program in Public Administration. He returned to the United States in the 1960s and joined the faculty of Syracuse University in the Maxwell School of Citizenship and Public Affairs. In 1961–62, he was a Fellow at the Center for Advanced Study in the Behavioral Sciences, Palo Alto; and, in 1962–63, he was the Leatherbee Lecturer at the Harvard Business School.

In 1970, Bertram Gross was president of the Society for General Systems Research. From 1970 to 1982 he was Distinguished Professor of Political Science and Urban Affairs at Hunter College and the CUNY Graduate Center.

== Personal life ==
He was married to Nora Faine Gross and was survived by his second wife, Kusum Singh. He was the father of four sons, including Nobel Prize winner David J. Gross.

== Publications ==
Gross wrote several books and articles. A selection:

- 1953, "The Legislative Struggle: A Study in Social Combat", New York: McGraw Hill.
- 1954, The hard money crusade, with Wilfred Lumer, Washington: Public Affairs Institute.
- 1963, An annotated bibliography on national economic planning, Syracuse, N.Y.: Maxwell Graduate School of Citizenship and Public Affairs.
- 1964, The managing of organizations: The administrative struggle New York: Free Press of Glencoe.
- 1966, The state of the nation : social systems accounting, New York : Tavistock Publications, 1966, 166 p.
- 1967, (eds.) Social goals and indicators for American society, Philadelphia: American Academy of Political and Social Science.
- 1967, Action under planning: The guidance of economic development, New York: McGraw-Hill Book Co.
- 1968, Organizations and their managing, New York: Free Press.
- 1968, A great society?, New York: Basic Books.
- 1970, Political intelligence for America's future, with Michael Springer, Philadelphia: None.
- 1978, The Legislative Struggle: A Study in Social Combat, Reprint of 1953 book. Conn.: Greenwood Press.
- 1980, Friendly Fascism: The New Face of Power in America, New York: M. Evans.
- 1993, Legislative strategy: Shaping public policy, with Edward V. Schneier, New York: St. Martin's Press.
- 1993, Congress today, with Edward V. Schneier, New York: St. Martin's Press.
- 1993, Human rights for the 2lst century, foundations for responsible hope: A U.S. post Soviet dialogue Armonk,, with Peter H. Juviler, V.A. Kartashkin & E.A. Lukasheva (eds.), New York: M.E. Sharpe.
