= Kneel Cohn =

American singer-songwriter (born 1976)

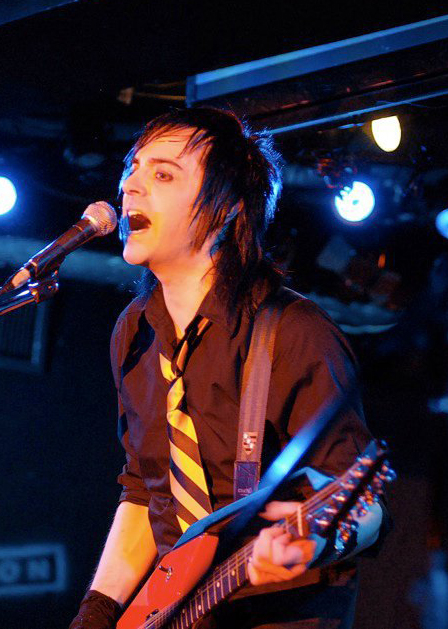
- Kneel Cohn performing live in NYC at Crash Mansion

Background information
- Born: January 12, 1976 (age 50)
- Origin: New York City, United States
- Genres: Alternative rock Glam rock
- Instruments: Vocals, Guitar, Bass, Keyboards

Kneel Cohn (born January 12, 1976) in The Bronx, New York is the primary songwriter, lead singer and guitarist for Warshow Angels, and The Dead Stars On Hollywood, known for the songs "Prozac Smile" and "Flaunt it Like This". He has performed with, produced songs and done remixing and production work with bands including Collide, Contagion, Patti Rothberg, and members of Crass, Buzzcocks, The Dandy Warhols, Hanoi Rocks, UK Subs, Consolidated, Black 'n Blue and Sin Corporation.

He appears in the film Blast, starring Liesel Matthews, Adam LaVorgna and PJ Soles, a cameo in the documentary Vegucated. and the CFEI documentary "Home On The Range" (2016).

Cohn is vegan and known for his involvement in animal rights issues. He regularly performs and DJs on behalf of many animal rights organizations including Farm Sanctuary, Animals Asia, and CFEI. In April 2009 he designed and launched Vegetable Slut, a line of animal rights activist pinback buttons and t-shirts.

He produced Home On The Range, a farm animal benefit compilation CD and documentary film for the non-profit organization CFEI (Compassionate Farming Education Initiative). The album includes songs by Moby, Joan Jett, Yoko Ono, Bright Eyes, The Pretenders, Nellie McKay, Howard Jones, Princess Superstar and Warshow Angels.

== Biography ==
=== Personal life ===
Kneel's former girlfriend Barbara Swan is the cousin of Kathleen Hanna of the bands Bikini Kill (credited for starting the riot grrrl movement) and Le Tigre.

Kneel is credited for the skating name of roller derby all-star "Baby Ruthless" of New York City's Gotham Girls Roller Derby. The original Baby Ruthless, Cohn's ex-girlfriend, is featured in the UK band Towers Of London's music video for their song "How Rude She Was".

== Other websites ==
- The Official Warshow Angels website
- The Official Home On The Range benefit website
- The Official Dead Stars On Hollywood website
- The Official Dead Stars On Hollywood myspace
- The Official Discogs website
