= Social Justice (journal) =

- Discipline: Social justice
- Language: English
- Edited by: Stefania De Petris; Gregory Shank

Publication details
- Former names: Crime and Social Justice; Contemporary Marxism
- History: 1974–present
- Frequency: Quarterly

Standard abbreviations
- ISO 4: Soc. Justice

Indexing
- ISSN: 1043-1578
- LCCN: 90642698
- JSTOR: 10431578
- OCLC no.: 782072558

Links
- Journal homepage; Online archive, Crime and Social Justice, 1974–1987; Online archive, Contemporary Marxism, 1980–1986

Social Justice is a quarterly peer-reviewed academic journal that was established in 1974 as Crime and Social Justice. It absorbed Contemporary Marxism (1980–1986) in 1987 and adopted its current name in 1988. The journal covers research on all aspects of social justice, including issues of crime, police repression, and the penal system; globalization; human and civil rights; immigration issues; welfare and education, ethnic and gender relations, and persistent global inequalities. The editors-in-chief are Stefania De Petris and Gregory Shank.
