= Consolidated (band) =

American radical activist music group

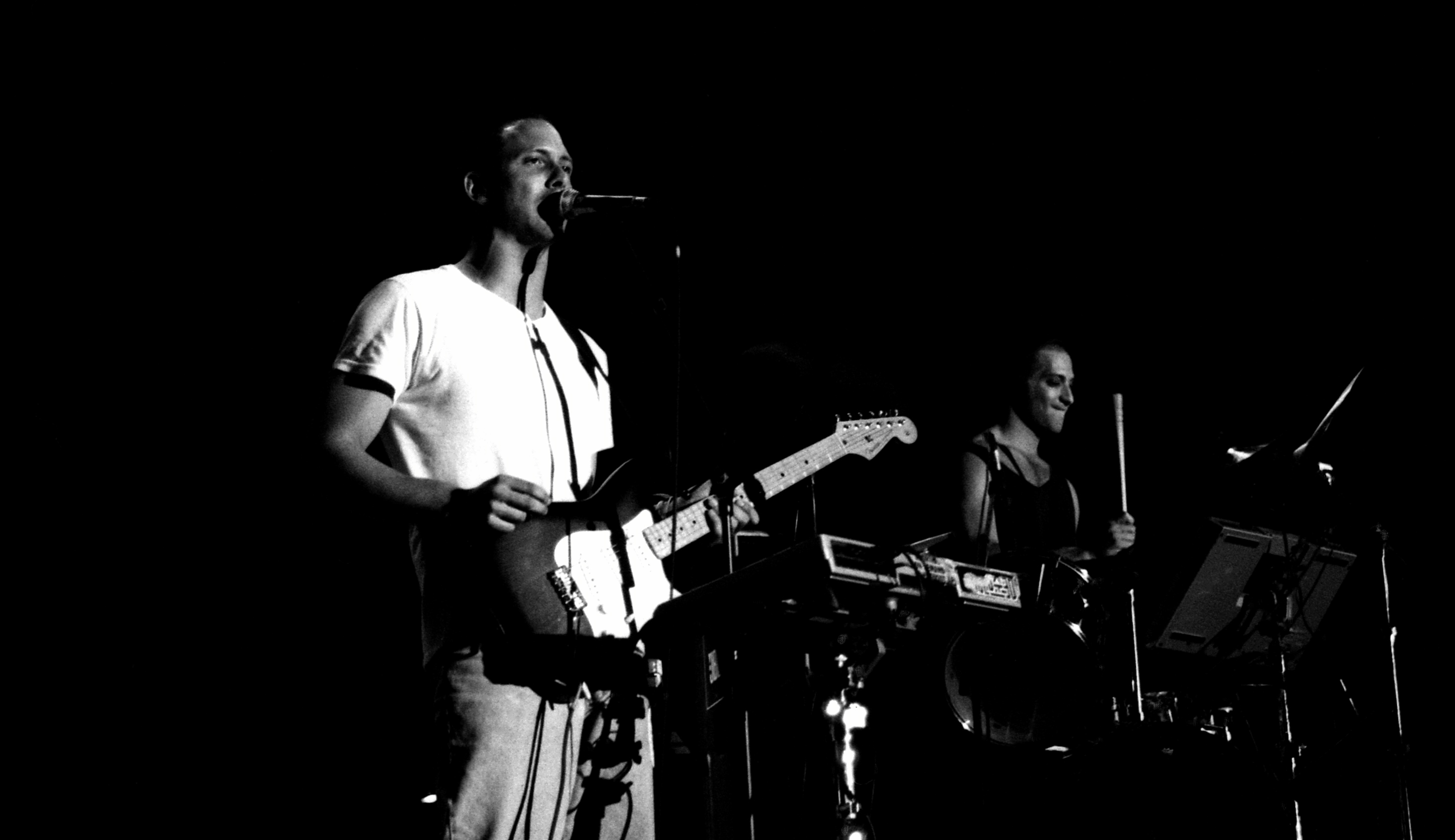
- Consolidated playing in Sweden in 1993

Background information
- Origin: San Francisco, California
- Genres: Alternative dance; hip hop; industrial
- Years active: 1989–present
- Labels: I.R.S. Records; Nettwerk; Zoth Ommog
- Members: Adam Sherburne; Mark Pistel
- Past members: Gilly Ann Hanner; James Dickson; Lisa Cash; Michael Dunn; Philip Steir

Consolidated is an American radical activist music group, formed in 1988 and best known in the early 1990s as an alternative dance/industrial music band. Between 1989 and 1994, their instrumental style evolved from industrial, to hip-hop, to hard rock and funk with mixtures of live instruments and electronic instruments. They were distinguished by left-leaning political activism and politically radical lyrics, as well as their innovative sonic collages which blended industrial and hip-hop styles.

Their music often focused on vegetarianism, women's rights, animal rights, fighting racism and homophobia, the unity of oppression, World War II and the Holocaust, along with pointed criticism of capitalism and American nationalism. Although often criticized as having strident and confrontational lyrics, Consolidated tempered the intensity of their songs with many instances of self-deprecating humor. They admitted to their own struggles with addressing complex social issues within the constraining structures of pop music, an artistic form they referred to as "a neutralized medium," but explained that they did so because they felt that it might be their only chance to reach a mass audience with progressive messages of social justice.

Their signature song, "Consolidated", contained the mission statement "Consolidated is not even a consumer product... yet. This is no rock and roll band. It is a unique creative vision of a small isolated group of individuals. A team that's skilled and dedicated. Searching for the knowledge that will enable them to improve the quality of their lives and the lives of those around them."

== History ==
The band was formed in the early part of 1988 in San Francisco, California after each of the founding members had grown dissatisfied with other music projects they had been involved in. Consolidated's original line-up consisted of Adam Sherburne (guitar and vocals, previously lead singer of Until December), Mark Pistel (samples, sequencers and keyboards/synths), and Philip Steir (drums). In 1990 they released their debut album The Myth of Rock, and toured North America with Meat Beat Manifesto the following year.

Consolidated's subsequent line-ups have consisted of Adam Sherburne, Todd Bryerton (drums), Michael Dunn (bass), and Kevin Carnes (drums) with some mixing and engineering by Mark Pistel.

After 1994, the original line-up went their separate ways. Since that time, the project has been mainly under the direction of Adam Sherburne, with peripheral involvement by Mark Pistel (primarily mixing and engineering the albums). Following the split of the original line-up, Consolidated has continued to evolve musically through styles reminiscent of West Coast hip-hop, R&B, rock, and jazz similar to Miles Davis's early 1970s experimentation. Initially known for their strident, lyric-heavy albums, their most recent recordings have been almost entirely instrumental improvisations.

Co-founders Mark Pistel (programming/vocals) and Philip Steir (programming/vocals) continued to do many remix projects after leaving the band. Mark Pistel made one album under the name Pistel, and has also played with the live/touring incarnation of Meat Beat Manifesto as well as a group called Electronic Dub Collective. He is currently co-producing and touring with Hercules and Love Affair. Philip Steir co-owns a recording studio called Toast. Drummer Todd Bryerton of the band's later line-up performs with Kneel Cohn in the NYC post-glam band The Dead Stars on Hollywood.

== Live performances ==
In each of their live performances, Consolidated included a period of time in which microphones were passed among audience members, who could then discuss, rebut, argue or elaborate upon the topics of Consolidated's songs in a process they dubbed "inter-active democracy." Consolidated devised these interactions as a way to subvert the typically passive experience of watching a band perform, empowering the audience members to respond and articulate their own opinions on issues addressed in the song lyrics or even the nature of the performance itself. Consolidated recorded many of these interactions and sampled excerpts of them to be included on their albums. In some cases, these samples were arranged and featured as short interludes between songs, while in other cases they were worked into the sonic collages of the songs themselves (e.g., "Crusading Rap Guys" on the 1991 LP Friendly Fa$cism.)

Consolidated's live performances featured video montages that were either projected onto large screens, or featured on multiple television sets positioned along the perimeter of the stage. The video footage included their promotional music video clips for their singles, as well as video art composed of found footage which corresponded to the lyrical topics of specific songs (e.g., myths of male sexuality, sexist depictions of women in mass media, and the inhumane treatment of animals in laboratories and slaughterhouses).

Local, regional and national activist groups were invited by Consolidated to set up tables and information kiosks at their shows while they were on tour.

== Discography ==
An entry on a previous version of Consolidated's official website noted that all their albums have combined to sell over 500,000 copies.

- ¡Consolidated! EP (Zoth Ommog | Muzic Research | Nettwerk, 1989)
- The Myth of Rock (Nettwerk | I.R.S., 1990) - No. 24 CMJ Radio Top 150
- Dysfunctional EP (Nettwerk | I.R.S., 1990)
- This Is a Collective EP (Nettwerk | I.R.S., 1990)
- Friendly Fa$cism (Nettwerk | I.R.S., 1991)
- Brutal Equation EP (Nettwerk | I.R.S., 1991)
- Unity of Oppression EP (Nettwerk | I.R.S., 1991)
- This Is Fascism EP (Nettwerk | I.R.S., 1991)
- Play More Music (Nettwerk | I.R.S., 1992)
- Tool and Die EP (Nettwerk | I.R.S., 1992)
- You Suck / Crackhouse EP (Nettwerk | I.R.S., 1992)
- Warning: Explicit Lyrics EP (Nettwerk | I.R.S., 1993)
- Business of Punishment (London/Polygram, 1994) – No. 28 CMJ Radio Top 150 – No. 53 UK Albums Chart
- Butyric Acid 12" (London/Polygram, 1994)
- Dropped (G7 Welcoming Committee, 1997)
- Tikkun (Survivor Demos) (Orchard Records, 1999)
- The End of Meaning (Consolidated Artists, 2000)
- Free Music or Stockpiled Death (2003)
- Free Music! Stop America! (2005)
- Fock Songs: Music from the Fockumentary "Free Music! Stop America!" EP (2007)
- 2012: The End of Times, The End of Bands - as Ha! Ha! Assclown! (2012)
- The Sound of How People Could Be to Each Other - as Free Music! Stop America! (2012)
- We're Already There (2021)
- We're Already There (Remixes) (2023)
- Too Much Music! '22-'24 (2024)
