= Wendy-O Matik =

American poet

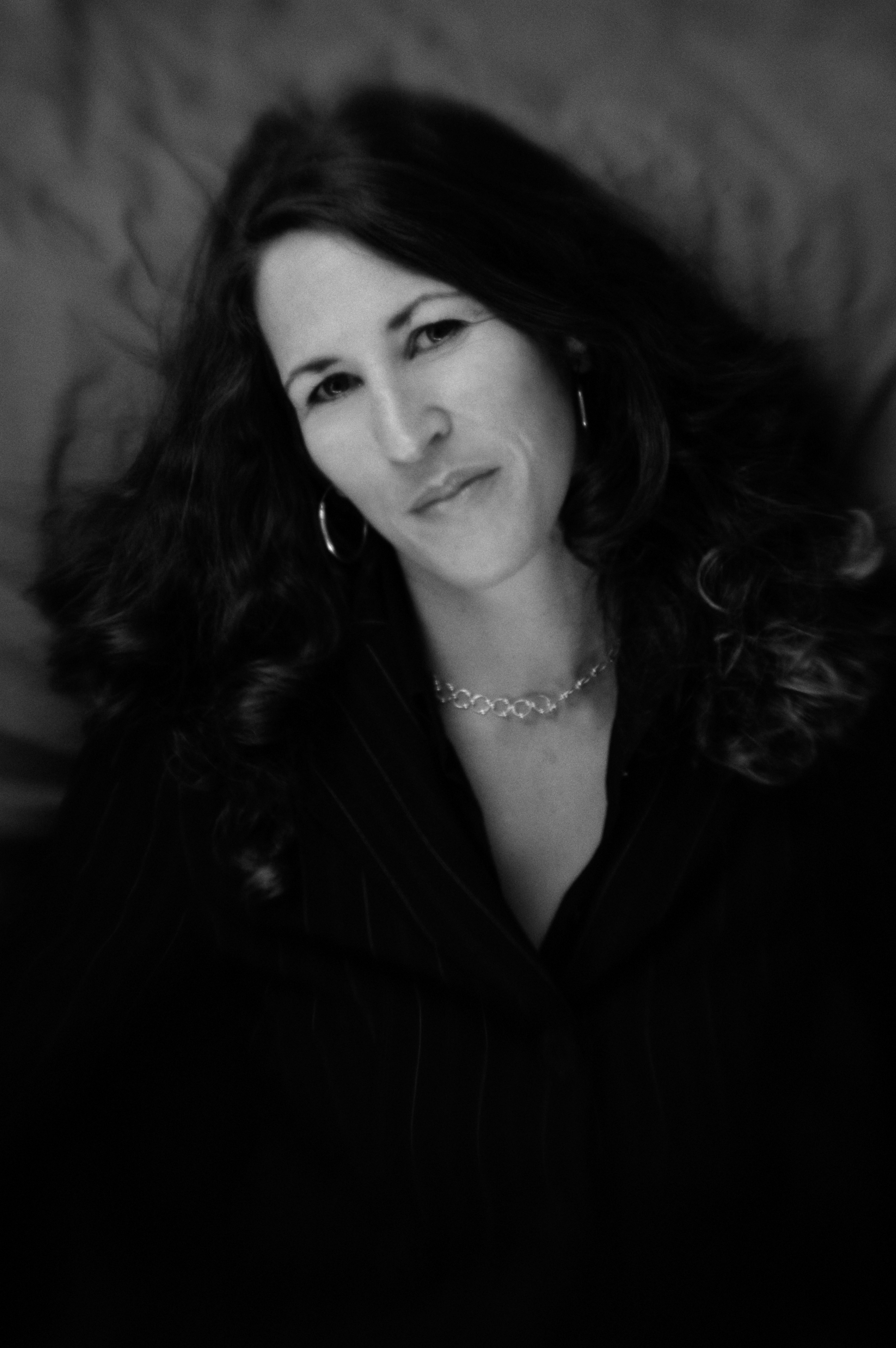
Wendy-O Matik

Wendy-O Matik (born Wendy Millstine on July 19, 1966 in Covina, California) is a Bay Area-based freelance writer, poet, performance and spoken word artist, and radical love activist. Her website defines radical love as "the freedom to love whom you want, how you want, and as many as you want, so long as personal integrity, respect, honesty, and consent are at the core of any and all relationships."

She graduated from the University of California, Berkeley in 1988 with a Bachelor of Arts Degree in Political Science, and also holds a state-certified degree as a holistic Nutrition Consultant, specializing in diet and stress reduction, from Bauman College, Berkeley, CA (2006).

Her book Redefining Our Relationships: Guidelines for Responsible Open Relationships was published in 2002: it has been reprinted several times, and is now required reading in the human sexuality class at San Francisco State University. Since its publication, she has taught over a hundred Radical Love & Relationship workshops internationally. She is often invited to speak at venues such as universities and progressive bookstores. She has been described by the magazine Profane Existence as "a special kind of revolutionary woman".

== Selected works ==
- Redefining Our Relationships: Guidelines for Responsible Open Relationships, Defiant Times Press (2002), ISBN 1-58790-015-7 (7th printing)

=== Series ===
- Five Good Minutes: 100 Morning Practices To Help You Stay Calm & Focused All Day Long ISBN 1-57224-414-3, New Harbinger Publications (2005)
- Five Good Minutes in the Evening: 100 Mindful Practices to Help You Unwind from the Day & Make the Most of Your Night ISBN 1-57224-455-0 (2006)
- Five Good Minutes at Work: 100 Mindful Practices to Help You Relieve Stress & Bring Your Best to Work ISBN 1-57224-490-9 (2007)
- Five Good Minutes With the One You Love: 100 Mindful Practices to Deepen & Renew Your Love Every Day ISBN 1-57224-512-3 (2008)
- Five Good Minutes in Your Body: 100 Mindful Practices to Help You Accept Yourself and Feel at Home in Your Body ISBN 1-57224-596-4 (2009)
- Daily Meditations for Calming Your Anxious Mind, New Harbinger Publications ISBN 1-57224-540-9 (2008)
- The Power of Connection: 50 Meditations to Nurture Your Sense of Connection to Yourself, Others, & the World Around You, New Harbinger Publications, (Spring 2011)

=== Anthologies ===
- Sex & Relationships: An Anthology, ISBN 0-7575-1664-5 edited by John Elia, Ph.D. & Ivy Chen, MPH, Kendall/Hunt Publishing (2005)
- In Our Own Words: A Generation Defining Itself, edited by Marlow Peerse Weaver, MW Enterprises (2005)
- Concrete Dreams: Manic D Press Early Works, ISBN 0-916397-75-0 Manic D Press (2002)
- Revival: Spoken Word from Lollapalooza '94, ISBN 0-916397-41-6 Manic D Press (1995)
- Signs of Life: Channel Surfing Through '90s Culture, ISBN 0-916397-21-1 Manic D Press (1994)
- Psyche Subversion, Andromeda Press (1992)

=== Poetry ===
- What I Left Behind, Defiant Times Press (2003)
- Damaged Goods, Defiant Times Press (2001)
- Gutless, Defiant Times Press (1998)
- Love Like Rage, Manic D Press (1994) ISBN 0-916397-31-9
- Fill It Full of Holes, Defiant Times Press (1995)
- She Knew Better, Manic D Press (1992)
- So Much for Passion, Manic D Press (1990)

== Discography ==
- Ladyfest Melbourne Compilation 2003, Melbourne, Australia (Revolver Upstairs (2003)
- Solo Stuff I: Recorded Live at the Royal George (New Cross, London), UK (2003)
- Total War Against State & Capital, Vol. II, Hidden Power Enterprises, Sweden (2003)
- Total War Against State & Capital, Vol. I, Hidden Power Enterprises, Sweden (2001)
- Spoken Word Compilation (Pug-016), Evolution Records, USA (2001)
- Krauts, Yanks & Limey!, Bremen, Oakland, Bath Sampler, GEMA Records, Germany (1998)
- Home Alive: The Art of Self Defense, Epic Records, USA (1996)
- Gag Order, False Faces, Judgmental Records, USA (1994)
- Logical Nonsense/Grimple Split, East Bay Menace Records, USA (1993)
- Consolidated, Play More Music, Play It Again Sam Records-Netwerk Europe (1992)
- Powerless II: No More Flowers, No More Ribbons, Black Plastic Records, USA (1992)
- Give Me Back, Ebullition Records, USA (1991)
- Econochrist, Ebullition Records, USA (1988–1993)

== Videography ==
- Step Up and Be Vocal, Interviews zu Queer Punk und Feminismus in San Francisco (2001) Bremen, Germany, 60 min
- Gynopunk, University of California Berkeley, Senior Film Project, USA (May 1994)
