= Dual state =

Dual state or Dual State may refer to:

- Austria-Hungary
- The Dual State: A Contribution to the Theory of Dictatorship, 1941 book by Ernst Fraenkel (political scientist)
  - Dual state (model), a political science model originated by Fraenkel in this book
- Involving two states
