= Loïc Wacquant =

French sociologist (born 1960)

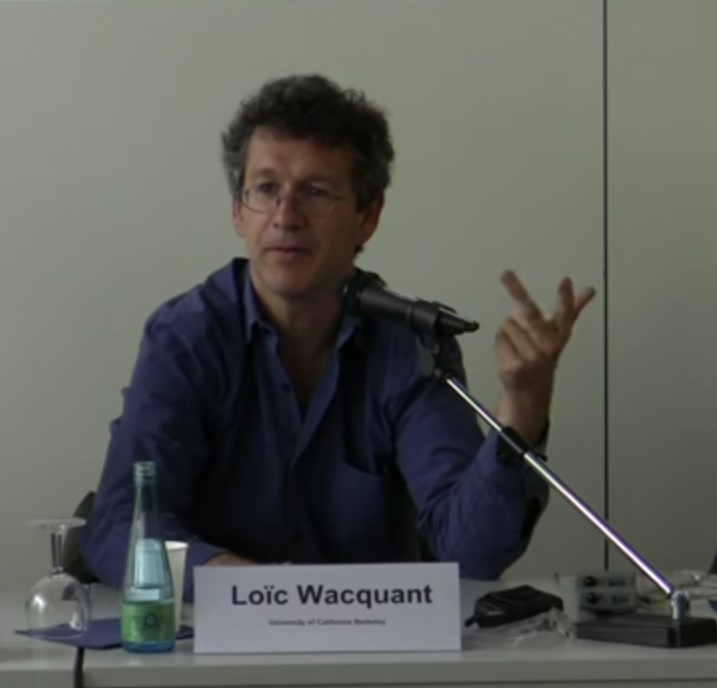
- Wacquant in Berlin in 2009.
- Born: August 26, 1960 (age 66); Nîmes, Languedoc-Roussillon, France
- Other name: Loïc J. D. Wacquant

Academic background
- Education: HEC Paris; University of Chicago (Ph.D., 1994)
- Thesis: Urban outcasts: Color, class, and place in two advanced societies (1994)
- Doctoral advisor: William Julius Wilson, George Steinmetz, Moishe Postone
- Influences: Pierre Bourdieu

Academic work
- Discipline: Sociologist
- Sub-discipline: Urban sociology
- Institutions: University of Berkeley
- Main interests: Race, Incarceration, Ghettos
- Website: https://loicwacquant.org/

Loïc Wacquant (French pronunciation: [lɔik vakɑ̃]; born 26 August 1960) is a French sociologist specializing in urban sociology, urban poverty, racial inequality, the body, social theory and ethnography.

Wacquant is a professor of sociology at the University of California, Berkeley, where he is affiliated with the Center for the Study of Law and Society, the Global Metropolitan Studies Program, the Institute of Governmental Studies, and the Center for Ethnographic Research. He is also a research associate at the Centre européen de sociologie et de science politique (CESSP) in Paris and an organizer of the Ethnographic Café.

Wacquant's research has been recognized with several awards. He was elected a Junior Fellow of the Harvard Society of Fellows for the term 1990–1993. In 1997, he was awarded a MacArthur Fellowship. In 2006, he was granted an Alphonse Fletcher Sr. Fellowship. Wacquant won the Lewis A. Coser Award of the Theory Section of the American Sociological Association in 2009.

Wacquant is the only sociologist of note to have competed in the Chicago Golden Gloves amateur boxing tournament. The then 29-year-old 5-foot-8^{1}/_{2} Frenchman, nicknamed "Busy Louie" and weighing in at 137 lbs, suffered a decision loss in a light-welterweight contest at Saint Andrew's Gym in 1990. Wacquant received a standing eight count in the first round.

== Career and education ==
Wacquant was born in Nîmes and grew up near Montpellier in southern France, where, at age four, he lived for a year in the birthhouse of Auguste Comte. A member of an "educated middle-class family", his father was a botanist and his mother a schoolteacher. As a teenager, "prodded" by his father, Wacquant worked summer jobs as an industrial painter, a car mechanic, a farmhand, and a construction worker. After high school in Montpellier, he received his education in economics and sociology in France and the United States: attending the École des hautes études commerciales de Paris (HEC Paris), the Université Paris Nanterre, Washington State University (WSU) in Pullman, Washington, and the University of North Carolina at Chapel Hill. Wacquant was a student and close collaborator of Pierre Bourdieu, whom he met at a public lecture at the École polytechnique in November 1980. Wacquant attended Bourdieu's lectures at the Collège de France and walked home with him at their conclusion. Wacquant has described his walking and talking with Bourdieu through Paris as being like an "accelerated independent study course" and a "fabulous private tutorial for an apprentice sociologist." Wacquant also worked closely with William Julius Wilson at the University of Chicago, where he received his PhD in sociology in 1994. Wacquant has called Wilson the "foremost expert on the nexus of race and class in the United States" and Wilson has called Wacquant a "supremely creative scholar". At Chicago, Wacquant took classes with multiple anthropologists: Marshall Sahlins and Bernard Cohn among them. One of his "course buddies" was David Graeber. Wacquant has remarked that he was "negatively influenced by the Chicago school of sociology" and "positively influenced by the power-and-symbolism-in-history mold of Chicago anthropology".

Jean Baudrillard, whom Wacquant has labelled a "flimflam artist", was one of his examiners at Nanterre.

Wacquant has published more than a hundred articles in journals of sociology, anthropology, urban studies, social theory and philosophy. He is a co-founder and former editor of the interdisciplinary journal Ethnography and a contributor to Le Monde diplomatique and the New Left Review. His research has been conducted in the ghettos of Chicago, the banlieues of Paris, and the prisons of the United States and Brazil. In surveying the relevance of his oeuvre to social work, the University of Salford's Ian Cummins, a qualified probation officer with expertise in mental health, has noted that "Wacquant's work locates him firmly on the progressive Left of the political spectrum." Wacquant is a critic of both major American political parties: regarding them as "little more than labels to facilitate the raising of funds" to pay for election campaigns. Alongside dozens of other intellectuels, including Pierre Rosanvallon, Étienne Balibar, Jacques Bouveresse, and Pierre Macherey, Wacquant advocated a vote for Ségolène Royal, in preference to and against Jean-Marie Le Pen and Nicolas Sarkozy, in the first round of the 2007 French presidential election. Nevertheless, Wacquant, with the journalist Serge Halimi, has criticised the Socialist Party for its "abandonment of working-class voters", the seeming duplicity of Lionel Jospin, and its aping of New Labour. Though he has argued that sociologists "are not in the business of being either optimists or pessimists", Wacquant believes that the social sciences can make a "civic contribution of the first order" through the "methodical critique of the categories and topics which weave the fabric of the dominant discourse" and by revealing "possible alternative paths" or "points of bifurcation in the road of history."

== Research ==
Wacquant's research explores and links together diverse sociological themes. The human body, urban inequality, ghettoization, precarity, and the development of punishment as an institution aimed at poor and stigmatized populations all feature in his work. His interest in these topics received impetus from his experiences as a functionary of the former French Office of Colonial Research (ORSTOM) in New Caledonia, where he fulfilled his mandatory military service during the period 1983–1985, and as a doctoral student at the University of Chicago during the second half of the 1980s. Commenting on what he found in Chicago in the New York Times in 2003, Wacquant said "I had never seen such scenes of desolation. I remember thinking: It's like Beirut. Or Dresden after the war. It was really a shock." Latterly, Wacquant has affirmed that the "nexus of race, class and space" in New Caledonia made it a "fabulous historical laboratory" and prepared him well for the "apartheid-like" sociospatial inequalities that he later encountered in Illinois. Wacquant's intellectual trajectory and interests are explicated and reflected upon in "The Body, the Ghetto and the Penal State" (2009) and "Carnal concepts in action: The diagonal sociology of Loïc Wacquant" (2023).

In the 2001 article "Deadly symbiosis: When ghetto and prison meet and mesh", Wacquant offers a 'middle-range' theory, addressing mass imprisonment, that is mainly relevant to contemporary anti-black racism in the United States. Adapting the distinction drawn by the historian Moses Finley between "societies with slaves" and "genuine slave societies", Wacquant concludes that lower-class African Americans now live in the "first genuine prison society of history." For Wacquant, the "novel organizational compound formed by the vestiges of the ghetto and the expanding carceral system" constitutes the fourth 'peculiar institution' that has "shouldered" the task of drawing and enforcing the 'color line' that "cleaves American society asunder": following, in temporal succession, slavery, Jim Crow, and the post-Great Migration urban ghetto of the Northern or Yankee industrial metropolis. According to Wacquant, the ghetto and the prison are structurally and functionally akin, reinforcing each other, with governmental encouragement, to ensure and perpetuate the socioeconomic marginality and symbolic depreciation of the black subproletariat. As Wacquant would have it, the prison should be viewed as a "judicial ghetto" and the ghetto—especially the post-Fordist class-segregated 'hyperghetto'—as a species of "ethnoracial prison". Taken together, these comprise part of a "carceral continuum" that "ensnares a supernumerary population of younger black men, who either reject or are rejected by the deregulated low-wage labor market, in a never-ending circulus between the two institutions". In the wake of industrial divestment, and in contradistinction to the high twentieth-century "dark ghetto" that functioned as a "reservoir of cheap and pliable labor" for urban manufacturers, the 'hyperghetto', like the prison system, serves the "negative economic function of storage of a surplus population devoid of market utility". One of the most consequential effects of the "wedding of ghetto and prison into an extended carceral mesh", with its concomitant 'hyper-incarceration' of young African American men (during a period of flattening, and subsequently declining, crime rates in which ethnic patterns of criminal activity have not fundamentally changed), Wacquant notes, has been the revivification of racist ideology, the semiotic conflation of blackness with criminality, and the "return of Lombroso-style mythologies about criminal atavism".

In a 2007 conversation with the American novelist Russell Banks, who felt a "great affinity" with his work, Wacquant reiterated several of the points argued in "Deadly symbiosis":

Caught in the deadly pincer formed by the deregulated labor market and the retrenching welfare state, poor blacks are captured by the penal state, which simultaneously perpetuates and justifies their marginalization by presenting it as the product of their personal failings.

...

With the transition from an industrial to a service economy, the ghetto lost its function of economic extraction and its residents were pushed out of the sphere of wage work. The economy of the street replaced the labor market, and social and criminal insecurity diffused everywhere. Then, to manage this population doubly marginalized on the basis of race and class, the state deployed its police and judicial apparatus. Today, America's Gargantuan carceral system holds under lock nearly one million black men. Imprisonment is generally regarded as a remedy for crime—everybody has the 'crime-and-punishment' schema in their heads. But in reality, rolling out the penal system serves primarily to deal with dispossessed and dishonored populations. The prison boom in America is the response that the state gave to the rise of the disorders caused by economic deregulation and by the collapse of the ghetto as an instrument of ethno-racial control.

The historian of the 'ghetto concept' Daniel B. Schwartz suggests that Wacquant "of all sociologists" has been the "most adamant about theorizing the institution from its origins to the present". Wacquant, Schwartz submits, "argues for a more race- than class-based conception" and "reduces the ghetto to 'four constituent elements': stigma, constraint, spatial confinement, and institutional parallelism." In his "A Janus-Faced Institution of Ethnoracial Closure: A Sociological Specification of the Ghetto", the essay upon which Schwartz's epitome of his position is based, Wacquant contends that "ghettoization... is a highly peculiar form of urbanization warped by asymmetric relations of power between ethnoracial groupings: a special form of collective violence concretized in urban space." On Wacquant's account, therefore, "not all dispossessed and dilapidated urban districts are ghettos". Wacquant warns against conceptual inflation and criticises his compatriot Didier Lapeyronnie's use of the "word ghetto as a loose synonym for declining lower-class estates branded as such by journalists and by some of their residents". "Declining white neighborhoods in the deindustrializing cities of the US Midwest and the British Midlands, depressed rural towns of the former East Germany and southern Italy, and the disreputable villas miserias of greater Buenos Aires... are territories of working-class demotion and decomposition", not, like ghettos stricto sensu à la Wacquant are, "ethnic containers dedicated to maintaining an outcast group in a relationship of seclusive subordination." Wacquant maintains that such areas are not "ghettos other than in a purely metaphorical sense, no matter how impoverished and how isolated their residents may be".

Inspired by Bourdieu, Wacquant endeavours to provide a more nuanced analysis of penalty than that provided by a reductively economistic Marxian approach (such as that, for example, apparently pursued by Georg Rusche and Otto Kirschheimer in their Punishment and Social Structure). In Punishing the Poor, Wacquant writes that "we must escape from the narrowly materialist vision of the political economy of punishment to capture the reverberating roles of the criminal justice system as cultural engine and fount of social demarcations, public norms, and moral emotions". Testifying to his interdisciplinary reach, and his sensitivity to the discursive dimensions of social existence, Columbia urbanist Tom Slater comments that Wacquant's "most important contribution to urban studies is his demonstration that ignorance of the role of symbolic structures in the production of marginality in the city"—in short, ignorance of the phenomenon of 'territorial stigmatization'—"means that neighbourhoods are made into the cause of poverty rather than the expression of underlying problems to be addressed."

In his 2004 book Body & Soul: Notebooks of an Apprentice Boxer, described by its author as a "kind of sociological-pugilistic Bildungsroman" and a "scientific experiment", Wacquant attempts to demonstrate the "fruitfulness" of an approach to sociology that takes seriously the "fact that the social agent is before anything else a being of flesh, nerves, and senses... who partakes of the universe that makes him, and that he in turn contributes to making, with every fiber of his body and his heart." Via the results of long-term participant observation, or "observant participation", in the Woodlawn Boys Club boxing gym on the South Side of Chicago—a "gym frequented exclusively by black athletes" at the time of his enrolment—Wacquant dismisses the "false idea", which he alleges to have been "deeply rooted in the American sociology of the relations between racial division and urban marginality since the earliest works of the Chicago School", that the ghetto is a "disorganized" space "characterized by lack, want, and absence". Wacquant denounces popular mainstream conceptions of the "underclass", a term he calls a "bastard neologism". He also explores, through an account of his own experiences as an apprentice boxer at Woodlawn Boys Club, the elaborate process by which the "bodily capital" of practitioners of the "Manly art" of boxing is formed and managed. The "Sweet science of bruising" requires an "extraordinarily efficient relation to the specific capital constituted of one's physical resources", Wacquant records, for the "pugilist's body is at once the tool of his work—an offensive weapon and defensive shield—and the target of his opponent." Wacquant states that Body & Soul "aims to display and demonstrate in the same move the social and sensual logic that informs boxing as a bodily craft in the contemporary black American ghetto." Along similar lines, in response to various interlocutors, Wacquant later announced that Body & Soul, as an empirical outworking of Bourdieu's theory of practice, "is not about sport but about a bodily craft and its practical logics".

Much of the academic reception of Body & Soul has been positive. American sociologist Randall Collins has declared that it is "perhaps the best yet sociology of the body". Gary Alan Fine wrote that it "qualifies as the first sociological classic of reflexive autoethnography." In a 2005 review, Douglas Hartmann of the University of Minnesota praised it as a "dazzling ethnographic journey" and a "virtuoso performance". More critically, the Adlers, Patricia A. and Peter, claimed that though Wacquant had produced a "well-nuanced portrait of a subculture of African American boxers in one American inner city", his "theoretical insight", evidenced throughout the work, was no deeper than that exhibited by other ethnographers and sociologists.

Providing a synoptic overview of Wacquant's body of work, which they assert to be "rich, far-reaching, and much debated", the Danish-based scholars Kristian Nagel Delica and Christian Sandbjerg Hansen conceive of it as being supported and pervaded, in all its apparent multiplicity, by four prominent recurrent features or 'pillars'. Pillar one is "Wacquant's rootedness in a French sociology tradition traceable from Comte, Durkheim, and Mauss to Bourdieu, the mentor". Pillar two is his development of Bourdieu's 'practice of theory', embodied in his "enactive ethnography" and "carnal sociology". Pillar three is his double-sided "political sociology": analysing the "effects of the political productions of population categories" and bringing the tools of social science to bear upon current public debates. In a deliberate echo of Marx, Delica and Hansen write that the fourth pillar of Wacquant's sociology is the "ruthless criticism of everything existing" in academia and beyond.

Sustained critical engagement with Wacquant's Urban Outcasts and Punishing the Poor, from criminological scholars who, largely but not entirely, share his "general orientation", can be found in Criminalisation and Advanced Marginality: Critically exploring the work of Loïc Wacquant (2013).

== Selected publications ==
- Bourdieu, Pierre, and Wacquant, Loïc (1992). An Invitation to Reflexive Sociology. Chicago: The University of Chicago Press.
- Wacquant, Loïc (1999). "Penal 'common sense' comes to Europe – US exports zero tolerance" April 1999 Le Monde diplomatique. (original french version, ita version)
- Wacquant, Loïc (November 1999). Les Prisons de la misere. Paris: Editions Raisons d'agir. ISBN 9782912107077
- Wacquant, Loïc (2001). "Deadly symbiosis: When ghetto and prison meet and mesh". Punishment & Society, 3(1): 95–133.
- Wacquant, Loïc (2004). Body & Soul: Notebooks of an Apprentice Boxer. New York: Oxford University Press. ISBN 0195168356
- Wacquant, Loïc (2005). Pierre Bourdieu and Democratic Politics. Cambridge: Polity Press. ISBN 9780745634876
- Wacquant, Loïc (2008). Urban Outcasts: A Comparative Sociology of Advanced Marginality. Cambridge: Polity Press. ISBN 9780745631240
- Wacquant, Loïc (2009). Punishing the Poor: The Neoliberal Government of Social Insecurity. Durham: Duke University Press. ISBN 9780822344049
- Wacquant, Loïc (2009). Prisons of Poverty (expanded edition). Minneapolis: University of Minnesota Press. ISBN 9780816639007
- Wacquant, Loïc (2009). Deadly Symbiosis: Race and the Rise of Neoliberal Penality. Cambridge: Polity Press. ISBN 0745631223
- Wacquant, Loïc. (2014). "Marginality, ethnicity and penality in the neo-liberal city: an analytic cartography" (PDF). Ethnic and Racial Studies. 37 (10): 1687–1711. doi:10.1080/01419870.2014.931991. S2CID 144879355. Archived from the original (PDF) on 2015-10-10.
- Wacquant, Loïc (2022). Body & Soul: Notebooks of an Apprentice Boxer. Expanded anniversary edition. New York: Oxford University Press. ISBN 978-0190465698
- Wacquant, Loïc (2022). The Invention of the "Underclass": A Study in the Politics of Knowledge. Cambridge: Polity Press. ISBN 978-1509552177
- Wacquant, Loïc (2022). Voyage au pays des boxeurs. Paris: Dominique Carré et La Découverte.
- Wacquant, Loïc (2023). Bourdieu in the City: Challenging Urban Theory. Cambridge: Polity Press.
- Wacquant, Loïc (2023). Misère de l'ethnographie de la misère. Paris: Raisons d'agir Éditions.
- Wacquant, Loïc (2024). Racial Domination. Cambridge: Polity Press.
- Wacquant, Loïc (2024). Jim Crow. Le terrorisme de caste en Amérique. Paris: Raisons d'agir Éditions.
