= Legal dualism =

Legal dualism may refer to:

- Monism and dualism in international law
- Dualism in the application of law versus arbitrary power in the context of a dual state
