= Franz Neumann (political scientist) =

German Marxist activist, political scientist, and lawyer (1900–1954)

- Born: Franz Leopold Neumann; 23 May 1900; Katowice, Silesia, German Empire
- Died: 2 September 1954 (aged 54); Visp, Switzerland
- Spouse: Inge Werner
- Children: Osha Neumann; Michael Neumann

Academic background
- Education: London School of Economics
- Thesis: The Governance of the Rule of Law (1936)
- Doctoral advisor: Harold Laski; Karl Mannheim
- Influences: Otto Bauer; Karl Renner; Hugo Sinzheimer

Academic work
- Discipline: Law; political science
- School or tradition: Frankfurt School; Western Marxism
- Institutions: Institute for Social Research; Columbia University
- Doctoral students: Raul Hilberg; Jeane Kirkpatrick
- Notable works: Behemoth (1942)
- Influenced: Richard Löwenthal; C. Wright Mills; Adam Tooze

Franz Leopold Neumann (23 May 1900 – 2 September 1954) was a German political activist, Western Marxist theorist, and labor lawyer who became a political scientist in exile and is best known for his theoretical analyses of Nazism. He studied in Germany and the United Kingdom, and spent the last phase of his career in the United States, where he worked for the Office of Strategic Services from 1943 to 1945 writing the Secret Reports on Nazi Germany. During the Second World War, Neumann spied for the Soviet Union under the code-name "Ruff". Together with Ernst Fraenkel and Arnold Bergstraesser, Neumann is considered to be among the founders of modern political science in Germany.

== Early life ==
Neumann was born in to a Jewish family on May 23, 1900, in Kattowitz (Katowice), Silesia, German Empire (present-day Poland). As a student, Neumann supported the German revolution of 1918–1919 and joined the Social Democratic Party of Germany (SPD). Neumann was instrumental in organizing the Socialist Students Society in Frankfurt am Main, where in 1918 he met Leo Löwenthal, a future colleague in the Institute for Social Research in New York under Max Horkheimer.

At Breslau (the present-day Wrocław in Poland), Leipzig, Rostock, and Frankfurt am Main, Neumann studied law and earned a doctorate in 1923 with a thesis on method in the theory of punishment. His main aim was to explain the socialist acceptance of liberal individualism in this sphere. In the academic exercise that earned his degree, he did not attempt the sociological study he saw as necessary but addressed preliminary philosophical issues in the neo-Kantian debates of the day; however, his treatment of value philosophy led him to the conclusion that the liberal and socialist arguments were equally valid, and that the socialist deviations from consistency in the matter of punishment was politically justifiable and subject only to political management. This foretold his lifelong reliance on negotiated settlements even if they involved exceptions from theoretical consistency. The goal was to ensure that the effects of such deviations are not cumulative, as he came to conclude about the socialist movement's compromises in the Weimar Republic.

== Labor law and social democracy ==
Neumann was active from 1925 to 1927 as law clerk and assistant of Hugo Sinzheimer, the foremost reformist labor law theorist, who also engaged him as a teacher at the trade union academy affiliated with the University of Frankfurt. Throughout the Weimar years, Neumann's political commitment was to the labor wing of the Social Democratic Party. From 1928 to 1933, he worked in Berlin in partnership with Ernst Fraenkel as an attorney specializing in labor law, representing unions and publishing briefs and articles, and a technical book in this innovative field. In 1932–1933, he became lead attorney for the SPD and published a brief, itself suppressed by the Nazis, against the suppression of the principal Social Democratic newspaper.

In the weeks after the assumption of power by the Nazis, Neumann was warned of his imminent arrest and he fled to England, where he studied under Harold Laski at the London School of Economics, and with the former Frankfurt sociology professor, Karl Mannheim. He earned a second doctorate with a study of the rise and fall of the historical epoch of the rule of law. On Laski's recommendation, Neumann was employed by the University of Frankfurt Institute for Social Research (in exile at Columbia University in New York City after some years in Geneva and Paris) in 1936, initially as administrator and legal advisor, and later as research associate, although he was never as well established in the group led by the director Max Horkheimer, as Friedrich Pollock and Theodor Adorno. He participated in the Institute's debates about Nazism in the New York years. By the time the second edition of Behemoth was published in 1944, he rejected the idea that the Nazis were merely using Jews as scapegoats for the ills of German society. Instead what he called a "spearhead theory" arguing that Nazi antisemitism was a test run leading towards the goal of replacing democratic norms with a totalitarian government. This well-known study of the Nazi regime was written without the scrutiny of review procedures. Neumann played an important part in helping the Institute for Social Research to secure the backing of the American Jewish Committee for its well-known study of antisemitism.

== American exile ==
Neumann achieved his academic reputation among American scholars with the publication of Behemoth: The Structure and Practice of National Socialism in 1942. The thesis is that Nazi rule is a function of struggles among power groups united only by their hatred of the labor movement and that Nazi Germany consequently lacks a state in the sense of the modern political formation oriented to order and predictability. Within this framework, Neumann applied many Marxist tools of analysis to characterize the prime social component in the inner struggle. Behemoth made a major impact on the young sociologist C. Wright Mills. While opinions differed about his theses, his mastery of German sources and rich empirical documentation drew applause from established American political scientists and the book prepared the way for his later university career.

The reception of Behemoth laid the foundation for Neumann's wartime career in Washington, D.C., after the Institute's leadership declared itself financially unable to retain his services. Until the first months of 1943, Neumann served as a part-time consultant to the Board of Economic Warfare, staffing routine studies of trade patterns. He then became deputy head of the Central European Section of the Research and Analysis Branch of the Office of Strategic Services (OSS), amid numerous younger American professors, seconded to Washington for the duration. The position also allowed him to place a number of his Institute associates, who had been made redundant by the core group around Horkheimer. Neumann was instrumental in producing intelligence reports on the Nazis for the OSS, later published in a single volume Secret Reports on Nazi Germany: The Frankfurt School Contribution to the War Effort.

Neumann's friend, Paul Massing, a Soviet spy, reported to Moscow that Neumann had told him that he had produced a study of the Soviet economy for the OSS's Russian Department. In April 1943, Elizabeth Zarubina, a Soviet spy in the United States, and the wife of Vassily Zarubin, met with Neumann. According to Spartacus Educational, "[Zarubina] met for the first time with [Neumann] who promised to pass us all the data coming through his hands. According to [Neumann], he is getting many copies of reports from American ambassadors ... and has access to materials referring to Germany." Neumann's code name was "Ruff". Neumann promised to cooperate fully during his initial meeting with Zarubina, after becoming a naturalized American citizen later that year he appeared to become reluctant to pass secret information. One memorandum sent to Moscow in early January 1944 described a conversation between Neumann and his friends Paul and Hede Massing, in which they "directly asked him about the reasons for his ability to work" and tried to determine whether he had changed his mind. Neumann responded: "I did not change my mind. If there is something really important, I will inform you without hesitation."

Neumann, Herbert Marcuse, and Otto Kirchheimer worked on numerous projects, including the analysis of political tendencies in Germany. They were "specifically assigned to the identification of Nazi and anti-Nazi groups and individuals; the former were to be held accountable in the war crimes adjudication then being negotiated between the four Great Powers, and the latter were to be called upon for cooperation in post-war reconstruction. For his source materials he drew upon official and military intelligence reports, extensive OSS interviews with refugees, and special OSS agents and contacts in occupied Europe; it was his duty to evaluate the reliability of each of the items of intelligence that reached him, and assemble them all into a coherent analysis of points of strength and weakness in the Reich." (Katz, 1980:116). At the end of 1944, Neumann, Marcuse, and Kirchheimer were involved in preparing materials for use by eventual occupation authorities, including a de-Nazification guide. Most of this effort was rendered irrelevant by the priorities of the incipient Cold War policy at the end of the war. Neumann was detached from Washington Service until September 1945 to assist the head of OSS in preparing for the war crimes prosecution. Just before the beginning of the trials, Neumann returned to Washington, to take up a position on the Central European Desk of the Department of State.

== Nuremberg, Berlin, and New York ==
In the service of the Nuremberg Trials under the Chief Prosecutor, Justice Robert H. Jackson, Neumann prepared analyses of the twenty two Nuremberg defendants and of various Nazi organizations. From mid-September 1945, Neumann's team prepared and supervised materials for a series of indictments with other OSS colleagues responsible for both interrogation and document analysis. William Joseph Donovan initially directed Neumann to examine religious persecution other than against Jews under the Nazi regime. The report's analysis of "the problem of establishing criminal responsibility" contributed to the prosecutorial strategy. The thinking was to show that measures taken against the Christian churches were an integral part of Nazi. It also attempted to show that measures were criminal from the standpoint of German or international law, depending where a given act was committed. The report argued that key articles of the Weimar Constitution "were never formally abrogated by the National Socialist regime, … were left untouched and still remain theoretically in force." Furthermore, it said that "respect for the principle of religious freedom" continued to be reiterated in various official policy statements of the Nazi regime, and in various "enactments of the National Socialist state, particularly the Concordat of 20 July 1933."

The material on religious persecution is placed in the wider context of how these agencies committed crimes against humanity as an integral part of the Nazi's master plan, its conspiracy to seize and consolidate ideological control and totalitarian power within Germany by eradicating sources of actual and potential opposition. This material formed part of the evidence on which these agencies were judged to be criminal organisations. Neumann's group wrote,

The Nazi conspirators, by promoting beliefs and practices incompatible with Christian teaching, sought to subvert the influence of the Churches over the people and in particular over the youth of Germany. They avowed their aim to eliminate the Christian Churches in Germany and sought to substitute therefore Nazi institutions and Nazi beliefs and pursued a programme of persecution of priests, clergy and members of monastic orders whom they deemed opposed to their purposes and confiscated Church property.

The emphasis on the persecution of Christian churches rather than on the far more destructive actions against Jews was a matter of strategic and political decision by the four-party prosecution. Neumann also took charge of revising the first draft prosecution brief detailing the personal responsibility of Hermann Göring, the most senior defendant. Neuman believed that German war criminals should be tried before German courts according to Weimar law as an important part of the wider de-Nazification effort.

Like other disillusioned veterans of the Weimar SPD, Neumann hoped for a more radical and more unified labor and socialist movement in the immediate post-war period, but he quickly accepted the view shared among his old party associates in Berlin that the Communist Party of Germany (KPD)'s subservience to the Soviet Union required the SPD to pursue an independent course. No one has ever suggested that there was any connection between the actions that led to his being quite possibly the person mentioned in the well-known Venona Papers as a Soviet "spy" for some months during 1944 and any of his writings or public acts. What evidence there is suggests that at most Neumann found it important for political reasons that had little to do with Soviet designs to give them knowledge of certain events or happenings. At the time, he was especially well informed on possible American dealings with elements in German religious, military, and economic circles who were interested in a separate peace.

In 1948, Neumann became a professor of political science at Columbia University and helped establish the Free University of Berlin. Neumann was highly regarded at Columbia and played a prominent part in attempts by the Rockefeller Foundation to strengthen political theory as a component of political science in American universities. He published several seminal articles arising out of his attempts to develop a democratic theory consonant with modern political and social changes. Although this project remained unfinished, he contributed important studies of the concepts of dictatorship, power and freedom. The study of modern dictatorships, he contended, revealed the dangers to democracy arising from the pervasive anxiety incident to modern society and showed the need, first, to approach the problem of power from the positive standpoint he thought implicit in the tradition of Rousseau (not liberal fears), and, second, to recognize that freedom entailed rational knowledge of social realities and a mental sense of empowerment (what the older moral philosophy called 'active virtue'), as well as a sphere of protected personal, social (communications), and political (status activus) rights. As with Behemoth, the force of Neumann's argument depended as much on the richness and realism of his political diagnoses as on the contestable theses he put forward.

== Death ==
Neumann died in an automobile accident in Visp, Switzerland, on 2 September 1954. His widow, Inge Werner, married his closest friend and intellectual companion, Herbert Marcuse, in 1955. Franz's oldest son, Osha Thomas Neumann, is a retired prominent civil rights attorney in Berkeley, California. Michael Neumann, his younger son, is a logician and radical political philosopher, and is a professor emeritus of philosophy at Trent University in Peterborough, Ontario.

== Selected bibliography ==
=== English ===
- Neumann, Franz Leopold (1936). European Trade Unionism and Politics. League for Industrial Democracy.
- Neumann, Franz Leopold (1939). "Types of Natural Law". Studies in Philosophy and Social Science, vol. 8, n°3. Archived from the original on 17 August 2016.
- Neumann, Franz Leopold (1942). Behemoth: The Structure and Practice of National Socialism, 1933–1944. Oxford University Press.
- Neumann, Franz Leopold (1957). The Democratic and the Authoritarian State: Essays in Political and Legal Theory. Free Press.
- Neumann, Franz Leopold (1986). The Rule of Law: Political Theory and the Legal System in Modern Society. Berg Publishing, Ltd. ISBN 0-907582-36-2.

=== German ===
- Neumann, Franz Leopold (1929). Die politische und soziale Bedeutung der arbeitsgerichtlichen Rechtsprechung. Laub.
- Neumann, Franz Leopold (1931). Tarifrecht auf der Grundlage der Rechtsprechung des Rechsarbeitsgerichts. Allgemeiner Deutscher Gewerkschaftsbund.
- Neumann, Franz Leopold (1931). Tarifrecht auf der Grundlage der Rechtsprechung des Rechsarbeitsgerichts. Allgemeiner Deutscher Gewerkschaftsbund.
- Neumann, Franz Leopold (1932). Koalitionsfreiheit und Reichsverfassung. Die Stellung der Gewerkschaften im Verfassungssystem. Heymann.
- Neumann, Franz Leopold (1935). Die Gewerkschaften in der Demokratie und in der Diktatur. Probleme des Sozialismus. Graphia.
- Neumann, Franz Leopold (1978). Wirtschaft, Staat, Demokratie. Aufsätze 1930–1954. Suhrkamp.
- Neumann, Franz Leopold (1980). Die Herrschaft des Gesetzes. Eine Untersuchung zum Verhältnis von politischer Theorie und Rechtssystem in der Konkurenzgesellschaft. Suhrkamp. (German trans. of the 1936 doctoral dissertation, "The Governance of the Rule of Law: an Investigation into the Relationship between the Political Theories, the Legal System, and the Social Background in the Competitive Society", London School of Economics, 1936)
