= Otto Kirchheimer =

German-American legal scholar

Otto Kirchheimer (German: [ˈkɪʁçhaɪmɐ]; 11 November 1905, Heilbronn – 22 November 1965, Alexandria, Virginia) was a German jurist and political scientist of the Frankfurt School whose work essentially covered the state and its constitution.

Kirchheimer worked as a research analyst at the Office of Strategic Services (OSS), the forerunner of the CIA, starting in World War II and continuing to 1952.

== Biography ==
Kirchheimer attended school in Heilbronn and Heidelberg from 1912 to 1924. He then studied law and sociology at the Ludwig-Maximilians-Universität München, the University of Cologne, the Friedrich Wilhelm University of Berlin, and the University of Bonn. In 1928, he completed his studies with a doctorate (Dr. jur., magna cum laude) at the University of Bonn for a thesis titled Zur Staatslehre des Sozialismus und Bolschewismus (On the State Theory of Socialism and Bolshevism). His doctoral advisor was Carl Schmitt.

From 1930 to 1933, Kirchheimer was an employee of the social democratic journal Die Gesellschaft and lecturer in political science. From 1932 to 1933, he also worked as a lawyer in Berlin.

Kirchheimer had already in his youth a tendency towards socialism. Later, he became a member of the Social Democratic Party of Germany. During the Weimar Republic, the young Kirchheimer came to prominence with sensational analyses of the relationship between social structures and constitutions. His essay from 1930 Weimar und was dann? Entstehung und Gegenwart der Weimarer Verfassung (Weimar and then what? Origin and present of the Weimar Constitution), in which Kirchheimer described the Weimar Constitution as an unsustainable foundation of the state, was widely discussed.

Kirchheimer was together with Ernst Fraenkel and Franz Leopold Neumann close to Carl Schmitt. In 1932 Kirchheimer published an essay entitled Legalität und Legitimität (Legality and Legitimacy) in the socialist journal Die Gesellschaft (Die Gesellschaft, Band 2, Heft 7, 1932). Carl Schmitt adopted this title for a famous essay of the same name. He explicitly referred to Kirchheimer. Schmitt had also repeatedly quoted him elsewhere.

After the Nazi seizure of power in 1933, Kirchheimer immigrated to Paris in 1934. Here he worked for four years as a researcher in the Institute for Social Research. He began working with Georg Rusche on Sozialstruktur und Strafvollzug (Punishment and Social Structure). The Rusche-Kirchheimer version of Punishment and Social Structure was published in 1939 as the first English-language publication of the institute. In the meantime Kirchheimer had broken off contact with his teacher and mentor Carl Schmitt, who had risen to become the "crown lawyer of the Third Reich".

On 11 November 1937, Kirchheimer immigrated to the United States with his wife Hilde Kirchheimer and his daughter Hanna (born in 1930). On December 6, 1938, his German citizenship and that of his wife Hilde and daughter Hanna was officially revoked. However, the marriage was ended by divorce on May 8, 1941, in Tlaxcala, Mexico. In New York, Kirchheimer continued from 1937 to 1942 his work for the Institute of Social Research as a research assistant in law and social sciences. At the same time, he was a lecturer at Columbia University.

In 1943, Kirchheimer moved with his second wife, Anne Rosenthal, to Washington, D.C., where their son Peter was born in 1945. He initially worked part-time for a year (1943 to 1944), then full-time from 1944 to 1952 as a research analyst in the Research and Analysis Branch of the U.S. Office of Strategic Services (OSS), the forerunner of the CIA. His intelligence reports were later republished in Secret Reports on Nazi Germany: The Frankfurt School Contribution to the War Effort. On 16 November 1943 Kirchheimer received American citizenship. He was a visiting lecturer in sociology at Wellesley College (1943). He also worked as a lecturer at the American University (1951 to 1952) and at Howard University (1952 to 1954). From 1952 to 1956 Otto Kirchheimer was head of the Central Europe Section in the State Department. Kirchheimer left the OSS and accepted a visiting professorship at the Graduate Faculty of the New School for Social Research (1954). The next year he became full professor of Political Science there (until 1961). Here he wrote his book Political Justice. The Use of Legal Procedures for Political Ends, which was completed in 1961. From 1960 to 1965 Kirchheimer was Professor of Political Science at Columbia University. From 1961 to 1962 he was also Fulbright Professor at the University of Freiburg.

On 22 November 1965 Kirchheimer died of a heart attack while trying to board a plane at Dulles International Airport near Alexandria, Virginia and Washington, D.C. He was buried at the Jewish cemetery in Heilbronn on January 18, 1966.

== Research ==
Kirchheimer's multifaceted academic work reflects in an almost unique way the political and scientific experiences and conflicts of the Weimar Republic, National Socialism, French and American exile, and the founding and establishment phase of the two new German states of East Germany and West Germany that emerged after 1945. Kirchheimer's contributions mostly arose out of concrete events, which, however, do not remain thematically isolated but contain elements of a comprehensive theory of modern statehood, democracy, the rule of law, modern administration and intermediary organizations.

Kirchheimer began his publishing activities as a young socialist during the Weimar Republic. The focus of his work was the relationship between the constitution and social structure, as well as the analysis of social power relations and their impact on constitutional law. Using various examples, he examined the tension between political "legal order" and economic "power order". Kirchheimer shared with Carl Schmitt the rejection of parliamentarism and the criticism of pluralism. Kirchheimer is therefore also counted as part of "left-wing Schmittianism". For Kirchheimer and Schmitt, a parliamentary consensus in the class state was in principle impossible. For both, the majority system was bound to the precondition of homogeneity, because otherwise it was not the parliament that decided on politics, but economic power complexes. Kirchheimer regarded the Weimar Constitution only as an outdated legal mechanism that would inevitably have to fail due to the real balance of power.

After the National Socialists seized power, the focus of Kirchheimer's work shifted to the analysis of "German fascism". In doing so, Kirchheimer expressly opposed the thesis of the Doppelstaat (dual state), which his comrade-in-arms from the Weimar days, Ernst Fraenkel, had put forward. He also opposed the view of the Frankfurt School (Horkheimer, Adorno), according to which the National Socialists had transformed monopoly capitalism into state capitalism. Similar to Franz Neumann's Behemoth. Struktur und Praxis des Nationalsozialismus 1933–1944, Kirchheimer claimed politics is determined by the power struggle between different power groups. As with Neumann, Kirchheimer too asserted there can be no structurally unified state authority under National Socialism; the Third Reich thus appeared as a "non-state". According to Kirchheimer (again in Schmittian thinking) the social groups take possession of the state and its functions, which they divide among themselves. This would result in a coexistence and opposition of different power complexes, in which the question of binding decision-making authority would remain open or, in Schmitt, tend towards executive authority.

He is father of the concept of a "catch-all party (Allerweltspartei)". Otto Kirchheimer's conception of the catch-all party was part of his more comprehensive theory of party transformation, encompassing four interrelated political processes. By tracing the development of the catch-all thesis and placing it within the wider context of Kirchheimer's complete work, it is possible to reconstruct a more precise understanding of what Kirchheimer meant by the catch-all concept, which itself remains highly contested. Kirchheimer's anxiety about modern democracy originated with what he saw as the vanishing of principled opposition within parliament and society, and the reduction of politics to the mere management of the state. This leads to collusion of political parties and the state, severing of the societal links of party organisations, and erosion of the classic separation of powers. Vanishing opposition, cartelisation and professionalisation of politics pits citizens against a powerful state, which increases political cynicism and apathy. Kirchheimer's comprehensive approach remains relevant for much of the contemporary debate about the transformation of Western political systems.

The German Research Fund (Deutsche Forschungsgemeinschaft, DFG) is funding the research and editorial work for an edition in five volumes of the Gesammelte Schriften (Collected Writings) of Otto Kirchheimer. The project began in late 2015 at the University of Greifswald, and the sixth and final volume was published in 2022.

== Works ==
- Punishment and Social Structure (1939) (with Georg Rusche).
- Political Justice. The Use of Legal Procedure for Political Ends. Princeton University Press, Princeton 1961.
- Politics, Law and Social Change. Selected Essays of Otto Kirchheimer. New York, London 1969.
- Gesammelte Schriften (Collected Writings), 6 vols., Nomos, Baden-Baden 2022.
