= Punishment and Social Structure =

Book by Georg Rusche and Otto Kitchheimer

Punishment and Social Structure (1939), a book written by Georg Rusche and Otto Kirchheimer, is the seminal Marxian analysis of punishment as a social institution. It represents the "most sustained and comprehensive account of punishment to have emerged from within the Marxist tradition" and "succeeds in opening up a whole vista of understanding which simply did not exist before it was written" (Garland 1990: 89, 110). It is a central text in radical criminology and an influential work in criminological conflict theory, cited as a foundation text in several major textbooks (Oxford Handbook of Criminology 2007; Newburn 2007; Innes 2003). It offers a broader (macrosociological) level of analysis than many micro-analyses that focus on the atomized and differentiated individual (Jacobs 1977: 91).

The work is extensively cited by both critical theorists and radical criminologists (Garland and Young 1983: 7, 24), and has influenced seminal works in the sociology of imprisonment, being cited in, for example, modern classics such as James B. Jacobs's Stateville (1977: 91), Michel Foucault's Discipline and Punish (1977:24), and Punishing the Poor (2009: 206) by Loïc Wacquant. The work represented a decisive step forward in the development of the criminological imagination regarding punishment, one that places it in significance "alongside Durkheim's theory of punishment" (Garland 1990: 110). As such, the work has been extensively deployed by eminent criminologists and sociologists as a critical lens to understand and explain contemporary phenomena such as mass imprisonment (Zimring and Hawkins 1993: 33), and there has been a significant revival of critical interest in the work. It is regarded as a "classic", if frequently contested, text in the sociology of punishment and criminology more generally (Melossi 1978: 79, 81).

== Background ==
The origins of the book are complex and controversial. Rusche and Kirchheimer were exiles from Nazi Germany (Rusche had a Jewish mother and considered his origins 'mixed' (Melossi 2003: x); Kirchheimer was Jewish). Rusche fled to the United Kingdom, then to Palestine, and thence back to the United Kingdom, where he was interned as an enemy alien after the outbreak of war. Kirchheimer originally left for Paris.

They were part of a dispersed cohort of émigré German social scientists, many of whom had been associated with the International Institute of Social Research in Frankfurt am Main (also known as the Frankfurt Institute). This Institute, established in 1923, was closed by the German government in 1933, the year of the Nazi takeover. It transferred to Columbia University, New York, and many of the émigré scholars pursued their critical analyses of society there (Horkheimer 1938: ix).

The book Punishment and Social Structure originated in an article suggested by Rusche in 1931, that is, before leaving Germany. The article was ultimately delivered in 1933 and entitled Labour Market and Penal Sanction: Thoughts on the Sociology of Criminal Justice. It was felt by leading American sociologists/criminologists, Thorsten Sellin and Edwin Sutherland, that the pivotal importance of the topic merited more extensive treatment than Rusche's article provided, for all its intrinsic conceptual originality (Melossi 2003: xiii).

At this point, famously, Rusche was 'not available' (Horkheimer 1938: x). The meaning of this euphemistic phrase in the book's preface remains contested. It is beyond dispute that Rusche was a controversial and erratic figure, leaving a trail of intrigue in his wake in his itinerant life after Germany (Melossi 2003: xiv-xx). This is how it came about that Kirchheimer was commissioned to rework and develop Rusche’s text, adding his own analysis, in particular concerning penal policy under fascism, while retaining the bulk of the concepts found in Rusche’s original draft. The reconfigured work became the first book published by the newly constituted Institute.

== Central argument ==
In its barest essentials Rusche and Kirchheimer propound a structuralist analysis of punishment, arguing that modes of punishment are social phenomena shaped by economic drivers (p5 - stand-alone page references relate to the 1968 edition). The concretized forms of punishment actually found correspond, they maintain, to the prevailing means of production. It is here that the Marxian stance of privileging the economic base is evident. This leads to the renowned claim that 'Punishment as such does not exist; only concrete systems of punishment and specific criminal practices exist. The object of our investigation, therefore, is punishment in its specific manifestations' (ibid.).

The books surveys the historic development of these 'specific manifestations', dividing the progression of punishment into three conceptual epochs: the early Middle Ages, which utilized penance and fines; the late Middle Ages, when sanctions became markedly more barbarous, including branding, mutilation, torture and execution; and then the coming of capitalism, where forms of punishment came to perceive the prisoner as a source of human labour, including galley slavery, transportation and penal servitude with hard labour. As the Enlightenment and the Modern period developed, prisons became more prominent.

Overall the authors hold that punishment is a species of class domination. It must be viewed as part of an intricate matrix of social control and 'not an isolated phenomenon subject only to its own special laws. It is an integral part of the whole social system, and shares its aspirations and its defects' (p. 207). It operates to enforce ruling class power. This point was forcefully made by Rusche in his 1933 essay: 'the criminal law and the daily work of the criminal courts are directed almost exclusively against those people whose class background, poverty, neglected education, or demoralization drove them to crime' (Rusche 1933: 11).

The authors argue that such class-skewed punishment provides only 'the illusion of security by covering the symptoms of social disease with a system of legal and moral value judgements' (p. 207). They conclude that although the futility of severe punishment and cruel treatment may be proven 'a thousand times ... so long as society is unable to solve its social problems, repression, the easy way out, will always be accepted' (ibid.).

=== Critical reception ===
Following its publication in 1939, the book received little critical attention (Garland 1990: 106). In the late 1960s, however, the book's analytical stance and Marxian bent resonated with the developing school of critical criminology and its radical outlook. It generated considerable interest in the economic underpinning to the concept of punishment, and was effectively updated and reapplied in works such as Melossi and Pavarini's The Prison and the Factory (1981). The book has also been subjected to significant criticism, with commentators questioning its reductionist Marxian stance, with its overstatement of the influence of economic factors (Garland 1990: 108), the deterministic nature of the conclusions generated, the teleological problems inherent in the theme of punishment as a 'project' of the ruling class to reinforce its domination, and the book's vulnerability to various historical inexactitudes (Beattie 1986).

These qualifications notwithstanding, Punishment and Social Structure remains at the forefront of theoretical and analytical expositions of how if we are to understand punishment, we must be attentive to the dictates of social class and broader patterns of social domination and control. Its persuasive force lies in providing the clarity of a lens to view how punishment lies within 'much wider strategies for managing the poor and the lower classes' (Garland 1990: 110).

== Sources ==
- Beattie, J. (1986) Crime and the Courts in England, 1660–1800.
- Garland, D. (1990) Punishment and Modern Society. Chicago, IL: University of Chicago Press.
- Garland, D. and J. Young (1983) The Power to Punish: Contemporary Penality and Social Analysis.
- Foucault, M. (1975) Discipline and Punish.
- Horkheimer, M. (1938) Preface to Punishment and Social Structure.
- Innes, M. (2003) Understanding Social Control.
- Jacobs, J. (1977) Stateville: The Penitentiary in Mass Society.
- Maguire, M., R. Morgan and R. Reiner (2007) Oxford Handbook of Criminology (4th edn.). Oxford: Oxford University Press.
- Melossi, D. (1978) 'Georg Rusche and Otto Kirchheimer: Punishment and Social Structure', Crime and Social Justice 9.
- Melossi, D. (2003) Introduction to the Transaction Edition of Punishment and Social Structure.
- Melossi, D. and M. Pavarini (1981) The Prison and the Factory: the Origins of the Penitentiary System.
- Newburn, T. (2007) Criminology.
- Rusche, G. (1933) Labour Market and Penal Sanction: Thoughts on the Sociology of Criminal Justice.
- Rusche, G. and O. Kirchheimer (1939) Punishment and Social Structure. Columbia University Press (edn.) (1968).
- Spitzer, S. (1994) Toward a Marxian Theory of Deviance, in S. Traub and C. Little (Eds.) Theories of Deviance (10th edn.). Itasca, IL: F. E. Peacock Publishers, Inc.
- Wacquant, L. (2009) Punishing the Poor: The Neoliberal Government of Social Insecurity. Durham: Duke University Press.
- Zimring, F. and G. Hawkins (1993) The Scale of Imprisonment.
