= Secret Reports on Nazi Germany =

Book collecting OSS reports on Nazi Germany

- Authors: Franz Neumann, Herbert Marcuse, Otto Kirchheimer
- Language: English
- Subjects: Nazi Germany, World War II
- Publisher: Princeton University Press
- Publication date: 2013
- Publication place: United States
- Media type: Print (Hardcover)
- Pages: 680
- ISBN: 9780691134130

Secret Reports on Nazi Germany: The Frankfurt School Contribution to the War Effort is a book composed of the original Office of Strategic Services reports on Nazi Germany prepared primarily by Franz Neumann, Herbert Marcuse, and Otto Kirchheimer, who had all been part of the original Frankfurt School of critical theory.

Neumann, Marcuse, and Kirchheimer produced the intelligence reports that constitute the volume while working for the European Section of the Research and Analysis Branch of the OSS. The files were declassified between 1975 and 1976. The texts were originally written in English.

Some of the materials produced for the OSS project were used by the scholars elsewhere—for instance, Marcuse's The Social Democratic Party of Germany, Dissolution of the Nazi Party and Its Affiliated Organizations, and Policy Towards the Revival of Old Parties and Establishment of New Parties in Germany appear to have been written for an academic position, and were separately published in Technology, War and Fascism.

Scholars have described the volume as "a highly valuable source for anyone interested in intellectual history, the history of ideas, the history of the Second World War, Nazi Germany or wartime intelligence" that will remain "essential reading material for anyone dealing with the so-called Frankfurt School."

== Organisation of work ==
The book consists of seven parts:

=== Part I: The Analysis of the Enemy ===
This examines antisemitism, Reich politics, and the legacy of Prussian militarism.

1. Anti-Semitism: Spearhead of Universal Teror: (18 May, 1943), Franz Neumann
2. Possible Political Changes in Nazi Germany in the Near Future: (10 August,1943), Herbert Marcuse
3. Changes in the Reich Government: (20 August, 1943), Herbert Marcuse
4. Speer’s Appointment as Dictator of the German Economy: (13 September,1943) Franz Neumann and Paul Sweezy
5. The Significance of Prussian Militarism for Nazi Imperialism: Potential Tensions in United Nations Psychological Warfare: (20 October,1943), Herbert Marcuse and Felix Gilbert
6. German Social Stratification: (26 November, 1943) Herbert Marcuse

=== Part II, Patterns of Collapse ===
This examines Nazi morale, the possibility of a governmental collapse, the impact of Allied air raids, and attempts on Hitler's life.

7. German Morale After Tunisia: (25 June,1943), Franz Neumann
8. Morale in Germany: (16 September,1943), Herbert Marcuse, Franz Neumann, and Hans Meyerhoff
9. Possible Patterns of German Collapse: (21 September, 1943), Franz Neumann, Herbert Marcuse and Felix Gilbert
10. The Social and Political Effects of Air Raids on the German People: A Preliminary Survey: (9 June, 1944), Franz Neumann
11. The Attempt on Hitler’s Life and its Consequences: (27 July, 1944), Franz Neumann

=== Part III: Political Opposition ===
This deals with internal opposition in the Reich.

12. The Free Germany Manifesto and the German People: (6 August, 1943) Franz Neumann
13. The German Communist Party: (10 July, 1944), Herbert Marcuse
14. The Social Democratic Party of Germany: (1 September, 1945), Herbert Marcuse

=== Part IV: Denazification and Military Government ===
This analyzes a range of political, economic, legal and administrative problems facing the Nazis.

15. The Abrogation of Nazi Laws in the Early Period of Military Government: (n.d., end of March 1944?) Otto Kirchheimer
16. Dissolution of the Nazi Party and its Affiliated Organizations: (22 July, 1944), Herbert Marcuse
17. German Cartels and Cartel-Like Organizations: (n.d.) Franz Neumann
18. Policy Toward Revival of Old Parties and Establishment of New Parties in Germany: (22 July, 1944), Herbert Marcuse
19. General Principles of Administration and Civil Service in Germany: (22 July, 1944), Otto Kirchheimer
20. Administration of German Criminal Justice Under Military Government: (29 July, 1944) Otto Kirchheimer
21. The Problem of Inflation in Germany: (16 October,1944) Franz Neumann

=== Part V: A New Germany in New Europe ===
This focuses on the German economy.

22. The Adaptation of Centralized European Controls of Raw Materials, Industry, and Transport: (30 October, 1943), Franz Neumann and Paul Sweezy
23. The Revival of German Political and Constitutional Life Under Military Government: (18 September, 1944), Franz Neumann
24. The Treatment of Germany: (October 11, 1944), Franz Neumann

=== Part VI: Toward Nuremberg ===
This examines the crimes of the Nazi regime, the treatment of war criminals, and Nazi ideology.

25. The “Statement on Atrocities” of the Moscow Tripartite Conference: (10 December, 1943), Otto Kirchheimer
26. Problems Concerning the Treatment of War Criminals: (September 25,1944), Franz Neumann
27. Leadership Principle and Criminal Responsibility: (18 July, 1945) Otto Kirchheimer
28. Nazi Plans for Dominating Germany and Europe: The Nazi Master Plan: (7 August, 1945), Herbert Marcuse
29. Nazi Plans for Dominating Germany and Europe: Domestic Crimes: (13 August, 1945), Otto Kirchheimer

=== Part VII: A New Enemy ===
This examines communism and German trade unions.

30. Status and Prospects of German Trade-Unions and Works Councils: (May 27, 1946), Herbert Marcuse
31. The Potentials of World Communism: (1 August,1949), Herbert Marcuse
