= The Dual State =

Non-fiction book by Ernst Fraenkel

The Dual State: A Contribution to the Theory of Dictatorship (German: Der Doppelstaat) is a German-language and English-language non-fiction book by lawyer and political scientist Ernst Fraenkel.

E. A. Shils was the translator of the English version, which was published by Oxford University Press in 1941. Shils worked with Edith Loewenstein and Klaus Knorr. It was re- translated into German in the 1970s, with the first German-language version published in 1974.

== Premise ==
The book describes how, in the courts of Nazi Germany, people opposed to the government faced a lack of legal protection, while other groups were given legal protections. Fraenkel called the first the "Prerogative State" and the second the "Normative State". He described the entire system as the "Dual State".

== Background ==
Fraenkel took a document, written in German and titled Urdoppelstadt, in which he outlined how the Nazi legal system works, and left Germany with it in 1938. Fraenkel had violated the laws of the Nazi state by writing the work. He finished the work on June 15, 1940. Fraenkel did not keep the final revision but only the first draft, because he believed that the work would never be able to be given a German language publication. Fraenkel stated that he felt "affektionswert" towards the initial draft. When it became time that a German version would be viable, Fraenkel had the English language work retranslated into German. The work was published in German in 1974.

According to reviewer Lawrence Preuss, the translation was the first English language that analyzes the Nazi legal system's operations and legal theories.

== Reception ==
Reviewer Taylor Cole wrote that the book is "a real contribution to the literature on the Third Reich."

In October 2025, Pema Levy of Mother Jones stated that "Fraenkel’s work has seen a resurgence of interest in the United States in recent months".

== See also ==
- Behemoth: The Structure and Practice of National Socialism
