= Arnold Bergstraesser =

German political scientist (1896–1964)

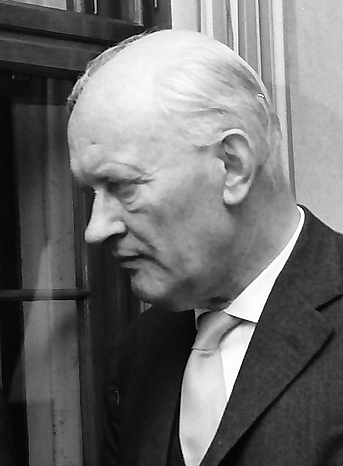
Bergstraesser in 1962

Arnold Bergstraesser (14 July 1896, Darmstadt – 24 February 1964, Freiburg im Breisgau) was a German political scientist. Along with Wolfgang Abendroth, Karl Dietrich Bracher, Theodor Eschenburg, and Eric Voegelin, he was one of the founders of political science in West Germany after World War II.

== Biography ==
Bergstraesser was a founding member of the German Academic Exchange Service in 1925. He received his doctorate from Heidelberg University in 1923 and earned his habilitation in 1928. He fled Germany in 1937, as his university service at Heidelberg was terminated due to his family's Jewish origins.

He taught until 1954 at several American universities including the University of Chicago, where Georg Iggers was among his students. He returned to Germany accepting a professorship in Political Science at the Ludwig-Maximilians-Universität München, before he changed to a professorship in Sociology and Political Science at the University of Freiburg in 1954. He is the founder of the Arnold Bergstraesser Institute for transregional research and comparative area studies in Freiburg im Breisgau.
