= Hilde Neumann =

German lawyer (1905–1959)

- Born: Hilde Martha Betty Rosenfeld; 13 August 1905; Berlin, Germany
- Died: 11 September 1959 (aged 54); Berlin, East Germany
- Occupations: Lawyer; Political activist Government law officer
- Political party: KPD (1936); SED (1947)
- Spouse(s): 1. Otto Kirchheimer 1928; 2. Rudolf Neumann 1941
- Children: 2
- Parent(s): Kurt Rosenfeld (1877–1943); Alice Kristeller/Rosenfeld (1878-1948)

Hilde Neumann (born Hilde Martha Betty Rosenfeld: 13 April 1905, in Berlin-Karlshorst – 11 September 1959, in Berlin) was a German lawyer.

She was politically leftwing and of Jewish provenance: she spent the Nazi years in exile. In 1947 she returned to Berlin and resumed her political focus, becoming a senior legal official in the Socialist Unity Party (Sozialistische Einheitspartei Deutschlands / SED), which by 1949 had become the ruling party of the German Democratic Republic (East Germany) which was formally established in October of that year. She also served as editor in chief of "Neue Justiz", an East German monthly specialist journal concerned with legal matters.

== Life ==
=== Provenance and early years ===
Hilde Rosenfeld was born into a Jewish family in Berlin. Her father was the lawyer and SPD Reichstag (Parliament) member Kurt Rosenfeld (1877–1943). She attended a "Realgymnasium" (academic secondary school) in Berlin before going on to study Jurisprudence at universities in Berlin, Freiburg i/B and Bonn, concluding her studies with a doctorate. At all three of the universities she attended she was a member of a Marxist student group.

=== Growing up in Weimar Germany ===
In 1925 she joined the Social Democratic Party in Berlin-Wilmersdorf. She worked as a referendary (articled clerk / trainee lawyer) in Erfurt and Berlin. On 31 March 1928 Hilde Rosenfeld married the fellow lawyer, Otto Kirchheimer. Their daughter, Hanna, was born in Berlin on December 16, 1930 and they separated in 1931. In 1932 Hilde passed the Second level national law exam which entitled her to work as a lawyer, and she joined her father's legal practice. She defended high-profile communists including Ernst Thälmann and Georgi Dimitroff.

=== Nazi Germany and exile ===
The Nazis took power in January 1933 and lost little time in converting the German state into a one-party dictatorship. Political activity (unless in support of the Nazi party) became illegal. Both her Jewishness and her increasingly immoderate politics made Hilde Kirchheimer vulnerable to the methods of the post-democratic German state, and as the arrests started she lost her permit to work in her profession and emigrated, in April 1933, to Paris. The French capital was rapidly becoming the de facto headquarters of the German Communist Party in exile. Her younger brother Fredi, still in Berlin-Wilmersdorf, committed suicide early in February 1934. One of Hilde Kirchheimer's projects in Paris was her participation in producing the so-called Brown Book which, in its 1933 version, set out to chronicle the events surrounding the Reichstag Fire and the ensuing Nazi Terror which the fire was used to justify. At this time she met Denis Pritt, head of the "International Commission of Enquiry for Enlightenment about the Reichstag Fire", which was a London-based "alternative enquiry" set up as a response to the official "Reichstag Fire Trial" conducted in Leipzig by the government. During 1935/36, at the invitation of the Workers International Relief organisation, Hilde Kirchheimer made a study of the Soviet justice system, and in 1936 she belatedly became a member of the German Communist Party. Her husband, from whom she had already been separated for several years, emigrated to the United States in November 1937, probably with their daughter, Hanna: Hilde remained in Paris, working for International Red Aid till 1939.

War was declared by the French government in September 1939 and the Germany army overran northern France in May/June 1940. Between these two events Hilde Kirchheimer found herself identified as an enemy alien and interned for approximately a month in the concentration camp at Rieucros, close to the border with Spain. Later that year she was able to emigrate to the United States with Rudolf Neumann. Neumann, like her brother, had qualified as a medical doctor. Hilde and Otto Kirchheimer were finally divorced on May 8, 1941, in Tlaxcala, Mexico. Marriage to Rudolf Neumann followed and they had one daughter together Erika born on May 21, 1943, in Mexico City. For the next six years the Neumanns made their life together in Mexico. In Mexico Hilde Neumann became a member of the pro-Soviet Movement for a Free Germany (Bewegung Freies Deutschland). From June 1944 she was also a member of the executive of the Heinrich Heine Club, an organization intended to provide a cultural focus for the many German political exiles who had ended up in Mexico. She was also providing contributions to the "Demokratische Post" German language newspaper that was produced in Mexico during this period.

=== Soviet occupation zone ===
Early in 1947 Hilde Neumann returned to what remained of Germany, where a large area of the country surrounding Berlin was now being administered as the Soviet occupation zone. She joined the newly formed Socialist Unity Party (Sozialistische Einheitspartei Deutschlands / SED) and the Democratic Women's League (Demokratischer Frauenbund Deutschlands / DFD), one of the political mass organisations being created under the ultimate control of the SED in compliance with the elaborately crafted Leninist power structure mandated by the occupation zone's Soviet sponsors.

=== German Democratic Republic ===
Hilde Neumann took on several of the tasks involved in creating an appropriate justice system for the new state which was launched, in October 1949, as the German Democratic Republic (East Germany), which in many ways, together with Hilde Benjamin, she designed. In 1948/49 she took over the deputy leadership of the "Justice" department of the powerful Party National Executive (Zentral Vorstand). She was also in charge of the report on "Recreation and training for the Court system" ("Gerichtsaufbau und Schulung"). From 1948 she was teaching at the party's Karl Marx Academy. Between 1949 and 1950 she was president of the Berlin (Soviet sector) regional court, being the first woman to hold this post.

In 1950 she was appointed Berlin's "Director for Justice", a position she held during the critical years till 1953, and one which enabled her to play a central role in the prosecution of Nazis. In 1953 she was appointed Party secretary of the "International Committee of Democratic Jurists", an organization on which she worked with the Pro-Soviet London lawyer Denis Pritt. She was for many years the secretary to the "German League of Democratic Jurists" ("Vereinigung Demokratischer Juristen Deutschlands"), founded in 1949. In addition, between November 1953 and July 1959 she was editor in chief of the professional journal, "Neue Justiz".

== Awards and honours ==
On 7 October 1958 Hilde Neumann received the Patriotic Order of Merit in bronze. The next year, om 9 September, it was announced that she had been awarded the Banner of Labor. However, she had by t4his stage become seriously ill, and she died on 11 September 1959 without being able to receive the award.
