= Patricia A. Adler =

American sociologist

Patricia A. Adler is an American educator and sociologist who is currently a professor emerita at the University of Colorado at Boulder.

== Education ==
Patricia A. Adler earned an A.B. in Sociology in 1973 from the Washington University in St. Louis. Adler continued her studies at the University of Chicago where she received a M.A. in Social Science in 1974. Additionally, Adler received a M.A. in sociology in 1975, and a Ph.D. in 1984 from the University of California, San Diego.

== Career ==
Patricia A. Adler is the professor and Associate Chair for Undergraduate Sociology Program at the University of Colorado. Adler has researched and authored numerous articles and books, including many co-authored with her husband Peter Adler.

== Works ==
=== Researching Dealers and Smugglers ===
Information on upper level drug smugglers and dealers is sparse due to the fact that it is so difficult for sociological researchers to get close to them. The only way for Adler to get close and gather information was to become a participant. Adler's different goals and values came before her becoming a complete participant in the subculture. Her fears also prevented her from becoming actively involved in the trafficking activities which took place. Through Adler assuming a "peripheral" participant role, she became a participant of the smugglers' and dealers' social circles and was involved in their daily activities.

Adler and her husband, Peter, moved to California during the summer of 1974 so Adler could attend graduate school in sociology. One of the first people Adler and Peter met was their neighbor, from whom they were able to purchase marijuana, as well as smoke with him. The neighbor also began to treat them to a regular supply of cocaine, which the couple could not afford on their student budget. While the neighbor always had a steady supply of cocaine and marijuana, he appeared not to know the current price of a small bag of marijuana. Adler and Peter began to notice that their neighbor did not appear to go to work and always had people over, who appeared to be wealthy, coming and going at all hours of the day and night. Some associates of the neighbor let it slip one night that he was part of a smuggling ring that brought in a ton of marijuana a week and 40 kilos of cocaine every few months. Adler and Peter asked their neighbor and some of his closest friends, also becoming their friends, if they could conduct a study and have them be involved. The neighbor and friends were assured of their anonymity, confidentiality, and harmlessness of their work, and they were more than happy to participate and help with Adler's and Peter's careers; the neighbor and friends reveled in the attention they were getting.

Their study began by conducting in-depth interviews, which were open-ended and unstructured, with their neighbor and the other participants. The interviews were taped and Adler asked questions about topics such as their backgrounds, how they got recruited into smuggling and dealing, what stage of dealing they were, their relationships with others, what their motives were, what kind of lifestyle they lived, and their general thoughts of the community in which they lived. Through their friendships with their informants, Adler and Peter were able to expand their circle of contacts. Alder and Peter continued to conduct interviews with their informants up until 1980, the year they moved out of the area.

There are some problems and issues with this study. Adler identified the effects of the drugs on the data-gathering process, the risks she and her husband took while conducting the study, the cultural clash between themselves and their participants, and ethical issues. The informants whom used cocaine were more open and talkative than those whom used marijuana. Adler and Peter placed themselves into dangerous situations and became fearful of the police, not just for themselves but for their informants, as well. They had to protect their interview tapes at times, and even risked arrest due to their own violations of the law. It became a struggle not to point out failure or offer advice to the dealers and smugglers. The ethical issues Adler and Peter struggled with were feelings of guilt and the burden of confidences and intimacies. Adler and Peter felt guilty about their covert research roles and their efforts to manipulate people, such as performing small favors in exchange for research help.

=== Drug Trafficker Reintegration ===
Adler conducted a follow-up to her Wheeling and Dealing research, in which she followed upper level drug dealers and smugglers in the 1970s. In earlier writings, Adler described their criminal careers, attempts, which were often temporary and unsuccessful, to leave the drug world after years of trafficking, and the ways they found to make a living for themselves. In 1991, the ten informants she was able to find from her original sample were all involved in other things. These individuals were affected by their years of trafficking but were otherwise reintegrated into mainstream society to varying degrees.

Despite the small number, this sample presents a good representation of the original group. Adler offers several reasons for this. The first reason is that the follow-up participants are exclusively drawn from members of the core group. The second reason is that these original core members represent the full range of dealing styles. These styles include: failures and successes, organizers and independent operators, aggressive and causal, and brief involvement to more long-term involvement. The third and final reason offered by Adler is that this new sample has good diversity in regards to gender. Of the ten follow-up participants, seven were men and three were women, including a wife of one of the men; she had not been a dealer.

Adler's original informant, her neighbor, had turned from smuggling and dealing to selling wares at flea markets and county fairs, before turning to importation of legitimate goods, mostly clothing, from Mexicans; he had met these individuals during his time dealing. During this time, he lived on the road for months at a time, buying old beat-up vans and traveling all over the country with his products. The neighbor eventually opened, under assumed names, several surf stores; each store went bankrupt. Unfortunately, he never became as financially successful as he had been when he was dealing; he was not able to find an equally in demand product and his business practices were careless and failed to improve.

The neighbor was not a party animal by any means at this point. His body was not able to tolerate the effect of cocaine any longer. He was completely out of the drug business. He was tired and bored; nearly everyone he had been friends with had been cocaine users of one type or another. Four other participants Adler was able to track down were also out of the drug business. Two others ended up "hustling for a living," never being able to hold legitimate work.

Adler's follow up revealed that all ten of the sample participants were out of the drug business and involved in other ventures and work. Not all of their attempts to leave were successful. Some had things that kept hold on them in the drug world and hurt their success in legitimate ventures. Their exits from the drug world then tended to be temporary and easily broken; periods of relapse into dealing occurred. This tended to be a cycle every time an attempt to exit was made; however, each subsequent attempt brought them further back into society. Their reattachment to society had its own set of problems due to their long absence from the mainstream economy.

== Controversy ==
For many years, Adler taught a course on the Sociology of Deviance at University of Colorado at Boulder. In 2013, Adler claims she was forced into retirement and would not be allowed to teach the course again because of a lecture about prostitution. The lecture involved teaching assistants dressing up as prostitutes from different social positions and telling stories about their lives.

== Bibliography ==
- Paradise Laborers: Hotel Work in the Global Economy, 2004
- Sociological Odyssey: Contemporary Readings in Sociology, 2001, 2007
- Peer Power: Preadolescent Culture and Identity, 1998
- Constructions of Deviance: Social Power, Context, and Interaction, 1994, 1997, 2000, 2003, 2006, 2009, 2014
- Backboards and Blackboards, 1991
- Membership Roles in Field Research, 1987
- Wheeling and Dealing, 1985, 1993
- The Social Dynamics of Financial Markets, 1984
