= Behemoth: The Structure and Practice of National Socialism =

Literary work

Behemoth: The Structure and Practice of National Socialism 1933–1944 is a book by the German lawyer and political scientist Franz Leopold Neumann. It was written from 1941 to 1944 during his exile in the United States and appeared for the first time in 1942, then in an expanded edition in 1944.

== Contents ==
The title is a reference to Thomas Hobbes' book Behemoth from 1668, and the biblical monster of the same name.

Although Nazi Germany appeared as a totalitarian and strong state, Neumann did not compare it with the monster Leviathan, also used by Hobbes. Instead, he equated it with Behemoth, which to Hobbes had represented a state of lawlessness in society, the state of nature. In a complex analysis, Neumann tried to show that behind the authoritarian and autocratic façade of the Nazi regime, there was ultimately nothing but unbridled terror, egotism and arbitrariness on the part of certain social groups. An example of this was the aryanization (confiscation) of Jewish property, which had mostly served the interests of large capitalist companies such as Mannesmann or Thyssen.

== Reception ==
Despite a sometimes mixed reception when first published (e.g. ″the author is not always convincing″, "the facts [Neumann] gives not only present the most detailed analysis of National Socialism, but are undistorted, true, complete and reliable. But his interpretation of these facts is open to the most serious doubt and criticism."), the book was generally well received (e.g. ″one of the most important books on Nazi Germany that has appeared in recent years″, "This is not just another book about Nazi Germany. It is the most significant attempt yet made at scholarly and painstaking analysis, based almost exclusively upon German sources, of the background, working principles and practices, and present state of National-Socialist Germany."). The book is now often seen as ″a standard work on the subject of National Socialism'″.

== See also ==
- The Dual State
