= Georg Rusche =

German political economist and criminologist

Georg Rusche (17 November 1900 – 19 October 1950) was a German political economist and criminologist, born in Hanover. He was the co-author with Otto Kirchheimer of Punishment and Social Structure (1939).

He committed suicide in Uxbridge, London, in 1950.

== Works ==
- 'Labor Market and Penal Sanction', 1933
- (with Otto Kirchheimer) Punishment and Social Structure, 1939.
