= Dual state (model) =

Political model of the state

The dual state is a model in which the functioning of a state is divided into a normative state, which operates according to set rules and regulations, and a prerogative state, "which exercises unlimited arbitrariness and violence unchecked by any legal guarantees". The term was coined by Ernst Fraenkel to describe the functioning of the Nazi state, and especially law in Nazi Germany, which he described in his 1941 book The Dual State: A Contribution to the Theory of Dictatorship.

Although it was originally intended as an analysis of authoritarian states, some elements of the prerogative state are present in democracies. The model has also been applied to other states, including Israel, the United States, South Africa, Fascist Italy, 21st-century China, Russia, Lebanon, and post-2015 Turkey.

== United States ==
In 2025, amid changes in the way the U.S. government operated during the first year of Donald Trump's second term, some began to argue that the United States was beginning to resemble a dual state. The idea received increased attention after Supreme Court Justice Ketanji Brown Jackson cited The Dual State in a dissenting opinion on the Trump v. CASA case.

== See also ==
- Deep state
- Democratic backsliding
- Dual federalism
- Dual power
- Dual Presidency Theory
- Dualism (politics)
- Fascism
- Hybrid regime
- Illiberal democracy
- Lawfare
- Parallel state
- Political violence
- Secret police
- State of exception
- State violence
