= Ernst Fraenkel (political scientist) =

German-Jewish lawyer (1898–1975)

- Born: December 26, 1898; Cologne, Germany
- Died: March 28, 1975 (aged 76); Berlin, Germany
- Citizenship: Germany, USA

Academic background
- Thesis: The void labour contract

Academic work
- Discipline: political science law
- Institutions: New School for Social Research; Deutsche Hochschule für Politik; Freie Universität Berlin
- Notable works: The Dual State

Ernst Fraenkel (December 26, 1898 – March 28, 1975) was a German-Jewish lawyer and political scientist. Prior to World War II, Fraenkel served as a criminal defense lawyer for Jews who were targeted by the Nazi regime. During the war, he authored the book The Dual State on the political structure of the Nazi regime and subsequently became one of the founding fathers of German political science.

During the Weimar Republic, Fraenkel was a member of the social democrats and one of the few jurists who held socialist opinions. According to some historians in the 1930s he was designated to be Attorney General of a possible social-democratic German government. In 1939 he immigrated to the United States where he began to develop his respect for the politics of that country, especially its pluralism and its checks and balances.

== Life ==
Fraenkel was born in a Jewish family in Cologne. He served during the First World War from 1916 to 1918 in the German Army. He wrote his dissertation in law about The void labor contract (Der nichtige Arbeitsvertrag), under Hugo Sinzheimer.

During the Weimar Republic, he worked in labor law with Franz Leopold Neumann, published scientific publications and was engaged in socialist politics. Although the Nazis banned Jewish lawyers from appearing in court after they came to power in 1933, Fraenkel was still allowed to work to a limited extent due to having been a soldier in World War I. He was connected to several resistance groups such as the Internationaler Sozialistischer Kampfbund (International Socialist Fighting Alliance) . In 1938 he finally left Germany for the United Kingdom, then immigrating in 1939 to the United States, where he became a citizen in August 1944.

Shortly after arriving in New York City, Fraenkel moved to Chicago, where he studied American law at the University of Chicago Law School, graduating in 1941. During this period he revised and completed a manuscript that he had brought with him from Germany. In this work, published in 1941 as The Dual State, he analyzes the political system of the Nazi state. For Fraenkel there coexisted in the Nazi government a "normative state" (Normenstaat), which secured the continuation of capitalist society for those Germans not threatened by Nazism, and a "prerogative state" (Maßnahmenstaat), which used both legal and extralegal violence against people considered to be enemies of Nazism and Nazi Germany.

Fraenkel lectured at the New School for Social Research.

In 1944 he published a book on the occupational government in the Rhineland 1918–1923 for the future occupation powers to avoid repeating the mistakes made 20 years earlier.

From 1945 on Fraenkel was an adviser to the American government but was soon dissatisfied with its policy of occupation in Korea. For the United Nations he was supposed to be one of the people to prepare free elections in Korea, but the Korean War made the elections impossible and forced Fraenkel to leave the country.

In 1951 Fraenkel returned to Germany. He became a lecturer at the Deutsche Hochschule für Politik in Berlin and later a professor at the Freie Universität Berlin, where he founded the John F. Kennedy-Institute for North American Studies. He considered his writings to be normative; his concept of pluralism was meant to criticize the existing political system. Those among his students who were active in the 1968 movement, however, saw his American-influenced theories as defending monopolistic capitalism.

He was a U.S. citizen until 1972. He died in Berlin on March 28, 1975.

== Works ==
- 1927 – Zur Soziologie der Klassenjustiz (Sociology of Class Justice)
- 1931–1933 – "Chronik" des republikanischen Richterbundes (Chronicles of the Republikanischer Richterbund)
- 1941 – The Dual State
- 1957 – Staat und Politik
- 1960 – Das amerikanische Regierungssystem (The American System of Government)
- 1964 – Deutschland und die westlichen Demokratien (Germany and the Western Democracies)

== See also ==
- Dual State (model)
- Dolf Sternberger
